= James Beard Foundation Award: 2000s =

Annual culinary awards in the US

The James Beard Foundation Awards are annual awards presented by the James Beard Foundation to recognize culinary professionals in the United States. The awards recognize chefs, restaurateurs, authors and journalists each year, and are generally scheduled around James Beard's May birthday.

The foundation also awards annually since 1998 the designation of America's Classic for local independently-owned restaurants that reflect the character of the community.

== 2000 awards ==
The 2000 James Beard Awards were presented on May 8, 2000, at the New York Marriott Marquis.

=== Chef and Restaurant Awards ===
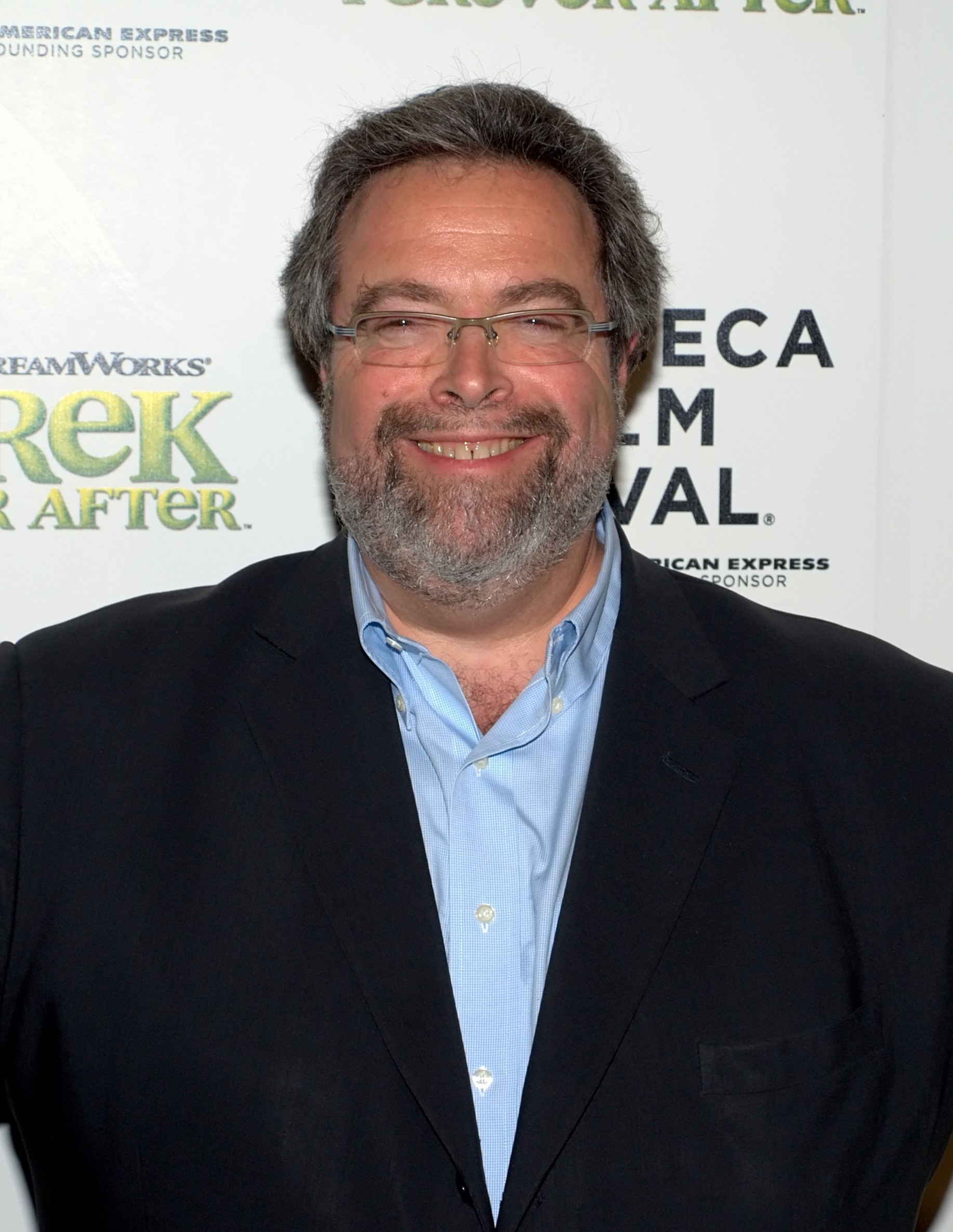
Drew Nieporent

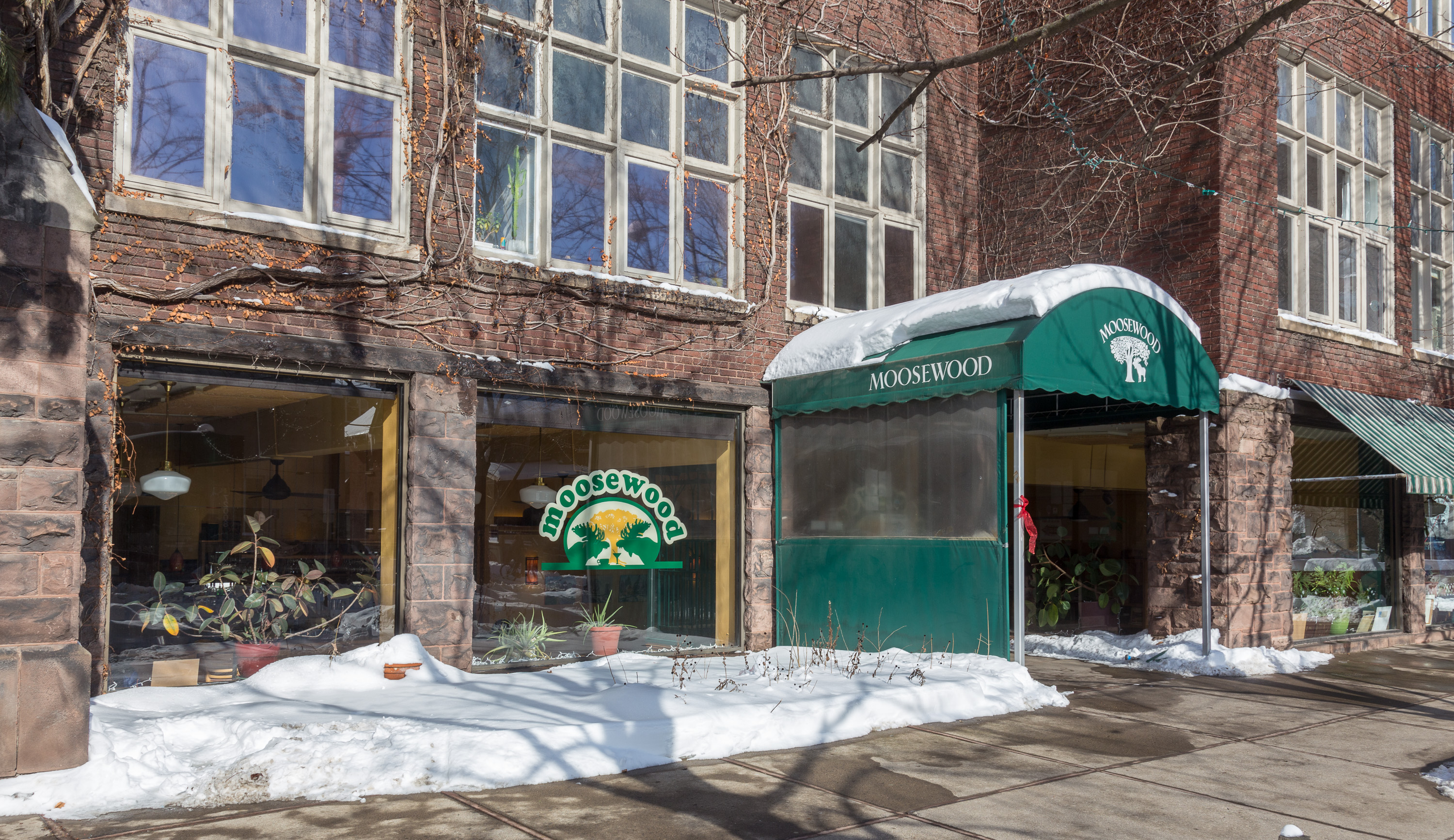
Moosewood Restaurant

- Outstanding Chef: David Bouley, Danube; New York, NY
- Lifetime Achievement Award: Marcella Hazan; Longboat Key, FL
- Humanitarian of the Year: Drew Nieporent; New York, NY
- Outstanding Restaurant: Charlie Trotter's; Chicago, IL
- America's Classics: Moosewood Restaurant; Ithaca, New York
- Rising Star Chef: Andrew Carmellini, Café Boulud; New York, NY
- Outstanding Pastry Chef: Claudia Fleming, Gramercy Tavern; New York, NY
- Outstanding Service: Chanterelle; New York, NY
- Outstanding Wine & Spirits Professional: Kermit Lynch, Kermit Lynch Wine Merchants; New York, NY
- Outstanding Wine Service: Rubicon; San Francisco, CA
- Best Chef: California: Judy Rodgers, Zuni Cafe; San Francisco, CA
- Best Chef: Mid-Atlantic: Craig Shelton, The Ryland Inn; Whitehouse, NJ
- Best Chef: Midwest: Arun Sampanthavivat, Arun; Chicago, IL
- Best Chef: New York City: Tom Colicchio, Gramercy Tavern; New York, NY
- Best Chef: Northeast: Michael Schlow, Radius; Boston, MA
- Best Chef: Northwest/Hawaii: Jerry Traunfeld, The Herbfarm; Issaquah, WA
- Best Chef: Southeast: Ben Barker, Magnolia Grill; Durham, NC
- Best Chef: Southwest: Janos Wilder, Janos; Tucson, AZ
- Best New Restaurant: Restaurant Gary Danko; San Francisco, CA
- Outstanding Restaurant Design: Diller & Scofidio, Brasserie; New York, NY
- Outstanding Restaurant Graphics: 2x4, Brasserie; New York, NY

=== Book Awards ===
- Cookbook Hall of Fame: Classic Italian Cookbook by Marcella Hazan
- Cookbook of the Year: A Mediterranean Feast by Clifford Wright
- Americana: American Home Cooking by Bill Jamison and Cheryl Alters Jamison
- Baking & Desserts: The Bread Bible by Beth Hensperger
- Best Food Photography: New Food Fast, photographer Petrina Tinslay
- Chefs and Restaurants: The Kitchen Sessions with Charlie Trotter by Charlie Trotter
- Entertaining & Special Occasions: Entertaining 1-2-3 by Rozanne Gold
- General: Julia and Jacques Cooking at Home by Julia Child and Jacques Pepin
- Healthy Focus: A Spoonful of Ginger by Nina Simonds
- International: Madhur Jaffrey's World Vegetarian by Madhur Jaffrey
- Reference: The Oxford Companion to Food by Alan Davidson
- Single Subject: The Cook's Illustrated Complete Book of Poultry by Editors of Cook's Illustrated Magazine
- Wine & Spirits: Terroir by James E. Wilson
- Writing on Food: A Mediterranean Feast by Clifford Wright

=== Broadcast Media Awards ===
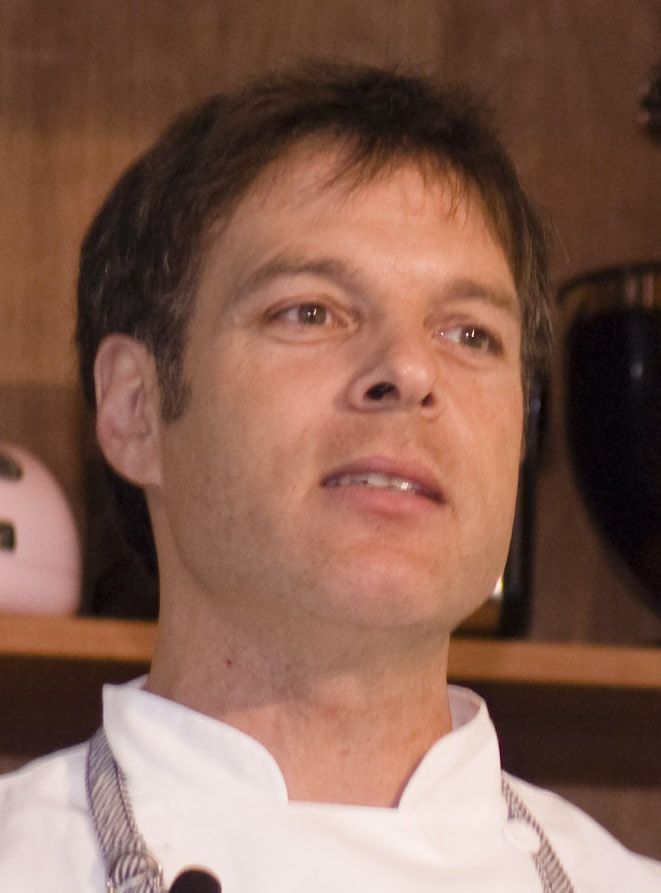
Joey Altman

- Best Local Television Cooking Show or Segment: Bay Cafe; host: Joey Altman, producers: Janette Gitler and Bertrand Pelligrin, Bay TV
- Best National Television Cooking Show or Segment: The Kitchen Sessions with Charlie Trotter; host; Charlie Trotter, producers: Melanie Kosaka and Robert Bates, APT
- Best National Television Food Journalism: American Eats: History on a Bun; host: Daniel Silverman, producers: Susan Werbe and Bruce David Klein, The History Channel
- Best Radio Show, Short Form, On Food: Weekend All Things Considered, host: Daniel Zwerdling, producer: Walter Ray Watson, NPR
- Best Radio Show, Long Form, On Food: 848, host: Steve Dolinsky, producers: Tish Valva and Justin Kaufman, WBEZ

=== Journalism Awards ===
- Internet Writing: Irene Sax, "Great Expectations", food.epicurious.com
- M.F.K. Fisher Distinguished Writing: Greg Atkinson, "Diary of a Stagiaire", Food Arts
- Magazine Feature Writing About Restaurants and/or Chefs: Mimi Sheraton, "Seasons in the Sun", Vanity Fair
- Magazine Feature with Recipes: James Villas, "P.C. and Proud of It", Gourmet
- Magazine Feature without Recipes: Lisa Armand, "My Dinners with Alan", Boston Magazine
- Magazine Restaurant Review or Critique: Alan Richman, GQ
- Magazine Series: Colman Andrews, "The Fishmonger's Table," "The World of Cipriani," & "Inside the Palazzo", Saveur
- Magazine Writing on Diet, Nutrition & Health: Perri Klass, "The Lunch Box as a Battlefield", Gourmet
- Magazine Writing on Spirits, Wine & Beer: Rod Smith, "Purple Gold Rush", Wine & Spirits
- Newspaper Feature Writing About Restaurants and/or Chefs: Kim Severson, "The Rise and Fall of a Star: How the King of California Cuisine Lost and Empire", San Francisco Chronicle
- Newspaper Feature Writing with Recipes: Cathy Barber, "The Real Parmigiano Reggiano", The Dallas Morning News
- Newspaper Feature Writing without Recipes: Robin Davis, "Sushi American Style", San Francisco Chronicle
- Newspaper Restaurant Review or Critique: Craig LeBan, The Philadelphia Inquirer
- Newspaper Series: Marlene Parrish, "Are You Game," "Fowl Play," & "Bison is at Home on Many an Adventuresome Restaurant Table", Pittsburgh Post-Gazette
- Newspaper Writing on Diet, Nutrition & Health: Michael Apstein, "To Your Health – Or Is It?", The Boston Globe
- Newspaper Writing on Spirits, Wine & Beer: Michael Skube, "Experiment with Hops, a Welcome Development", The Atlanta Journal-Constitution

== 2001 awards ==
The 2001 James Beard Awards were presented on April 30, 2001, at the New York Marriott Marquis.

=== Chef and Restaurant Awards ===
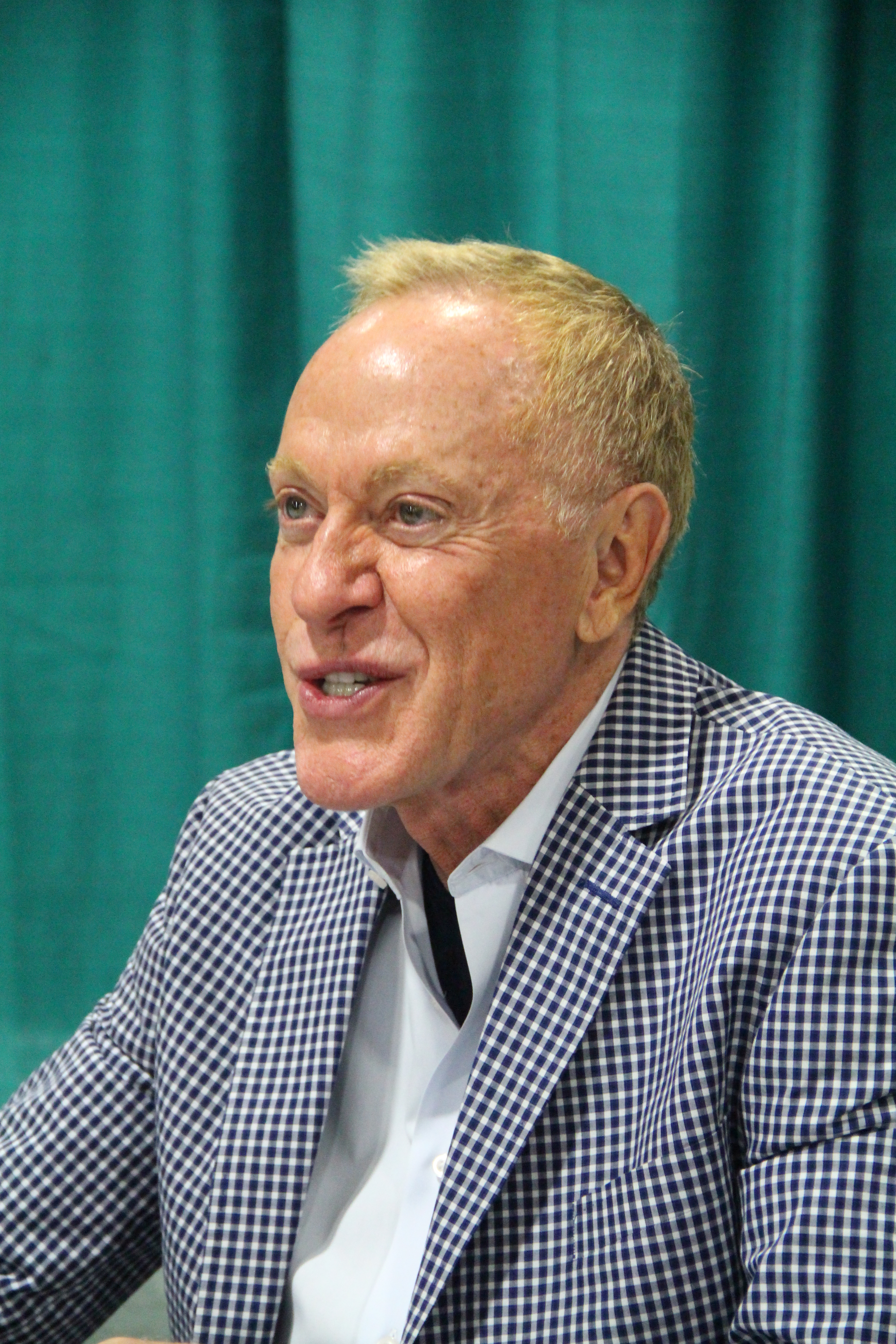
Patrick O'Connell

- Outstanding Chef : Patrick O'Connell, The Inn at Little Washington; Washington, VA
- Lifetime Achievement Award: Ernest Gallo; Modesto, CA
- Humanitarian of the Year: Richard Grausman; New York, NY
- Outstanding Restaurant: Campanile; Los Angeles, CA
- Best New Restaurant: Alain Ducasse at the Essex House; New York, NY
- Rising Star Chef: Galen Zamarra, Bouley Bakery; New York, NY
- Outstanding Pastry Chef: Gale Gand, Tru; Chicago, IL
- Outstanding Service: Gramercy Tavern; New York, NY
- Outstanding Wine & Spirits Professional: Gerald Asher, Gourmet Magazine; San Francisco, CA
- Outstanding Wine Service: The French Laundry; Yountville, CA
- Best Chef: California: Nancy Oakes, Boulevard; San Francisco, CA
- Best Chef: Mid-Atlantic: Jean-Marie Lacroix, Fountain Restaurant; Philadelphia, PA
- Best Chef: Midwest: Odessa Piper, L'Etoile; Madison, WI
- Best Chef: New York City: Michael Romano, Union Square Cafe; New York, NY
- Best Chef: Northeast: Ken Oringer, Clio; Boston, MA
- Best Chef: Northwest/Hawaii: Philippe Boulot, The Heathman Hotel; Portland, OR
- Best Chef: Southeast: Frank Stitt, Highlands Bar & Grill; Birmingham, AL
- Best Chef: Southwest: Robert McGrath, Roaring Fork; Scottsdale, AZ
- Outstanding Restaurant Design: Leroy Adventures, The Russian Tea Room; New York, NY
- Outstanding Restaurant Graphics: Louey/Rubino Design Group, Inc, NoMi Restaurant; Chicago, IL

=== Book Awards ===
- Cookbook Hall of Fame: A Book of Mediterranean Food by Elizabeth David
- Cookbook of the Year: Hot Sour Salty Sweet: A Culinary Journey Through Southeast Asia by Naomi Duguid and Jeffrey Alford
- Americana: Tom Douglas' Seattle Kitchen by Tom Douglas
- Baking & Desserts: Artisan Baking Across America: The Breads, The Bakers, The Best Recipes by Maggie Glezer
- Best Food Photography: Hot Sour Salty Sweet: A Culinary Journey Through Southeast Asia, photographers Naomi Duguid, Jeffrey Alford, and Richard Jung
- Entertaining & Special Occasions: Savor the Moment by Junior League of Boca Raton
- General: Think Like a Chef by Tom Colicchio
- Healthy Focus: Healthy Jewish Cooking by Steven Raichlen
- International: Mexico One Plate at a Time by Rick Bayless, Deann Bayless, and Jean Marie Brownson
- Single Subject: The Good Egg by Marie Simmons
- Vegetarian: The Modern Vegetarian Kitchen by Peter Berley and Melissa Clark
- Wine & Spirits: American Vintage: The Rise of American Wine by Paul Lukacs
- Writing and Reference: Pot of the Fire: Further Exploits of a Renegade Cook by John Thorne and Matt Lewis Thorne

=== Broadcast Media Awards ===
- Best Local Television Cooking Show: Bay Cafe; host: Joey Altman, producer: Tricia Johnson Reece, KRON-TV
- Best National Television Cooking Show: Julia and Jacques Cooking at Home; hosts; Julia Child and Jacques Pepin, producers: Geoffrey Drummond and Nat Katzman, PBS
- Best Television Food Journalism: The Road to Bocuse D'Or; producer: Nicolas Versteeg, Food Network
- Best Television Food Segment: Innovations: Just Desserts; host: Bernard Shaw, producer: Marika Olsen, Food Network
- Best Television Cooking Special: A Spoonful of Ginger; host: Nina Simonds, producer: Charles Pinsky, APT Public TV
- Best Radio Show, Short Form, On Food: Bon Appetit Magazine Lifestyle, host: Anthony Dias Blue, producer: Rick Reece, WCBS-AM and KFWB-AM
- Best Radio Show, Long Form, On Food: Food Family and Home, host/producer: Lauren Groveman, WVOX FM

=== Journalism Awards ===
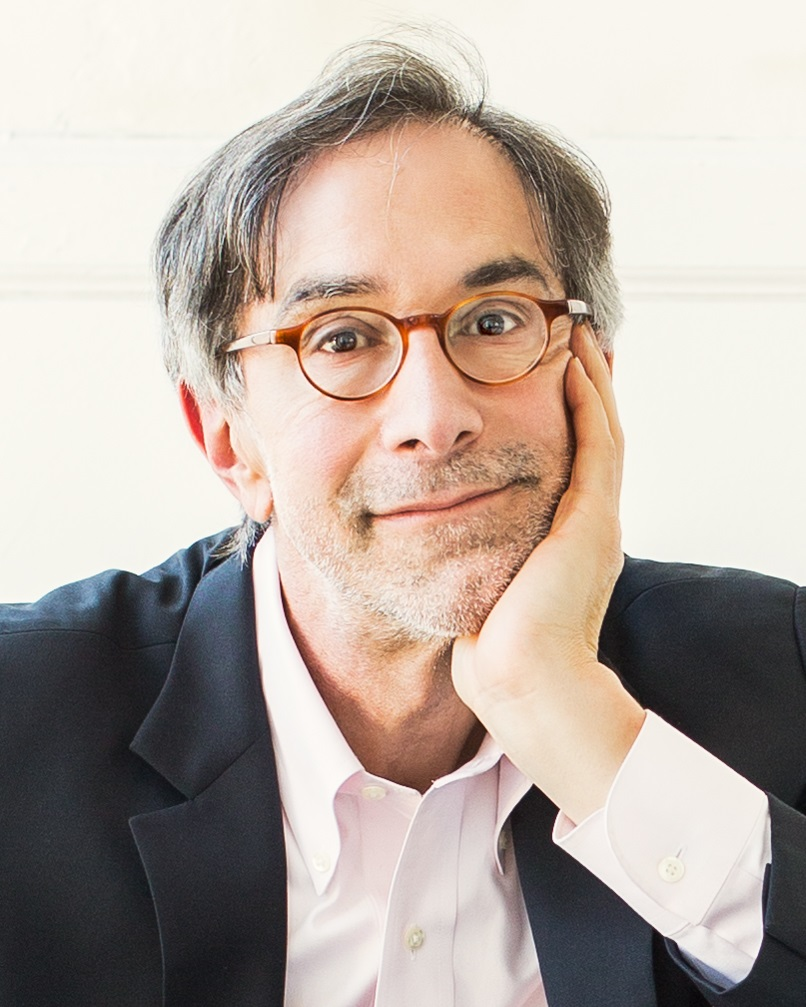
Corby Kummer

- Internet Writing: Corby Kummer, "Tuscany Reluctantly," "Bygone World of the Bialy," & "Confessions of a Cookie Eater", Atlantic Unbound
- M.F.K. Fisher Distinguished Writing: Shoba Narayan, "The God of Small Feasts", Gourmet
- Magazine Column: Corby Kummer, "Ice Cream For Beginners," "A Better Egg," & "Craftsman Cheese", The Atlantic Monthly
- Magazine Feature Writing About Restaurants and/or Chefs: Bruce Feiler, "Pocketful of Dough", Gourmet
- Magazine Feature with Recipes: Pat Conroy, "An Oyster Roast ... Like Tasting Heaven", Gourmet
- Magazine Feature without Recipes: Adrian Bailey, "The Indomitable Miss D.H.", Gourmet
- Magazine Restaurant Review or Critique: Jonathan Gold, Gourmet
- Magazine or Newspaper Series: Laurie Ochoa, David Karp, and Warren Schultz, "The Next Family Farm," "Matchmaker, Matchmaker," & "Cold Comfort Farm", Gourmet
- Magazine or Newspaper Writing on Consumer Nutrition Issues: Judith Weinraub, "Endangered Species? Why the Cheese You Enjoy Today Could Be Gone Tomorrow", The Washington Post
- Magazine Writing on Spirits, Wine & Beer: David Lynch, "Total Tequila", Wine & Spirits Magazine
- Newspaper Feature Writing About Restaurants and/or Chefs: Kim Severson, "The Rise and Fall of a Star: How the King of California Cuisine Lost and Empire", San Francisco Chronicle
- Newspaper Column: Robert Wolke, Food 101: "Salt Talks," "Sea Salt Shakedown," & "Salt, the Final Episode", The Washington Post
- Newspaper Feature Writing About Restaurants and/or Chefs: Douglas Hanks III, "The Sherrill's Secret", The Washington Post
- Newspaper Feature Writing with Recipes: Vincent Schiavelli, "Sicilian Summers", Los Angeles Times
- Newspaper Feature Writing without Recipes: Jeannette Batz, "Fertile Imagination", Riverfront Times
- Newspaper Restaurant Review or Critique: Dara Moskowitz Grumdahl, City Pages, Minneapolis

== 2002 awards ==
The 2002 James Beard Awards were presented on May 6, 2002, at the New York Marriott Marquis.

=== Chef and Restaurant Awards ===
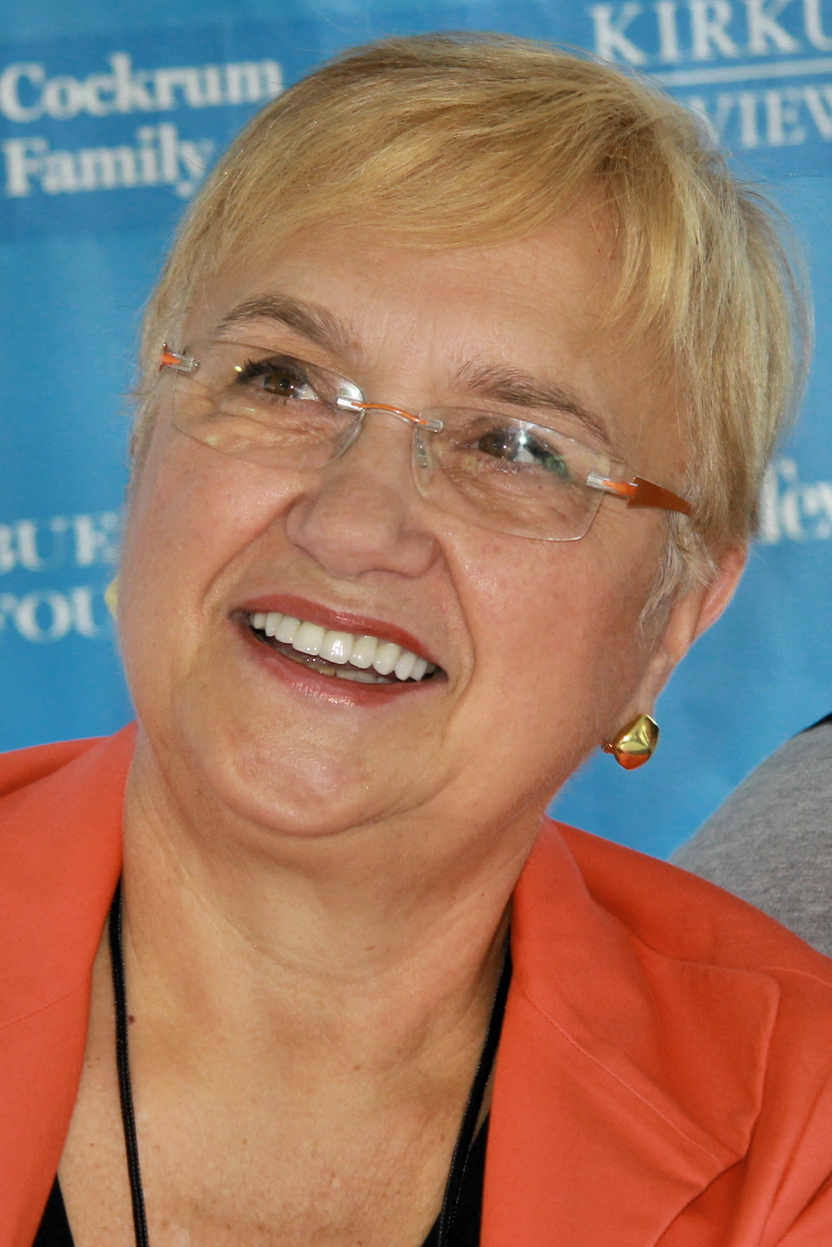
Lidia Bastianich

- Outstanding Chef: Lidia Bastianich, Felidia Ristorante; New York, NY
- Lifetime Achievement Award: George H. Lang, New York, NY
- Humanitarian of the Year: Restaurant Industry of New York
- Outstanding Restaurant: Gotham Bar & Grill; New York, NY
- Best New Restaurant: Craft; New York, NY
- Rising Star Chef: Jean-Francois Bruel, DB Bistro Moderne; New York, NY
- Outstanding Pastry Chef: Sherry Yard, Spago Beverly Hills; Beverly Hills, CA
- Outstanding Service: Charlie Trotter's; Chicago, IL
- Outstanding Wine & Spirits Professional: Andrea Immer Robinson; French Culinary Institute; New York, NY
- Outstanding Wine Service: Gramercy Tavern; New York, NY
- Best Chef: California: Michael Mina, Aqua; San Francisco, CA
- Best Chef: Mid-Atlantic: Guillermo Pernot, Pasion!; Philadelphia, PA
- Best Chef: Midwest: Rick Tramonto, Tru; Chicago, IL
- Best Chef: New York City: Mario Batali, Babbo; New York, NY
- Best Chef: Northeast: Ming Tsai, Blue Ginger; Wellesley, MA
- Best Chef: Northwest: Greg Higgins, Higgins; Portland, OR
- Best Chef: Southeast: Anne Kearney, Peristyle; New Orleans, LA
- Best Chef: Southwest: Julian Serrano, Picasso at the Bellagio Hotel; Las Vegas, NV
- Outstanding Restaurant Design: Thomas Schlesser & Demian Repucci, Blackbird Restaurant; Chicago, IL
- Outstanding Restaurant Graphics: Noreen Rei Fukumori, Dry Creek Kitchen; Healdsburg, CA

=== Book Awards ===
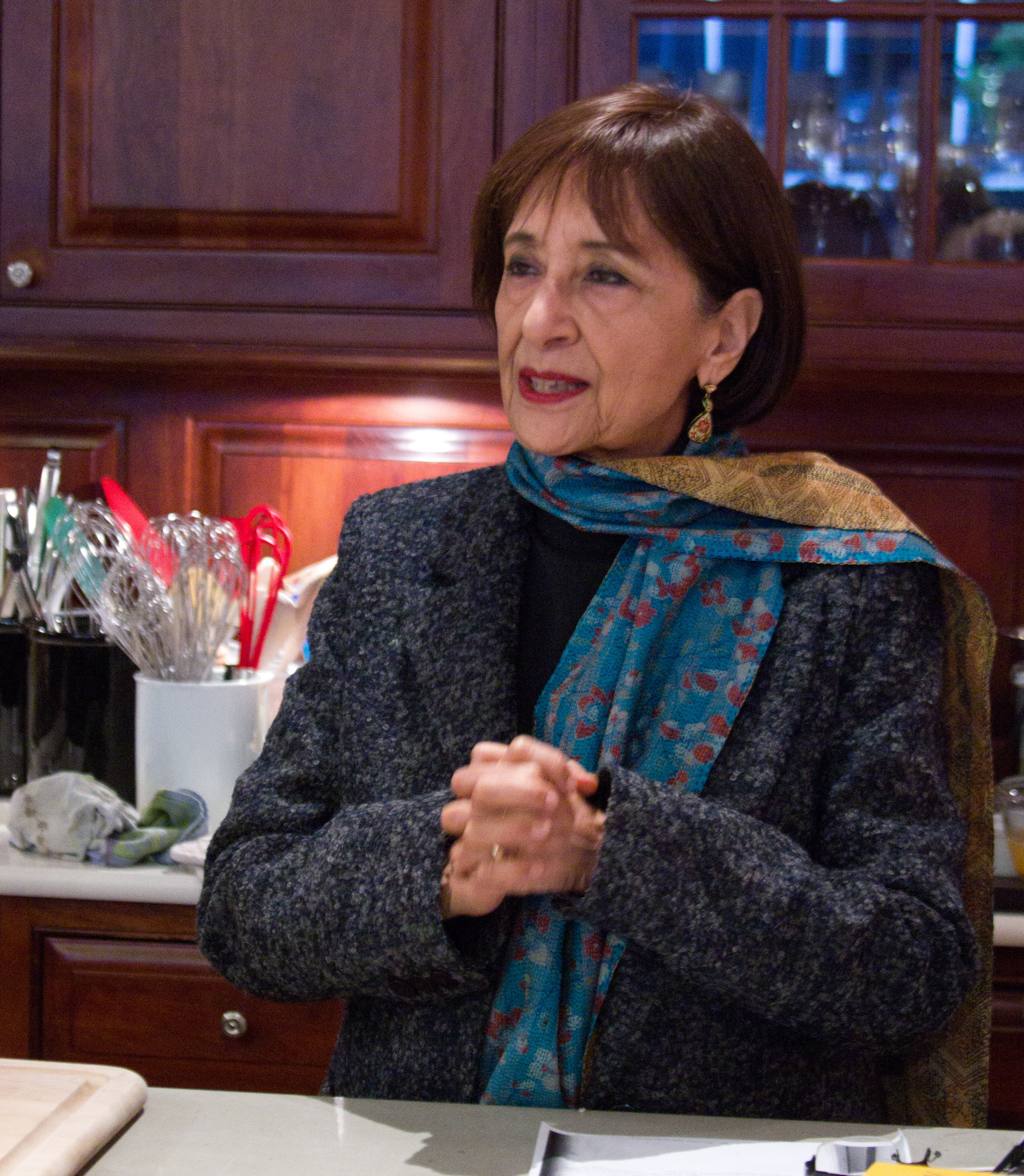
Madhur Jaffrey

- Cookbook Hall of Fame: North Atlantic Seafood by Alan Davidson
- Cookbook of the Year: The Bread Baker's Apprentice: Mastering the Art of Extraordinary Bread by Peter Reinhart
- Americana: Mustards Grill: Napa Valley Cookbook by Cindy Pawlcyn and Brigid Callinan
- Baking & Desserts: The Bread Baker's Apprentice: Mastering the Art of Extraordinary Bread by Peter Reinhart
- Best Food Photography: Charlie Trotter's Meat & Game, photographers Tim Turner and Michael Voltattorni
- Entertaining & Special Occasions: Jacques Pepin Celebrates by Jacques Pepin
- General: Back to the Table by Art Smith
- Healthy Focus: A New Way to Cook by Sally Schneider
- International: Madhur Jaffrey's Step-by-Step Cooking by Madhur Jaffrey
- Italian: Sicilian Home Cooking by Wanda Tornabene, Giovanna Tornabene, and Michele Evans
- Reference: Larousse Gastronomique by Librarie Larousse
- Single Subject: Ceviche! Seafoods, Salads, and Cocktails with a Latino Twist by Guillermo Pernot and Aliza Green
- Wine & Spirits: Wine by Andre Domine.
- Writing on Food: The Last Days of Haute Cuisine by Patric Kuh

=== Broadcast Media Awards ===
Russ Mitchell

- Best Local Television Cooking Show: Good Eating; host: Steve Dolinsky, producer: Stephanie Kurtz, CLTV
- Best National Television Cooking Show or Special: Saturday Night, A Day in the Life of Chef Michael Smith; host: Michael Smith, producers: Gretha Rose and Johanna Eliot, Food Network Canada
- Best National Television Food Journalism Show or Special: My Country, My Kitchen; host: Various, producer: Irene Wong, Food Network
- Best National or Local Television Food Segment: CBS News: The Saturday Early Show: Chef on a Shoestring; hosts: Thalia Assuras and Russ Mitchell, producer: Jee Won Park, CBS
- Best Radio Show on Food (Short Format): P.R.I.'s "The World", host: Steve Dolinsky, producer: Suzanne Marmion, Public Radio International
- Best Radio Show on Food (Long Format): The Food & Wine Radio Network Show; host: Jennifer Sawyer English, producer: Judy McDermott, The Food & Wine Radio Network
- Special Award of Excellence in Broadcasting: CBS News Sunday Morning; host: Charles Osgood, correspondent: Martha Teichner, producers: James Houtrides and Ed Forgotson, CBS

=== Journalism Awards ===
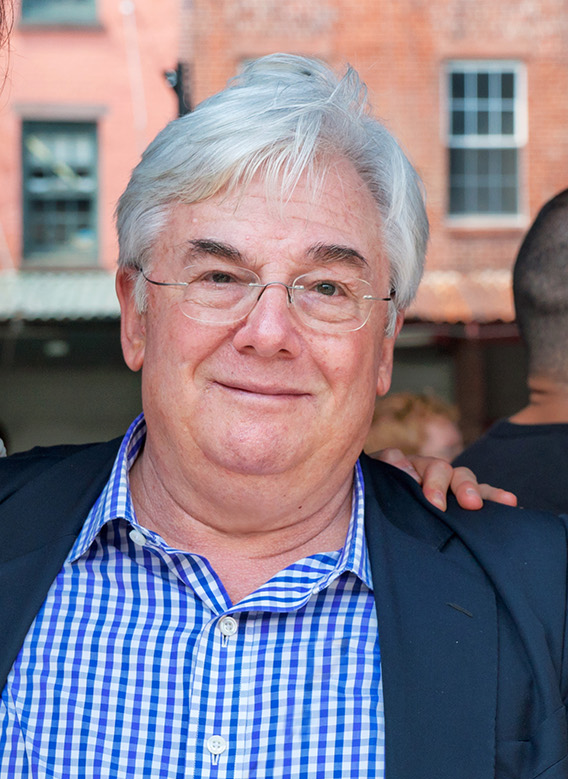
Jeffrey Steingarten

- Internet Column and Feature Writing: Steven A. Shaw, "A Week in the Gramercy Tavern Kitchen", www.fat-guy.com
- M.F.K. Fisher Distinguished Writing Award: Alan Richman, "A Mother's Knishes", GQ
- Magazine Column: Jeffrey Steingarten, "Salt Chic," "High Steaks," & "Something to Crow About", Vogue
- Magazine Feature about Restaurants and/or Chefs: Jocelyn Zuckerman, "Straight from the Heart", Gourmet
- Magazine Feature with Recipes: Bruce Feiler, "A Kiss to Build a Dream On", Gourmet
- Magazine Feature without Recipes: Maile Carpenter, "Eating in Michael Bauer's Town", San Francisco Magazine
- Magazine or Newspaper Writing on Nutrition or Consumer Food Issues: Marian Uhlman, "It's Making Us Fat", The Philadelphia Inquirer
- Magazine Restaurant Review or Critique: Alan Richman, "Toro! Toro! Toro!," "Pardon us Bubba...," & "Reflections on a Blood Sausage", GQ
- Magazine Series: Kathleen Brennan, Megan Wetherhall, and Margo True, Celebrating Everyday Herbs: "Memory," "Elegance" and "Power", Saveur
- Magazine Writing on Spirits, Wine & Beer: Pete Wells, "Single-Minded", Food & Wine
- Newspaper Column: Tara Duggan, "The Silver Torpedo: The Weighty, One-of-a-Kind Mission Burrito Has Reached Cult Status Among Its Wide Variety of Fans," "What's Cookin': A Store That Gives New Life to Old Kitchenware," & "Taco Truckin': Journey to the Mission for a Taste of Authentic Mexico from a Roving Restaurant", San Francisco Chronicle
- Newspaper Feature Writing About Restaurants and/or Chefs: Carolyn Jung, "Visionary Berkeley Chef Led Revolution in Dining, Alice Waters has put California on the World's Culinary Map", San Jose Mercury News
- Newspaper Feature Writing with Recipes: John Kessler, "Upper Crust Cooking: The Art of Using a Gratin Dish", The Atlanta Journal-Constitution
- Newspaper Feature Writing without Recipes: Janet Fletcher, "Sweet Success: From Richmond to Napa, from Safeway to High Society, Sam Godfrey Became the Bay Area's Baker to the Swells", San Francisco Chronicle
- Newspaper Restaurant Review or Critique: Pascale Le Draoulec, New York Daily News
- Newspaper Series: Kristin Eddy, "A Taste for Adventure," "Following the Scent," "The Search for Cinnamon", Chicago Tribune
- Newspaper Writing on Spirits, Wine & Beer: Alice Feiring, "For Better or Worse, Winemakers Go High Tech", The New York Times

== 2003 awards ==
The 2003 James Beard Awards were presented at the New York Marriott Marquis on May 5, 2003, which would have been James Beard's 100th birthday.

=== Chef and Restaurant Awards ===
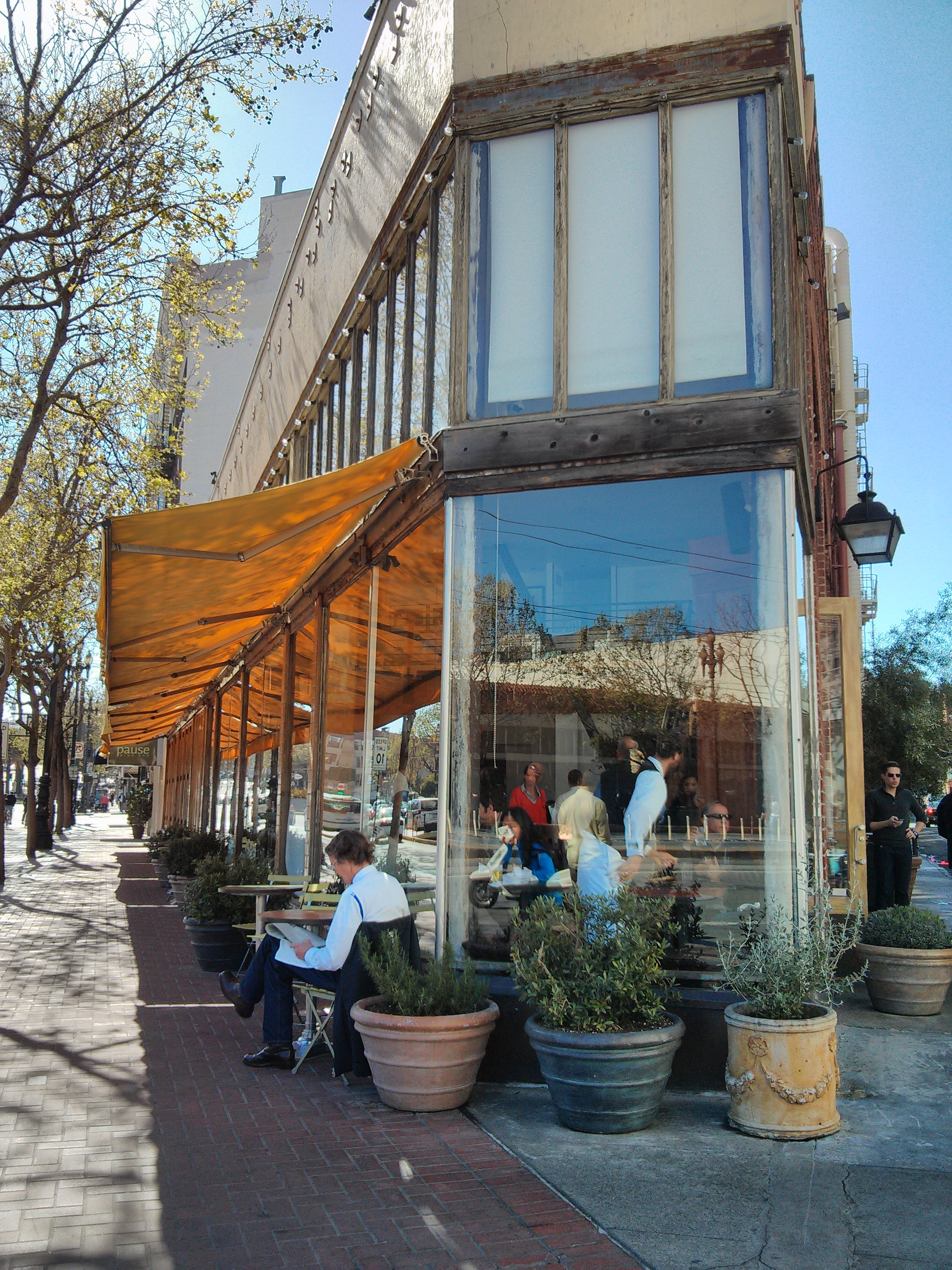
Zuni Cafe

- Outstanding Chef: Eric Ripert, Le Bernardin; New York, NY
- Lifetime Achievement Award: Marion Cunningham; Walnut Creek, CA
- Humanitarian of the Year: Julia Erickson; New York, NY
- Outstanding Restaurant: Zuni Cafe; San Francisco, CA
- Best New Restaurant: L'Impero; New York, NY
- Rising Star Chef: Grant Achatz, Trio; Evanston, IL
- Outstanding Pastry Chef: Karen Barker, Magnolia Grill; Durham, NC
- Outstanding Service: The French Laundry; Yountville, CA
- Outstanding Wine & Spirits Professional: Fritz Maytag; Anchor Brewing Company; San Francisco, CA
- Outstanding Wine Service: Daniel; New York, NY
- Best Chef: California: Hiro Sone, Terra; St. Helena, CA
- Best Chef: Mid-Atlantic: José Andrés, Jaleo; Washington, DC
- Best Chef: Midwest: Takashi Yagihashi, Tribute; Farmington Hills, MI
- Best Chef: New York City: Marcus Samuelsson, Aquavit; New York, NY
- Best Chef: Northeast: Barbara Lynch, No. 9 Park; Boston, MA
- Best Chef: Pacific Northwest: George Mavrothalassitis, Chef Mavro Restaurant; Honolulu, HI
- Best Chef: Southeast: Anne Quatrano and Clifford Harrison, Bacchanalia; Atlanta, GA
- Best Chef: Southwest: Chris Bianco, Pizzeria Bianco; Phoenix, AZ
- Outstanding Restaurant Design: Vicente Wolf Associates, L'Impero Restaurant; New York, NY
- Outstanding Restaurant Graphics: Three Wide Marketing, 40 Sardines; Overland Park, KS

=== Book Awards ===
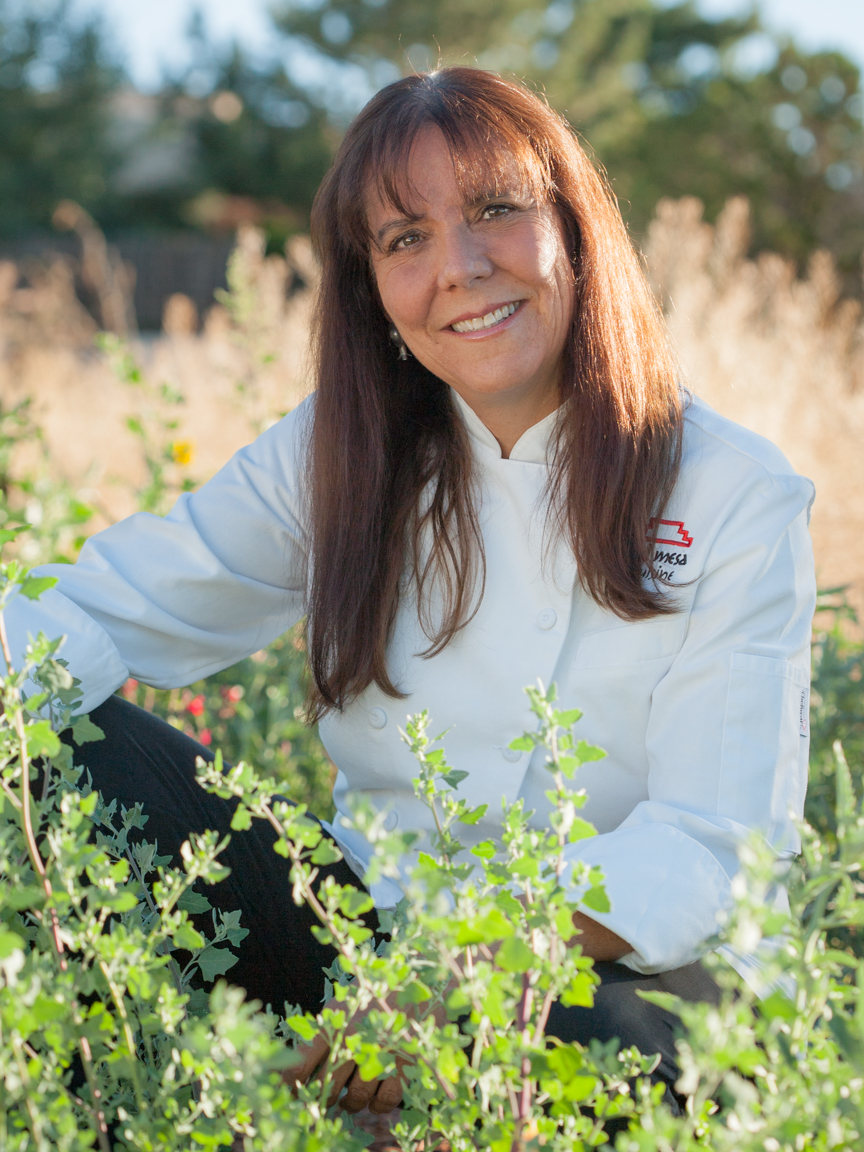
Lois Ellen Frank

- Cookbook Hall of Fame: The Edna Lewis Cookbook, In Pursuit of Flavor, The Taste of Country Cooking and Gift of Southern Cooking by Edna Lewis
- Cookbook of the Year: Zuni Cafe Cookbook by Judy Rodgers
- Americana: Foods of the Southwest Indian Nations by Lois Ellen Frank
- Baking: Baking in America by Greg Patent
- Best Food Photography: Belinda Jeffery's Tried and True Recipes, photographer Rodney Weiland
- Cooking from a Professional Point of View: Zuni Cafe Cookbook by Judy Rodgers
- General/Cooking for Everyday: Local Flavors by Deborah Madison
- International: Thai Food by David Thompson
- Literary Writing About Food, Wine & Spirits: Food Politics: How the Food Industry Influences Nutrition & Health by Marion Nestle
- Mediterranean: Glorious French Food by James Peterson
- Reference: I'm Just Here For the Food by Alton Brown
- Single Subject: The Flavors of Olive Oil by Deborah Krasner
- Tool & Techniques: Process This! by Jean Anderson
- Vegetarian/Healthy Focus: Passionate Vegetarian by Crescent Dragonwagon
- Wine & Spirits: Michael Broadbent's Vintage Wine by Michael Broadbent.

=== Broadcast Media Awards ===
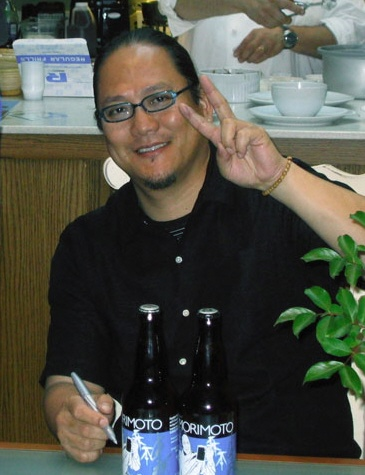
Masaharu Morimoto

- Best Local Television Cooking Show: Great Wine Made Simple: Andrea Immer in Chile; host: Andrea Immer Robinson, producers: Charles Pinsky and Margaret Sullivan, Maryland Public TV
- Best National Television Cooking Show: World Pastry Cup; host/producer: Nick Versteeg, Food Network
- Best National or Local Television Food Segment: Martha Stewart Living TV; hosts: Martha Stewart, producers: Mark Ski and Greta Anthony, WCBS-NY
- Best Television Special: Morimoto: RAW (Restaurateur, Artist, Warrior); hosts: Masaharu Morimoto, producer: Rachel Low, Food Network
- Best Radio Show on Food (Short Format): P.R.I.'s "The World", host: Steve Dolinsky, producer: David Leveille, Public Radio International
- Best Radio Show on Food (Long Format): All Things Considered - McDonald's: Fast Food and Animal Rights; host: Jennifer Sawyer English, host/producer: Daniel Zwerdling, NPR

=== Journalism Awards ===
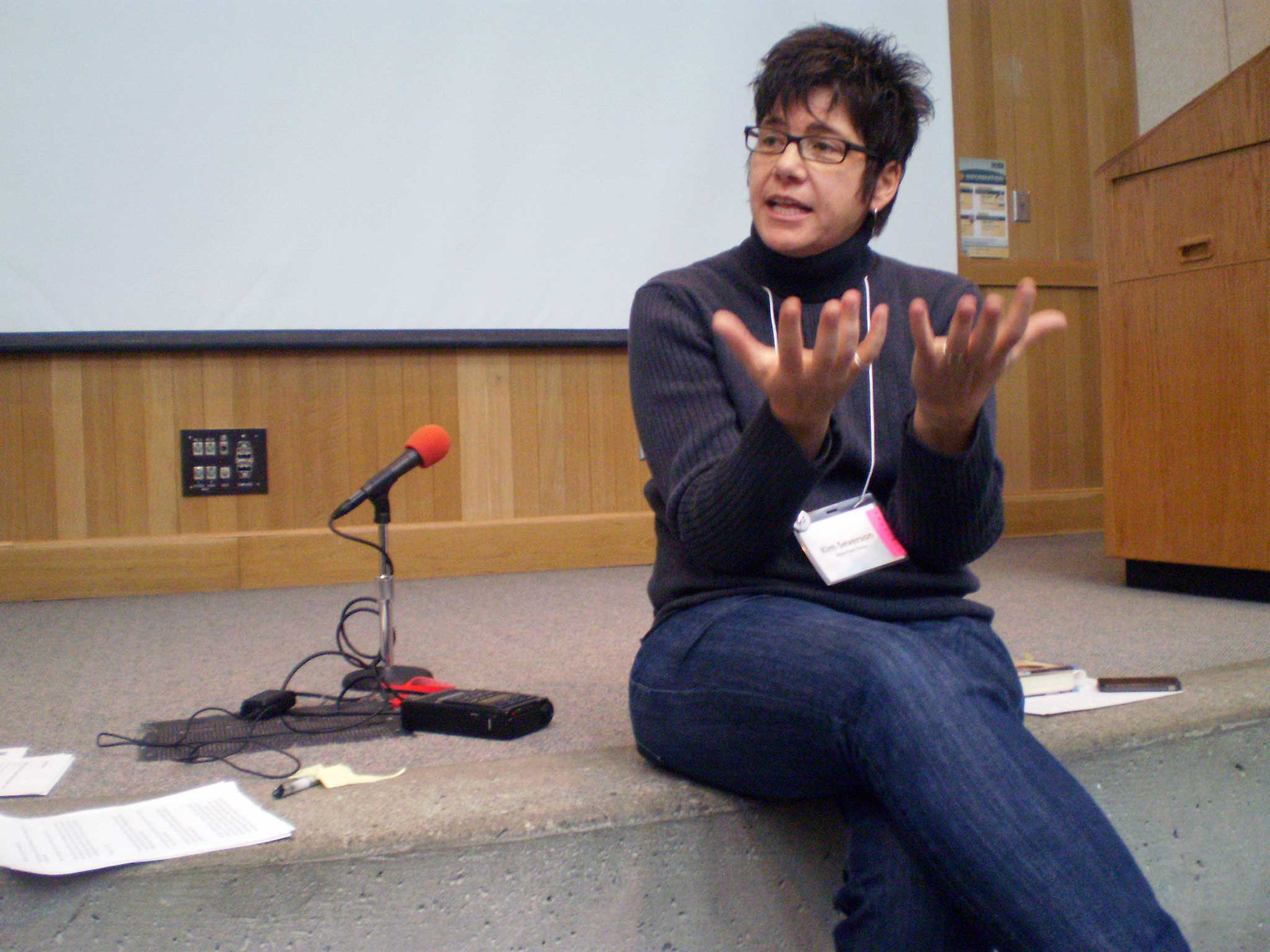
Kim Severson

- Internet Writing on Food, Nutrition, Travel, Restaurant, and Beverage: Natalie Maclean, "Lady Sings the Booze", www.nataliemaclean.com
- M.F.K. Fisher Distinguished Writing Award: Lettie Teague, "Secret Life of a Sommelier", Food & Wine
- Magazine Feature about Restaurants and/or Chefs: Bruce Feiler, "The Therapist at the Table", Gourmet
- Magazine Feature with Recipes: Kelly Alexander, "Hometown Appetites", Saveur
- Magazine Feature without Recipes: Bill Buford, "The Secret of Excess", The New Yorker
- Magazine Restaurant Review or Critique: Tanya Wenman Steel, "New York Rising", Bon Appetit
- Magazine Series: Dan Hofstadter, Michael Pollan, and Phyllis Richman, "Down on the Farm", Gourmet
- Magazine Writing on Spirits, Wine & Beer: Lyn Farmer, "House Style: Fashioning Champagnes That Resonate With the Makers' Mark", The Wine News
- Newsletter Writing on Food, Beverage, Restaurant, and Nutrition: David Rosengarthen, The Rosengarten Report
- Newspaper Feature Writing About Restaurants and/or Chefs: Sheila Himmel, "Serve You Right: Caring for Diners Is a Learnable Art", San Jose Mercury News
- Newspaper Feature Writing with Recipes: Candy Sagon, "9x13: In Praise of the Perfect Pan", The Washington Post
- Newspaper Feature Writing without Recipes: Kim Severson, "High Stakes: Bay Area at the Forefront of the Big-Bucks Battle Between Backers of Grass-Fed Beef and Traditional Cattlemen", San Francisco Chronicle
- Newspaper Food Section with Circulation 300,000 and Above: Lee S. Dean, Star Tribune (Minneapolis)
- Newspaper Food Section with Circulation Under 300,000: Judy Evans, St. Louis Post-Dispatch
- Newspaper Restaurant Review or Critique: Jason Sheehan, "Man with a Plan," "Deli Dally," "Life on the Line", Westword, Denver, Colorado
- Newspaper Series: Kim Severson and Lynne Bennett, Turkey Training Camp: "The Most American of Meals Draws Rookies: The Bay Area's Worst Cooks Vie for a Chance to Learn with a Pro," "The Challenge Begins: Out Winner Learns to Plan, Shop and Prep", "Countdown to Thanksgiving: Our Training Camp Recruit Tackles the Turkey", San Francisco Chronicle
- Newspaper Writing on Spirits, Wine & Beer: Rod Smith, "Winegrowing Season: Waiting for the Valley to Inhale", Los Angeles Times
- Newspaper, Magazine or Internet Reporting on Consumer Issues, Nutrition, and/or Health: Mark Stuertz, "Green Giant", Dallas Observer

== 2004 awards ==
The 2004 James Beard Awards were presented at the New York Marriott Marquis on May 10, 2004.

=== Chef and Restaurant Awards ===
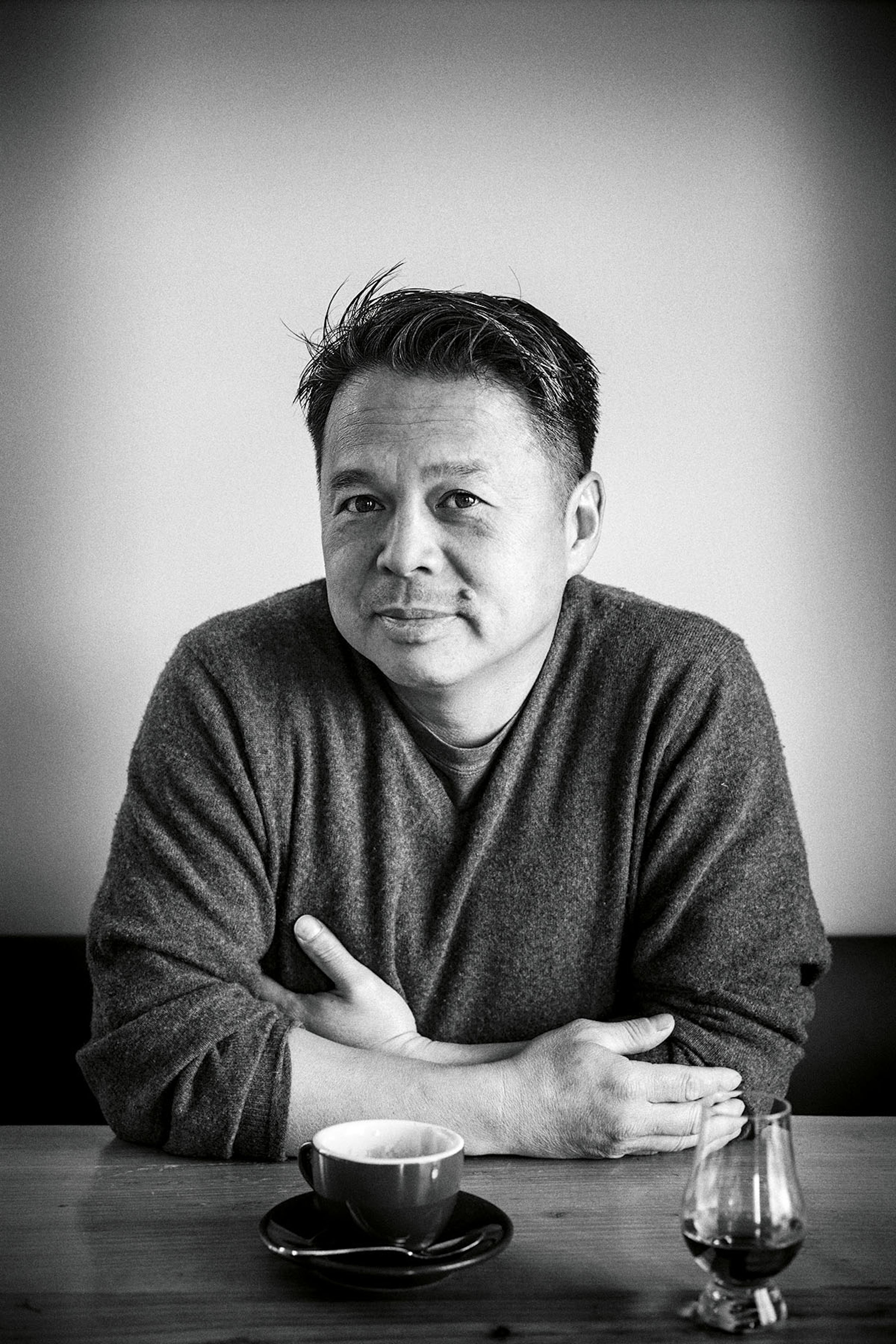
Charles Phan

- Outstanding Chef: Judy Rodgers, Zuni Café; San Francisco, CA
- Lifetime Achievement Award: Alice Waters, Chez Panisse; Berkeley, CA
- Humanitarian of the Year: Robert Egger, DC Central Kitchen; Washington, DC
- Outstanding Restaurant: Chanterelle; New York, NY
- Best New Restaurant: Bradley Ogden; Las Vegas, NV
- Rising Star Chef: Allison Vines-Rushing, Jack's Luxury Oyster Bar; New York, NY
- Outstanding Pastry Chef: Emily Luchetti, Farallon; San Francisco, CA
- Outstanding Service: Eleven Madison Park; New York, NY
- Outstanding Wine & Spirits Professional: Karen MacNeil, Culinary Institute of America at Greystone; St. Helena, CA
- Outstanding Wine Service: Babbo; New York, NY
- Best Chef: California: Charles Phan, The Slanted Door; San Francisco, CA
- Best Chef: Mid-Atlantic: Ann Cashion, Cashion's Eat Place; Washington, DC
- Best Chef: Midwest: Paul Kahan, Blackbird; Chicago, IL
- Best Chef: New York City: David Pasternack, Esca; New York, NY
- Best Chef: Northeast: Sam Hayward, Fore Street; Portland, ME.
- Best Chef: Pacific Northwest: Eric Tanaka, Dahlia Lounge; Seattle, WA
- Best Chef: Southeast: Louis Osteen, Louis' at Pawley's Island; Pawley's Island, SC
- Best Chef: Southwest: Luciano Pellegrini, Valentino at The Venetian; Las Vegas, NV
- Outstanding Restaurant Design and Outstanding Restaurant Graphics: AvroKO, Public; New York, NY

=== Book Awards ===
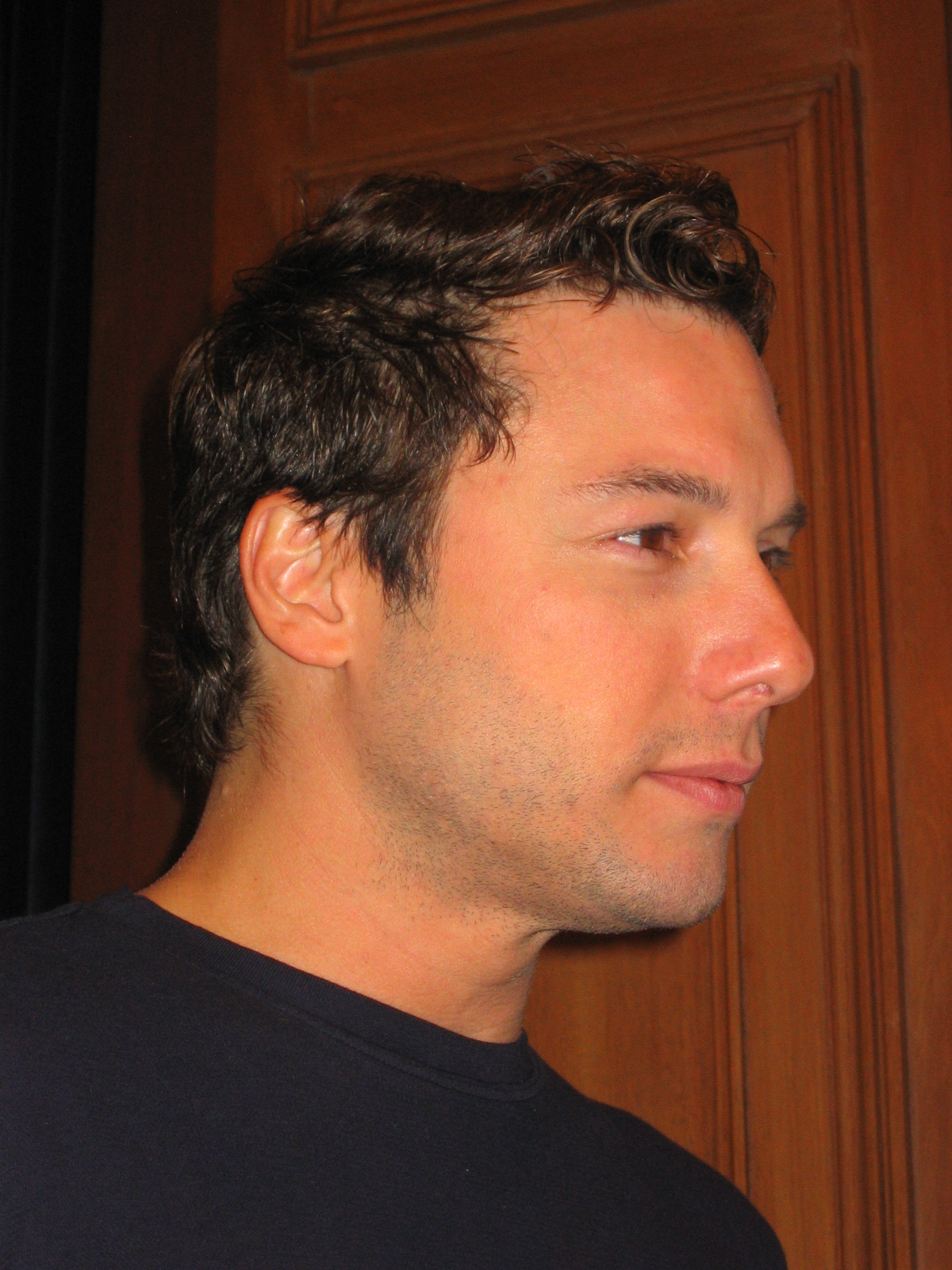
Rocco DiSpirito

- Baking: The Secrets of Baking: Simples Techniques for Sophisticated Desserts by Sherry Yard
- Cooking from a Professional Point of View: Flavor by Rocco DiSpirito
- Cooking of the Americas: It's All American Food by David Rosengarten
- General: The Quick Recipe by the editors of Cook's Illustrated Magazine
- Vegetarian/Healthy Focus: Taste Pure and Simple by Michel Nischan with Mary Goodbody
- International: From Curries to Kebabs by Madhur Jaffrey
- KitchenAid Cookbook Hall of Fame: The Modern Art of Chinese Cooking: Techniques & Recipes by Barbara Tropp
- KitchenAid Cookbook of the Year: The King Arthur Flour Baker's Companion by PJ Hamel
- Photography: Shunju: New Japanese Cuisine by Michele Tabozzi
- Single Subject: The All American Cheese and Wine Book by Laura Werlin
- Tools & Techniques: BBQ USA by Steven Raichlen
- Wine and Spirits: Wines of South America by Monty Waldin
- Writing and Reference: A Thousand Years Over a Hot Stove by Laura Schenone

=== Broadcast Media Awards ===
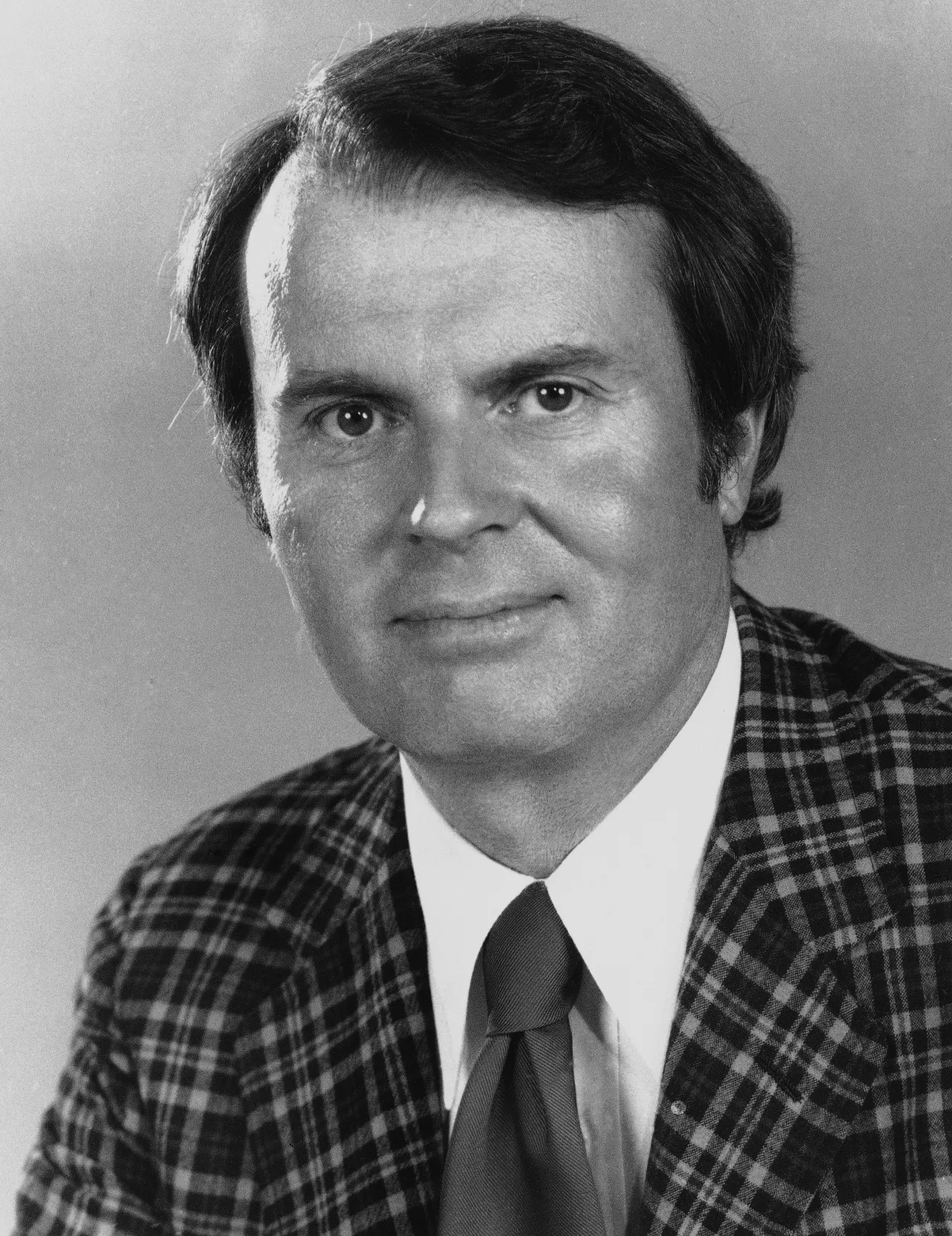
Charles Osgood

- Best Local Television Cooking Show: Good Eating; Steve Dolinsky, Nelson Howard, CLTV
- Best National Television Cooking Show: "Chefs A'Field: Culinary Adventures That Begin on the Farm," PBS.
- Best Television Food Journalism: "Eat, Drink and Be Merry," CBS News Sunday Morning, Charles Osgood
- Best Television Food Segment: "Head Table," CBS News Sunday Morning, Judith Hole, Heidi Hanson

=== Journalism Awards ===
Sources:

- M.F.K. Fisher Distinguished Writing Award: Natalie MacLean
- Magazine Feature about Restaurants and/or Chefs: Pete Wells, "A Chef At Peace", Food & Wine
- Magazine Feature with Recipes: Pete Wells, "Captain Bacon", Food & Wine
- Magazine Feature without Recipes: Julie Powell, "People and Places: Julia Knows Best", Bon Appétit
- Magazine Restaurant Review or Critique: Alan Richman, GQ
- Magazine Series: David Nussbaum, Ann Herolo, Anne Mendelson, Robert Sherrill, "Mother's Milk", Saveur
- Magazine Writing on Spirits, Wine & Beer: Colman Andrews, "Treasures of the Land," Saveur
- Newsletter Writing on Food, Beverage, Restaurant, and Nutrition: Cole Danehower, Oregon Wine Report
- Newspaper Feature Writing About Restaurants and/or Chefs: Russ Parsons, "Chef's Ideas, Fresh From the Market," Los Angeles Times
- Newspaper Feature Writing with Recipes: Leslie Brenner, "Forget What You Know: This is Gazpacho", Los Angeles Times
- Newspaper Feature Writing without Recipes: Kim Severson, "A Lot of Cooks in the MRE Kitchen," San Francisco Chronicle
- Newspaper Food Section with Circulation 300,000 and Above: Miriam Morgan, San Francisco Chronicle
- Newspaper Food Section with Circulation Under 300,000: Jill Wendholt Silva, The Kansas City Star
- Newspaper Restaurant Review or Critique: Alison Cook, Houston Chronicle
- Newspaper Series: Bill Ward, "Cucina Italiana," Star Tribune
- Newspaper Writing on Spirits, Wine & Beer: Barbara Hansen, "Mezcal: Good Drink, Bad Rap," Los Angeles Times
- Newspaper, Magazine or Internet Reporting on Consumer Issues, Nutrition, and/or Health: Allison J. Cleary, "Razing the Pyramid: Piece by Piece, Harvard's Walter Willett is Dismantling Nutrition Dogma That Has Fueled the Obesity Epidemic and Contributed to "Millions of Deaths", Eating Well, The Magazine of Food & Health
- Internet Writing on Food, Nutrition, Travel, Restaurant, and Beverage: Natalie MacLean, "Dining in the Wild, Wild West," www.nataliemaclean.com

== 2005 awards ==
The 2005 James Beard Awards were presented at the New York Marriott Marquis on May 2, 2005.

=== Chef and Restaurant Awards ===
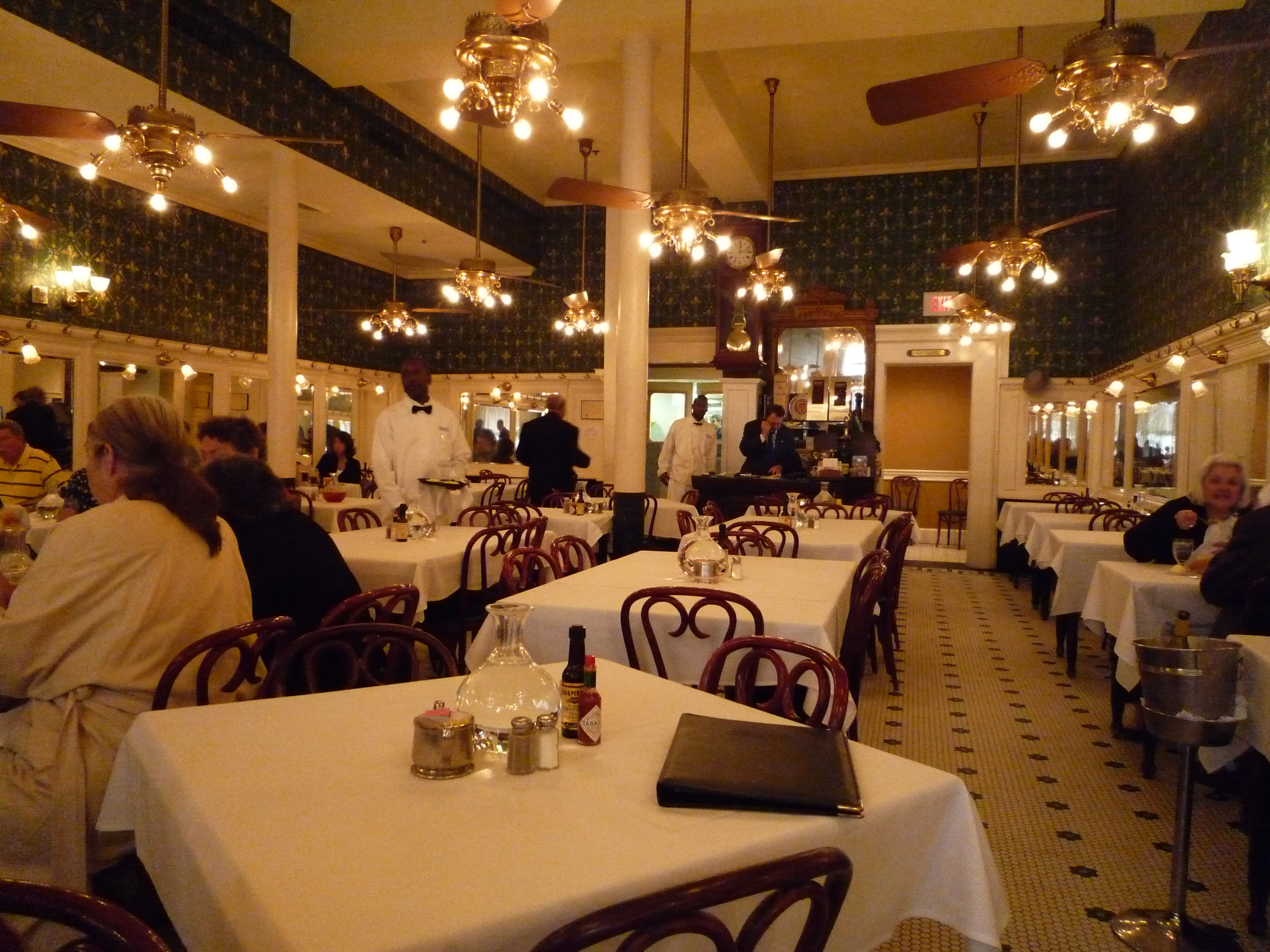
Galatoire's

Sources:

- Outstanding Chef: Mario Batali, Babbo, Esca, Lupa, Otto Enoteca Pizzeria, Casa Mono and Bistro du Vent; New York, NY
- Lifetime Achievement Award: Jacques Pépin, French Culinary Institute; New York, NY
- Humanitarian of the Year: Judy Wicks, White Dog Cafe Foundation; Philadelphia, PA
- Outstanding Restaurant: Galatoire's; New Orleans, LA
- Best New Restaurant: Per Se; New York, NY
- Outstanding Restaurateur: Danny Meyer, Union Square Hospitality Group; New York, NY
- Rising Star Chef: Christopher Lee, Striped Bass; Philadelphia, PA
- Outstanding Pastry Chef: Karen DeMasco, Craft; New York, NY
- Outstanding Service: Spago; Beverly Hills, CA
- Outstanding Wine & Spirits Professional: Joseph Bastianich, Italian Wine Merchants; New York, NY
- Outstanding Wine Service: Veritas; New York, NY
- Best Chef: California: Lee Hefter, Spago; Beverly Hills, CA
- Best Chef: Mid-Atlantic: Marc Vetri, Vetri; Philadelphia, PA
- Best Chef: Midwest: Tony Mantuano, Spiaggia; Chicago, IL
- Best Chef: New York City: Andrew Carmellini, Café Boulud; New York, NY
- Best Chef: Northeast: Ana Sortun, Oleana; Cambridge, MA
- Best Chef: Pacific Northwest: Vitaly Paley, Paley's Place; Portland, OR
- Best Chef: Southeast: Joël Antunes, Joël; Atlanta, GA
- Best Chef: Southwest: Mark Kiffin, The Compound; Santa Fe, NM
- Outstanding Restaurant Design: (tie) Thomas Schlesser Design, Avec; Chicago, IL & Studio Gaia, Solea Restaurant at the W; Mexico City
- Outstanding Restaurant Graphics: James Barondess, The Butcher Shop; Boston, MA

=== Book Awards ===
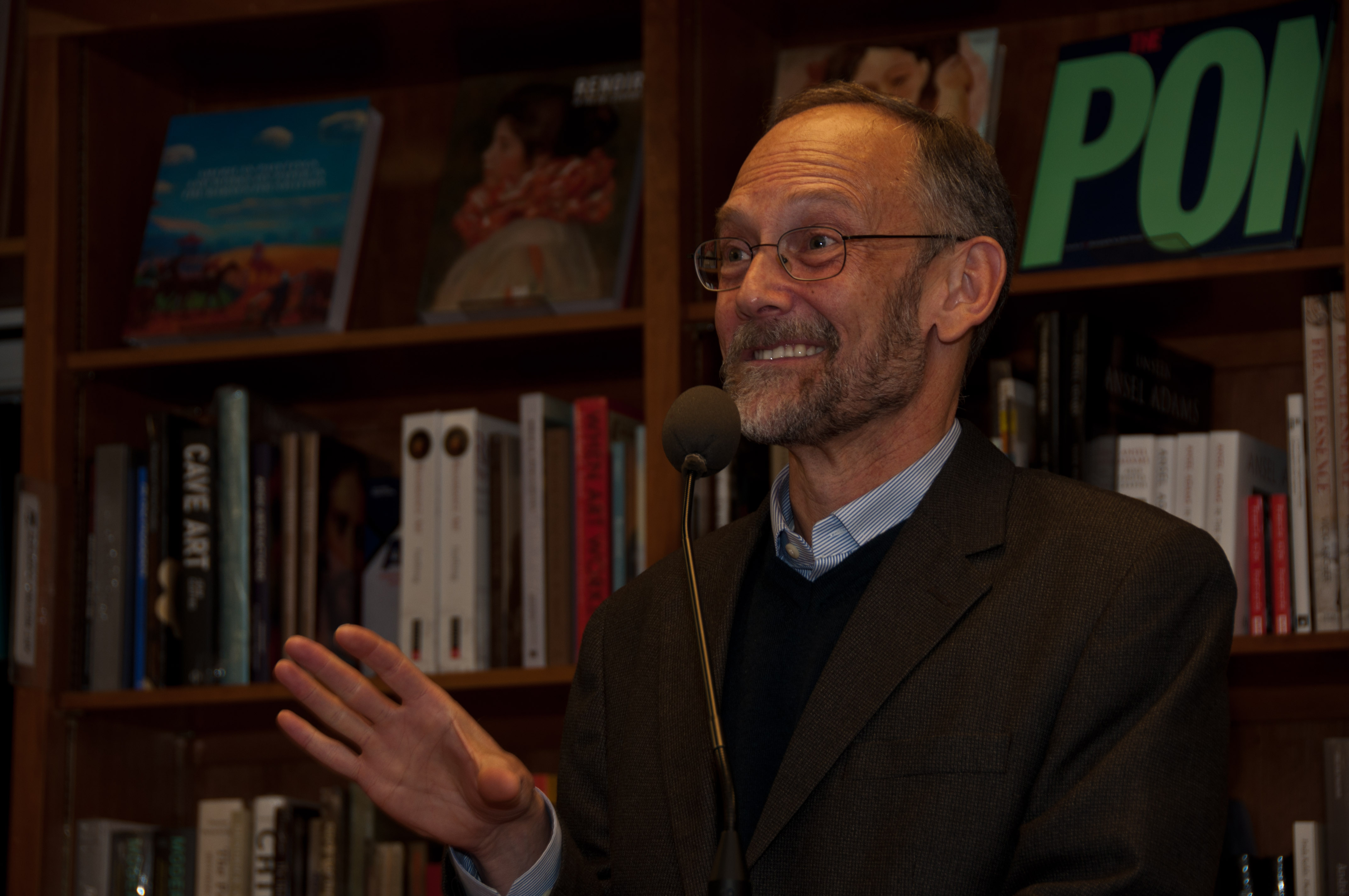
Harold McGee

Sources:

- Baking and Desserts: A Blessing of Bread: Recipes and Rituals, Memories and Mitzvah by Maggie Glezer
- Cooking from a Professional Point of View: John Ash Cooking One on One: Private Lessons in Simple, Contemporary Food from a Master Teacher by John Ash and Amy Mintzer
- Entertaining and Special Occasions: Serena, Food & Stories by Serena Bass
- Focus on Health: The New Mayo Clinic Cookbook by Maureen Callahan, R.D. & Cheryl Forberg, R.D.
- Food of the Americas: Food of the Americas: Native Recipes and Traditions by Fernando and Marlene Divina
- General: Weir Cooking in the City by Joanne Weir
- International: Provence Cookbook by Patricia Wells
- KitchenAid Cookbook Hall of Fame: The Great Scandinavian Baking Book by Beatrice Ojakangas
- KitchenAid Cookbook of the Year: Rick Stein's Complete Seafood by Rick Stein
- Photography: Bouchon by Deborah Jones
- Reference: On Food and Cooking by Harold McGee
- Single Subject: All About Braising by Molly Stevens
- Vegetarian: Olive Trees and Honey: A Treasury of Vegetarian Recipes from Jewish Communities Around the World by Gil Marks
- Wine and Spirits: Scotch Whisky by Charles MacLean
- Writing on Food: Last Chance to Eat by Gina Mallet

=== Broadcast Media Awards ===
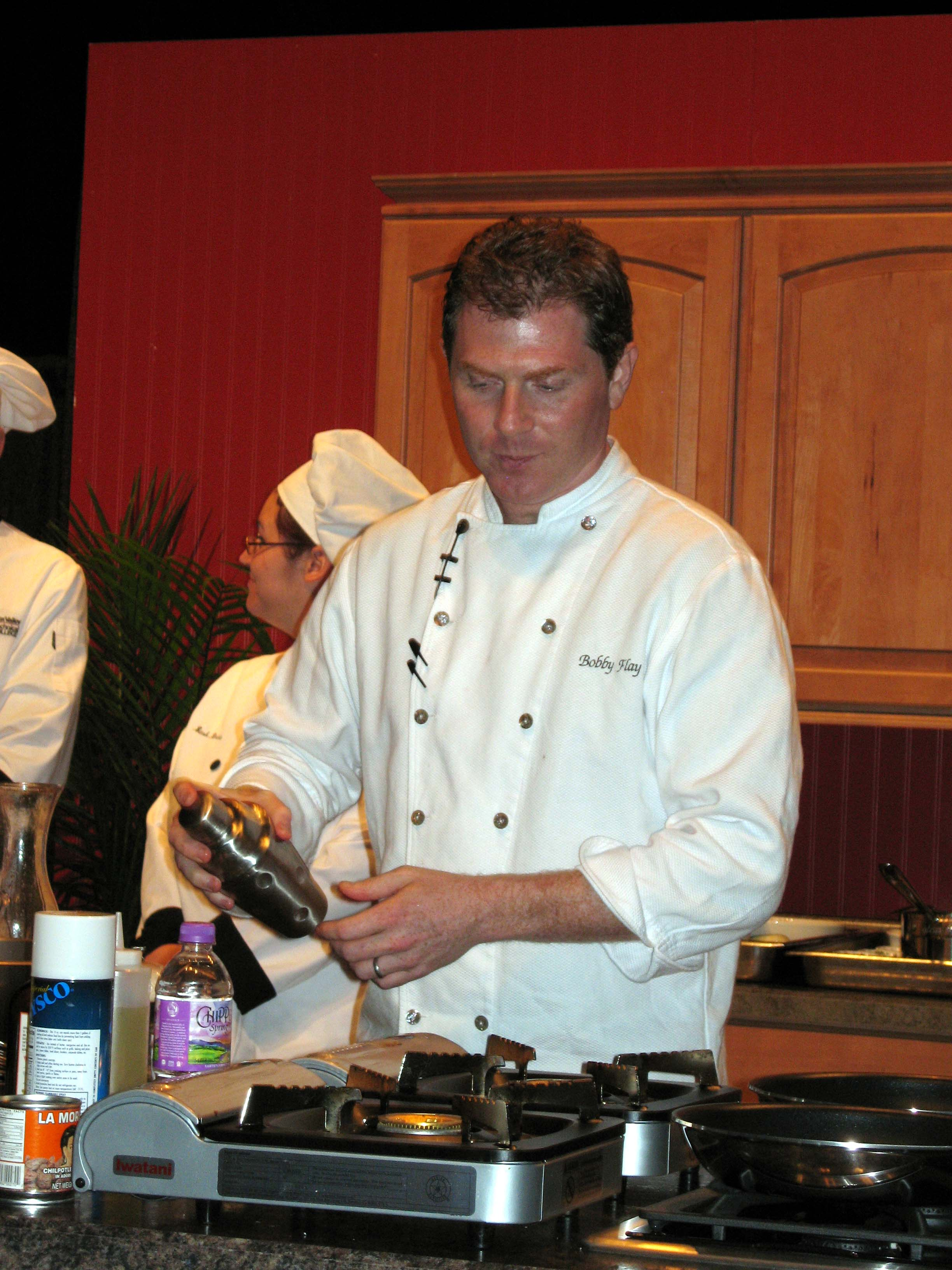
Bobby Flay

- Best Local Television Cooking Show: "In Wine Country: Cool Kitchen," NBC (San Francisco), Mary Babbitt
- Best National Television Cooking Show: "Bobby Flay Chef Mentor," Bobby Flay, Food Network
- Best Television Food Segment: Martha Stewart Living, Martha Stewart
- Best Local Radio Show: Holiday Special, WCCO-AM/CBS (Minnesota and Wisconsin), Sue Zelickson
- Best National Radio Show: P.R.I.'s the World, Public Radio International, Steve Dolinsky

=== Journalism Awards ===
- M.F.K. Fisher Distinguished Writing Award: Mei Chin, "Eat Drink Mother Daughter," Saveur
- Newspaper Feature Writing About Restaurants and/or Chefs: Rick Nelson, "Sweet Success," Star Tribune
- Newspaper Feature Writing with Recipes: Kitty Crider, "Anything for Mother: Remembering One February Morning with Mom and a Batch of Angel Biscuits," Austin American-Statesman
- Newspaper Feature Writing without Recipes: Dai Huynh, "A Mountain of Hope," Houston Chronicle
- Newspaper Food Section: Suzanne Martinson, Pittsburgh Post-Gazette
- Newspaper Columns: Todd Kliman, "Auteur de Force," "Mex Appeal," "Kid You Not," Washington City Paper
- Newspaper Writing on Spirits, Wine & Beer: Allie Johnson, "Wine Makes Us Wet," The Pitch; Kansas City, MO
- Newspaper, Magazine or Internet Reporting on Nutrition or Food-Related Consumer Issues: Malcolm Gay, "Eat Me," Riverfront Times
- Magazine Feature about Restaurants and/or Chefs: Miles Chapin, "Through the Doors of Luchow's," Saveur
- Magazine Feature with Recipes: Julie Powell, "The Trouble with Blood: A Modern Chef Takes on the Challenge of Ancient Cooking," Archaeology Magazine
- Magazine Feature without Recipes: James Lawrence, Catch of the Day: Choosing the Right Seafood in a World of Scaremongers, Fishmongers, and Scientists Trolling for Credible Answers," EatingWell Magazine
- Magazine Restaurant Review or Critique: Alan Richman, "The Restaurant Commandments," "The Thing That Ate New York," "Stick a Fork in Jean-Georges," GQ
- Magazine Columns: Lettie Teague, "Wine Matters - Educating Peter", Food & Wine
- Magazine Writing on Spirits, Wine & Beer: NAtalie MacLean, "Waiter, There's a Flaw in My Wine," Ottawa City Magazine
- Newsletter Writing on Food, Beverage, Restaurant, and Nutrition: Gregory S. Walter, PinotReport
- Internet Writing on Food, Restaurant, Beverage, or Nutrition: Jennifer Rosen, "When Corks Attack - They Do It With TCA," Vinchotzi.com

== 2006 awards ==
The 2006 James Beard Awards were presented at the New York Marriott Marquis on May 8, 2006, with Cokie Roberts serving as master of ceremonies. The journalism awards were presented the previous evening at the Grand Hyatt New York.

=== Chef and Restaurant Awards ===
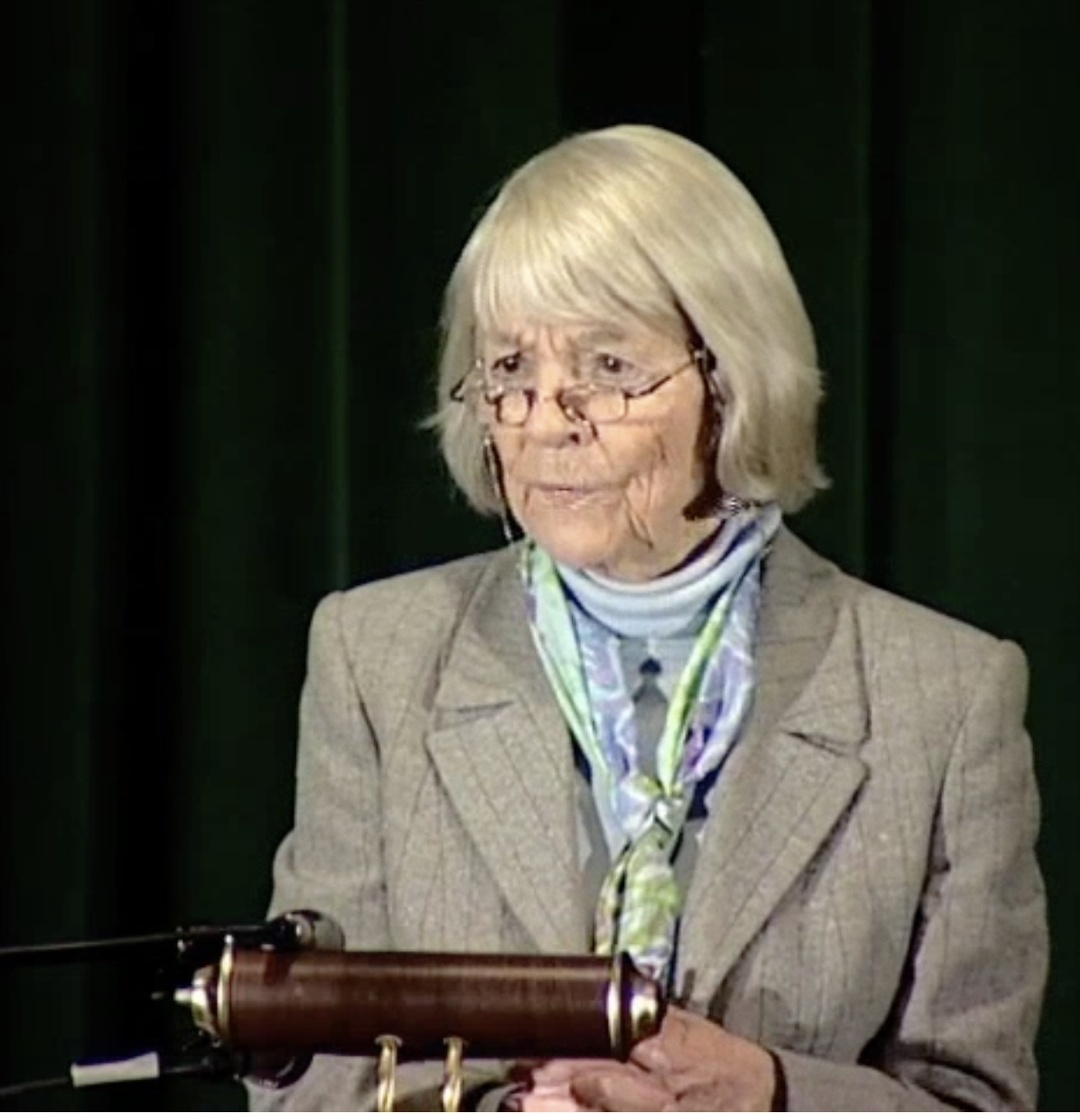
Judith Jones

- Outstanding Chef: Alfred Portale, Gotham Bar & Grill; New York, NY
- Lifetime Achievement Award: Judith Jones, Alfred A. Knopf; New York, NY
- Humanitarian of the Year: The restaurants of New Orleans, LA
- Outstanding Restaurant: The French Laundry; Yountville, CA
- Best New Restaurant: The Modern, Danny Meyer; New York, NY
- Outstanding Restaurateur: Daniel Boulud, The Dinex Group; New York, NY
- Rising Star Chef: Corey Lee, The French Laundry; Yountville, CA
- Outstanding Pastry Chef: Johnny Iuzzini, Jean Georges; New York, NY
- Outstanding Service: Gary Danko; San Francisco, CA
- Outstanding Wine & Spirits Professional: Daniel Johnnes, Daniel; New York, NY
- Outstanding Wine Service: Aureole; Las Vegas, NV
- Best Chef: California: Suzanne Goin, Lucques; West Hollywood, CA
- Best Chef: Mid-Atlantic: Fabio Trabocchi, Maestro at The Ritz-Carlton; Tysons Corner, VA
- Best Chef: Midwest: Shawn McClain, Spring; Chicago, IL
- Best Chef: New York City: Dan Barber, Blue Hill; New York, NY
- Best Chef: Northeast: Jean-Louis Gerin, Jean-Louis; Greenwich, CT
- Best Chef: Pacific Northwest: Scott Carsberg, Lampreia; Seattle, WA
- Best Chef: Southeast: John Besh, Restaurant August; New Orleans, LA
- Best Chef: Southwest: Bradford Thompson, Mary Elaine's at The Phoenician; Scottsdale, AZ
- Outstanding Restaurant Design: Bentel & Bentel Architects/Planners LLP, The Modern; New York, NY
- Outstanding Restaurant Graphics: Mucca Design Corporation, Sant Ambroeus; New York, NY

=== Book Awards ===
Sources:

- Baking and Desserts: Dough: Simple Contemporary Bread by Nick Malgieri
- Cooking from a Professional Point of View: Sunday Suppers at Lucques by Suzanne Goin
- Entertaining and Special Occasions: Simple Soirées: Seasonal Menus for Sensational Dinner Parties by Peggy Knickerbocker
- Healthy Focus: Spices of Life: Simple and Delicious Recipes for Great Health by Nina Simonds
- Food of the Americas: The New American Cooking by Joan Nathan
- General: The Cook's Book by Jill Norman
- International: Molto Italiano by Mario Batali
- Cookbook Hall of Fame: An Invitation to Indian Cooking by Madhur Jaffrey
- Cookbook of the Year: Hungry Planet: What the World Eats by Peter Menzel and Faith D'Aluisio
- Photography: Nobu Now by Elichi Takahashi
- Reference: Cheese: A Connoisseur's Guide to the World's Best by Max McCalman and David Gibbons
- Single Subject: Bones: Recipes, History & Lore by Jennifer McLagan
- Wine and Spirits: Whiskey by Michael Jackson
- Writings on Food: Hungry Planet: What the World Eats by Peter Menzel and Faith D'Aluisio

=== Broadcast Media Awards ===
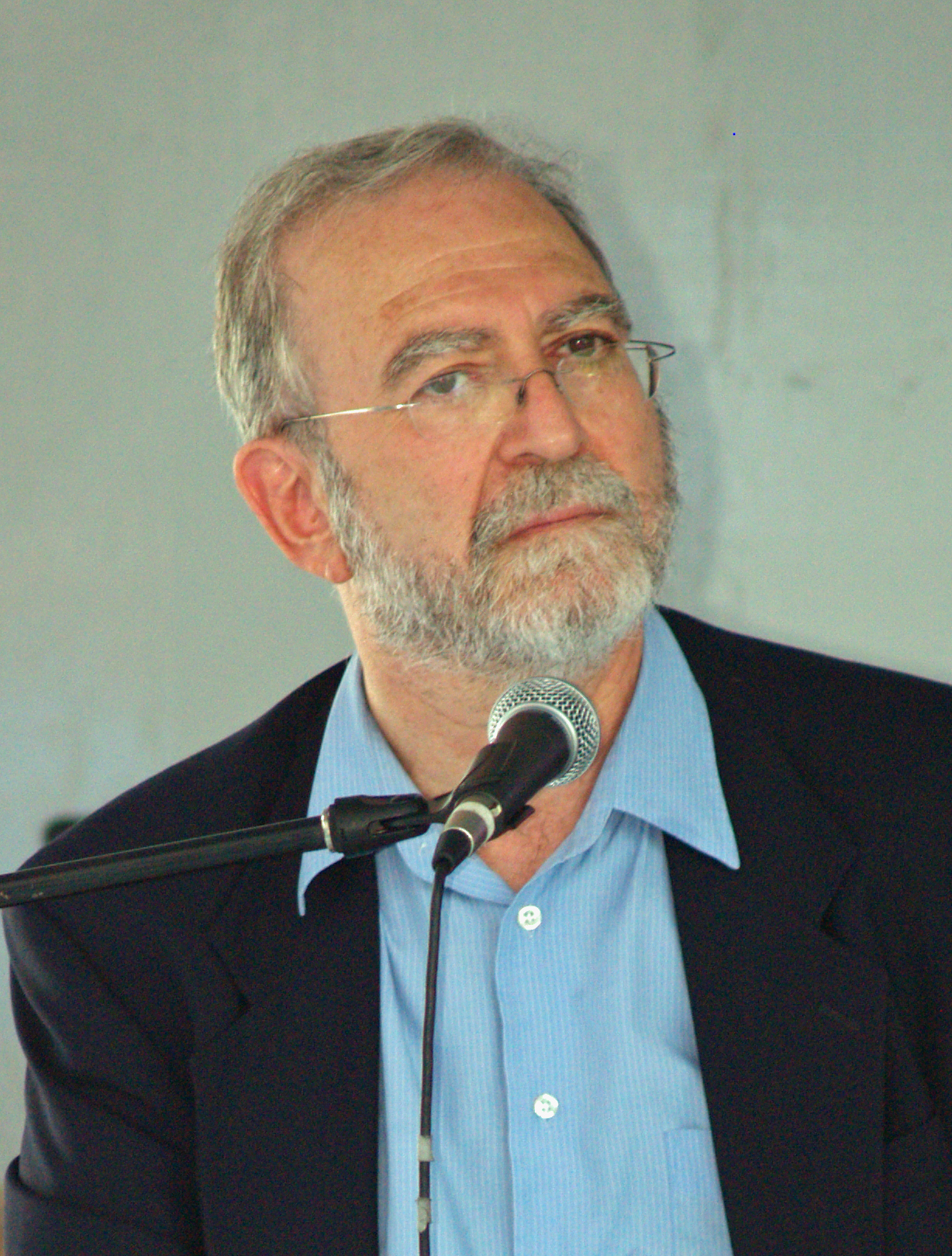
Leonard Lopate

- Best Television Food Segment: ABC 7 News at 11:00 (a.m.), Steve Dolinsky, WLS-TV
- Best Television Food Special: Chefs A' Field: Featuring Four Chefs, PBS, Heidi Hanson and Chris Warner
- Best Local Television Cooking Show: "Bay Cafe," Joey Altman, KRON-TV, San Francisco Bay Area
- Best National Television Cooking Show: "How to Cook Everything," Mark Bittman, PBS
- Best Radio Show: The Leonard Lopate Show, Leonard Lopate, WNYC
- Best Webcast: Spatulatta.com, Isabella Gerasole and Olivia Gerasole

=== Journalism Awards ===
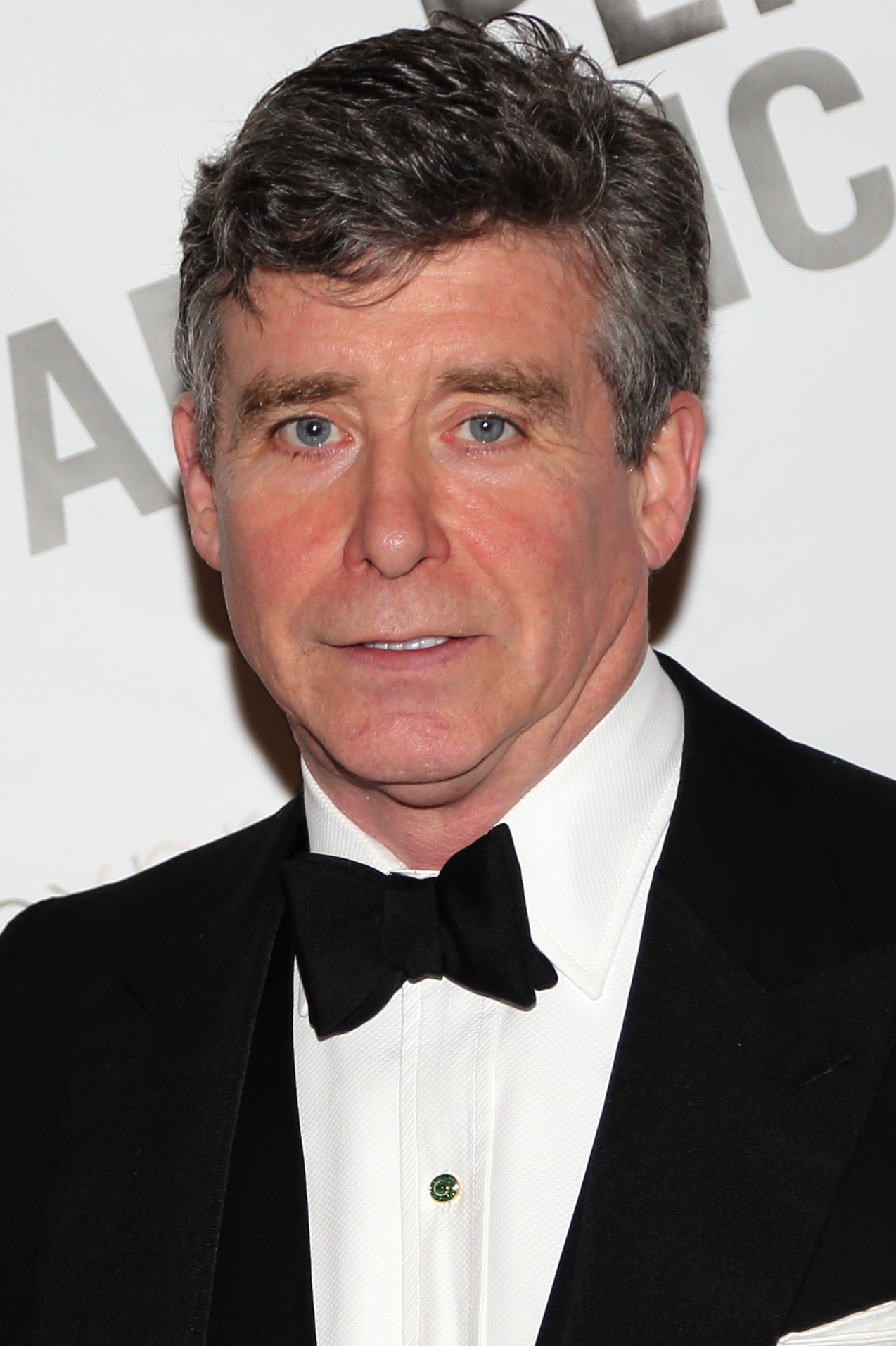
Jay McInerney

Sources:

- M.F.K. Fisher Distinguished Writing Award: Jay McInerney, Departures (magazine), "Will Alain Ducasse Take Over the World?"
- Newspaper Feature Writing About Restaurants and/or Chefs: Brett Anderson, The Times-Picayune, "The Natural"
- Newspaper Feature Writing with Recipes: Carolynn Carreño, Los Angeles Times, "Cubism Makes a Comeback: In An Era of Slow Food You'd Be Surprised Who's Plopping Bouillon Cubes in Coq Au Vin, Chiles Rellenos or Even Sheep's Milk Ricotta Ravioli"
- Newspaper Feature Writing without Recipes: Kristen Hinman, Riverfront Times, "Something Fishy"
- Newspaper Restaurant Review or Critique: Jonathan Gold, LA Weekly, "Great Balls O' Rice", "Raw Power", "The Revolutionary"
- Newspaper or Magazine Reporting on Nutrition or Food-Related Consumer Issues: Jonathan Kauffman, East Bay Express, "Endangered Species"
- Newspaper or Magazine Columns: Pete Wells, Food & Wine, Always Hungry: "Four Star Baby Food", "Can a Restaurant be Cloned?", "Is Lard Health Food?"
- Newspaper Writing on Spirits, Wine & Beer: Dara Moskowitz, City Pages (Minneapolis), "Wine & Dine 2005: The World in a Bottle: New Tastes From the Old World"
- Internet Writing on Food, Restaurant, Beverage, or Nutrition: Sara Dickerman, Slate (magazine), "Down with Gloves: Why Chefs Shouldn't Have to Wear Them"
- Magazine Feature with Recipes: Dorie Greenspan, Bon Appétit, "When French Women Bake..."
- Magazine Feature without Recipes: Patricia Sharpe, Texas Monthly, "Confessions of a Skinny Bitch"
- Magazine Restaurant Review or Critique: Patric Kuh, Los Angeles Magazine, "In the Raw", "Steak Out", "Seaworld"
- Magazine Writing on Spirits, Wine & Beer: Pete Wells, Food & Wine, "A Cocktail Purist"
- Internet Website for Food: leitesculinaria.com, David Leite
- Newspaper Section with circulation under 300,000: The Denver Post, Kristen Browning-Blas
- Newspaper Section with circulation 300,000 and above: San Francisco Chronicle, Miriam Morgan and Linda Murphy

== 2007 awards ==
The 2007 James Beard Awards were presented on May 7, 2007, and more than 1,600 people attended the reception at New York's Lincoln Center. The media awards were presented the previous night at the Millennium Broadway hotel.

=== Chef and Restaurant Awards ===
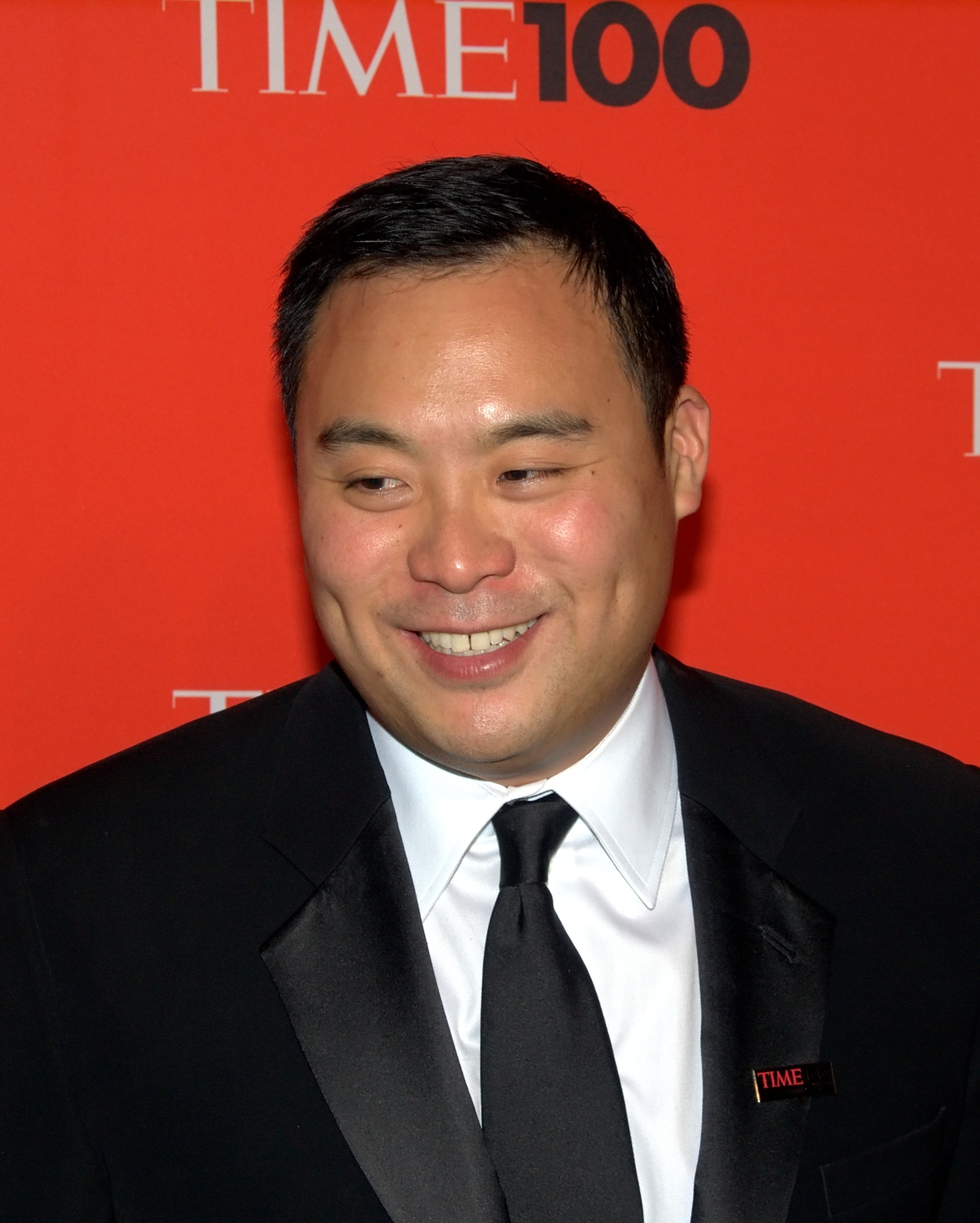
David Chang

Sources:

- Chef: Michel Richard, Michel Richard Citronelle, Washington, DC
- Lifetime Achievement: Barbara Kafka
- Humanitarian: Art Smith, Common Threads
- Rising Star Chef of the Year: David Chang, Momofuku Noodle Bar, New York, NY
- Restaurant: Rick Bayless and Deann Bayless, Frontera Grill, Chicago, IL
- New Restaurant: Joël Robuchon, L'Atelier de Joël Robuchon, New York, NY
- Restaurateur: Thomas Keller, The French Laundry, Yountville, CA
- Pastry Chef: Michael Laiskonis, Le Bernardin, New York, NY
- Wine Service: Mark Slater, Michel Richard Citronelle, Washington, D.C.
- Wine and Spirits Professional: Paul Draper, Ridge Vineyards, Cupertino, CA
- Service: Rick Tramonto, Gale Gand, and Rich Melman, Tru, Chicago, IL
- Great Lakes Chef: Grant Achatz, Chicago, IL
- Mid-Atlantic Chef: R. J. Cooper III, Vidalia, and Frank Ruta, Palena, both in Washington, D.C.
- Midwest Chef: Celina Tio, The American Restaurant, Kansas City, MO
- New York City Chef: David Waltuck, Chanterelle, New York, NY
- Northeast Chef: Frank McClelland, L'Espalier, Boston, MA
- Northwest Chef: John Sundstrom, Lark, Seattle, WA
- Pacific Chef: Traci Des Jardins, Jardinière, San Francisco, CA
- Southeast Chef: Scott Peacock, Watershed, Decatur, GA
- Southwest Chef: Nobuo Fukuda, Sea Saw, Scottsdale, AZ
- South Chef: Donald Link, Herbsaint, New Orleans, LA
- Restaurant Design: LTL Architects, Xing Restaurant, New York, NY
- Restaurant Graphics, Baron and Baron, Buddakan, New York, NY

=== Book Awards ===
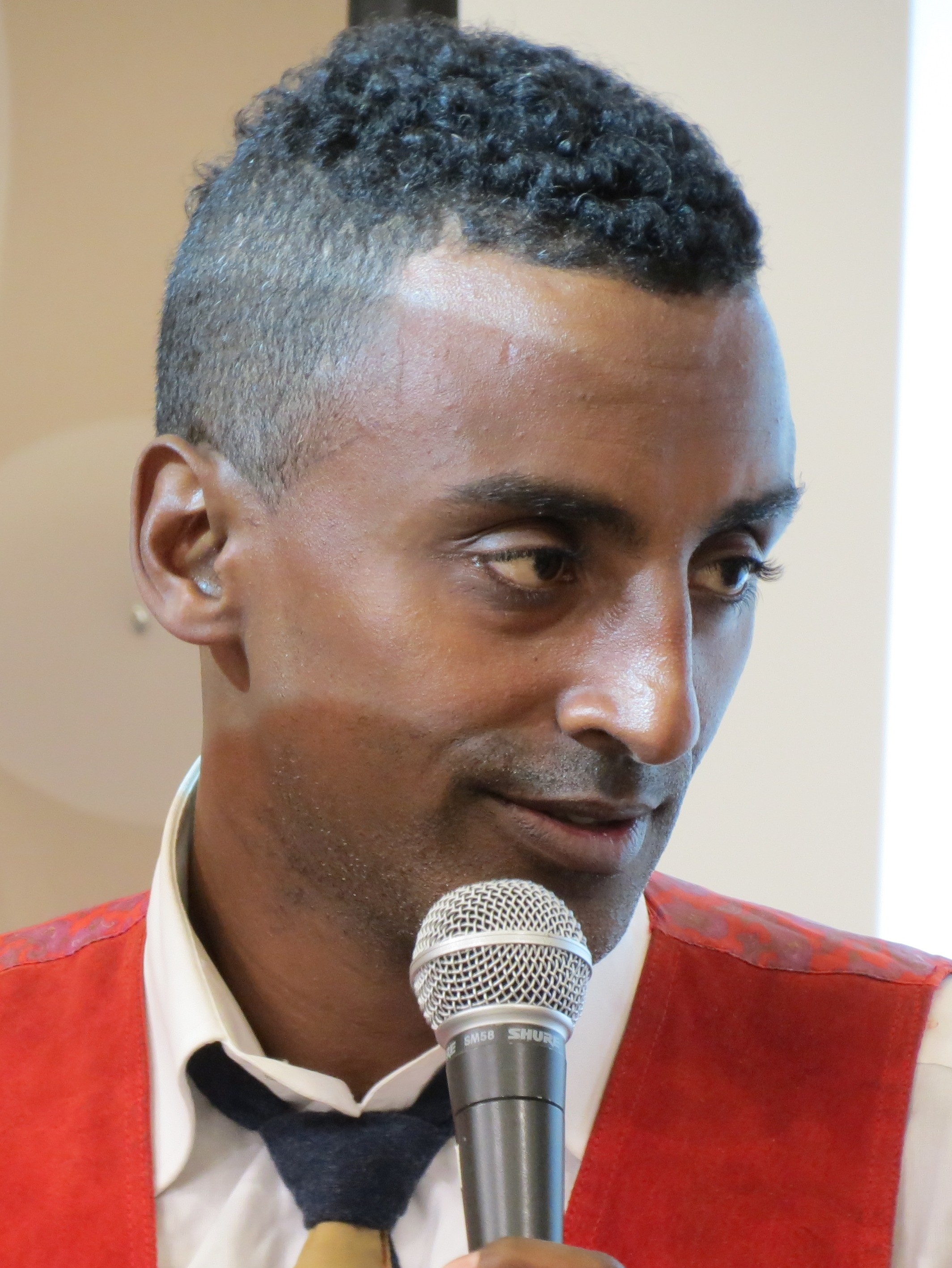
Marcus Samuelsson

Sources:

- Asian Cooking: Cradle of Flavor by James Oseland
- Baking and Dessert: Baking: From my Home to Yours by Dorie Greenspan
- Cooking from a Professional Point of View: Grand Livre De Cuisine: Alain Ducasse's Desserts and Pastries by Alain Ducasse and Frederic Robert
- Entertaining: The Big Book of Outdoor Cooking and Entertaining by Cheryl Alters Jamison and Bill Jamison
- Healthy Focus: Whole Grains Every Day, Every Way by Lorna Sass
- Food of the Americas: The Lee Bros. Southern Cookbook by Matt Lee and Ted Lee
- General: Tasty: Get Great Food on the Table Every Day by Roy Finamore
- International: The Soul of a New Cuisine by Marcus Samuelsson
- Cookbook Hall of Fame: Moosewood Cookbook by Mollie Katzen
- Cookbook of the Year: The Lee Bros. Southern Cookbook by Matt Lee and Ted Lee
- Photography: Michael Mina by Karl Petzke
- Reference: What to Eat by Marion Nestle
- Single Subject: The Essence of Chocolate by John Scharffenberger and Robert Steinberg
- Wine and Spirits: Romancing the Vine by Alan Tardi
- Writing on Food: The Omnivore's Dilemma by Michael Pollan

=== Journalism Awards ===
- Newspaper Feature Writing About Restaurants and/or Chefs With or Without Recipes: Barbara Yost, The Arizona Republic, "Bringing a Restaurant to Life"
- Newspaper Feature Writing With Recipes: Janet Fletcher, San Francisco Chronicle, "Bringing Duck Home"
- Newspaper Feature Writing Without Recipes: Elaine Cicora, Cleveland Scene, "Soul Kitchen"
- Newspaper or Magazine Restaurant Review or Critique: Rebekah Denn, Seattle Post-Intelligencer, "Heads Up on Lovely Veil: Not One of the Best Yet", "We Went Trolling for the City's Best Crab Cakes", "Tiny Sitka and Spruce Makes a Big Splash"
- Newspaper, Newsletter or Magazine Reporting on Nutrition or Food-Related Consumer Issues: Colleen Pierce, R.D., Child Magazine, "Solving the Sugar Crisis"
- Newspaper, Newsletter or Magazine Columns: Dara Moskowitz, City Pages (Minneapolis), "Take the Cannoli", "The Importance of Burgers", "Weirded Out By Wine"'
- Newspaper Writing on Spirits, Wine, or Beer: (Tie) Eric Felten, The Wall Street Journal, "He Drinks, She Drinks" & Dara Moskowitz, City Pages (Minneapolis), "Asked and Answered"
- Magazine Feature Writing About Restaurants and/or Chefs With or Without Recipes: James Villas, Saveur, "Vive le Restaurant"
- Magazine Feature Writing With Recipes: Colman Andrews, Saveur, "Ireland - From Farm to Fork"
- Magazine Feature Writing Without Recipes: Scott Simon, Gourmet, "Conflict Cuisine"
- Magazine Writing on Spirits, Wine, or Beer: Fiona Morrison, MW, Wine & Spirits, "Chambolle-Musigny"
- Newspaper Section: San Francisco Chronicle, Miriam Morgan and Jon Bonne
- Website Focusing on Food, Beverage, Restaurant or Nutrition: Leite's Culinaria, David Leite and Linda Avery
- Multi-Media Writing on Food, Beverage, Restaurant or Nutrition: Edward Deitch, MSNBC.com/NBC Mobile, "On the Trail of Great Californian Syrah"
- MFK Fisher Distinguished Writing Award: Jesse Katz, Los Angeles Magazine, "Wheels of Fortune"

=== Broadcast Media Awards ===
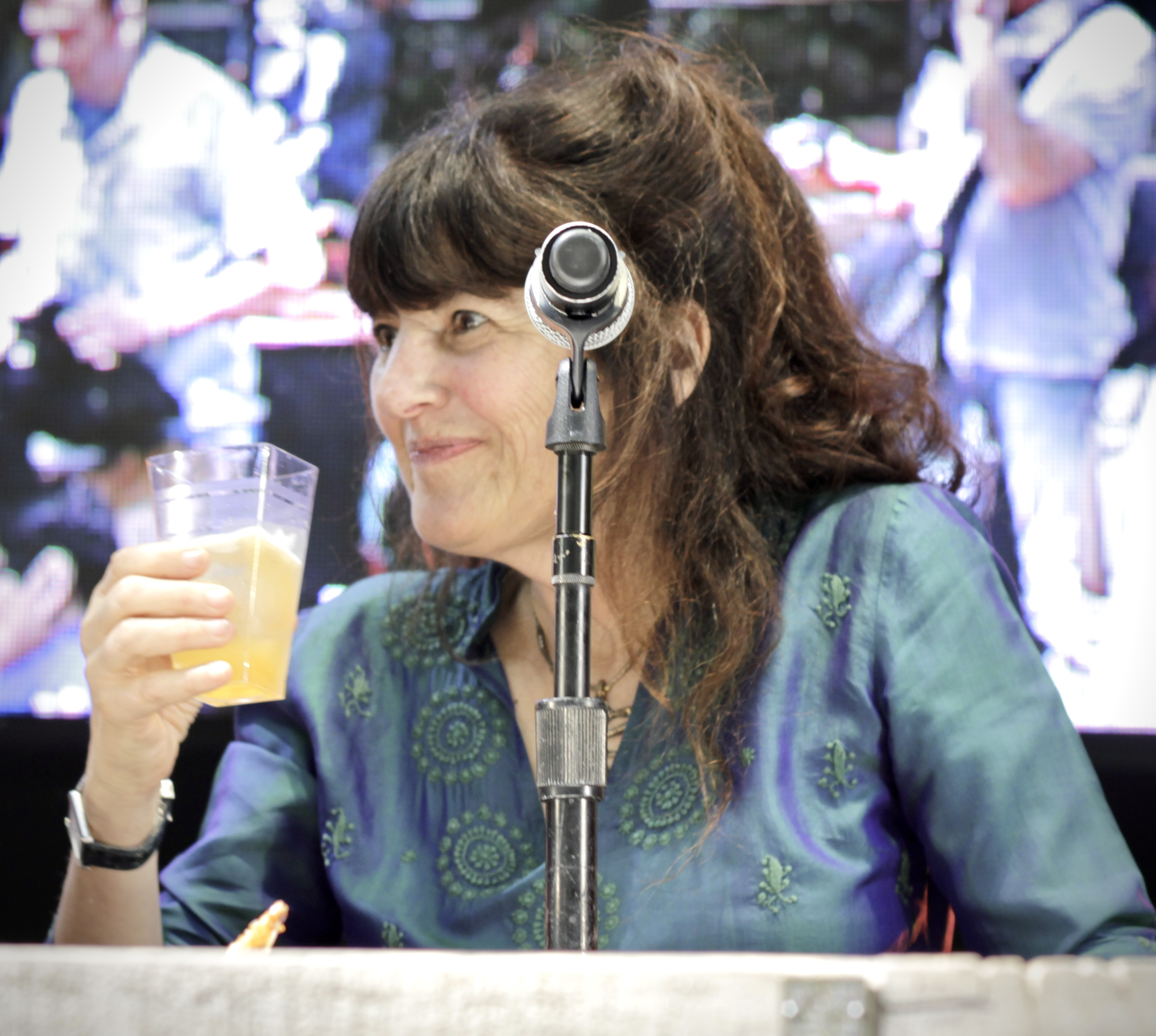
Ruth Reichl

- Best Television Food Segment: CBS News "Sunday Morning," Martha A. Teichner
- Best Television Food Special: "Food Trip with Todd English," Todd English, PBS
- Best Local Television Cooking Show: "Check, Please! Bay Area," Leslie Sbrocco, KQED
- Best National Television Cooking Show: "Gourmet's Diary of a Foodie," Ruth Reichl, PBS
- Best Radio Show: The Leonard Lopate Show's Holiday Recipe Swap, Leonard Lopate, WNYC
- Best Webcast: Savoring the Best of World Flavors: Volume One: India, Spain, Mexico and Thailand, John Barkley, www.ciaprochef.com

== 2008 awards ==
The 2008 James Beard Awards were presented on June 8, 2008, at New York's Lincoln Center.

=== Chef and Restaurant Awards ===
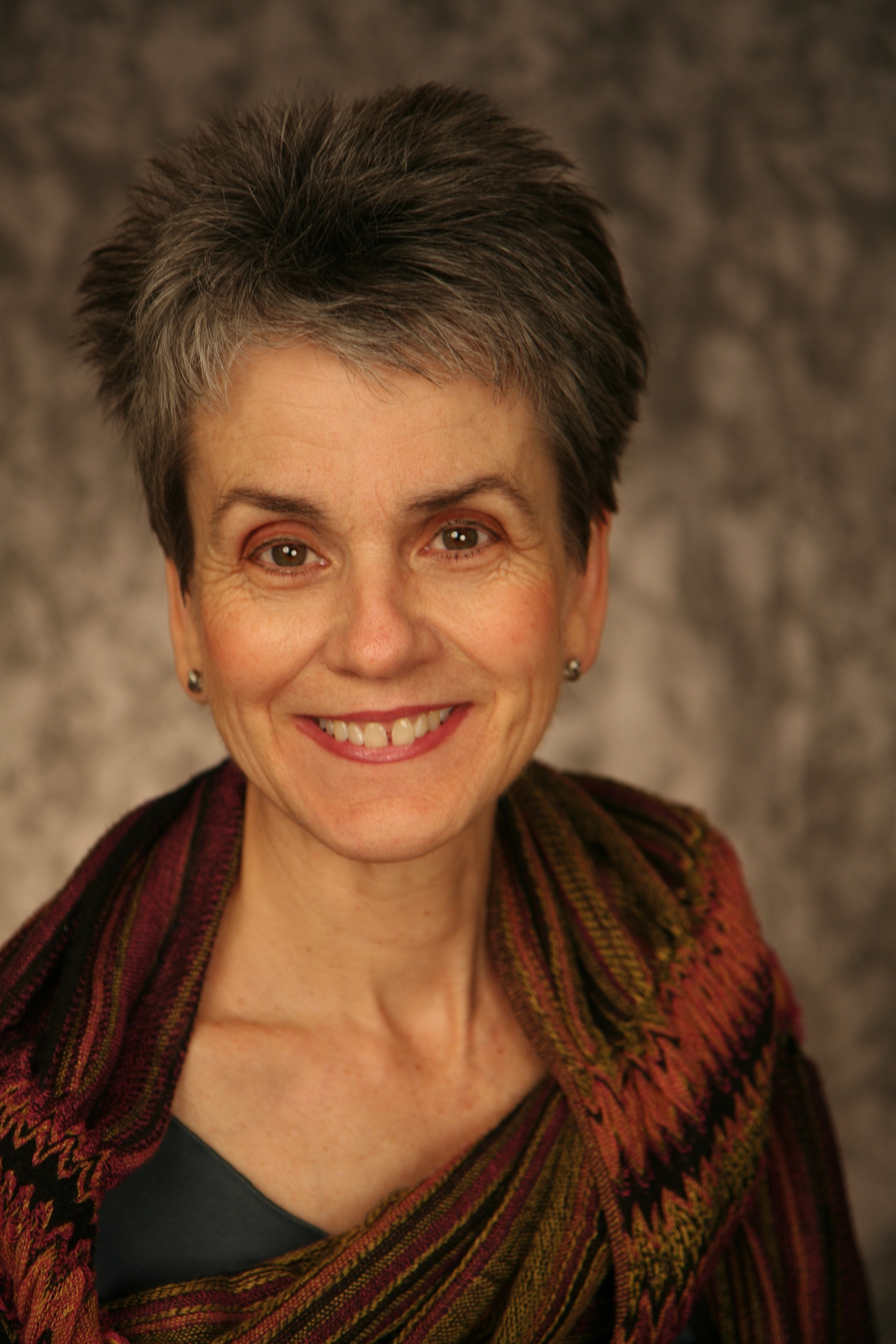
Frances Moore Lappé

Sources:

- Chef: Grant Achatz, Alinea, Chicago, IL
- Lifetime Achievement Award: Fritz Maytag
- Humanitarian: Frances Moore Lappé
- Rising Star Chef of the Year: Gavin Kaysen, Café Boulud, New York, NY
- Restaurant: Danny Meyer and John Schaefer, Gramercy Tavern, New York, NY
- New Restaurant: Michel Richard, Central Michel Richard, Washington, D.C.
- Restaurateur: Mario Batali and Joe Bastianich, Babbo Ristorante, New York, NY
- Pastry Chef: Elisabeth Prueitt and Chad Robertson, Tartine Bakery, San Francisco, CA
- Wine Service: John Ragan, Eleven Madison Park, New York, NY
- Wine and Spirits Professional: Terry Theise, Terry Theise Estate Selections, Silver Spring, MD
- Service: Hiro Sone and Lisa Doumani, Terra, Helena, CA
- Great Lakes Chef: Carrie Nahabedian, Naha, Chicago, IL
- Mid-Atlantic Chef: Eric Ziebold, CityZen, Washington, D.C.
- Midwest Chef: Adam Siegel, Bartolotta's Lake Park Bistro, Milwaukee, WI
- New York City Chef: David Chang, Momofuku Ssäm Bar, New York, NY
- Northeast Chef: Patrick Connolly, Radius, Boston, MA
- Northwest Chef: Holly Smith, Café Juanita, Kirkland, WA
- Pacific Chef: Craig Stoll, Delfina, San Francisco, CA
- Southeast Chef: Robert Stehling, Hominy Grill, Charleston, SC
- Southwest Chef: Lachlan Mackinnon-Patterson, Frasca Food and Wine, Boulder, CO
- South Chef: Michelle Bernstein, Michy's, Miami, FL
- Newspaper or Magazine: Brad A. Johnson, Modern Luxury

=== Book Awards ===
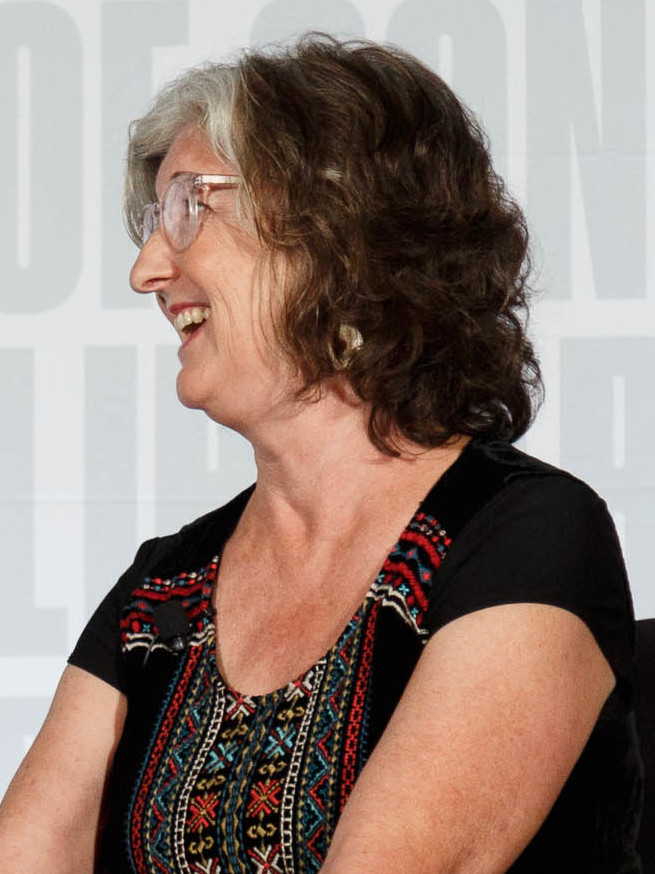
Barbara Kingsolver

Sources:

- Cookbook of the year: The River Cottage Meat Book by Hugh Fearnley-Whittingstall
- Asian Cooking: My Bombay Kitchen: Traditional and Modern Parsi Home Cooking by Niloufer Ichaporia King
- American Cooking: A Love Affair with Southern Cooking by Jean Anderson
- Baking and Dessert: Peter Reinhart's Whole Grain Breads: New Techniques, Extraordinary Flavor by Peter Reinhart
- Cooking from a Professional Point of View: The Fundamental Techniques of Classic Cuisine by The French Culinary Institute with Judith Choate
- Entertaining: Dish Entertains by Trish Magwood
- General Cooking: Cooking by James Peterson
- Focus on Health: The EatingWell Diet by Jean Harvey-Berino
- International: The Country Cooking of France by Anne Willan
- Photography: The Country Cooking of France by France Ruffenach
- Reference and Scholarship: A Geography of Oysters: The Connoisseur's Guide to Oyster Eating in North America by Rowan Jacobsen
- Single Subject: The River Cottage Meat Book by Hugh Fearnley-Whittingstall
- Wine and Spirits: Imbibe!: From Absinthe Cocktail to Whiskey Smash, a Salute in Stories and Drinks to "Professor" Jerry Thomas, Pioneer of the American Bar by David Wondrich
- Writing and Literature: Animal, Vegetable, Miracle: A Year of Food Life by Barbara Kingsolver
- Cookbook Hall of Fame: Couscous and Other Good Food from Morocco by Paula Wolfert

=== Journalism Awards ===
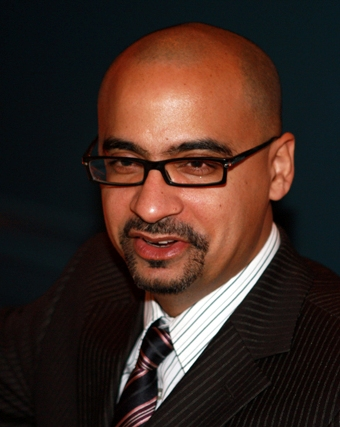
Junot Díaz

Sources:

- Newspaper Feature Writing About Restaurants and/or Chefs: Brett Anderson, The Times-Picayune, "Landmark Decisions: A Five-Part Series Chronicling the Ruin and Restoration of a Classic New Orleans Restaurant"
- Newspaper Feature Writing Without Recipes: David Leite, The New York Times, "In a '64 T-Bird, Chasing a Date With a Clam"
- Newspaper Feature Writing with Recipes: Katy McLaughlin, The Wall Street Journal, "A New Taste Sensation"
- Magazine Feature Writing About Restaurants and/or Chefs: Howie Kahn, GQ, "The Wandering Chef"
- Magazine Feature Writing with Recipes: Betty Fussell, Saveur, "American Prime"
- Magazine Feature Writing Without Recipes: Manny Howard, New York Magazine, "My Empire of Dirt"
- Restaurant Reviews: Brad A. Johnson, Angeleno, "Hampton's," "Sona," "The Penthouse"
- Reporting on Nutrition or Food-Related Consumer Issues: Peter Jaret, EatingWell, "The Search for the Anti-Aging Diet"
- Food Related Columns: Corby Kummer, The Atlantic, "The Rise of the Sardine," "The Art of Aging Well," "The Magic Brewing Machine"
- Writing on Spirits, Wine, or Beer: David Darlington, Wine & Spirits Magazine, "Postmodern Deliciousness: The World According to Clark Smith"
- Website Focusing on Food, Beverage, Restaurant, or Nutrition: Epicurious.com, Tanya Steel
- Multimedia Writing on Food: Josh Ozersky and Daniel Maurer, Nymag.com, "Grub Street"
- MFK Fisher Distinguished Writing Award: Junot Díaz, Gourmet, "He'll Take El Alto"

=== Broadcast Media Awards ===
Sources:

- Best Television Food Segment: "The Victory Garden," Michel Nischan, PBS
- Best Television Food Special: "Top Chef Holiday Special," Tom Colicchio and Padma Lakshmi, Bravo Top Chef
- Best Television Food Show: "Gourmet's Diary of a Foodie," American Public Television, Ruth Reichl
- Best Radio Food Show: "The Splendid Table," Lynne Rosetto Kasper, American Public Media
- Best Webcast: "Stewards of the Land," Jay Selman, Mark Ryan, Brian Clark and Eric Anderson, Graperadio.com

== 2009 awards ==
The 2009 James Beard Awards were presented on May 4, 2009, at New York's Lincoln Center, in a ceremony hosted by Cat Cora, Emeril Lagasse and Stanley Tucci.

=== Chef and Restaurant Awards ===
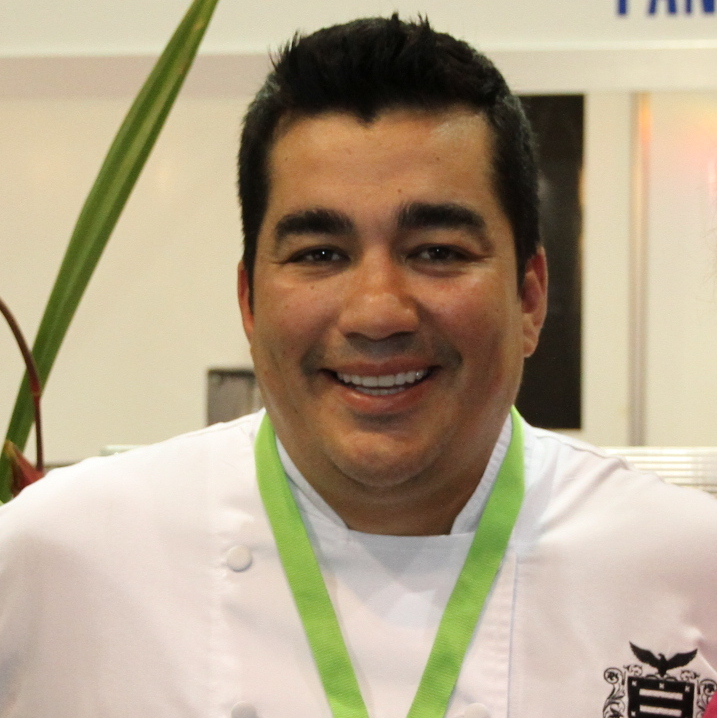
Jose Garces

Sources:

- Chef: Dan Barber, Blue Hill, New York, NY
- Lifetime Achievement Award: Ella Brennan
- Humanitarian: Feeding America
- Rising Star Chef of the Year: Nate Appleman, A16, San Francisco, CA
- Restaurant: Jean-Georges Vongerichten and Phil Suarez, Jean Georges, New York, NY
- New Restaurant: David Chang and Peter Serpico, Momofuku Ko, New York, NY
- Restaurateur: Drew Nieporent, Myriad Restaurant Group, New York, NY
- Pastry Chef: Gina DePalma, Babbo, New York, NY
- Wine Service: Aldo Sohm, Le Bernardin, New York, NY
- Wine and Spirits Professional: Dale DeGroff, Dale DeGroff Co., New York, NY
- Service: Daniel Boulud, Daniel, New York, NY
- Great Lakes Chef: Michael Symon, Lola, Cleveland, OH
- Mid-Atlantic Chef: Jose Garces, Amada, Philadelphia, PA
- Midwest Chef: Tim McKee, La Belle Vie, Minneapolis, MN
- New York City Chef: Gabriel Kreuther, The Modern, New York, NY
- Northeast Chef: Rob Evans, Hugo's, Portland, ME
- Northwest Chef: Maria Hines, Tilth, Seattle, WA
- Pacific Chef: Douglas Keane, Cyrus, Healdsburg, CA
- Southeast Chef: Mike Lata, Fig, Charleston, SC
- Southwest Chef: Paul Bartolotta, Bartolotta Ristorante di Mare, Las Vegas, NV
- South Chef: John Currence, City Grocery, Oxford, MS
- Restaurant Design: The Design Bureaux, Inc., The Publican, Chicago, IL
- Restaurant Graphics: Korn Design, The Corner Office, Denver, CO

=== Book Awards ===
Sources:

- Cookbook of the year: Fat: An Appreciation of a Misunderstood Ingredient, with Recipes by Jennifer McLagan
- American Cooking: Screen Doors and Sweet Tea: Recipes and Tales from a Southern Cook by Martha Hall Foose
- Baking and Dessert: Bakewise: The Hows and Whys of Successful Baking by Shirley O. Corriher
- Beverage: WineWise: Your Complete Guide to Understanding, Selecting, and Enjoying Wine by Steven Kolpan, Brian H. Smith, and Michael A. Weiss, The Culinary Institute of America
- Cooking from a Professional Point of View: Alinea by Grant Achatz
- General Cooking: How to Cook Everything (Completely Revised Tenth Anniversary Edition) by Mark Bittman
- Focus on Health: The Food You Crave: Luscious Recipes for a Healthy Life by Ellie Krieger
- International: Beyond the Great Wall: Recipes and Travels in the Other China by Jeffrey Alford and Naomi Duguid
- Photography: The Big Fat Duck Cookbook by Dominic Davies
- Reference and Scholarship: The Flavor Bible: The Essential Guide to Culinary Creativity, Based on the Wisdom of America's Most Imaginative Chefs by Karen Page and Andrew Dornenburg
- Single Subject: Fat: An Appreciation of a Misunderstood Ingredient, with Recipes by Jennifer McLagan
- Writing and Literature: In Defense of Food by Michael Pollan
- Cookbook Hall of Fame: Jane Grigson for her entire body of work, including: The Art of Charcuterie, Good Things, Jane Grigson's Vegetable Book, The Mushroom Feast, and English Food

=== Journalism Awards ===
Sources:

- MFK Fisher Distinguished Writing Award: Aleksandra Crapanzano, Gourmet, "Benedictions"
- Multimedia Writing on Food: Ruth Reichl, Gourmet.com, "The Test Kitchen"
- Website Focusing on Food, Beverage, Restaurant, or Nutrition: Epicurious.com, Tanya Steel
- Food Related Columns: Corby Kummer, The Atlantic, "A Papaya Grows in Holyoke"; "Beyond the McIntosh"; "Half a Loaf"
- Reporting on Nutrition or Consumer Issues: Rachael Moeller Gorman, EatingWell, "How to Feed Your Mind"
- Restaurant Reviews: Adam Platt, New York Magazine, "Faux French"; "The Mario of Midtown"; "Corton on Hudson"
- Newspaper Feature Writing With Recipes: Rebekah Denn, Seattle Post-Intelligencer, "High on the Hairy Hogs: SuperSucculent Imports are Everything U.S. Pork Isn't"
- Newspaper Feature Writing Without Recipes: Kristen Hinman, Riverfront Times, "The Pope of Pork"
- Writing on Spirits, Wine, or Beer: Alan Richman, GQ, "Viva La Revolucion!"
- Magazine Feature Writing About Restaurants and/or Chefs: Ruth Reichl, Gourmet, "The Last Time I Saw Paris..."
- Magazine Feature Writing With Recipes: Edna Lewis, Gourmet, "What is Southern?" (posthumous)
- Magazine Feature Writing Without Recipes: Alan Richman, GQ, "Made (Better) in Japan"
- Newspaper Feature Writing About Restaurants and/or Chefs: Katy McLaughlin, The Wall Street Journal, "Sushi Bullies"
- Newspaper Food Section: The Washington Post, Joe Yonan
- Blog Focusing on Food, Beverage, Restaurant, or Nutrition: Erika Ehmsen, Elizabeth Jardina, Rick LaFrentz, Amy Machnak, Johanna Silver, Margaret Sloan, Margo True, Our One-Block Diet, Oneblockdiet.sunset.com

=== Broadcast Media Awards ===
Sources:

- Best Television Food Segment: "CBS News Sunday Morning: In a Pinch," Martha Teichner, CBS
- Best Television Food Show: "Lidia's Italy: Sweet Napoli," Lidia Matticchio Bastianich," PBS
- Best Audio Webcast or Radio Food Show: "The Leonard Lopate Show: 3-Ingredient Challenge," Leonard Lopate and Rozanne Gold, WNYC
- Best Video Webcast: "Savoring the Best of World Flavors, Volume III: Vietnam and the Island of Sicily," Jonathan Coleman, ciaprochef.com
