= Julia Erickson =

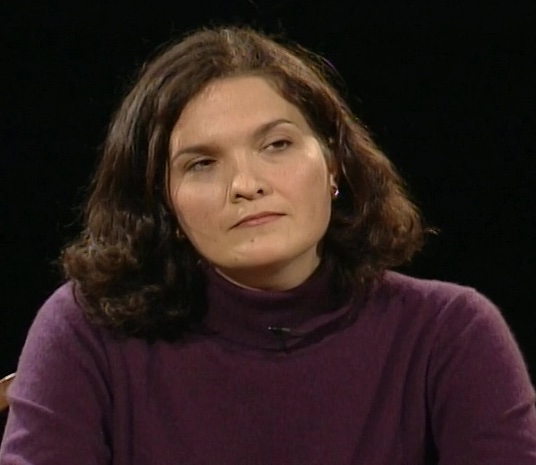
Erickson on CUNY TV's Urban Agenda (1999)

Julia Erickson is an American non-profit director and career coach.

== Life and career ==
Erickson was born and raised in New Jersey. Her father worked as a Lutheran minister. She graduated from Smith College in 1980 and afterwards worked for the Community Service Society of New York and then for the Department of Employment for New York City. She later graduated from the Columbia University's Institute of Nonprofit Management.

Between 1994 and 2005, Erickson was the Executive Director of City Harvest (an emergency food program in New York City), during which time the budget of the non-profit increased by five times. After her work in New York City, Erickson became a career coach and author, running the company My Right Fit Job.

== Recognition ==
In 2003 Erickson received the James Beard Foundation Award.
