= Laura Schenone =

American writer

Laura Schenone is an American writer. She is the author of three books and the recipient of the James Beard Award, which recognizes excellence in food writers and culinary professionals.

== Early life ==
Schenone was born in New Jersey, and grew mainly up in Hackensack, New Jersey. She has degrees from Rutgers University and the City College of New York. From a young age she was interested in food and literature.

== Writing ==
Schenone started out her career as an editor and freelance journalist publishing in the Washington Post, The New York Times, and Saveur.

Schenone’s first book was A Thousand Years Over a Hot Stove: A History of American Women Told Through Food, Recipes, and Remembrances, (W.W. Norton 2004). This book won the James Beard Book Award The book contains classic recipes and tells the story of women’s history through food, from native women who fought the elements to feed their families, to moms who sold cookies to buy their children’s freedom, to immigrant women who cooked old foods in new homes.

Schenone's second book was The Lost Ravioli Recipes of Hoboken: A Search for Food and Family about traveling to her family's ancestral region of Genoa on a quest to understand the mysteries of family, and the lost art of hand-rolled pasta.

Schenone's third book was The Dogs of Avalon: The Race to Save Animals in Peril which is the story of Marion Fitzgibbon, an Irish woman and her odyssey to help abused, neglected, and abandoned animals, especially those abused by the Irish greyhound racing industry. Schenone learns of Fitzgibbon when she adopts Lily, an Irish greyhound, for her son who "needed a dog." The book expands to tell the story of people who fight for all animals around the globe and asks the question of whether or not "All living creatures have a right to live and die with dignity."

== Selected publications ==
- Schenone, Laura (2004). A Thousand Years Over a Hot Stove: A History of American Women Told Through Food, Recipes, and Remembrances. W.W. Norton.
- Schenone, Laura (2008). The Lost Ravioli Recipes of Hoboken: A Search for Food and FamilyThe Lost Ravioli Recipes of Hoboken: A Search for Food and Family. W.W. Norton.
- Schenone, Laura (2017). The Dogs of Avalon: The Race to Save Animals in Peril. W.W. Norton.
