= James Beard Foundation Award: 1990s =

The James Beard Foundation Awards are annual awards presented by the James Beard Foundation to recognize culinary professionals in the United States. The awards recognize chefs, restaurateurs, authors and journalists each year, and are generally scheduled around James Beard's May birthday.

The foundation also awards annually since 1998 the designation of America's Classic for local independently owned restaurants that reflect the character of the community.

== 1991 awards ==
The first James Beard Foundation Awards were presented on May 6, 1991, aboard the luxury liner M/S New Yorker, in a ceremony hosted by George Plimpton.

=== Restaurant and Chef Awards ===
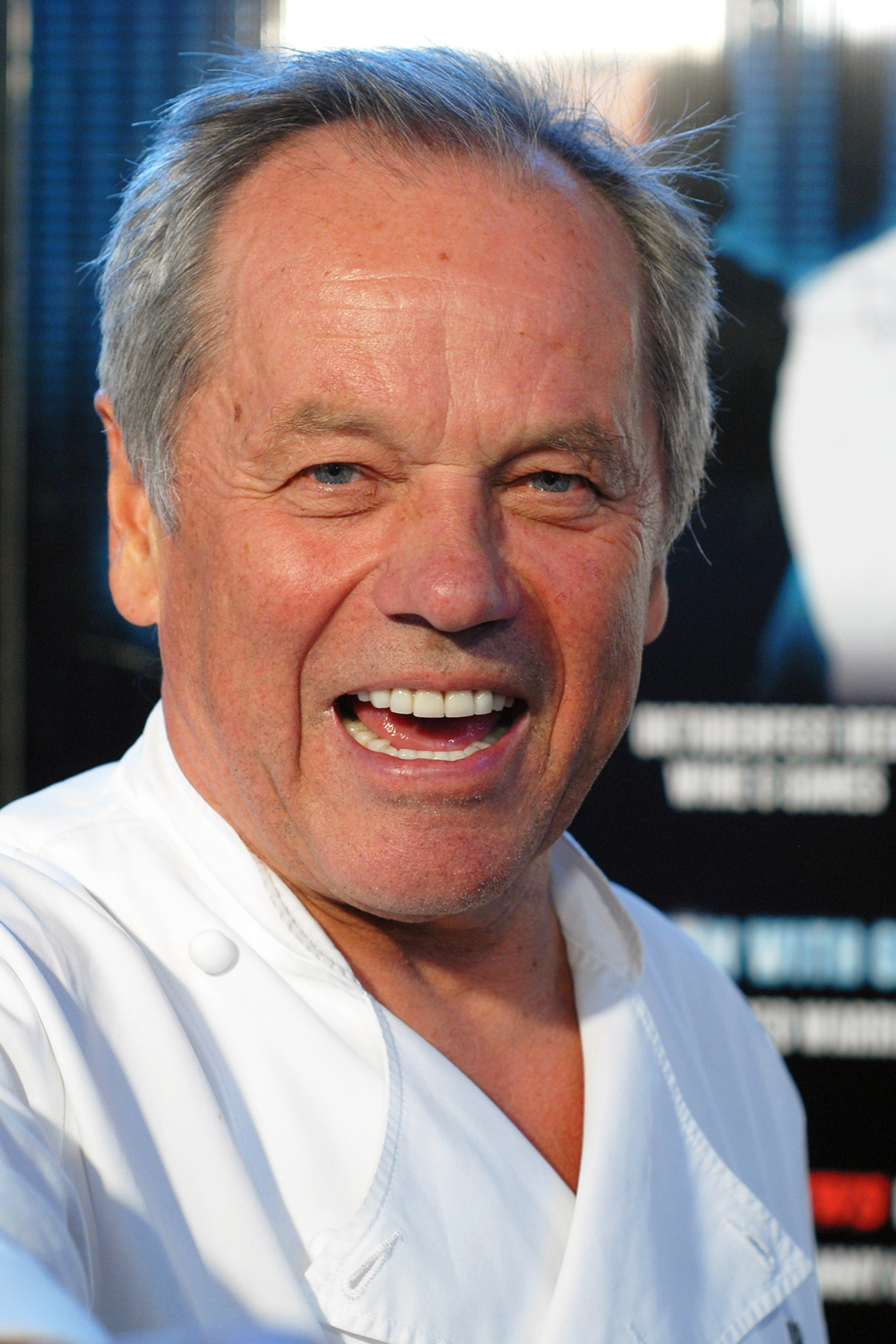
Wolfgang Puck

- Outstanding Chef: Wolfgang Puck, Spago; West Hollywood, CA
- Lifetime Achievement Award: M.F.K. Fisher
- Humanitarian of the Year: Bill Shore, Share Our Strength; Washington, DC
- Outstanding Restaurant: Bouley; New York, NY
- Rising Star Chef: Todd English, Olives; Cambridge, MA
- Outstanding Pastry Chef: Nancy Silverton, Campanile; Los Angeles, CA
- Outstanding Wine & Spirits Professional: Robert Mondavi, Robert Mondavi Winery; Oakville, CA
- Outstanding Wine Service: Square One; San Francisco, CA
- Best Chef: California: Joachim Splichal, Patina; Los Angeles, CA
- Best Chef: Mid-Atlantic: Jean-Louis Palladin, Jean-Louis at the Watergate Hotel; Washington, D.C.
- Best Chef: Midwest: Rick Bayless, Topolobampo; Chicago, IL
- Best Chef: Northeast: Jasper White, Jasper's; Boston, MA
- Best Chef: Northwest:Caprial Pence, Fuller's; Seattle, WA
- Best Chef: Southeast: Emeril Lagasse, Emeril's; New Orleans, LA
- Best Chef: Southwest: Stephan Pyles, Routh Street Café; Dallas, TX

=== Book Awards ===
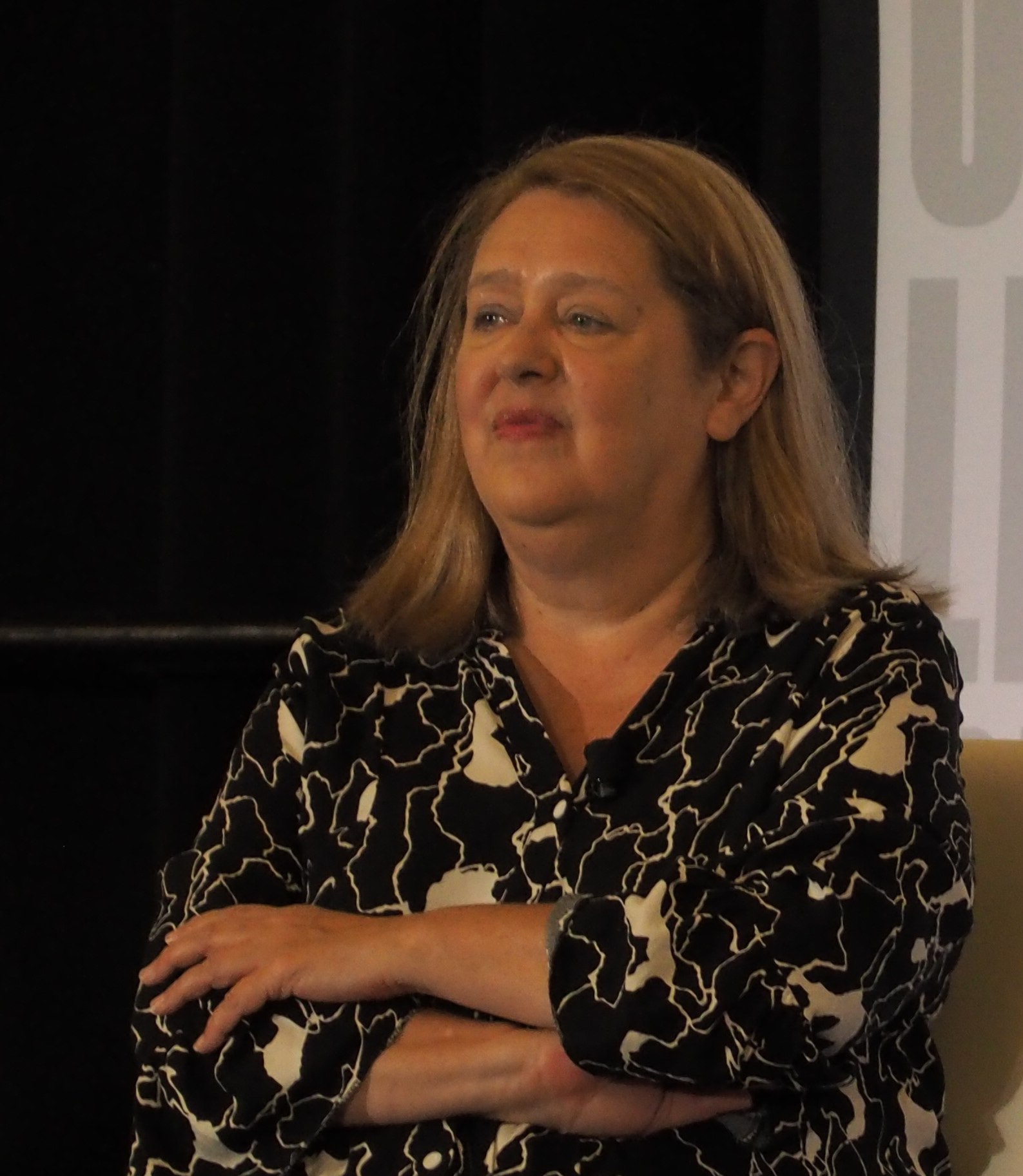
Anya von Bremzen

- Cookbook Hall of Fame: The Food of France and The Food of Italy by Waverley Root
- Cookbook of the Year: Cocolat: Extraordinary Chocolate Desserts by Alice Medrich
- American Regional: Lee Bailey's Southern Food and Plantation Houses by Lee Bailey
- Americana: America the Beautiful Cookbook by Phillip Stephen Schulz
- Baking & Desserts: Rose's Christmas Cookies by Rose Levy Beranbaum
- Best Food Photography Cocolat: Extraordinary Chocolate Desserts, photographer Patricia Brabant
- Every Day Cooking: The Short-Cut Cook by Jacques Pépin
- Fruits, Vegetables & Grains: Pasta: Creating, Celebrating and Saucing by Constance Jones
- Health and Diet: The Art of Low-Calorie Cooking by Sally Schneider
- International: Please to the Table: The Russia Cookbook by Anya von Bremzen
- Single Subject: Susan Costner's Great Sandwiches by Susan Costner
- Special Occasions: Dinner Party by Jane Freiman
- Techniques: The Thrill of the Grill: Techniques, Recipes & Down-Home Barbecue by John Doc Willoughby and Christopher Schlesinger
- Wine & Spirits: The Wine Atlas of Italy: A Traveler's Guide to the Vineyards by Burton Anderson
- Writings on Food: Epicurian Delight: The Life & Times of James Beard by Evan Jones

== 1992 awards ==
The second annual James Beard Awards were presented on May 4, 1992, at New York's Lincoln Center, hosted by Phyllis George.

=== Restaurant and Chef Awards ===
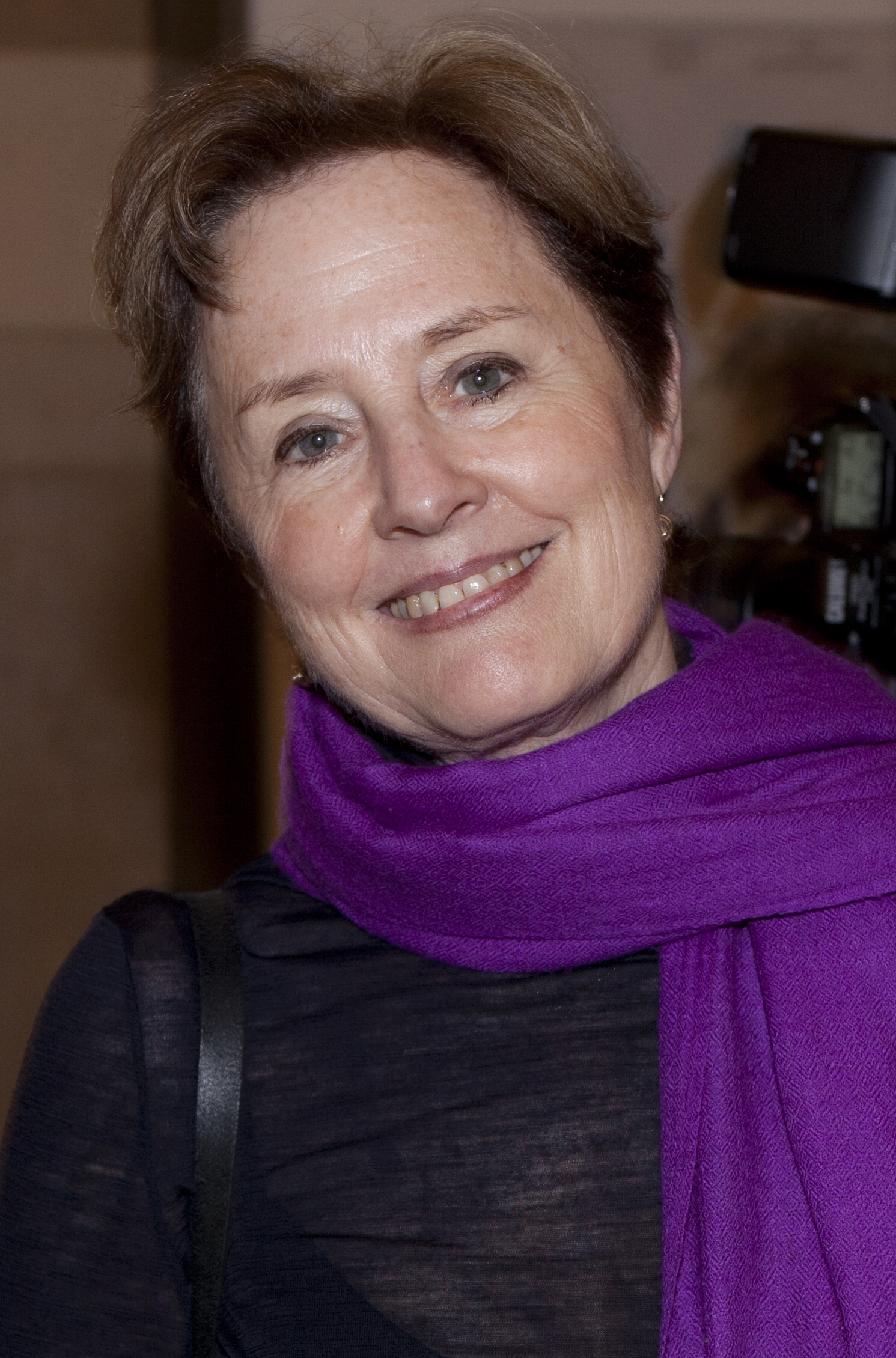
Alice Waters

- Outstanding Chef: Alice Waters, Chez Panisse; Berkeley, CA
- Lifetime Achievement Award: Craig Claiborne
- Humanitarian of the Year: Gael Greene, Citymeals-on-Wheels; New York, NY
- Outstanding Restaurant: Chez Panisse; Berkeley, CA
- Rising Star Chef: Debra Ponzek, Montrachet; New York, NY
- Outstanding Pastry Chef: Albert Kumin, Vie de Frances International Pastry Arts Center; Elmsford, NY
- Outstanding Service: Union Square Cafe, New York, NY
- Outstanding Wine & Spirits Professional: André Tchelistcheff, Napa, CA
- Outstanding Wine Service: Bern's Steak House; Tampa, FL
- Best Chef: California & Hawaii: Michel Richard, Citrus; Los Angeles, CA
- Best Chef: Mid-Atlantic: Patrick O'Connell, Inn at Little Washington; Washington, VA
- Best Chef: Midwest: Charlie Trotter, Charlie Trotter's; Chicago, IL
- Best Chef: New York City: Daniel Boulud, Le Cirque; New York, NY
- Best Chef: Northeast: Lydia Shire, Biba; Boston, MA
- Best Chef: Northwest: Barbara Figueroa, The Hunt Club; Seattle, WA
- Best Chef: Southeast: Mark Militello, Mark's Place; N. Miami, FL
- Best Chef: Southwest: Robert Del Grande, Café Annie; Houston, TX

=== Book Awards ===
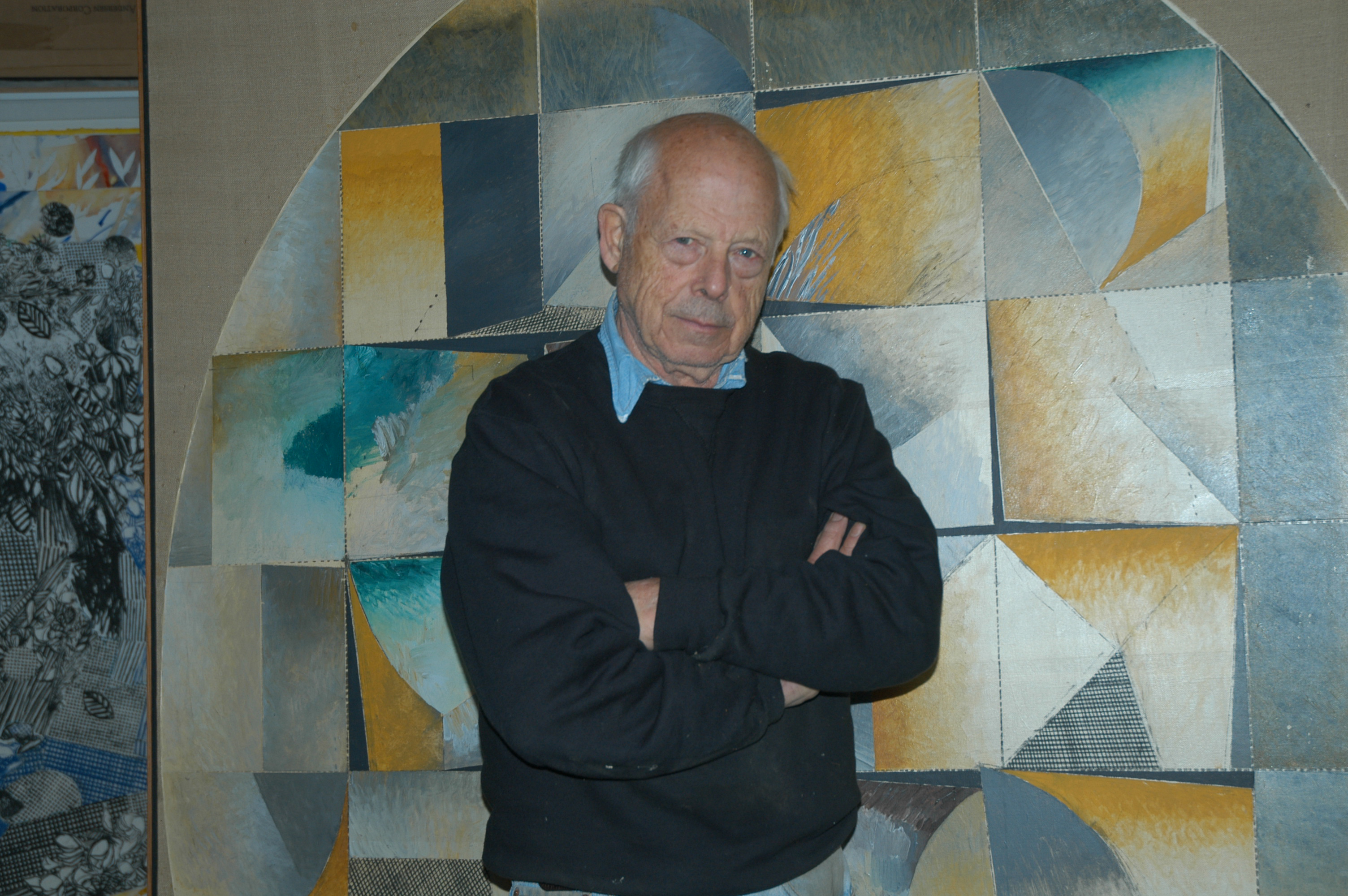
Edward Giobbi

- Cookbook Hall of Fame: The Silver Palate Cookbook by Julee Rosso and Sheila Lukins
- Cookbook of the Year: Sauces: Classical and Contemporary Sauce Making by James Peterson
- Americana: Spirit of the Harvest: North American Indian Cooking by Beverly Cox and Martin Jacobs
- Baking & Desserts: Great Cakes by Carole Walter
- Best Food Photography: A Vineyard Garden, photographer Molly Chappellet
- Convenience: From Pantry to Table by Marlena Spieler
- General: Pleasures of the Good Earth by Edward Giobbi
- Healthier Living: Chez Eddy Living Heart Cookbook by Antonio M. Gotto Jr, MD
- International: Simply French: Patricia Wells Presents the Cuisine of Joel Robuchon by Patricia Wells
- Italian: The Harry's Bar Cookbook: Recipes and Reminiscences from the World Famous Venice Bar and Restaurant by Arrigo Cipriani
- Single Subject: Sauces: Classical and Contemporary Sauce Making by James Peterson
- Special Occasions: New Home Cooking by Florence Fabricant
- Wine & Spirits: Oz Clark's New Classic Wines by Oz Clarke
- Writings on Food: Food and Friends by Simone Beck and Suzanne Patterson

== 1993 awards ==
The third annual James Beard Awards were presented on May 3, 1993, at the New York Marriott Marquis, and journalism awards were presented for the first time.

=== Restaurant and Chef Awards ===
- Outstanding Chef: (tie) Larry Forgione, An American Place; New York, NY & Jean-Louis Palladin, Jean-Louis at the Watergate Hotel; Washington, DC
- Lifetime Achievement Award: André Soltner
- Humanitarian of the Year: Ben Cohen and Jerry Greenfield, Ben & Jerry's; Waterbury, VT
- Outstanding Restaurant: The Inn at Little Washington; Washington, VA
- Outstanding Pastry Chef: Lindsey Shere, Chez Panisse; Berkeley, CA
- Rising Star Chef: Bobby Flay, Mesa Grill; New York, NY
- Outstanding Service: Commander's Palace; New Orleans, LA
- Outstanding Wine & Spirits Professional: Kevin Zraly, Windows on the World; New York, NY
- Outstanding Wine Service: Charlie Trotter's; Chicago, IL
- Best Chef: California: (TIE) Bradley Ogden, Lark Creek Inn; Larkspur, CA AND Jeremiah Tower, Stars, San Francisco, CA
- Best Chef: Mid-Atlantic: Marcel Desaulniers, The Trellis; Williamsburg, VA
- Best Chef: Midwest: Jimmy Schmidt, The Rattlesnake Club; Detroit, MI
- Best Chef: New York City: Alfred Portale, Gotham Bar & Grill; New York, NY
- Best Chef: Northeast: Johanne Killeen and George Germon, Al Forno; Providence, RI
- Best Chef: Pacific Northwest: Roy Yamaguchi, Roy's; Honolulu, HI
- Best Chef: Southeast: Susan Spicer, Bayona; New Orleans, LA
- Best Chef: Southwest: Vincent Guerithault, Vincent's on Camelback; Phoenix, AZ

=== Book Awards ===
- Cookbook Hall of Fame: Simple French Food by Marian Burros and Richard Olney
- Cookbook of the Year: The Splendid Table: Recipes from Emilia Romagna, The Heartland of Northern Italian Food by Lynne Rossetto Kasper
- Americana: New York Cookbook by Molly O'Neill
- Baking & Desserts: Death by Chocolate: The Last Word on a Consuming Passion by Marcel Desaulniers
- Best Food Photography: France: A Culinary Journey, photographer Peter Johnson
- Entertaining & Special Occasions: Alfresco by Linda Burgess and Rosamond Richardson
- Fruits, Vegetables & Grains: Quick Vegetarian Pleasures by Jeanne Lemlin
- General: Back to Square One: Old-World Food in a New-World Kitchen by Joyce Goldstein
- International: Yamuna's Table by Yamuna Devi
- Italian: Essentials of Classic Italian Cooking by Marcella Hazan
- Light & Healthy: Steven Raichlen's High Flavor, Low-Fat Cooking by Steven Raichlen
- Quick & Easy: Great Food Without Fuss by Fran McCullough and Barbara Witt
- Single Subject: Preserving Today by Jeanne Lesem
- Wine & Spirits: The Vintner's Art: How Great Wines are Made by Hugh Johnson and James Halliday
- Writings on Food: Peppers: A Story of Hot Pursuits by Amal Naj

=== Journalism Awards ===
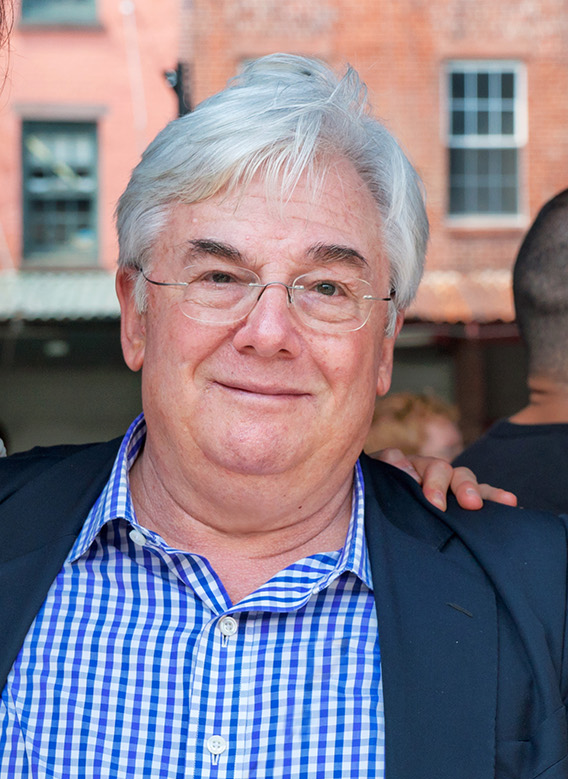
Jeffrey Steingarten

- Features/Consumer Information: Ginger Munsch Crichton, Leslie Barker, and Rita Rubin, "Eating and Aging", Dallas Morning News
- Literary Writing About Food, Wine & Spirits: Jeffrey Steingarten, "Simply Red", Vogue
- News/Investigative Reporting: Trudy Lieberman, "Is Our Fish Fit to Eat", Consumer Reports
- Restaurant Review/Critique: Alan Richman, GQ

== 1994 awards ==
The 1994 James Beard Awards were presented on May 2, 1994, at the New York Marriott Marquis, televised live for the first time on the Food Network. Four new electronic media awards were given this year.

=== Restaurant and Chef Awards ===
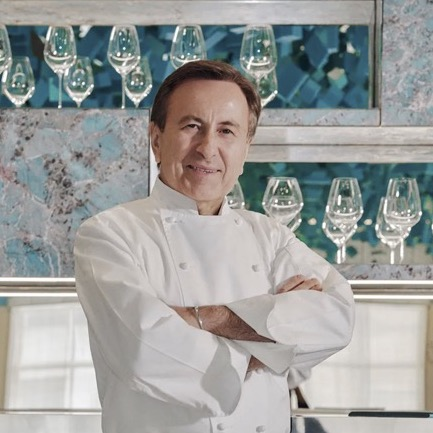
Daniel Boulud

Sources:

- Outstanding Chef: Daniel Boulud, Daniel; New York, NY
- Lifetime Achievement Award: Robert Mondavi; Napa, CA
- Humanitarian of the Year: Wolfgang Puck and Barbara Lazaroff, Spago; Beverly Hills, CA
- Outstanding Restaurant: Spago; West Hollywood, CA
- Outstanding Pastry Chef: Jacques Torres, Le Cirque; New York, NY
- Rising Star Chef: Sarah Stegner, The Ritz-Carlton; Chicago, IL
- Outstanding Service: Rainbow Room; New York, NY
- Outstanding Wine & Spirits Professional: Randall Grahm, Bonny Doon Vineyard; Santa Cruz, CA
- Outstanding Wine Service: Valentino; Santa Monica, CA
- Best Chef: California: Joyce Goldstein, Square One; San Francisco, CA
- Best Chef: Mid-Atlantic: Patrick Clark, The Hay-Adams Hotel; Washington, DC
- Best Chef: Midwest: Paul Bartolotta, Spiaggia; Chicago, IL
- Best Chef: New York City: David Bouley, Bouley; New York, NY
- Best Chef: Northeast: Todd English, Olives; Charlestown, MA
- Best Chef: Pacific Northwest: (TIE) Tom Douglas, Dahlia Lounge; Seattle, WA AND Monique Barbeau, Fullers; Seattle, WA
- Best Chef: Southeast: Allen Susser, Chef Allen's; North Miami Beach, FL
- Best Chef: Southwest: Dean Fearing, Mansion on Turtle Creek; Dallas, TX

=== Book Awards ===
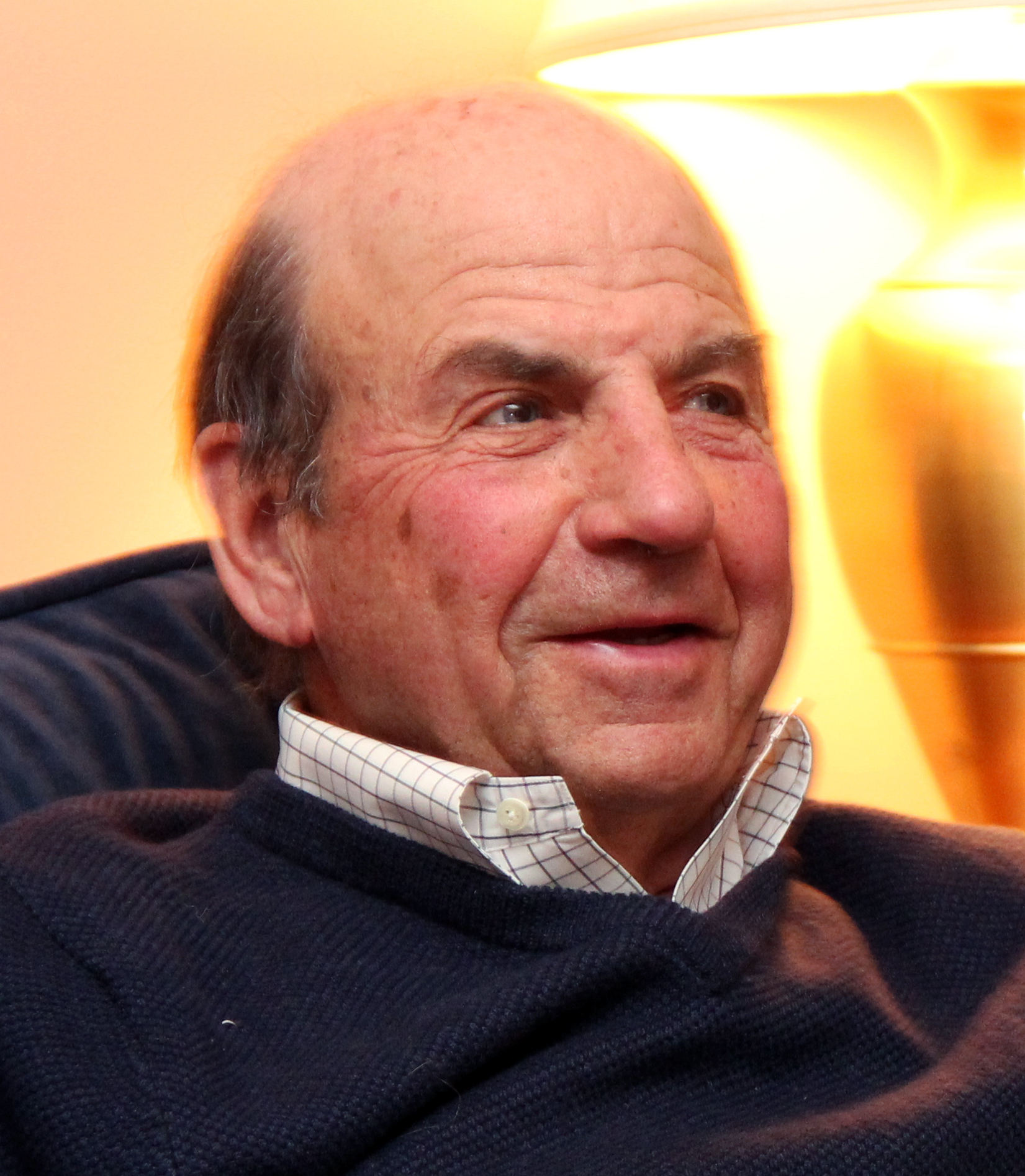
Calvin Trillin

Sources:

- Cookbook Hall of Fame: Alice Let's Eat, American Fried and Third Helpings by Calvin Trillin
- Cookbook of the Year: Madhur Jaffrey's A Taste of the Far East by Madhur Jaffrey
- Americana: Nathalie Dupree's Southern Memories by Nathalie Dupree
- Baking & Desserts: Secrets of a Jewish Baker: Authentic Jewish Rye and Other Breads by George Greenstein
- Best Food Photography: Lemons: A Country Garden Cookbook, photographer Kathryn Kleinman
- Convenience: Dinner in Minutes: Memorable Meals for Busy Cooks by Linda Gassenheimer
- Entertaining & Special Occasions: Celebrations by Joe Famularo
- Fruits, Vegetables & Grains: Faye Levy's International Vegetable Cookbook by Faye Levy
- General: Little Meals by Rozanne Gold
- Healthy Focus: The Joslin Diabetes Gourmet Cookbook by Bonnie Sanders Polin and Frances Towner Giedt
- International: Madhur Jaffrey's A Taste of the Far East by Madhur Jaffrey
- Italian: Italy in Small Bites by Carol Field
- References & Resources: Recipes Into Type by Dolores Simon and Joan Whitman
- Single Subject: A Seafood Celebration by Sheryl and Mel London
- Wine & Spirits: Wine Atlas of California by James Halliday
- Writings on Food: Home on the Range: A Culinary History of the American West by Cathy Luchetti

=== Electronic Media Awards ===
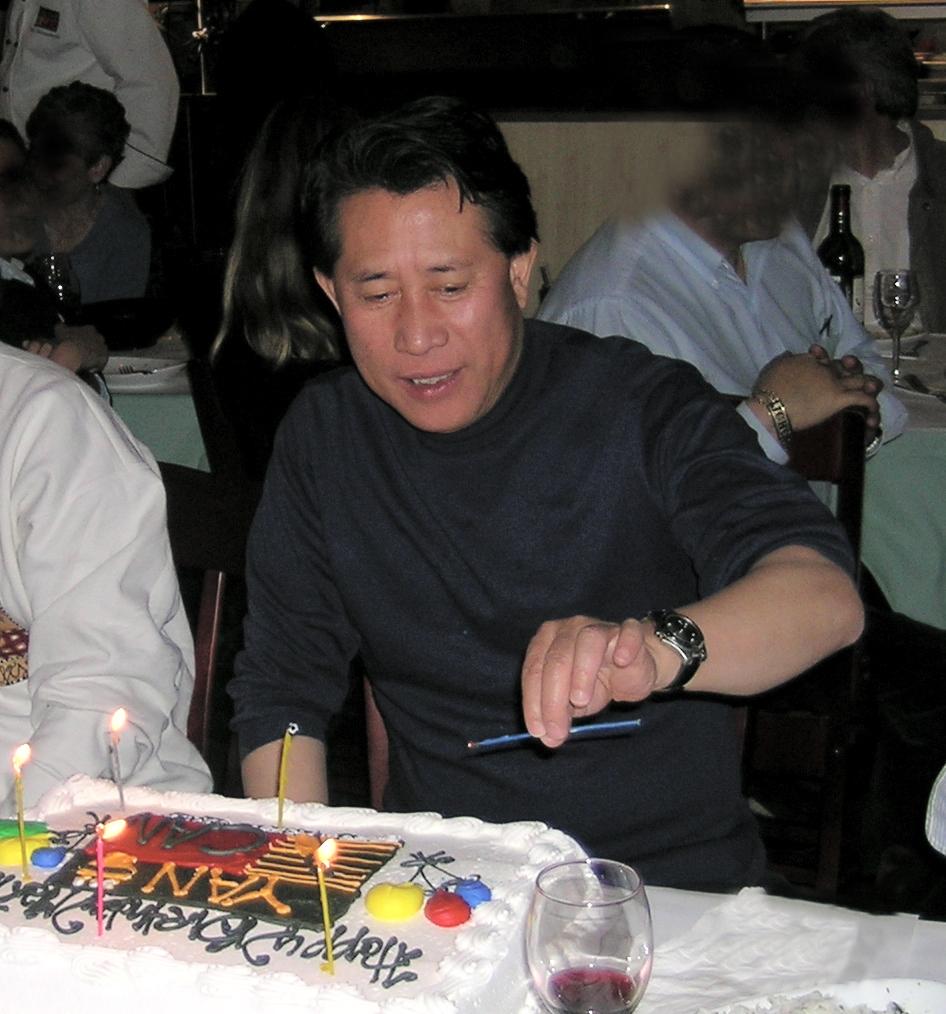
Martin Yan

- Best Culinary Video: Today's Gourmet with Jacques Pepin, host: Jacques Pepin, producers: Peter Stein and Peggy Scott
- Best Radio Show on Food: California Foods, host: Diane Worthington; KABC
- Best Television Cooking Show: Yan Can Cook, host: Martin Yan; PBS
- Best Television Food Journalism: Burt Wolf's Table, journalist: Burt Wolf; WKNO-TV

=== Journalism Awards ===
- M.F.K. Fisher Distinguished Writing: Margo True, "Backstage at Café Annie", Houston Metropolitan
- Magazine Feature Reporting: Linda Beaulieu, "Native American", The National Culinary Review
- Magazine Restaurant Review or Critique: Alan Richman, GQ
- Magazine Series: Jeffrey Steingarten, Vogue
- Magazine Writing on Diet, Nutrition & Health: Maureen Callahan, "Diets Don't Work", Cooking Light
- Newspaper Feature Reporting: Ruth Reichl, "Seafood Seminar: A Day at the Markets", Los Angeles Times
- Newspaper News Reporting: Merle Alexander, "Test Tube Food", The Oregonian
- Newspaper Restaurant Review or Critique: Penelope Corcoran, The Arizona Republic
- Newspaper Series: Eleanor Ostman and Ellen Carlson, St. Paul Pioneer Press
- Newspaper Writing on Diet, Nutrition & Health: Karin A. Welzel, "Salt Shakes Loose", The Columbus Dispatch

== 1995 awards ==
The 1995 James Beard Awards were presented on May 10, 1995, at the New York Marriott Marquis, in a televised ceremony hosted by Robin Leach and Donna Hanover.

=== Who's Who ===
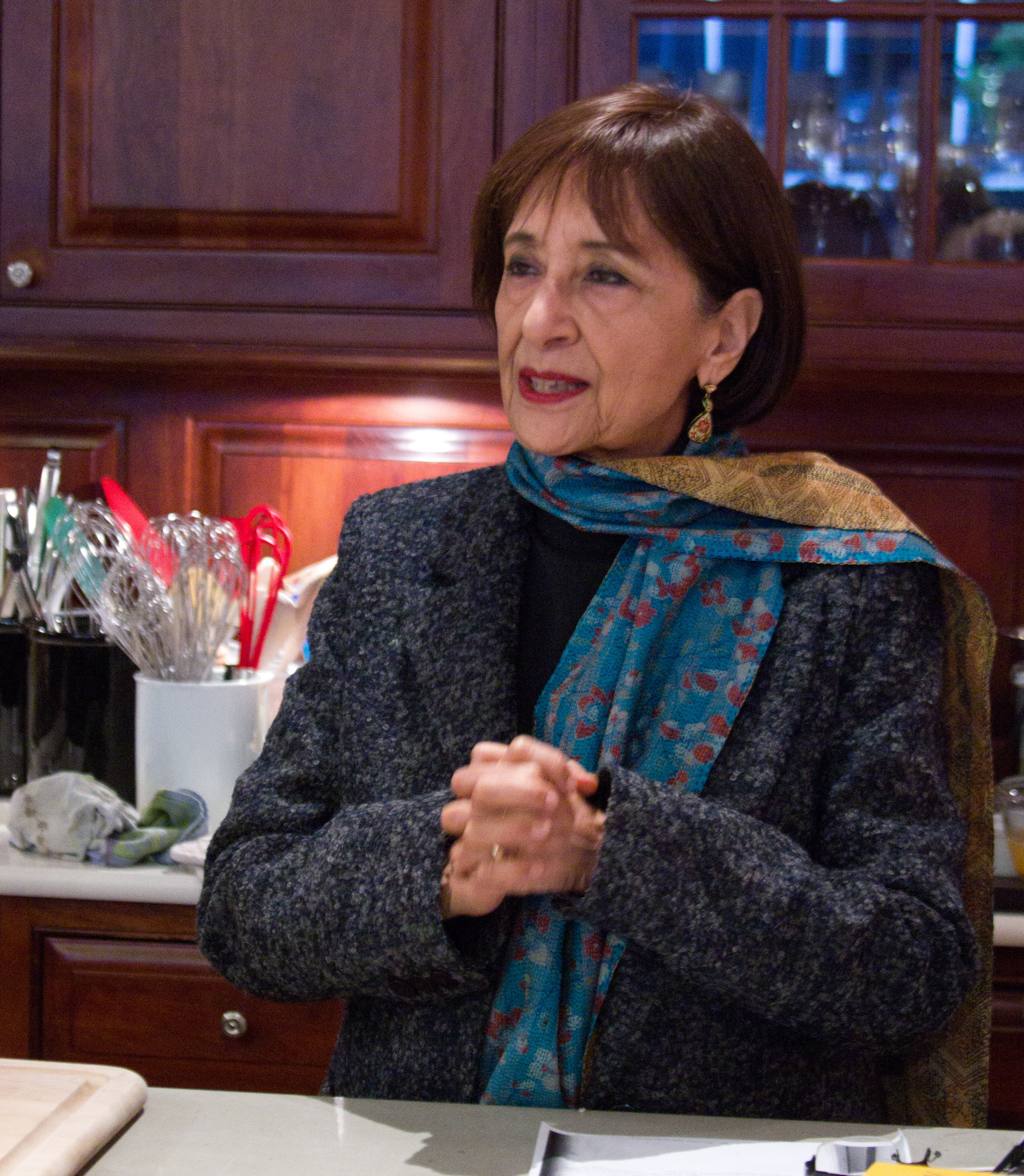
Madhur Jaffrey

- Who's Who of Food & Beverage in America: New York, New York: Madhur Jaffrey

=== Restaurant and Chef Awards ===
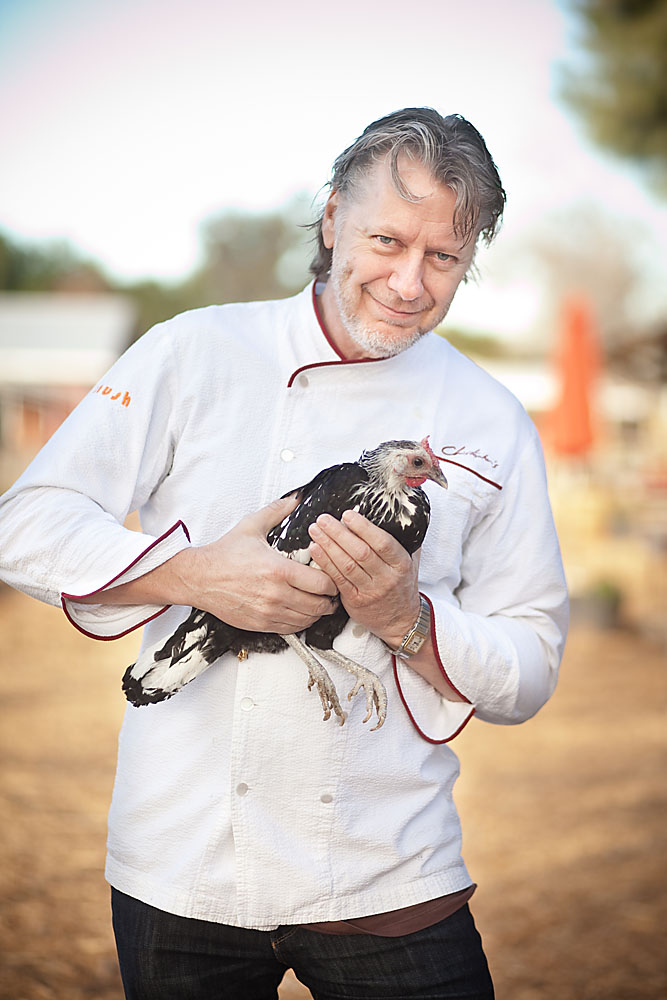
Christopher Gross

- Outstanding Chef: Rick Bayless, Frontera Grill and Topolobampo; Chicago, IL
- Lifetime Achievement Award: Chuck Williams; San Francisco, CA
- Humanitarian of the Year: Paul Newman, A.E. Hotchner, and Ursula Hotchner, Newman's Own; Westport, CT
- Outstanding Restaurant: Le Cirque; New York, NY
- Best New Restaurant: Nobu; New York, NY
- Rising Star Chef: Traci Des Jardins, Rubicon; San Francisco, CA
- Outstanding Pastry Chef: Francois Payard, Daniel; New York, NY
- Outstanding Service: Montrachet; New York, NY
- Outstanding Wine & Spirits Professional: Marvin Shanken, Wine Spectator Magazine; New York, NY
- Outstanding Wine Service: Montrachet; New York, NY
- Best Chef: California: Gary Danko, The Dining Room at the Ritz Carlton; San Francisco, CA
- Best Chef: Mid-Atlantic: Robert Kinkead, Kinkead's; Washington, DC
- Best Chef: Midwest: Jean Joho, Everest; Chicago, IL
- Best Chef: New York City: Gray Kunz, Lespinasse; New York, NY
- Best Chef: Northeast: Gordon Hamersley, Hamersley's Bistro; Boston, MA
- Best Chef: Northwest/Hawaii: Tamara Murphy, Campagne; Seattle, WA
- Best Chef: Southeast: Elizabeth Terry, Elizabeth's on 37th; Savannah, GA
- Best Chef: Southwest: Christopher Gross, Christopher and Christopher's Bistro; Phoenix, AZ
- Outstanding Restaurant Design: Chhada, Siembieda, & Partners, Ltd., Fifty Seven Fifty Seven Restaurant; New York, NY
- Outstanding Restaurant Graphics: Bow & Arrow Press, Gramercy Tavern; New York, NY

=== Book Awards ===
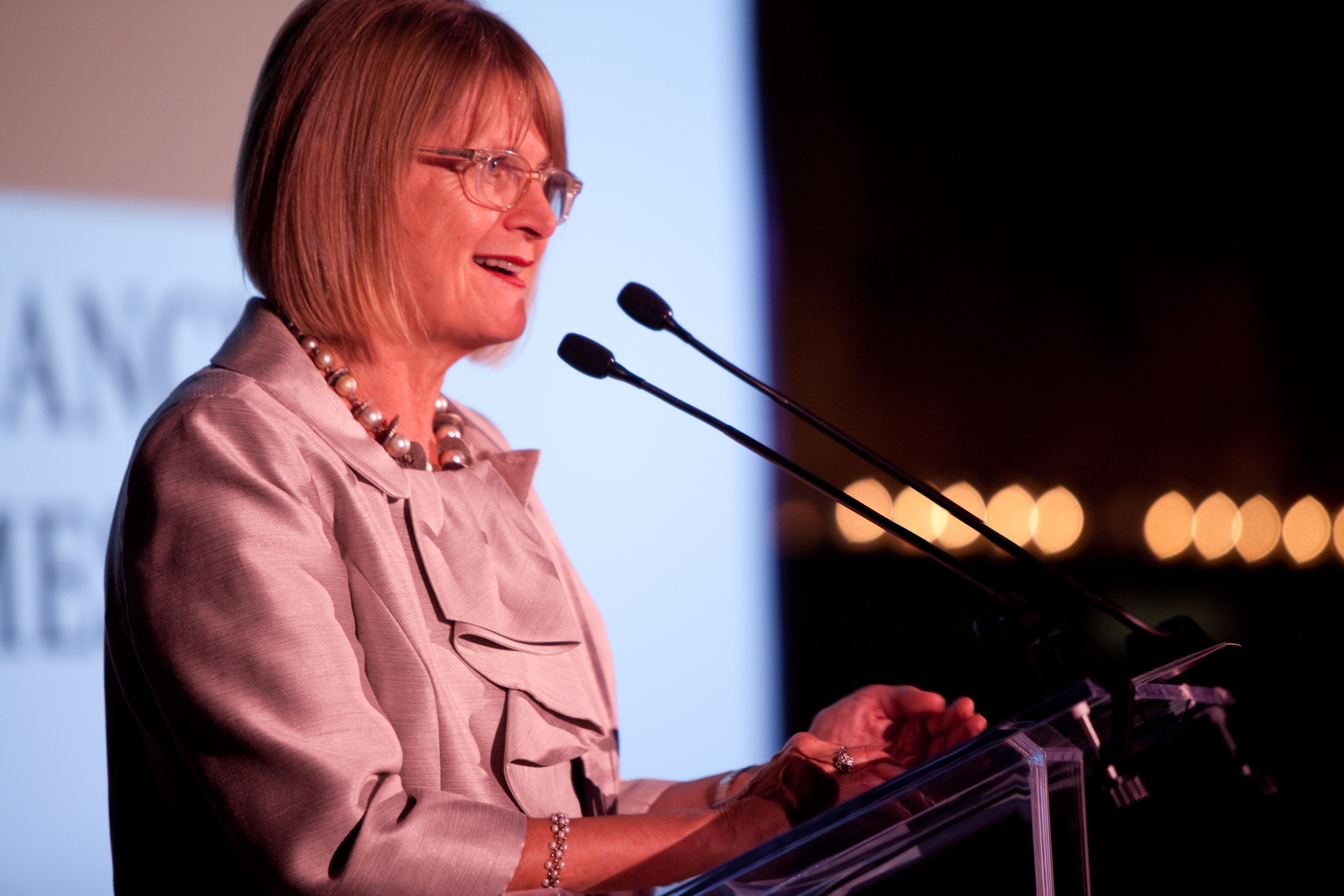
Jancis Robinson

- Cookbook Hall of Fame: Greene on Greens by Bert Greene
- Cookbook of the Year: Chocolate and the Art of Low-Fat Desserts by Alice Medrich
- Accent on Flavors: Smoke & Spice by Bill Jamison and Cheryl Alters Jamison
- Baking & Desserts: Classic Home Desserts by Richard Sax
- Entertaining & Special Occasions: Entertaining on the Run by Marlene Sorosky Gray
- Food of the Americas: Jewish Cooking in America by Joan Nathan
- Fruits, Vegetables & Grains: Onions, Onions, Onions by Linda and Fred Griffith
- General Interest: Now You're Cooking: Everything a Beginner Needs to Know to Start Cooking Today by Elaine Corn
- Healthy Focus: Chocolate and the Art of Low-Fat Desserts by Alice Medrich
- International: The Cooking the Eastern Mediterranean by Paula Wolfert
- Single Subject: The Burger Meisters by Marcel Desaulniers
- Technical & Reference: The Book of Food by Frances Bissell
- Vegetarian: Moosewood Restaurant Cooks at Home by The Moosewood Collective
- Wine & Spirits: The Oxford Companion to Wine by Jancis Robinson
- Writing on Food: Treasures of the Italian Table by Burton Anderson

=== Electronic Media Awards ===
- Best Culinary Video: Julia Child and Jacques Pepin, Cooking in Concert; hosts: Julia Child and Jacques Pepin, producer: Geoffrey Drummond
- Best Culinary Radio Show: California Foods, host: Diane Worthington; KABC
- Best Television Cooking Series: Pierre Franey's Cooking in France; host: Pierre Franey, producers: Charles Pinsky and John Potthast; Maryland Public Television
- Best Television Food Journalism: CNN Presents: Food to Die For; host: Carolyn O'Neil, producer: Stacy Jolna; CNN

=== Journalism Awards ===
- M.F.K. Fisher Distinguished Writing: Alison A. Cook, "Church of the Immaculate Barbecue/Tempting Tapas", Houston Press
- Magazine Feature with Recipes: Sally Schneider, "Truffles in Black and White", Saveur
- Magazine Feature without Recipes: Amanda Mayer Stinchecum, "Making Tea", Saveur
- Magazine Restaurant Review or Critique: Alan Richman, GQ
- Magazine Series: Elizabeth Schneider, "Vegetable Wise", Eating Well
- Magazine Writing on Diet, Nutrition & Health: Laura Shapiro, "The Skinny on Fat", Newsweek
- Newspaper Feature Writing with Recipes: Michelle Huneven, "Cooking in the Slow Lane", Los Angeles Times
- Newspaper Feature Writing without Recipes: Steven Pratt, "Feeding Frenzy", Chicago Tribune
- Newspaper News Reporting: Daniel P. Puzo, "Unsafe at any Meal?", Los Angeles Times
- Newspaper Restaurant Review or Critique: Alison A. Cook, Houston Press
- Newspaper Series: Elaine Louie, "Ethnic Eating in New York", The New York Times
- Newspaper Writing on Diet, Nutrition & Health: Carole Sugarman, "Can a Chef Scale Back? The Diet Diary of Roberto Donna", The Washington Post

== 1996 awards ==
The 1996 James Beard Awards were presented on April 29, 1996, at the New York Marriott Marquis. The Monday-night ceremony was hosted by Al Roker and Nina Griscom, while the cookbook and journalism awards were announced one night earlier at a dinner at the Yale Club of New York City.

=== Restaurant and Chef Awards ===
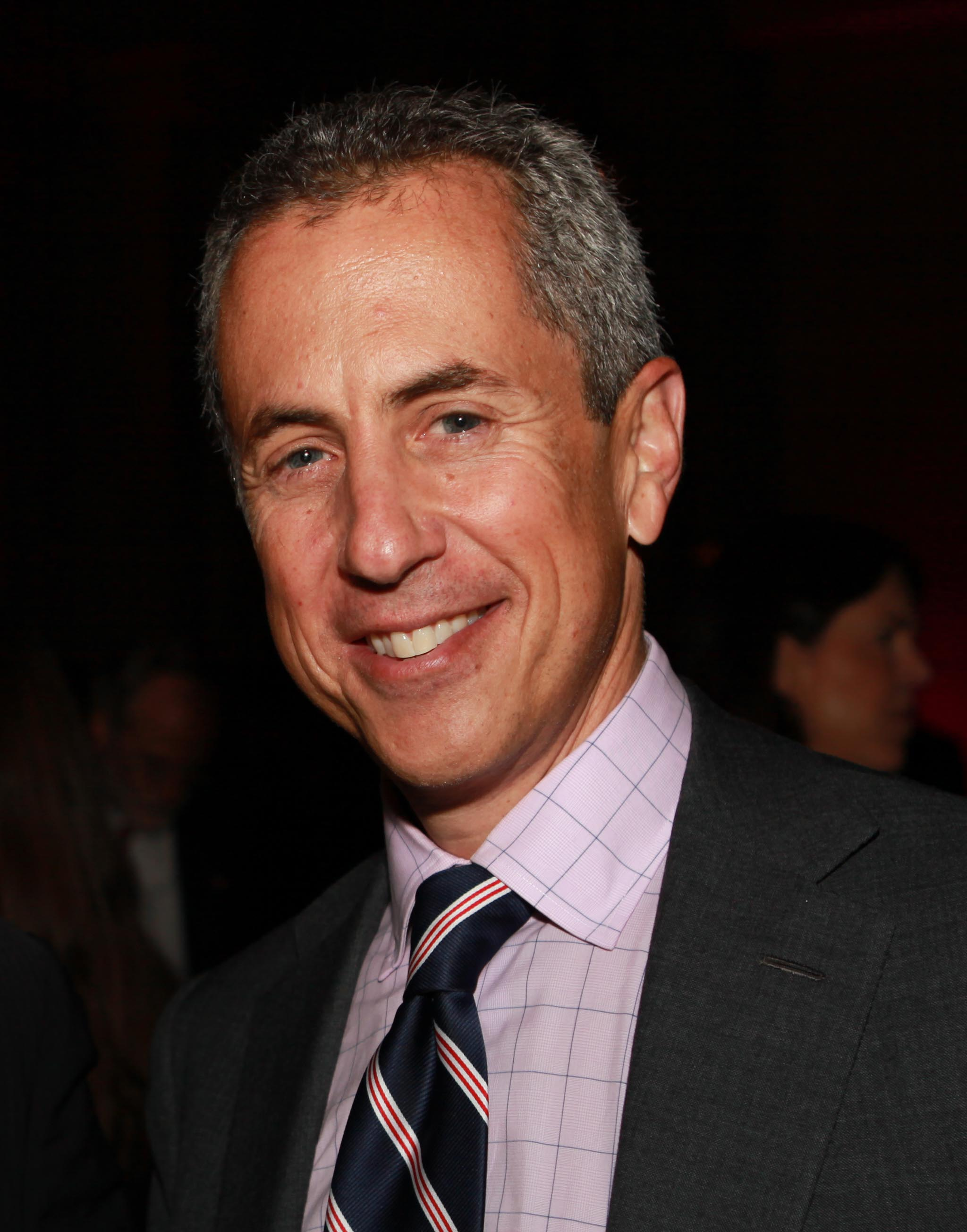
Danny Meyer

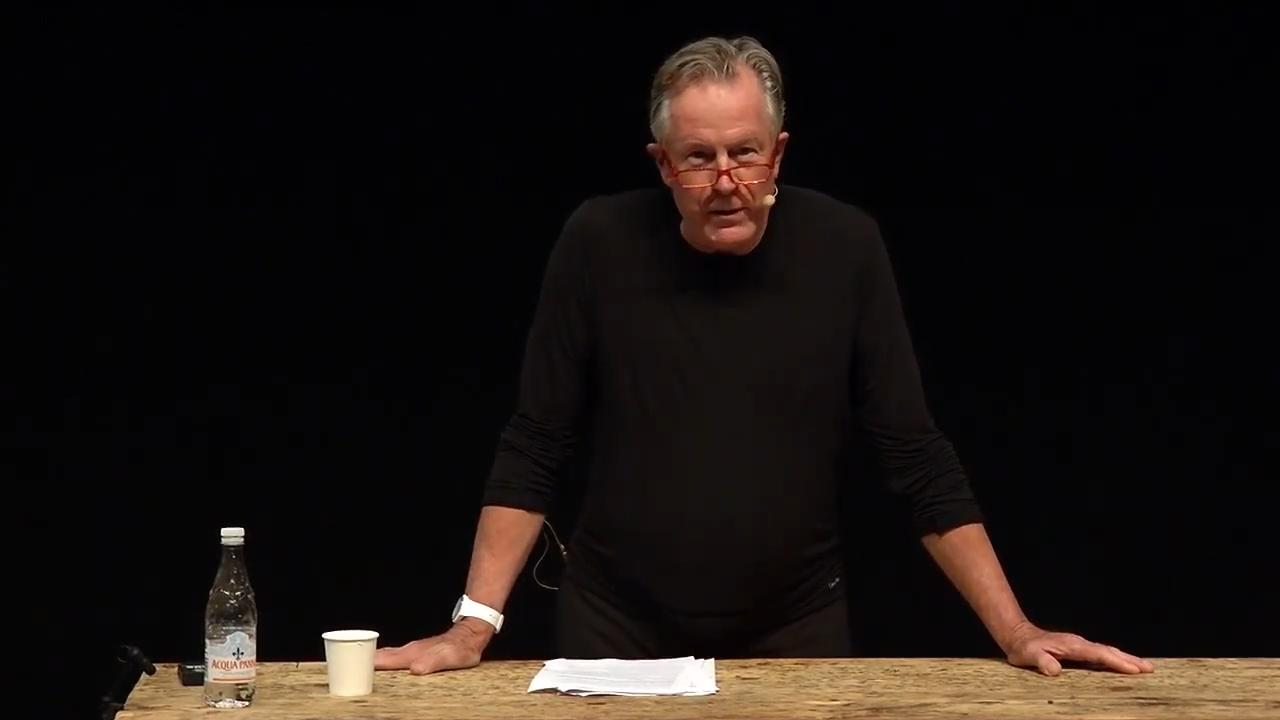
Jeremiah Tower

- Outstanding Chef: Jeremiah Tower, Stars; San Francisco, CA
- Lifetime Achievement Award: Peter Kump; New York, NY
- Humanitarian of the Year: Danny Meyer, New York, NY
- Outstanding Restaurant: Commander's Palace; New Orleans, LA
- Best New Restaurant: Brasserie Jo; Chicago, IL
- Rising Star Chef: Douglas Rodriguez, Patria; New York, NY
- Outstanding Pastry Chef: Sarabeth Levine, Sarabeth's; New York, NY
- Outstanding Service: Valentino; Santa Monica, CA
- Outstanding Wine & Spirits Professional: Jamie Davies and Jack Davies, Schramsberg Vineyards; Calistoga, CA
- Outstanding Wine Service: Chanterelle; New York, NY
- Best Chef: California: Thomas Keller, The French Laundry; Yountville, CA
- Best Chef: Mid-Atlantic: Roberto Donna, Galileo; Washington, DC
- Best Chef: Midwest: Sanford D'Amato, Sanford; Milwaukee, WI
- Best Chef: New York City: Jean-Georges Vongerichten, JoJo; New York, NY
- Best Chef: Northeast: Christopher Schlesinger, East Coast Grill/Blue Room; Cambridge, MA
- Best Chef: Pacific Northwest/Hawaii: Alan Wong, Alan Wong's; Honolulu, HI
- Best Chef: Southeast: Guenter Seeger, The Dining Room at The Ritz-Carlton, Buckhead; Atlanta, GA
- Best Chef: Southwest: Mark Miller, Coyote Cafe; Santa Fe, NM
- Outstanding Restaurant Design: Ogawa/Depardon Architects, Bar 89; New York, NY
- Outstanding Restaurant Graphics: Mike Fink, The Double A; Santa Fe, NM

=== Book Awards ===
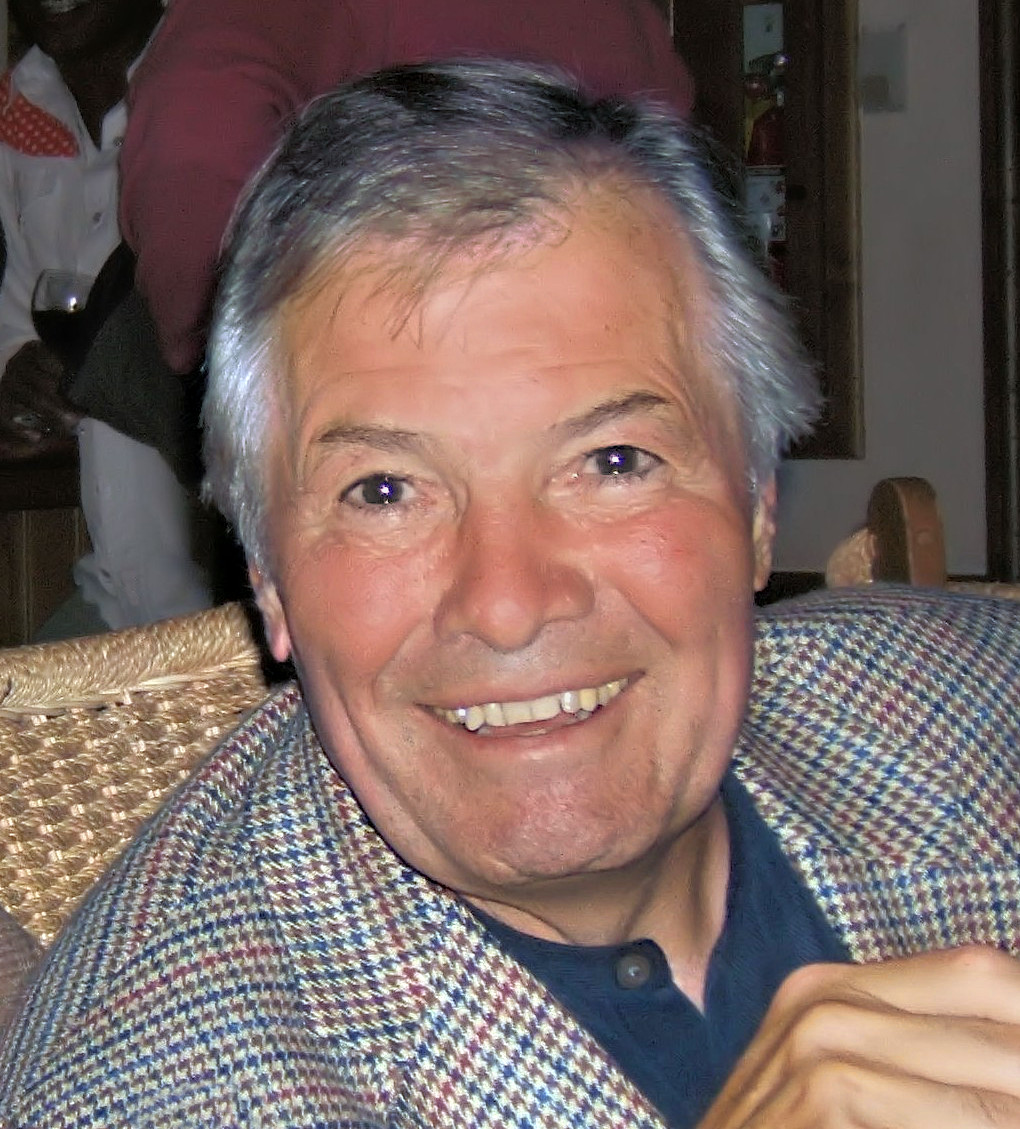
Jacques Pepin

- Cookbook Hall of Fame: La Technique and La Methode by Jacques Pepin
- Cookbook of the Year: Flatbreads and Flavors: A Baker's Atlas by Naomi Duguid and Jeffrey Alford
- Baking & Desserts: How to Bake by Nicholas Malgieri
- Best Food Photography: In & Out of the Kitchen in Fifteen Minutes of Less, photographer Sara Taylor
- Fruits, Vegetables & Grains: A Cook's Book of Mushrooms: With 100 Recipes for Common and Uncommon Varieties by Jack Czarnecki
- General Interest: Jim Fobel's Big Flavors by Jim Fobel
- Healthy Focus: Lighter, Quicker, Better: Cooking for the Way We Eat Today by Richard Sax and Marie Simmons
- International: Susanna Foo Chinese Cuisine: The Fabulous Flavors & Innovative Recipes of North America's Finest Chinese Cook by Susanna Foo
- Regional American: The Border Cookbook: Authentic Home Cooking of the American Southwest and Northern Mexico by Bill Jamison and Cheryl Alters Jamison
- Restaurants and Chefs: In Julia's Kitchen with Master Chefs by Julia Child
- Single Subject: The Whole World Loves Chicken Soup by Mimi Sheraton
- Vegetarian: High-Flavor, Low-Fat Vegetarian Cooking by Steven Raichlen
- Wine & Spirits: Wine Spectator's California Wine by James Laube
- Writings on Food: Becoming a Chef: With Recipes and Reflections from America's Leading Chefs by Andrew Dornenburg

=== Electronic Media Awards ===
- Best Local Television Cooking Show: Good Eating; host: Myke Motley, producer: Steve Dolinsky, CLTV
- Best National Television Cooking Show: In Julia's Kitchen with Master Chefs; host; Julia Child, producer: Geoffrey Drummond, WMVS/Milwaukee Public Television
- Best Radio Show on Food: Seasonings, host: Vertamae Grosvenor, producer: Sandra Rattley-Lewis; NPR
- Best Television Food Journalism: Yan Can Cook: The Best of China; host: Martin Yan, producer: DeAnne Hamilton D'Aria; KQED

=== Journalism Awards ===
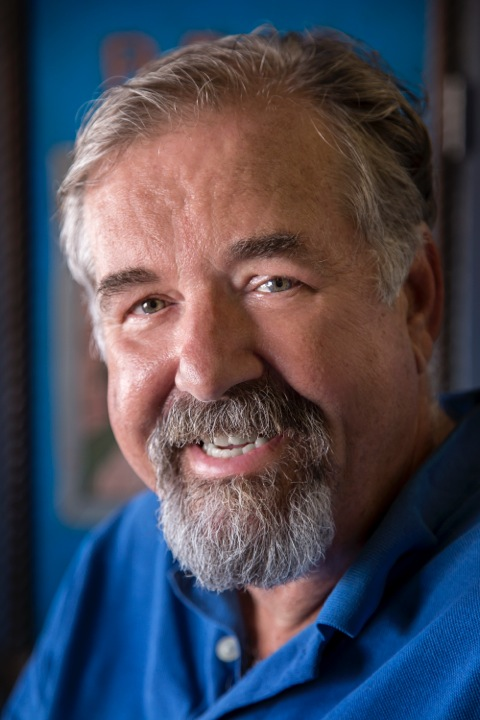
Robb Walsh

- M.F.K. Fisher Distinguished Writing: Paula Wolfert, "My Old Moroccan Home", Saveur
- Magazine Feature with Recipes: Robb Walsh, "Hot-Sauce Safari", American Way
- Magazine Feature without Recipes: Leslie Brenner, "Eureka! He Turns Oil Into Gold", Avenue
- Magazine Restaurant Review or Critique: Alan Richman, GQ
- Magazine Series: Elizabeth Schneider, "Purveyor", Food Arts
- Magazine Writing on Diet, Nutrition & Health: Ed Blonz, "Scientific Studies: How to Handle the Hype", Vegetarian Times
- Magazine Writing on Spirits, Wine & Beer: Michael Bonadies, "Cote de Beaune", Wine & Spirits
- Newspaper Feature Writing with Recipes: Kristin Eddy, "Tea-A Brand New Bag", The Atlanta-Journal/The Atlanta-Constitution
- Newspaper Feature Writing without Recipes: Bryan Miller, "Inside Peek at a 3-Star Kitchen", The New York Times
- Newspaper News Reporting: Daniel P. Puzo, "What Happened to California's Seafood?", Los Angeles Times
- Newspaper Restaurant Review or Critique: Ruth Reichl, The New York Times
- Newspaper Series: Steven Pratt, "On America's Plate", Chicago Tribune
- Newspaper Writing on Diet, Nutrition & Health: Jane Snow, "Food", The Beacon Journal
- Newspaper Writing on Spirits, Wine & Beer: Benjamin M. Myers, "It Must Be Spring-Bock is Back", The Washington Post

== 1997 awards ==
The 1997 James Beard Awards were presented on May 5, 1997, at the New York Marriott Marquis. The Monday-night ceremony was hosted by Joel Grey and Donna Hanover, while the journalism awards were announced on the preceding Friday.

=== Chef and Restaurant Awards ===
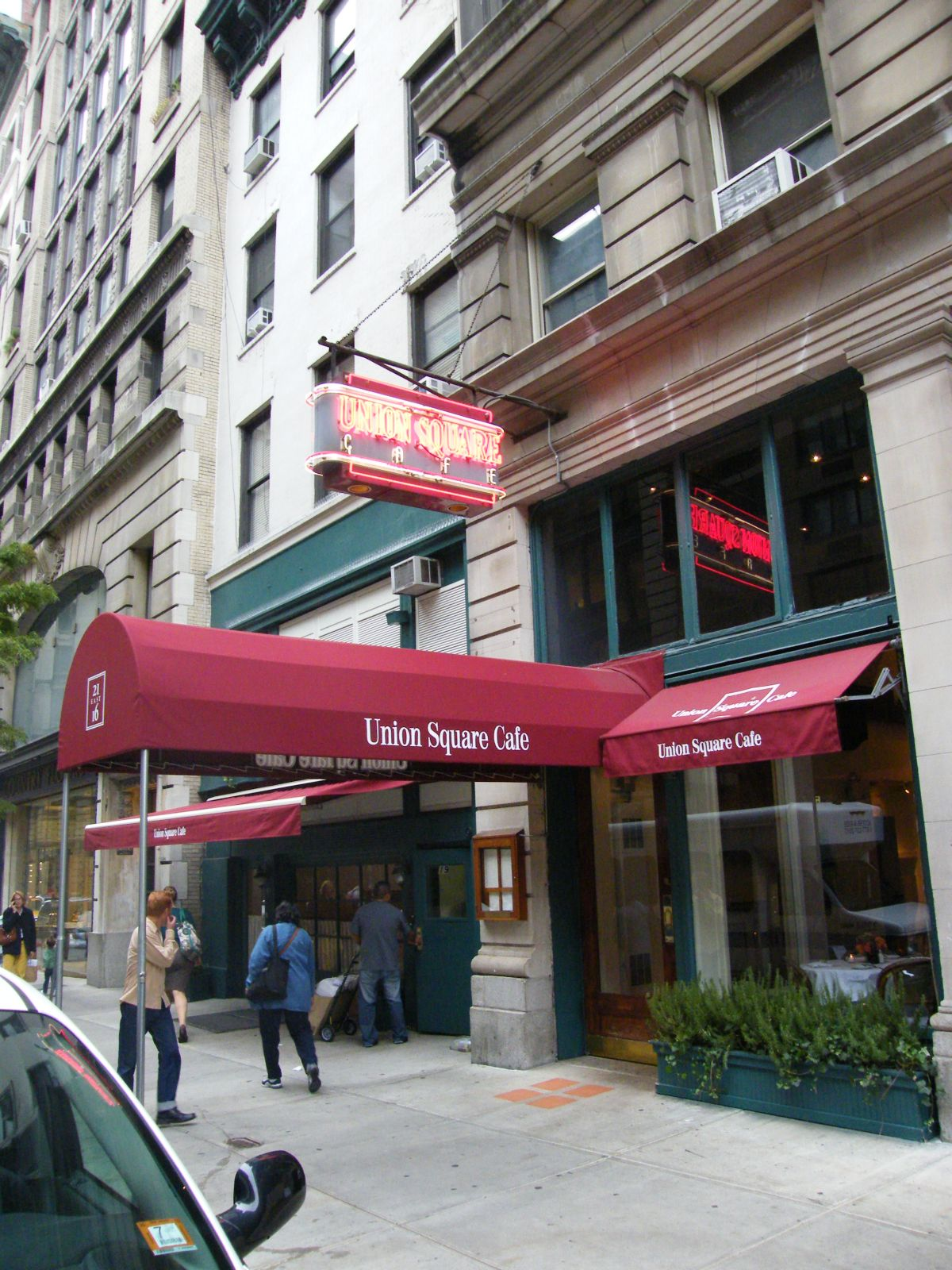
Union Square Cafe, New York City

Sources:

- Outstanding Chef: Thomas Keller, The French Laundry; Yountville, CA
- Lifetime Achievement Award: Joe Baum; New York, NY
- Humanitarian of the Year: Alice Waters, Chez Panisse; Berkeley, CA
- Outstanding Restaurant: Union Square Cafe; New York, NY
- Best New Restaurant: Rose Pistola; San Francisco, CA
- Rising Star Chef: Michael Mina, Aqua; San Francisco, CA
- Outstanding Pastry Chef: Richard Leach, Park Avenue Cafe; New York, NY
- Outstanding Service: Inn at Little Washington; Washington, VA
- Outstanding Wine & Spirits Professional: Zelma Long, Simi Winery; Healdsburg, CA
- Outstanding Wine Service: The Four Seasons; New York, NY
- Best Chef: California: Hubert Keller, Fleur de Lys; San Francisco, CA
- Best Chef: Mid-Atlantic: Susanna Foo, Susanna Foo; Philadelphia, PA
- Best Chef: Midwest: (TIE) Gabino Sotelino, Ambria; Chicago, IL AND Roland Liccioni, Le Francais; Wheeling, IL
- Best Chef: New York City: Charles Palmer, Aureole; New York, NY
- Best Chef: Northeast: Jody Adams, Rialto, The Charles Hotel; Cambridge, MA
- Best Chef: Pacific Northwest/Hawaii: Jeem Han Lock, Wild Ginger; Seattle, WA
- Best Chef: Southeast: Norman Van Aken, Norman's; Coral Gables, FL
- Best Chef: Southwest: George Mahaffey, Restaurant at Little Nell; Aspen, CO
- Outstanding Restaurant Design: Ferris Architects, Paci Restaurant; Southport, CT
- Outstanding Restaurant Graphics: Aerial, Lenox Room; New York, NY

=== Book Awards ===
- Cookbook Hall of Fame: French Provincial Cooking by Elizabeth David
- Cookbook of the Year: The Book of Jewish Food: An Odyssey from Samarkand to New York by Claudia Roden
- Baking & Desserts: Baking with Julia by Dorie Greenspan
- Best Food Photography: Lorenza's Pasta, photographer Gus Filgate
- Foods of Americas: An American Place by Larry Forgione
- Fruits and Vegetables: Chez Panisse Vegetables by Alice Waters
- General: Recipes 1-2-3 by Rozanne Gold
- Healthy Focus: Moosewood Restaurant Low-Fat Favorites by The Moosewood Collective
- International: Patricia Wells at Home in Provence by Patricia Wells
- Italian: La Cucina Sicilina di Gangivecchio by Wanda Tornabene, Giovanna Tornabene, and Michele Evans
- Reference and Food Guides: Steven Jenkins Cheese Primer by Steven Jenkins
- Single Subject: The Pasta Bible by Christian Teubner, Silvio Rizzi, and Tan Leng
- Special Occasions: Seasons of the Vineyard by Robert Mondavi, Margit Biever Mondavi, and Carolyn Dille
- Vegetarian: 1000 Vegetarian Recipes by Carol Gelles
- Wine & Spirits: A Wine and Food Guide to the Loire by Jacqueline Friedrich
- Writing on Food: Olives: The Life and Lore of a Noble Fruit by Mort Rosenblum

=== Electronic Media Awards ===
- Best Local Television Cooking Show or Segment: Good Eating; host/producer: Steve Dolinsky, CLTV
- Best National Television Cooking Segment: Jacques Pepin's Kitchen: Cooking with Claudine; host: Jacques Pepin, producer: Peter Stein, KQED
- Best National Television Cooking Show: Baking with Julia; host; Julia Child, producers: Geoffrey Drummond and Nat Katzman, PBS
- Best Radio Show on Food: Food Talk with Laurann Claridge, host/producer: Laurann Claridge; KPRC
- Best TV Food Journalism: Janis Robinson's Wine Course; host/producer: Jancis Robinson, WEDH

=== Journalism Awards ===
- M.F.K. Fisher Distinguished Writing: Alan Richman, "As Long as There's a Moishe's, There'll Always Be a Montreal", GQ
- Magazine Feature with Recipes: Margo True, "Inside the CIA", Gourmet
- Magazine Feature without Recipes: Michele Anna Jordon, "Serving Wener Herzog's Shoe", San Francisco Focus
- Magazine Restaurant Review or Critique: Alan Richman, GQ
- Magazine Series: Jane and Michael Stern, "Two for the Road", Gourmet
- Magazine Writing on Diet, Nutrition & Health: Peter Jaret, "Hyper Links", Eating Well
- Magazine Writing on Wine, Spirits and Beer: Gerald Asher, "Wine Journal: Beyond the Wine List", Gourmet
- Newspaper Feature Writing with Recipes: Jim Auchmutey, "Cast in Memory", The Atlanta Journal-Constitution
- Newspaper Feature Writing without Recipes: Robert Andrew Powell, "Eat Early, Eat Cheap", Miami New Times
- Newspaper News Reporting: Russ Parsons, "Toward a More 'Eatable' Nectarine", Los Angeles Times
- Newspaper Restaurant Review or Critique: Irene S. Virbila, Los Angeles Times
- Newspaper Series: Laurie Ochoa, "Taking Her Revolution Beyond the Kitchen," "Scenes from the Revolution," & "The Chez Panisse Years", Los Angeles Times
- Newspaper Writing on Diet, Nutrition & Health: Barbara Durbin, "To Wash or Not to Wash", The Oregonian
- Newspaper Writing on Spirits, Wine & Beer: David Shaw, "99 Bottles of Wine on the Block, 99 Bottles of Wine—Take One Down, Sell it Around, 98 Bottles of Wine on the Block", Los Angeles Times Magazine

== 1998 awards ==
The 1998 James Beard Awards were presented on May 4, 1998, at the New York Marriott Marquis. The journalism awards were announced on the preceding Friday.

=== Chef and Restaurant Awards ===
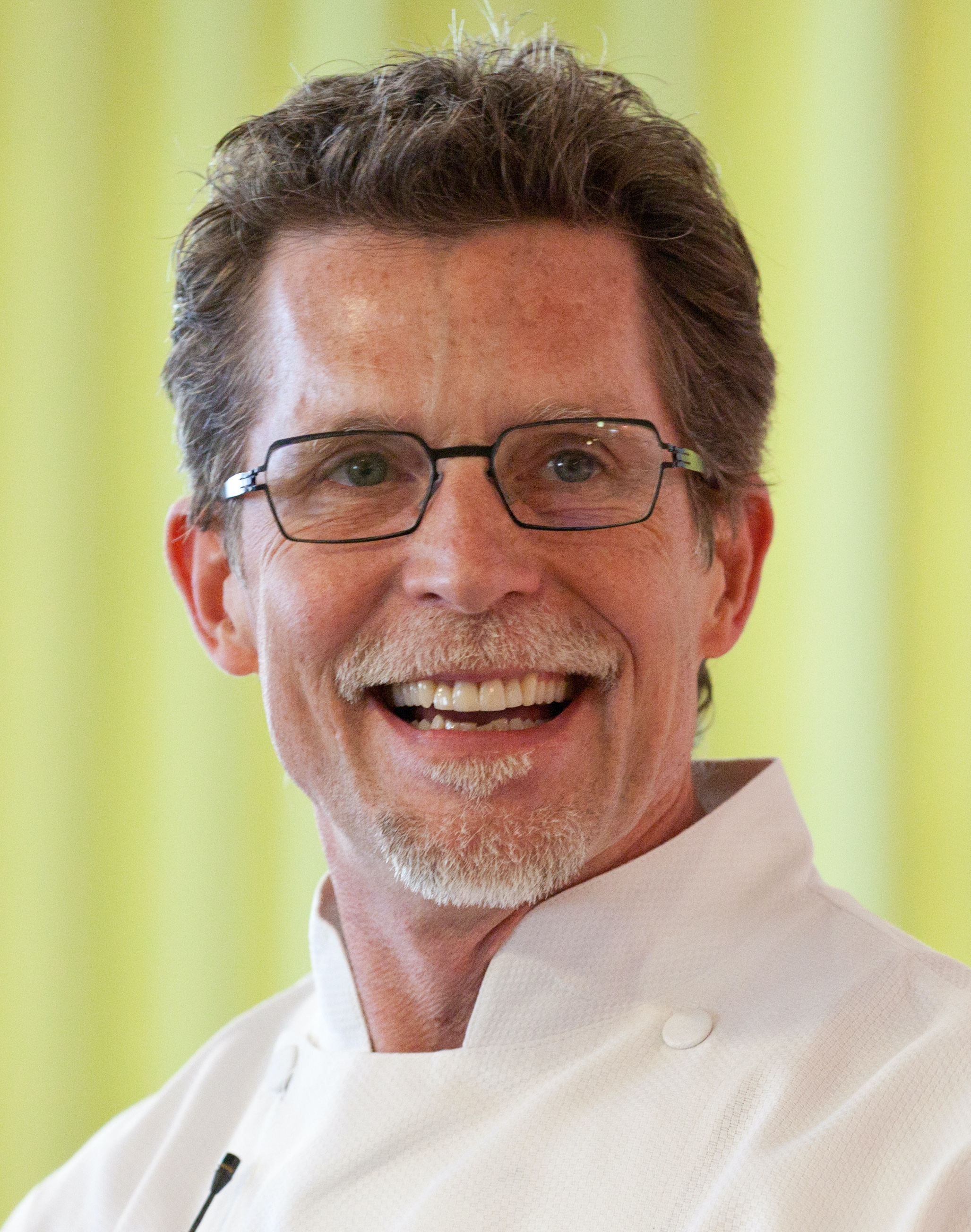
Rick Bayless

- Outstanding Chef: (TIE) Jean-Georges Vongerichten, Jean Georges; New York, NY AND Wolfgang Puck, Spago Beverly Hills; Beverly Hills, CA
- Lifetime Achievement Award: Madeleine Kamman; Barre, VT
- Humanitarian of the Year: Rick Bayless; Chicago, IL
- Outstanding Restaurant: Le Bernardin; New York, NY
- Best New Restaurant: Jean Georges; New York, NY
- Rising Star Chef: Keith Luce, Spruce; Aspen, CO
- Outstanding Pastry Chef: Stephen Durfee, The French Laundry; Yountville, CA
- Outstanding Service: The Four Seasons; New York, NY
- Outstanding Wine & Spirits Professional: Robert M. Parker; Monkton, MD
- Outstanding Wine Service: The Inn at Little Washington; Washington, VA
- Best Chef: California: Julian Serrano, Masa's; San Francisco, CA
- Best Chef: Mid-Atlantic: Georges Perrier, Le Bec-Fin; Philadelphia, PA
- Best Chef: Midwest: Sarah Stegner, Dining Room at The Ritz-Carlton; Chicago, IL
- Best Chef: New York City: Eric Ripert, Le Bernardin; New York, NY
- Best Chef: Northeast: Susan Regis, Biba; Boston, MA
- Best Chef: Northwest: (TIE) Thierry Rautureau, Rover's; Seattle, WA AND Cory Schreiber, Wildwood; Portland, OR
- Best Chef: South: Frank Brigtsen, Brigtsen's; New Orleans, LA
- Best Chef: Southwest: Alessandro Stratta, Mary Elaine's at The Phoenician; Scottsdale, AZ
- Outstanding Restaurant Design: Yabu Pushelberg, Monsoon; Toronto, Canada
- Outstanding Restaurant Graphics: Dan Evans Graphics, The French Laundry; Yountville, CA

=== Book Awards ===
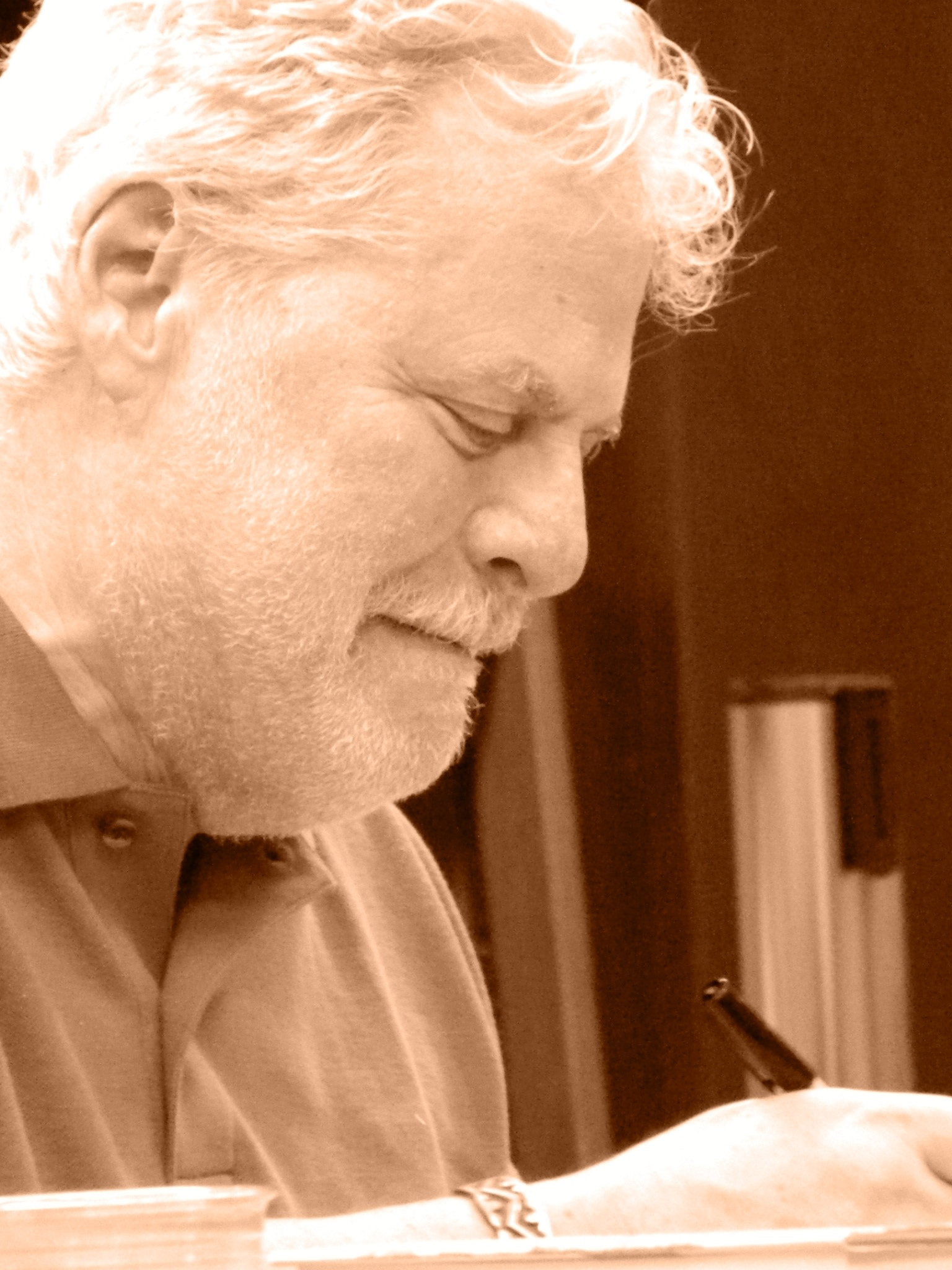
Mark Kurlansky

Sources:

- Cookbook Hall of Fame: Maida Heatter's Book of Great Desserts by Maida Heatter
- Cookbook of the Year: The New Making of a Cook: The Art, Technique and Science of Cooking by Madeleine Kamman
- Baking & Desserts: The Best Bread Ever by Charlie Van Over
- Best Food Photography: The Mezzo Cookbook with John Torode, photographers Diana Miller and James Murphy
- Entertaining & Special Occasions: Entertaining 101: Everything You Need to Know to Entertain with Style and Grace by Linda West Eckhardt and Katherine West Defoyd
- Food of the Americas: Fiesta: A Celebration of Latin Hospitality by Anya von Bremzen
- Food of the Mediterranean: Marcella Cucina by Marcella Hazan
- Food Reference & Technique: CookWise: The Hows and Whys of Successful Cooking by Shirley Corriher
- General: The New Making of a Cook: The Art, Technique and Science of Good Cooking by Madeleine Kamman
- Healthy Focus: American Medical Association Family Health Cookbook: Good Food That's Good For You by Brooke Dojny, C. Wayne Callaway, and Melanie Barnard
- International: The Food and Flavors of Haute Provence by Georgeann Brennan
- Single Subject: The Splendid Grain by Rebecca Wood
- Vegetarian: Vegetarian Cooking for Everyone by Deborah Madison
- Wine & Spirits: Côte d'Or by Clive Coates
- Writing on Food: Cod: A Biography of the Fish That Changed the World by Mark Kurlansky

=== Electronic Media Awards ===
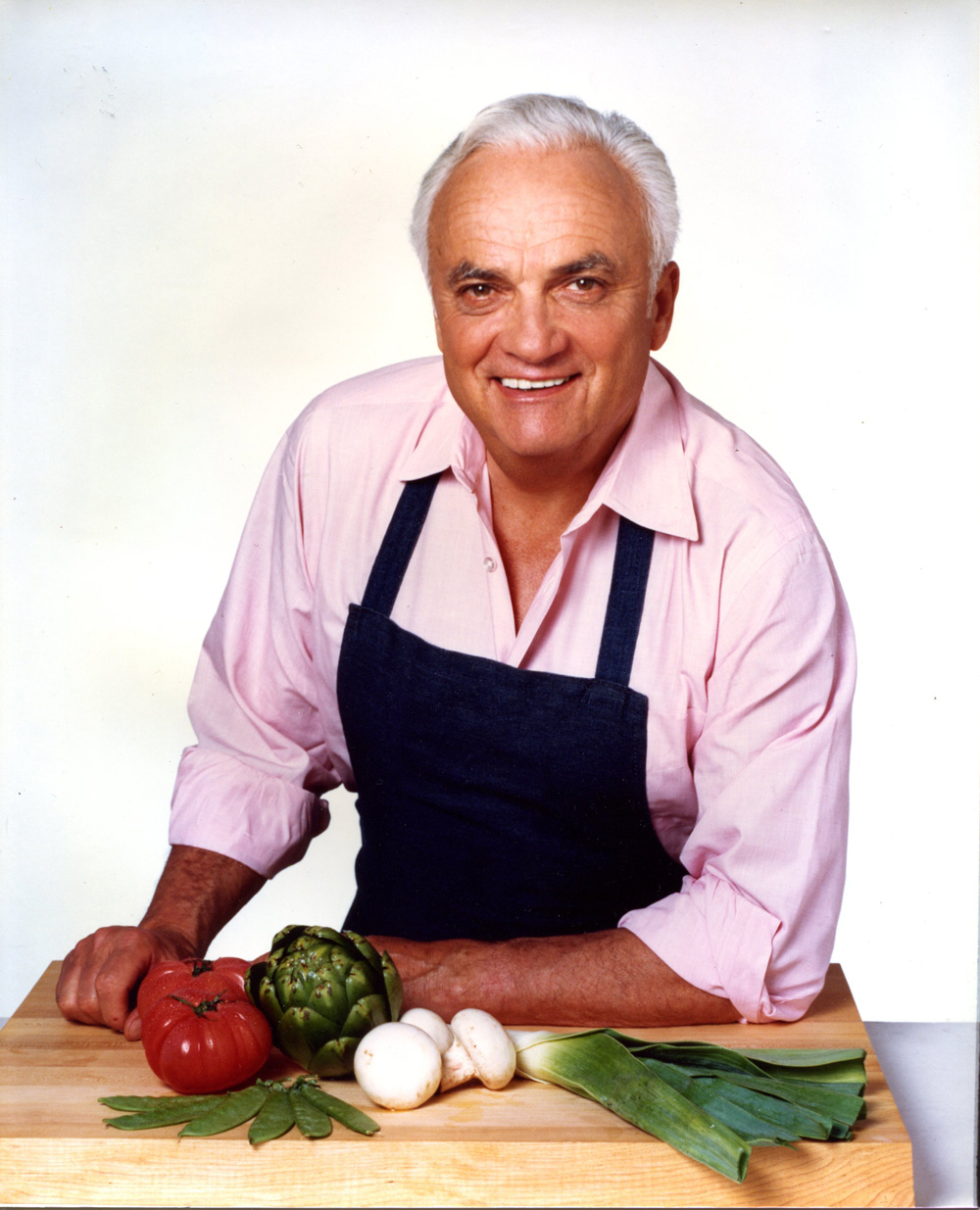
Pierre Franey

- Best Local Television Cooking Show or Segment: Good Eating; host: Steve Dolinsky, producers: Nelson Howard and Stephanie Kurtz, CLTV
- Best National Television Cooking Segment: Martha Stewart Living: Mrs. Maus's Fruitcake; host/producer: Martha Stewart, producer: Carolyn Kelly, CBS
- Best National Television Cooking Show: Pierre Franey's Cooking in Europe; host; Pierre Franey, producers: Charles Pinsky and John Potthast, MPT
- Best Local Radio Show On Food: Metropolis, host: Steve Dolinsky, producers: Justin Kaufmann and Aaron Freeman, WBEZ
- Best National Radio Show On Food: The Splendid Table, host: Lynne Rossetto Kasper, producers: Tom Voegeli and Sally Swift, PRI
- Best Television Food Journalism: Good Morning America-ABC News Greenmarket; host: Charles Gibson, producers: Margo Baumgard, Shelley Lewis, and Mark Lukasiewicz, ABC

=== Journalism Awards ===
- M.F.K. Fisher Distinguished Writing: Colman Andrews, "Cheese Toast", Saveur
- Magazine Feature with Recipes: Dorothy Kalins, "Kaiseki Modern: The Art of the Meal", Saveur
- Magazine Feature without Recipes: Molly O'Neill, "Chuck", San Francisco Magazine
- Magazine Restaurant Review or Critique: Alan Richman, GQ
- Magazine Series: Catharine Reynolds, "Paris Journal", Gourmet
- Magazine Writing on Diet, Nutrition & Health: Paula Kurtzweil, "Today's Special: Nutrition Information", FDA Consumer
- Magazine Writing on Spirits, Wine & Beer: Gerald Asher, "Wine Journal: The French Do It Differently", Gourmet
- News Reporting: Jane Snow, "Raspberry Shipments from Guatemala Halted", Akron Beacon Journal
- Newspaper Feature Writing with Recipes: Carole Sugarman and Stephanie Witt Sedgwick, "How Low Can you Go? Cut the Butter? Cut the Sugar? Cut the Eggs? After Baking 23 Cakes, Here's What We Found", The Washington Post
- Newspaper Feature Writing without Recipes: Russ Parsons, "Our Strawberry Roots", Los Angeles Times
- Newspaper Restaurant Review or Critique: Ruth Reichl, The New York Times
- Newspaper Series: Carol Sugarman, "The Road to Food Safety? How the Government's New Rules Will (and Won't) Protect Your Dinner," "An End to Food Scares? Reconsidering Irradiation, with All Its Pros and Cons," & "Food Scares: Just a Hot Topic or Are They on the Rise?", The Washington Post
- Newspaper Writing on Diet, Nutrition & Health: Suzanne Martinson, "Picky! Picky!", Pittsburgh Post-Gazette
- Newspaper Writing on Spirits, Wine & Beer: Judith Weinraub, "It's Hot Out There!", The Washington Post

== 1999 awards ==
The 1999 James Beard Awards were presented on May 3, 1999, at the New York Marriott Marquis. The journalism awards were announced at an earlier ceremony.

=== Chef and Restaurant Awards ===
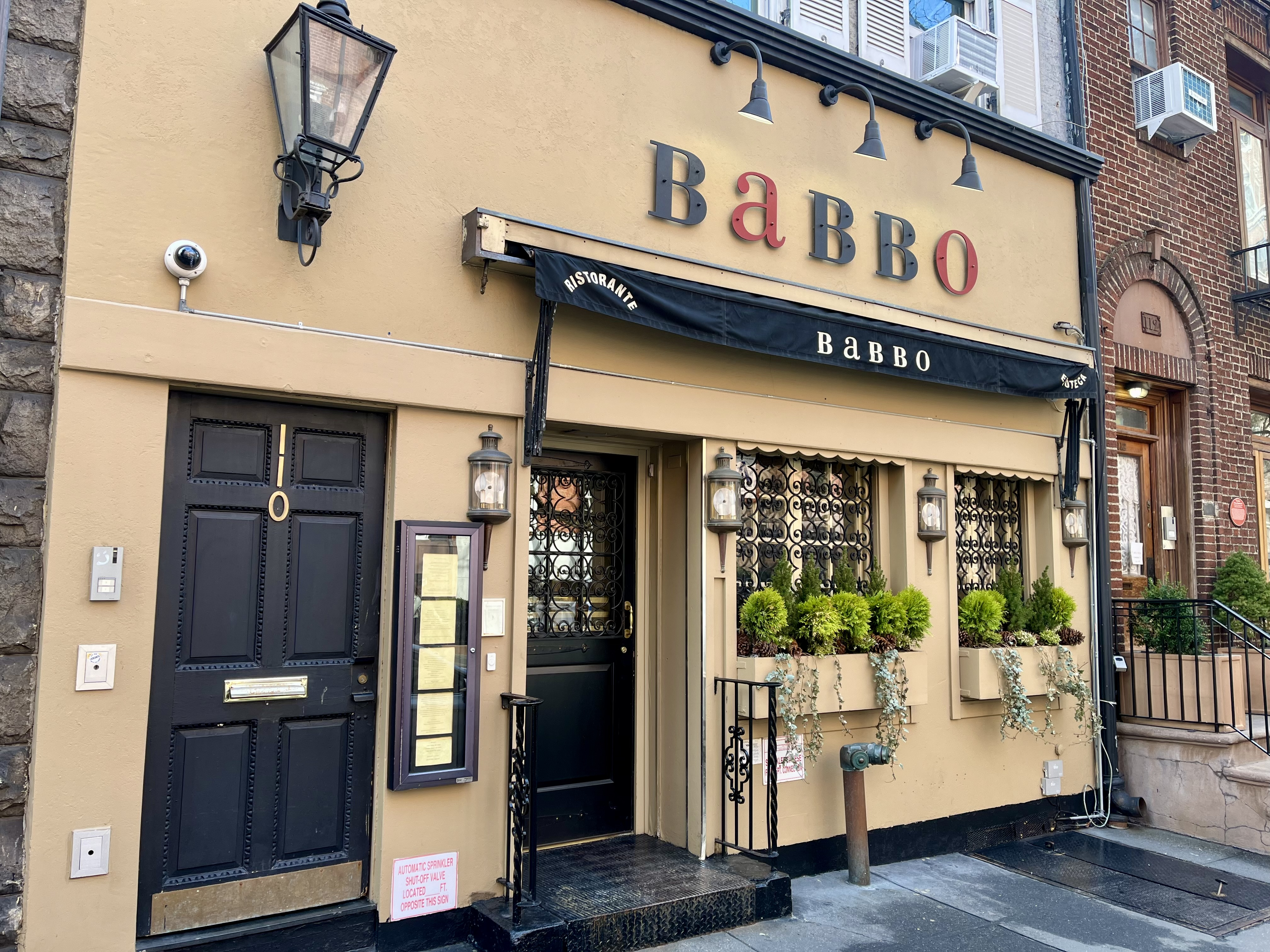
Babbo

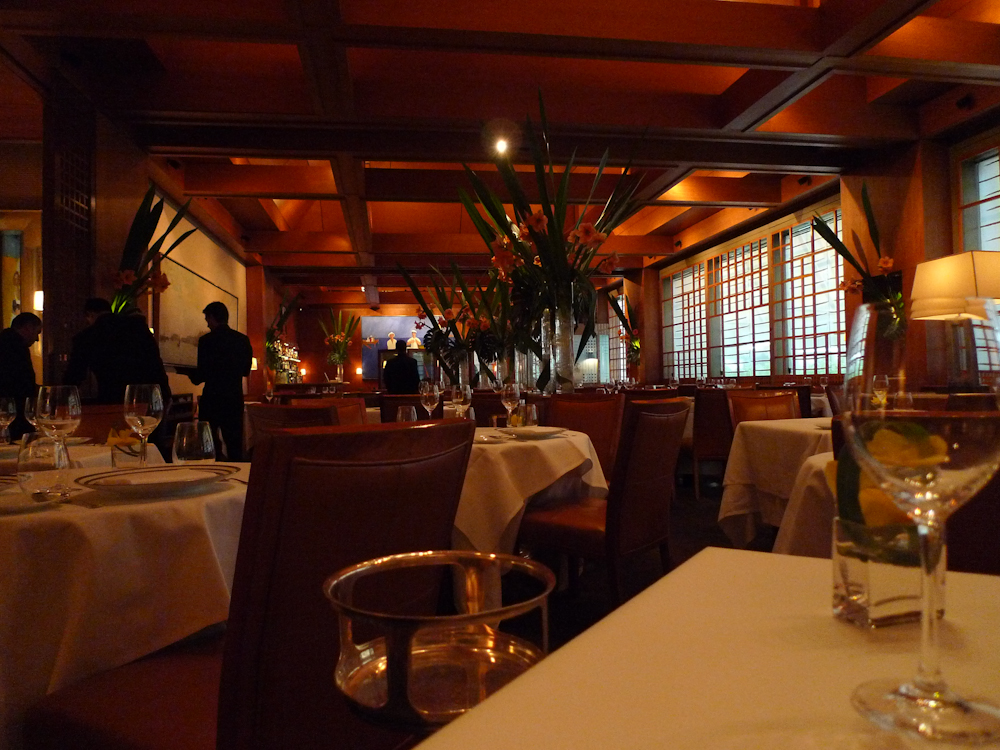
Le Bernardin

Sources:

- Outstanding Chef: Charlie Trotter, Charlie Trotter's; Chicago, IL
- Lifetime Achievement Award: Ferdinand Metz; Beacon, NY
- Humanitarian of the Year: Mary Risley; San Francisco, CA
- Outstanding Restaurant: The Four Seasons; New York, NY
- Best New Restaurant: Babbo; New York, NY
- Rising Star Chef: Marcus Samuelsson, Aquavit; New York, NY
- Outstanding Pastry Chef: Marcel Desaulniers, The Trellis; Williamsburg, VA
- Outstanding Service: Le Bernardin; New York, NY
- Outstanding Wine & Spirits Professional: Frank Prial; New York, NY
- Outstanding Wine Service: Union Square Cafe; New York, NY
- Best Chef: California: Paul Bertolli, Oliveto; Oakland, CA
- Best Chef: Mid-Atlantic: Jeffrey Buben, Vidalia; Washington, DC
- Best Chef: Midwest: Michael Smith and Debbie Gold, The American Restaurant; Kansas City, MO
- Best Chef: New York City: Lidia Bastianich, Felidia; New York, NY
- Best Chef: Northeast: Melissa Kelly, Old Chatham (at Shepherding Co. Inn); Old Chatham, NY
- Best Chef: Northwest/Hawaii: Christine Keff, Flying Fish; Seattle, WA
- Best Chef: Southeast: Jamie Shannon, Commander's Palace; New Orleans, LA
- Best Chef: Southwest: RoxSand Scocos RoxSand; Phoenix, AZ
- Outstanding Restaurant Design: Mark Cavagnero Assoc., MC Squared; San Francisco, CA
- Outstanding Restaurant Graphics: Propp & Gerin, MC Squared; San Francisco, CA

=== Book Awards ===
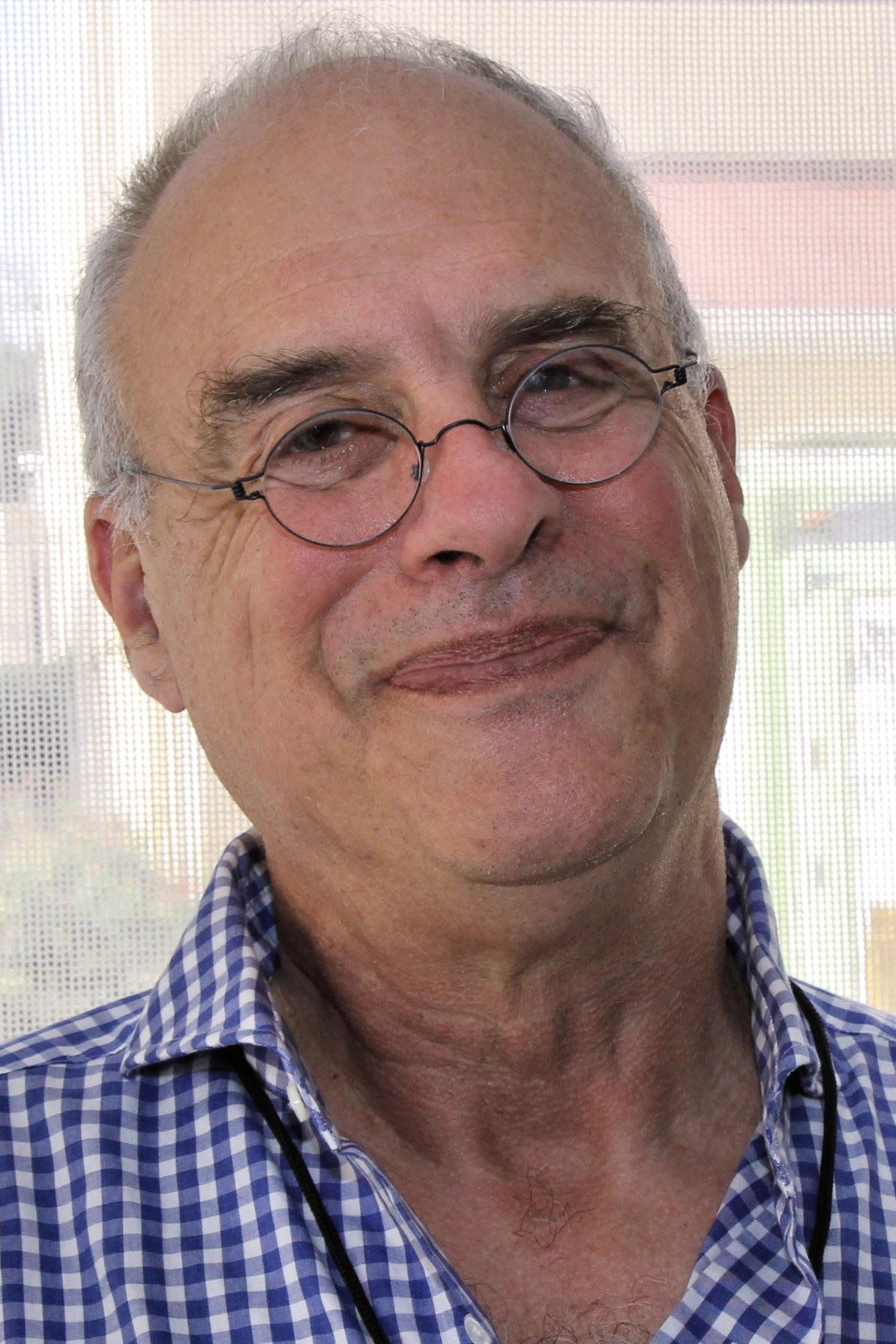
Mark Bittman

Sources:

- Cookbook Hall of Fame: The Doubleday Cookbook, Jean Anderson Cooks, The Food of Portugal, The Nutrition Bible, and The American Century Cookbook by Jean Anderson
- Cookbook of the Year: Smokehouse Ham, Spoon Bread & Scuppernong Wine by Joseph Dabney
- Americana: Saveur Cooks Authentic American by Colman Andrews and Dorothy Kalins
- Baking & Desserts: Crust & Crumb: Master Formulas For Serious Bread Makers by Peter Reinhart
- Best Food Photography: Charlie Trotter's Desserts, photographers Tim Turner and Paul Elledge
- Chefs and Restaurants: Jean-Georges: Cooking at Home with a Four-Star Chef by Jean-Georges Vongerichten and Mark Bittman
- Entertaining & Special Occasions: Nathalie Dupree's Comfortable Entertaining by Nathalie Dupree
- General: How to Cook Everything by Mark Bittman
- Healthy Focus: Steven Raichlen's Healthy Latin Cooking: 200 Sizzling Recipes from Mexico, Cuba, Caribbean, Brazil and Beyond by Steven Raichlen
- International: Mediterranean Grains and Greens by Paula Wolfert and Ellen Brown
- Reference and Writings on Food: Man Eating Bugs: The Art of Eating Insects by Peter Menzel and Faith D'Aluisio
- Single Subject: Wild About Game by Janie Hibler
- Vegetables and Vegetarian: Vegetables by James Peterson
- Wine & Spirits: 1855: A History of the Bordeaux Classification by Dewey Markham Jr.

=== Broadcast Media Awards ===
Sources:

- Best Local Television Food Broadcast: Good Eating; host/producer: Steve Dolinsky, producers: Nelson Howard and Stephanie Kurtz, CLTV
- Best National T.V. Food Journalism: Great Food; host: Molly O'Neill, producers: John McEwen and Christine Rylko, KCTS
- Best National Television Cooking Show: Jacques Pepin's Kitchen: Encore with Claudine; host; Jacques Pepin, producers: Peggy Lee Scott and Peter Stein, KQED
- Best Radio Show on Food: Bloomberg Executive Dining Guide, host: Peter Elliot, producers: Carmen Matias and Lori Hoffman, WBBR
- Best Radio Segment On Food: Weekend Edition, Sunday, host: Liane Hansen, producers: Robert Malesky and Carline Windall, NPR

=== Journalism Awards ===
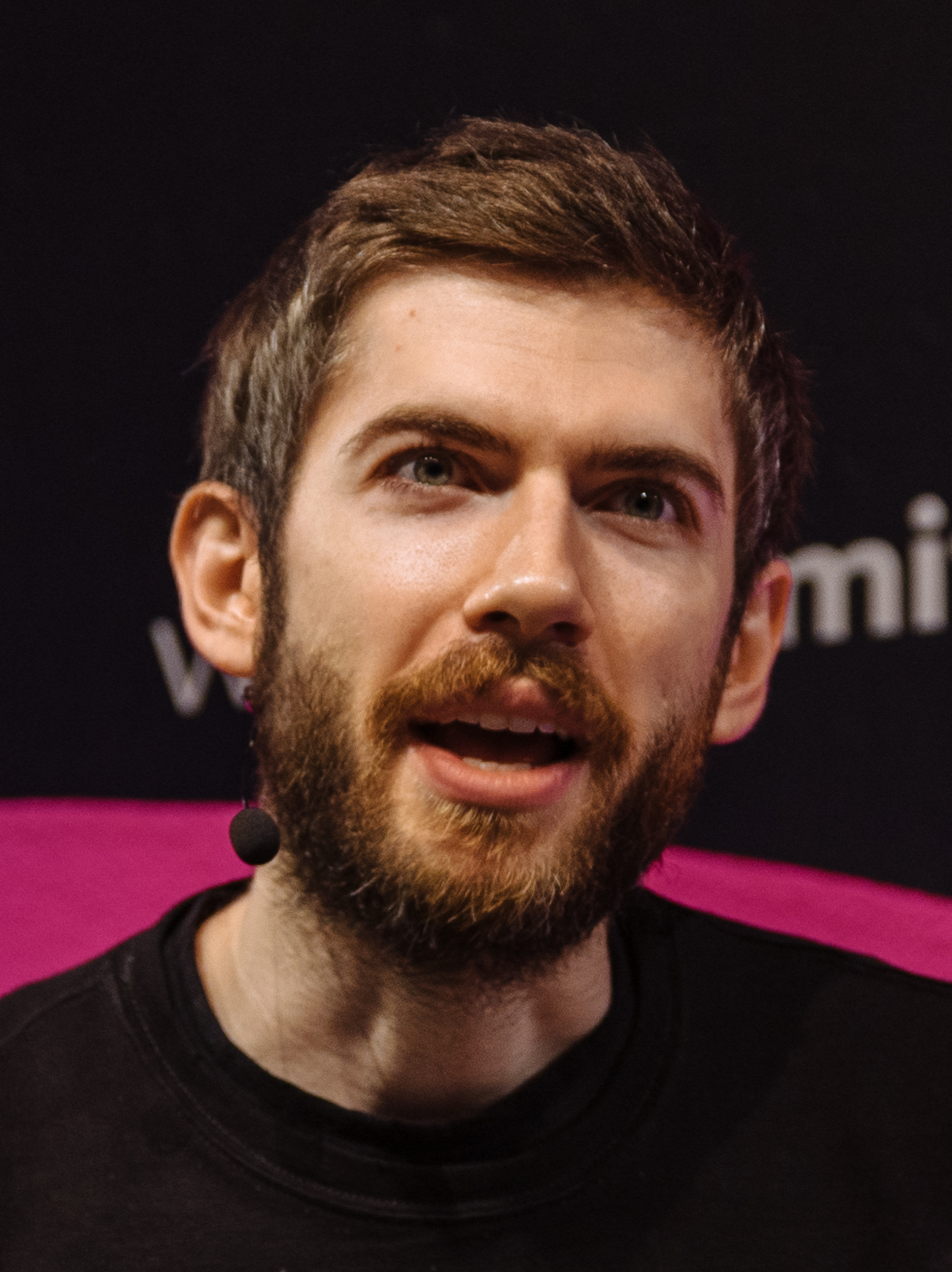
David Karp

Sources:

- M.F.K. Fisher Distinguished Writing: Corby Kummer, "Carried Away", The New York Times Magazine
- Magazine Feature with Recipes: Colman Andrews, "Burgundy: The Glory of French Food", Saveur
- Magazine Feature without Recipes: Michael Ruhlman, "An Alphabet Test of Nerves", Food Arts
- Magazine Restaurant Review or Critique: Arthur Lubow, Departures
- Magazine Series: Jane and Michael Stern, "Two For the Road", Gourmet
- Magazine Writing on Diet, Nutrition & Health: Jeffrey Steingarten, "Addicted to Losing", Vogue
- Magazine Writing on Spirits, Wine & Beer: William A. Marsano, "Great Scotch", Hemispheres
- News Reporting: Andy Badeker, "Gone Fishing", Chicago Tribune
- Newspaper Feature Writing with Recipes: Marian Burros, "Peektoe Crab: A Star is Born", The New York Times
- Newspaper Feature Writing without Recipes: David Karp, "Asian Pears", Los Angeles Times
- Newspaper Restaurant Review or Critique: Jonathan Gold, L.A. Weekly
- Newspaper Series: Kristin Eddy, Andy Badeker, and Andrew Solomon, American Originals: "A Piece of Heaven," "Chicken Fried State," & "The One True Cue", Chicago Tribune
- Newspaper Writing on Diet, Nutrition & Health: Cheri Swoboda and Merle Alexander, "Fill Up on Calcium", The Oregonian
- Newspaper Writing on Spirits, Wine & Beer: Janet Fletcher, "Sending Back the Bottle", San Francisco Chronicle
