= Stephen Jenkins =

Stephen Jenkins may refer to:

- Stephan Jenkins (born 1964), American musician and the frontman of the alternative rock band Third Eye Blind
- Stephen Beckett (born 1967), née Stephen Jenkins, English actor
- Chad Jenkins (Stephen Chadwick Jenkins, born 1987), pitcher for the Toronto Blue Jays
- Stephen Jenkins (footballer) (born 1980), English football player (Brentford)
- Stephen Rice Jenkins (1858–1929), physician and political figure in Prince Edward Island, Canada
- Steve Jenkins (author), (1952–2021) American children's book author and illustrator
- Steve Jenkins (born 1972), Welsh football player
- Steven Jenkins (born 1978), English cricketer
