= RoxSand Scocos =

American chef

RoxSand Scocos McCreary (born 1958, Washington (state) is a James Beard award winning chef (1999 Best Chef in the Southwest), who was the first person to be on the cover of Bon Appétit.

In 1990, she opened the farm to table RoxSand Restaurant & Bar in Phoenix, Arizona. She did not renew her lease when it expired in 2003, preferring to spend more time with her family.
