= Caprial Pence =

Caprial Pence is a chef who won the James Beard Foundation Award: 1990|1991 James Beard Award for Best Chef in the Northwest. At the time, she was a chef at Fullers in Seattle. While at Fullers, she was nominated for the rising star chef.

She went on to open her own restaurant, Caprial’s Westmoreland Kitchen in her native Portland (Oregon). She also wrote nine cookbooks and with her husband John, hosted a PBS cooking show and on The Learning Channel.

Pence left working as a chef to become the Seattle and Portland, Oregon culinary director for the online food delivery service Munchery. She had been in charge of Seattle’s Kimpton Alexis Hotel Bookstore Bar and Cafe.

Since 2019, she has been the co-owner of Madison Kitchen in Seattle.

Pence also appeared on Beat Bobby Flay (Season 8, episode 4).

== Biography ==
She was born in the state of Washington and raised in Portland, Oregon. Her maternal grandfather was considered a very good home cook and inspired her interest in cooking. She went on to attend the Hyde Park campus of the Culinary Institute of America. Though accepted right out of high school, she had to wait until 1982, a year later, because the class was too full. She was one of four women in her class.
