= Susanna Foo =

Chinese chef

- Born: Inner Mongolia
- Education: The Culinary Institute of America
- Spouse: E-Hsin Foo (1966-2010)
- Culinary career
- Cooking style: French/Chinese fusion cuisine
- Current restaurant
- Previous restaurants: SuGa; Hu-Nan; Susanna Foo; Susanna Foo Gourmet Kitchen; Suilan
- Awards won: 1996 James Beard Foundation Award for Best International Cook Book; 1997 James Beard Foundation Award for Best Chef: Mid-Atlantic
- Website: Official website

Susanna Foo is a Chinese chef best known for her work in Chinese/French fusion at her self titled Susanna Foo restaurant in Philadelphia, Pennsylvania. She has also owned and run other restaurants in Philadelphia and Atlantic City, and is a two-time James Beard Foundation Award winner.

== Career ==
Susanna Foo was born in the Inner Mongolia area of China, and grew up in the Shanxi province. Her father was a General in the National Revolutionary Army, and so during the latter stages of the Chinese Civil War, she moved to live on Taiwan. While in college in Taiwan studying for a bachelor's degree in history she met, and would later marry in 1966, E-Hsin Foo. Together they moved to the United States, so he could study at Carnegie-Mellon University. Initially, she worked as a librarian. She was not taught how to cook by her mother, and took a cooking course in Taiwan prior to travelling to the United States as part of her preparations.

They moved to Philadelphia, Pennsylvania, in 1979, to help his family run their Chinese restaurant Hu-Nan. Prior to this, Susanna had never worked in a professional kitchen. When Jacob Rosenthal of The Culinary Institute of America dined at the restaurant, he was inspired by her work. He arranged for her to dine at the best Chinese restaurants in New York City, and for consultants to train her in French cuisine, as well as inviting her to attend the Culinary Institute itself. She would later dedicate her first cook book to Rosenthal, saying that he changed her life.

Foo decided to move away from traditional Chinese food, when in 1987, she opened her self titled Susanna Foo restaurant, serving a fusion of Chinese and French cuisines. It was named the best new restaurant of the year by Esquire magazine, and Food & Wine magazine named her the best new chef in 1989. In 1995, her first cook book was published, entitled Susanna Foo Chinese Cuisine: The Fabulous Flavors and Innovative Recipes of North America's Finest Chinese Cook.

This won her a James Beard Foundation Award for best international cookbook, and she won a second James Beard Foundation Award in 1997 for Best Chef in the Mid-Atlantic region. She opened a new restaurant, named Suilan, within the Borgata, a hotel and casino complex, in Atlantic City in 2003. A second cook book followed in 2005, Susanna Foo Fresh Inspiration — New Approaches to Chinese Cuisine.

In 2009, she made the decision to sell Susanna Foo after running it for 22 years. Her husband had fallen ill, and she still had another restaurant closer to home in Radnor, Pennsylvania, Susanna Foo Gourmet Kitchen. Foo's husband died a year later, and she closed the Radnor restaurant in 2015.

At the age of 72, Foo came out of retirement in 2016 to open a new restaurant, Suga, with her son Gabriel. He had wanted to open a restaurant, and Foo felt that she was not yet finished with demonstrating modern Chinese cuisine. Some of the dishes are an evolution from those served in her previous restaurant, while others are inspired by her frequent trips to China.
