= Charlie van Over =

American restaurateur and food writer

- Born: 1937 or 1938 (age 88–89)
- Education: Taft School; Johns Hopkins University
- Spouse: Priscilla Martel
- Culinary career
- Previous restaurant: Restaurant du Village (1979–1990)
- Award won: James Beard award 1998
- Website: charlesvanover.com

Charlie van Over is an American restaurateur, food writer and baker who is an authority on the subject of baking bread.

== Career ==
His book The Best Bread Ever won the James Beard Foundation Award for the baking and dessert category in 1998. He pioneered a radical and efficient breadmaking method using a food processor for 45 seconds to avoid the drudgery of preparing bread by kneading it by hand. He got the idea at a party for the Cuisinart inventor Carl Sontheimer, and after experimenting for several years, he developed his breadmaking technique.

He was instrumental in inspiring the culinary guru Nathan Myhrvold to devote a sustained multi-year investigation into the subject of baking bread, which resulted in Myhrvold's best-selling book Modernist Bread. Van Over patented a kitchen implement called the Bâtard Folding Picnic Knife as well as an oven stone for baking bread. He collaborated with his friend and fellow chef Jacques Pépin on recipes and techniques. With his wife and fellow restaurateur Priscilla Martel, he opened Restaurant du Village in the town of Chester, Connecticut, which helped make the town "a destination" according to The New York Times.

== Personal life ==
He resides in Chester, Connecticut.

== Publications ==
- The Best Bread Ever, Broadway Books, November 3, 1997, ISBN 978-0767900324, Charlie van Over with Priscilla Martel
