= Steve Dolinsky =

American journalist

- Born: 1968 (age 57–58); St. Cloud, Minnesota, U.S.
- Education: University of Wisconsin–Madison
- Occupations: Food & Travel Journalist
- Years active: 1990–present
- Known for: food reporting on WLS-TV as "Hungry Hound" (2003-2021) and WMAQ-TV as "The Food Guy" (2021-2026)
- Spouse: Amy Dordek (present)
- Website: https://stevedolinsky.com/

Steve Dolinsky (born 1968) is an American television, radio, print, and podcast food and travel reporter. He has reported as “Hungry Hound” on ABC 7 (Chicago) from 2003 to 2021 and as "The Food Guy" on NBC 5 (Chicago) from 2021 to 2026. He also submits food reports for Public Radio International’s “The World” and is co-host with Rick Bayless and producer of The Feed Podcast. He is the author of a guide to Chicago pizza titled Pizza City, USA, which was published by Northwestern University Press in 2018. The book challenges the perception that the favorite and most common pizza in Chicago is deep-dish style pizza. Dolinsky currently is employed by Levy Restaurants.

== Early life ==
Dolinsky was born in 1968 in St. Cloud, Minnesota and raised in a kosher household. He earned a BA in Journalism and History at the University of Wisconsin–Madison.

== Honors ==
Dolinsky has been recognized twelve times with the James Beard Foundation Award for excellence in cuisine, culinary writing, and culinary education in the United States.
