= James Peterson (writer) =

American educator, perfumer and writer (born 20th century)

James Peterson (born 20th century) is an American writer, cookery teacher, and perfumer.

== Education and career ==
He studied chemistry at the University of California at Berkeley.

After traveling the world and moving to Paris, he apprenticed at Paris's Le Cordon Bleu. He worked at Le Vivarois, then moved to Vonnas to work at Chez La Mere Blanc (now Restaurant Georges Blanc).

In 1979, he returned to New York City, becoming a partner at Greenwich Village's Le Petit Robert.

Starting in 1984, he taught for four years at the French Culinary Institute in Manhattan, where he wrote the advanced curriculum.

His first book, Sauces, written in 1990, won an award for best single subject and the Cookbook of the Year Award from the James Beard Foundation. He went on to write fourteen more cookbooks and win an additional five James Beard Awards, making for seven in all. Peterson is responsible for virtually all the photography in his books.

Since 2011, James has been studying perfumes in his home laboratory. In 2011, he launched Brooklyn Perfume Company.

He resides in Brooklyn, New York, where he is actively developing new perfumes and running a small business.

== Books ==
- Sauces (2 ed.). Wiley. 1998. ISBN 978-0-471-29275-3.
- Splendid Soups. 1993. ISBN 978-0-553-07505-2.
- Fish & Shellfish: The Cook's Indispensable Companion. William Morrow Cookbooks. 1996. ISBN 978-0-688-12737-4.
- Peterson, James; Schwartz, Justin (1998). Vegetables. ISBN 0-688-14658-9.
- Peterson, James (1999). Essentials of Cooking. Artisan Books. ISBN 1-57965-236-0.
- Splendid Soups: Recipes and Master Techniques for Making the World's Best Soups. Wiley. 2000. ISBN 978-0-471-39136-4. New printing.
- Simply Salmon. Stewart, Tabori and Chang. 2001. ISBN 978-1-58479-026-6.
- Peterson, James (2002). Sweet Wines: A Guide to the World's Best with Recipes. Harry N. Abrams. ISBN 1-58479-255-8.
- Glorious French Food: A Fresh Approach to the French Classics. John Wiley & Sons. 2002. ISBN 978-0-471-44276-9.
- Peterson, James (2003). The Duck Cookbook. Harry N. Abrams. ISBN 1-58479-295-7.
- Simply Shrimp: With 80 Globally Inspired Recipes. Stewart, Tabori & Chang. 2007. ISBN 978-1-58479-585-8.
- What's a Cook to Do?: An Illustrated Guide to 500 Essential Tips, Techniques, and Tricks. Artisan. 2007. ISBN 978-1-57965-318-7.
- Cooking. Ten Speed Press. 2007. ISBN 978-1-58008-789-6.
- Sauces: Classical and Contemporary Sauce Making (3 ed.). Wiley. 2008. ISBN 978-0-470-19496-6.
- Baking. Ten Speed Press. 2009. ISBN 978-1-58008-991-3.
- Sauces: Classical and Contemporary Sauce Making (4 ed.). Wiley. 2017. ISBN 978-0544819825.

== Awards ==
- Winner, 1992 James Beard Foundation, Cookbook of the Year for Sauces
- Winner, 1992 James Beard Foundation, Single Subject Cookbook for Sauces
- Nominee, 1994 James Beard Foundation, for The Splendid Soup: Recipes and Master Techniques for Making the World's Best Soups
- Winner, 1997 International Association of Culinary Professionals, for Fish and Shellfish
- Nominee, 1997 James Beard Foundation, Single Subject Cookbook for Fish and Shellfish
- Winner, 1999 James Beard Foundation, Vegetables and Vegetarian for Vegetables.
- Nominee, 2000 International Association of Culinary Professionals, for Essentials of Cooking
- Nominee, 2000 James Beard Foundation, Reference Cookbook for Essentials of Cooking
- Winner, 2003 James Beard Foundation, Mediterranean Cookbook for Glorious French Food
- Winner, 2008 James Beard Foundation, General Cookbook for Cooking
- Winner, 2010 James Beard Foundation, Baking & Desserts Cookbook for Baking
- Winner, 2011 James Beard Foundation, Single Subject for Meat

== See also ==
- List of American writers
- List of people from Brooklyn
