= Maureen Callahan (food writer) =

Maureen Callahan is an American dietitian and writer about health food and dieting.

== Biography ==
Callahan trained at Le Cordon Bleu in Paris. She has won two James Beard Foundation Awards; one in 1994 for "Magazine Writing on Diet, Nutrition & Health" for a piece "Diets don't work", and a Book Award in the "Focus on Health" category for The New Mayo Clinic Cookbook (ISBN 9780848728120) in 2005. She was the lead author for Health.com's Diet Guide.

Callahan was a health columnist for Parents and Meredith’s Mature Outlook. She was also a Senior Editor at Tufts University Health Letter and wrote for the Mayo Clinic Health Letter. She also wrote for Redbook, Reader’s Digest and Better Homes & Gardens. She contributed recipes to the first edition of Eat, Drink and Be Healthy: The Harvard Medical School Guide to Healthy Eating.
