= Anya von Bremzen =

Russian-born American culinary writer

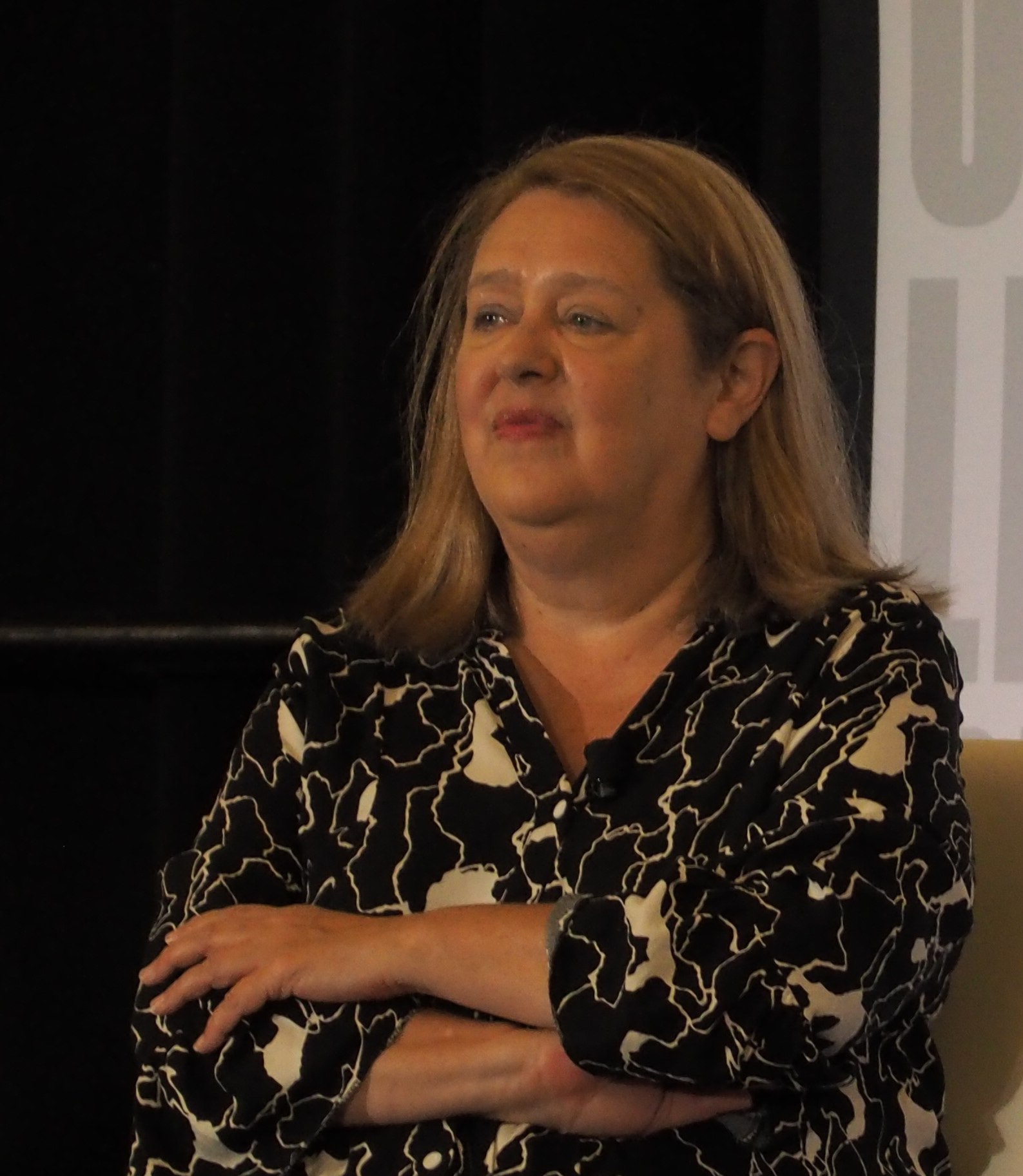
- Anya von Bremzen at the 2023 National Book Festival
- Born: Russian SFSR, USSR
- Occupation: writer
- Writing career
- Pen name: Anya von Bremzen
- Genre: food writing
- Website: twitter.com/vonbremzen

Anya von Bremzen is a Russian-born American culinary writer. Born in 1963 in Soviet Russia, she and her mother moved to Philadelphia, Pennsylvania in 1974 as stateless Jewish refugees. She originally trained as a concert pianist at the Juilliard School, but a hand injury forced her to change career directions. Fluent in Italian, she translated an Italian cookbook to English, and then wrote a cookbook of her own.

Von Bremzen also writes about foodways, culinary history and customs, and memoirs. Her sixth book, published in 2013, is a memoir about life, food, and rationing in the U.S.S.R. Her eighth book, published in 2023, is about the history and myths of famous dishes tied to Paris, Naples, Tokyo, Seville, Oaxaca, and Istanbul, and what a national dish tells us about a nation's values, traditions, and understanding of itself.

== Awards and honors ==
Her work has received three James Beard Foundation Award:

- 1991: Book award winner in the International category for Please to the Table: The Russian Cookbook.
- 1998: Book award winner in the Food of The Americas category for Fiesta!: A Celebration of Latin Hospitality.
- 2010: Journalism award winner in the Magazine Feature Writing About Restaurants and/or Chefs category for her article "Soul of a City" in Saveur magazine.

== Bibliography ==
- von Bremzen, Anya (1990). Please to the Table: The Russian Cookbook. ISBN 0894807536.
- von Bremzen, Anya (1995). Terrific Pacific Cookbook. ISBN 9781563058684.
- von Bremzen, Anya (1997). Fiesta!: A Celebration of Latin Hospitality. ISBN 9780385475266.
- von Bremzen, Anya (2003). The Greatest Dishes: Around the World in 80 Recipes. ISBN 9780060197315.
- von Bremzen, Anya (2005). The New Spanish Table. ISBN 9780761135555.
- von Bremzen, Anya (2013). Mastering the Art of Soviet Cooking: A Memoir of Food and Longing. ISBN 9780307886828.
- von Bremzen, Anya (2017). Paladares: Recipes Inspired by the Private Restaurants of Cuba. ISBN 9781683351450.
- von Bremzen, Anya (2023). National Dish: Around the World in Search of Food, History, and the Meaning of Home. ISBN 9780735223165.

== See also ==
- Food writing
- Foodways
- Russian cuisine
- Soviet cuisine
