= Christopher Gross =

American chef

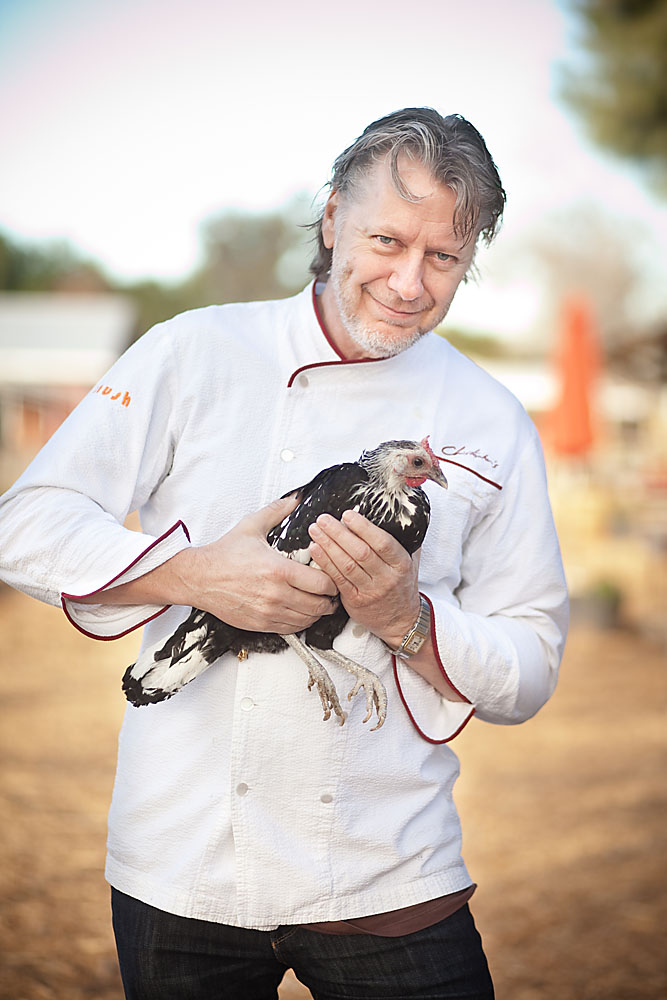
- Website: www.christophersaz.com

Christopher Gross is an American chef and businessman owning, Christopher's at Wrigley Mansion (located in Biltmore Circle in Phoenix, Arizona). Currently, his third restaurant concept.

== Recognition ==
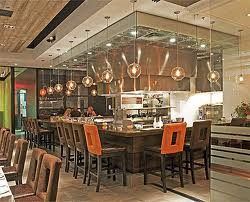
Christopher's Dining Room

In 1995, Gross won the James Beard Award, and in 1997 he was the first chef in Arizona to win the Robert Mondavi Culinary Award of Excellence. Food & Wine magazine named Gross one of America's 10 Best New Chefs in 1989. In 2016 he was presented with the Lifetime Achievement Award from the Scottsdale Culinary Hall of Fame.

Christopher's past endeavor, Christopher's Restaurant and Crush Lounge at the Biltmore Fashion Park, Phoenix, Az. It consistently earned recognition, including 2015 Best French Restaurant from Phoenix New Times, 2015 Award of Excellence from Wine Spectator, and 2015 Diner's Choice from Open Table.

Previously, Christopher's Fermier Brasserie & Paola's Wine Bar was named America's Best Restaurant, Phoenix & Scottsdale (Gourmet Magazine 2002), Best French Restaurant in Best of Phoenix 2002, 2003 2012 (Phoenix New Times), and Best Lunch in The Rep's Best of 2002 (Arizona Republic). PBS Channel Eight featured Christopher's and Crush Lounge in its show, Check Please

== Media and Consulting ==
Gross has consulted for Club Med, Crystal Cruises, Cunard Cruise Lines and Disney. He served on panels with Jacques Pepin and Julia Child at the Food & Wine Classic in Aspen, and he and his recipes are in cookbooks and television shows, including the Julia Child PBS series, and the cookbook "In Julia's Kitchen with Master Chefs," "Chef's Night Out," "Best of Food & Wine," "Art Culinaire," "America's Best Chefs," and "Grand Finales."

== Community Involvement ==
Gross began the Arizona chapter of the American Institute of Wine & Food and served as its founding chairman. He is on the National Council for the American Liver Foundation, was the co-founder of the American Liver Foundation's “Flavors of Phoenix” events, and was a former Chair of the Share Our Strength's “Taste of the Nation” events. Gross was also on the National Advisory Board for the James Beard Foundation and the Advisory Board of the Art Institute of Phoenix.
