= Sarah Stegner =

American chef

- Born: Evanston, Illinois
- Spouse: Rohit Nambiar
- Culinary career
- Current restaurants
- Prairie Grass Cafe; Prairie Fire
- Television show
- Great Chefs
- Awardss
- James Beard Foundation Award Rising Star Chef 1994; James Beard Foundation Award Best Chef Midwest 1998

Sarah Stegner is an American chef, who co-owns and runs the Prairie Grass Cafe. She has won two James Beard Foundation Awards, for Rising Star Chef in 1994 and Best Chef Midwest in 1998.

== Career ==
Born and raised in Evanston, Illinois, Sarah Stegner's grandmother worked as a caterer. Stegner studied classical guitar at Northwestern University, before deciding to become a chef. She went to the Dumas Pere Cooking School, and after graduating, she landed a position at the Ritz-Carlton Hotel, Chicago. She worked her way up, eventually becoming sous chef to George Bumbaris. While there, she won two James Beard Foundation Awards, first for Rising Star Chef in 1994 and then four years later for Best Chef Midwest. Stegner appeared twice on the television series Great Chefs, first in 1994, and then again in 1998 for a barbecue special in collaboration with Weber-Stephen Products.

In 2004, Stegner and Bumbaris opened their own restaurant together, named the Prairie Grass Cafe in Northbrook, Illinois. Stegner launched a second restaurant, Prairie Fire, in 2010. This saw a return to downtown Chicago, for Stegner, who ran it as a casual dining establishment. Outside of the professional kitchen, she also shows students at Northbrook Junior High School how to prepare healthy food, and praised Michelle Obama's work when she launched a similar nationwide campaign in 2011.

== Personal life ==
Stegner is married to Rohit Nambiar, and they have a daughter.
