= Alan Richman =

American journalist and food writer

- Born: January 25, 1944 (age 82)
- Education: University of Pennsylvania
- Occupations: Journalist, food writer

Alan Richman (born January 25, 1944) is an American journalist and food writer. He was a food correspondent for GQ magazine, and has won 16 James Beard Foundation Awards for journalism.

== Early life and education ==
Richman is a graduate of the General Honors Program at the University of Pennsylvania. He was a cadet in the Army ROTC, rose to the rank of captain on active duty and served two tours in the United States Army, including one in South Vietnam, for which he was awarded the Bronze Star. He also served in the earlier U.S. invasion and occupation of the Dominican Republic.

== Career ==
Richman began his career as a sportswriter in Philadelphia in the 1970s, covering the 76ers for the Philadelphia Evening Bulletin. He later worked as a sports columnist and, using a pseudonym, as restaurant critic for the Montreal Star. Richman began writing for GQ in 1986.

Richman has won 16 James Beard Foundation Journalism Awards for excellence in culinary writing, including two in 2009 for Magazine Feature Writing Without Recipes and Writing on Spirits, Wine, or Beer. He won a National Magazine Award in 1995 for three articles that appeared in GQ.

In 2004, HarperCollins published Fork It Over: The Intrepid Adventures of a Professional Eater, a collection of Richman's essays about food and dining.

Richman served as the dean of food journalism at the French Culinary Institute in New York City, teaching "The Craft of Food Writing".

In 2006, Richman caused a controversy after criticizing the cuisine of New Orleans and questioning the existence of the Creole ethnicity.

In 2009, celebrity chefs David Chang and Anthony Bourdain criticized Richman for "his insistence that celebrity chefs actually cook in their own restaurants." Bourdain's 2010 book, Medium Raw: A Bloody Valentine to the World of Food and the People Who Cook, contains a chapter entitled "Alan Richman Is a Douchebag" expounding on his view of Richman. In the same chapter Bourdain also said, Alan Richman is so loathsome he lacks "the gravitas required to be called an asshole".
