= Elizabeth Terry =

- Born: Elizabeth Bennett; 1942 or 1943 (age 82–83); Salem, Ohio
- Spouse: Michael H. Terry (deceased)
- Culinary career
- Cooking style: Cuisine of the Southern United States
- Ratings: Michelin stars; AAA Motor Club; Mobil; Good Food Guide
- Current restaurant: Elizabeth on 37th
- Award won: James Beard Foundation Award for Best Chef Southeast (1995)

Elizabeth Terry (née Bennett, born c. 1943) is an American chef who was best known as owner and head chef of the Elizabeth on 37th restaurant in Savannah, Georgia.

== Early life and education ==
Elizabeth Terry was born in Salem, Ohio, the first of six children of Gordon Flagg and Nanee Gibbs Bennett. She remembers the influence her grandmother's Louisiana home cooking from when she was child. Terry graduated with a degree in psychology from Lake Erie College in 1966. There, she met her future husband, Michael H. Terry, who was attending neighboring Kenyon College. They married in 1966, and moved to Cambridge, Massachusetts, while Michael studied at Harvard University.

== Career ==
Terry's first jobs before college had been selling bridal clothes and dressmaking in a fabric store. While her husband pursued his studies, she obtained jobs as a probation officer and lab assistant. Following his graduation, they moved to Atlanta, where their first daughter was born. With her husband's encouragement to find something new to do, Terry began working in a cheese and wine shop, then ran her own lunch shop called Thyme For You. They travelled through France on six occasions, where Terry picked up cooking techniques from many chefs. In 1980, they moved to Savannah where she planned to open a sandwich shop. This eventually became a restaurant housed on the ground floor of a mansion built in 1900, while the family (now including a second daughter) lived upstairs. The restaurant, Elizabeth on 37th, opened on May 14, 1981. She had researched historical recipes from families living in the local area at the Georgia Historical Society.

The year after opening, Atlanta Magazine described the restaurant as "the finest restaurant anywhere in coastal Georgia." It won several awards, including the 1995 James Beard Foundation Award for Best Chef Southeast, "in part because she [had] redefined Southern cuisine for the '90s". Terry was featured in magazines including Food & Wine, Lear's, and Delta Air Lines SKY magazine. In 1996, she wrote the cookbook Savannah Seasons with her daughter Alexis. Some of her recipes had previously been published in newspapers, and one, for boned shad, was included in a book by Craig Claiborne after she had cooked it for him in 1987. In 1998, the Terrys entered into a business partnership with brothers, and longterm employees, Gary and Greg Butch. In the early 2000s, Terry was a visiting chef at cooking demonstrations in New York and at the Kellogg Center, Michigan State University. By 2005, Terry had retired, and the Butch brothers continued to run Elizabeth on 37th, using some of Terry's old recipes. Following the death of her husband in 2012, Terry moved to live near her daughter on the West Coast.

== Awards ==
- 1995 - James Beard Foundation Award for Best Chef Southeast
- 2005 - Barbara Tropp President's Award, Women Chefs & Restaurateurs
