= Joyce Goldstein =

American chef (born 1935)

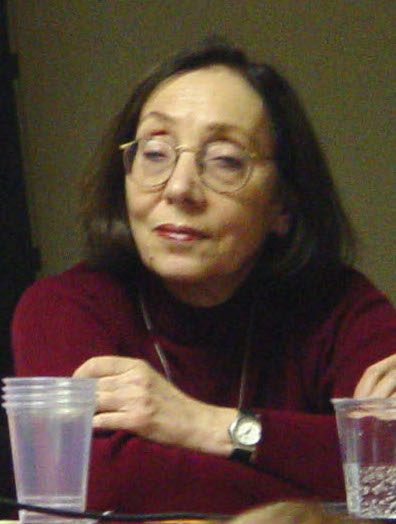
- Joyce Goldstein in 2006
- Born: July 17, 1935 (age 89)
- Culinary career
- Cooking style: Jewish; Mediterranean
- Previous restaurant(s): Square One (1984-1996)
- Award(s) won: 1993 James Beard Foundation Award General; 1994 James Beard Foundation Award Best Chef California
- Website: joycegoldstein.com

Joyce Goldstein (born July 17, 1935) is an American chef and two-time James Beard Foundation Award winner. She ran the influential San Francisco-based restaurant Square One between 1984 and 1996.

== Career ==
Joyce Goldstein worked as executive chef at the cafe within Chez Panisse for three years. She was the founder of the first international cooking school in San Francisco, California Street Cooking School. As well as working as a chef, she taught kitchen design at the University of California. Her first cookbook, The Mediterranean Kitchen, was published in 1989. She has since written cookbooks on Mediterranean and Jewish cuisines.

Goldstein ran her restaurant Square One in San Francisco between 1984 and 1996. While there, she had a daily changing menu of Mediterranean cuisine and had an influence on the restaurant scene in the city. To celebrate Goldstein's 80th birthday in 2015, the team from Square One reformed for a single night's service.

Goldstein is also the author of Inside the California Food Revolution: Thirty Years That Changed Our Culinary Consciousness that details the emergence of California chefs, wine, produce, restaurant design, and dining experiences that set the stage for today's food culture.

=== Awards ===
Goldstein was added to the James Beard Foundation Awards Who's Who of Food & Beverage in America in 1985. She was then nominated for specific awards on several more occasions, winning twice: first in 1993 in the General book category for Back to Square One: Old World Food in a New World Kitchen, and then again the following year for Best Chef California.
