= Sally Schneider =

Sally Schneider is an American journalist and founding editor of the website 'the improvised life'. A former chef, Schneider is author of The Improvisational Cook, A New Way to Cook and The Art of Low Calorie Cooking. She has won numerous awards including four James Beard Foundation Awards for her books and journalism. A New Way to Cook was named “One of the Best Food Books of the Decade” by the Guardian. She is a columnist for The Atlantic Monthly Food Blog as well as a radio commentator for the national public radio show "The Splendid Table".

== Career ==
Schneider has worked as a journalist, editor, teacher, food stylist, lecturer, and small-space consultant. She began her career in food working in restaurants in the 1970s. As a captain at the Sign of the Dove, she was one of the first women to work in elite Manhattan restaurants that had long held a men-only hiring policy, a policy that changed with the loss of a suit brought by the American Civil Liberties Union. Preferring cooking to service, and with no professional culinary training, Schneider started working in New York City restaurant kitchens, including The Soho Charcuterie and Le Petit Robert, eventually becoming a chef. For several years, she ran her own catering business. Later, she worked in food styling and magazine writing.

A brief stint as Associate Food Editor at a diet and health magazine was the catalyst for Schneider's eventual focus on a new approach to healthy cooking; it embraced the traditional taboos of butter, cream, goosefat, and other rich fats, used in moderation, with innovative cooking techniques. She developed these ideas in her long-running Food & Wine Magazine column “Well-Being” and her ground-breaking tome “A New Way to Cook”. This book also launched a central theme in Schneider's work, that of improvising. She developed new ways of writing recipes to incorporate information and ideas that would encourage people to improvise on the basic theme. Her 2001 award-winning cookbook The Improvisational Cook explored this concept more fully, with chapters on The Creative Mindset, Accidents and the Unexpected, Understanding Flavor, Learning What Goes with What, Making Flavors Come to Life: Salt and Other Absolutely Essential Seasonings and The Essential Pantry: Long-Keeping Ingredients as Opportunity.

As a food stylist, Schneider worked with such notable photographers as Irving Penn, Hiro, Annie Leibovitz and Maria Robledo. She once wrangled 600 live snails for the photographer Irving Penn for a photograph that is in the Museum of Modern Art.

One of Schneider's most curious works, a collaborative artist's book project printed in limited edition by A.S.C. Rower's Flockophobic Press, is The Onion As It Is Cooked, a poem by Steven "Jesse" Bernstein impressed into a sheet of saffron pasta. It has been collected by notable rare book collections including The Yale's Beineke Rare Book and Manuscript Library, MOMA and the Victoria & Albert Museum.

Schneider’s A New Way To Cook (2001) received a starred review from Publishers Weekly, which wrote that "Every era must have its cookbook, and the cookbook for the early 21st century has arrived." In a story on her The Improvisational Cook (2006), Amy Sherman of KQED wrote that "Just as in jazz, the best improvisations come from the best musicians and Schneider is an accomplished cook who you can trust and will in all likelihood inspire you as well."

In 2009, Schneider launched ‘the improvised life’, a lifestyle blog about improvising as a daily practice. It aims to inspire readers to “create, design, be resourceful, make it up as you go along”. Manhattan User's Guide called it “a zeitgeist-perfect blog”. Her daily blogs focus on the messy and chaotic aspects of life. The major theme of Schneider's work is focusing on building cost effective and resourceful lifestyles
