= Steven Jenkins =

English cricketer

Personal information
- Full name: Steven Paul Jenkins
- Born: 30 May 1978 (age 48); Taunton, Somerset, England
- Batting: Right-handed
- Role: Wicketkeeper

Domestic team information
- Years: Team
- 1999-2000: Somerset Cricket Board

Career statistics
Competition	LA
Matches	2
Runs scored	58
Batting average	29.00
100s/50s	–/–
Top score	42
Balls bowled	–
Wickets	–
Bowling average	–
5 wickets in innings	–
10 wickets in match	–
Best bowling	–
Catches/stumpings	–/–
- Source: Cricinfo, 20 October 2010

Steven Paul Jenkins (born 30 May 1978) is an English cricketer. Jenkins is a right-handed batsman who plays primarily as a wicketkeeper. He was born at Taunton, Somerset.

Jenkins represented the Somerset Cricket Board in 2 List A matches against Bedfordshire in the 2nd round of the 1999 NatWest Trophy and Staffordshire in the 1st round of the 2000 NatWest Trophy. In his 2 List A matches, he scored 58 runs at a batting average of 29.00, with a high score of 42.

He currently plays club cricket for Taunton St Andrews Cricket Club in the West of England Premier League.
