= Habanada =

Heatless variety of habanero pepper

- Species: Capsicum chinense
- Cultivar: 'Habanada'
- Breeder: Michael Mazourek
- Origin: United States

Habanada is a heatless variety of habanero pepper (Capsicum chinense) bred by the plant breeder Michael Mazourek at Cornell University. It keeps the floral, fruity aroma of the habanero but has effectively no pungency, and has been described as the first heatless habanero.

== Development ==
The variety originated around 2001, when Mazourek, then a graduate student at Cornell, obtained seeds of a naturally heatless habanero that had arisen as a field mutation in New Mexico. Over more than a decade of crossing, selection and genetic analysis he stabilised a pepper that kept the habanero's aroma and flavour while removing its heat, releasing it as the Habanada around 2015.

== Description and use ==
Habanada pods resemble a small, elongated habanero and ripen to orange. They are described as aromatic and sweet, with melon and floral notes but without the burn of a typical habanero. The variety is distributed by Row 7 Seed Company, the seed business Mazourek co-founded in 2018 with the chef Dan Barber and the seedsman Matthew Goldfarb.
