= Honeynut squash =

Miniature winter squash

Cucurbita 'Honeynut'
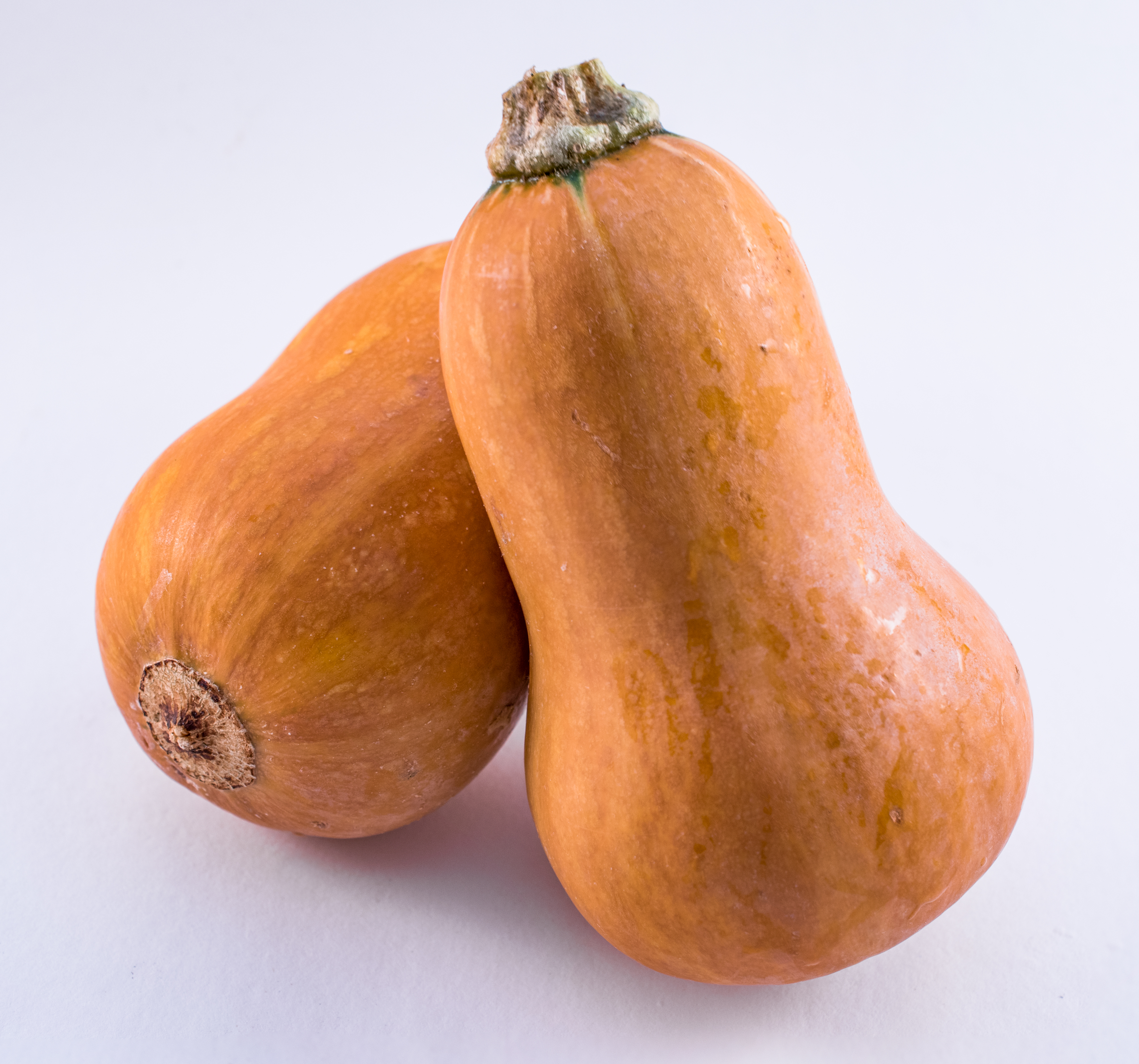
- Ripe honeynut squash
- Genus: Cucurbita
- Hybrid parentage: C. moschata × C. maxima
- Cultivar: 'Honeynut'
- Breeder: Michael Mazourek, Richard W. Robinson
- Origin: 1980s in Geneva, New York

Honeynut squash is a butternut winter squash cultivar. It has dark tan to orange skin with orange fleshy pulp. When ripe, it turns from green to a deep orange and becomes sweeter and richer. Honeynut squash has a similar shape and flavor to standard butternut squash but averages about half the size and is sweeter. It has two to three times more beta-carotene than standard butternut squash. Honeynut squash can be roasted, sautéed, puréed, added to soups, stews, and braises, and used in desserts.

The squash was developed by Michael Mazourek, a plant breeder and associate professor who joined Cornell University in 2008. In 2016 the variety entered USA national markets through Row 7 Seed Company. Mazourek received assistance from Dan Barber, chef and owner of Blue Hill and Blue Hill at Stone Barns in New York with whom he founded Row 7 Seed Company.

== Attributes ==
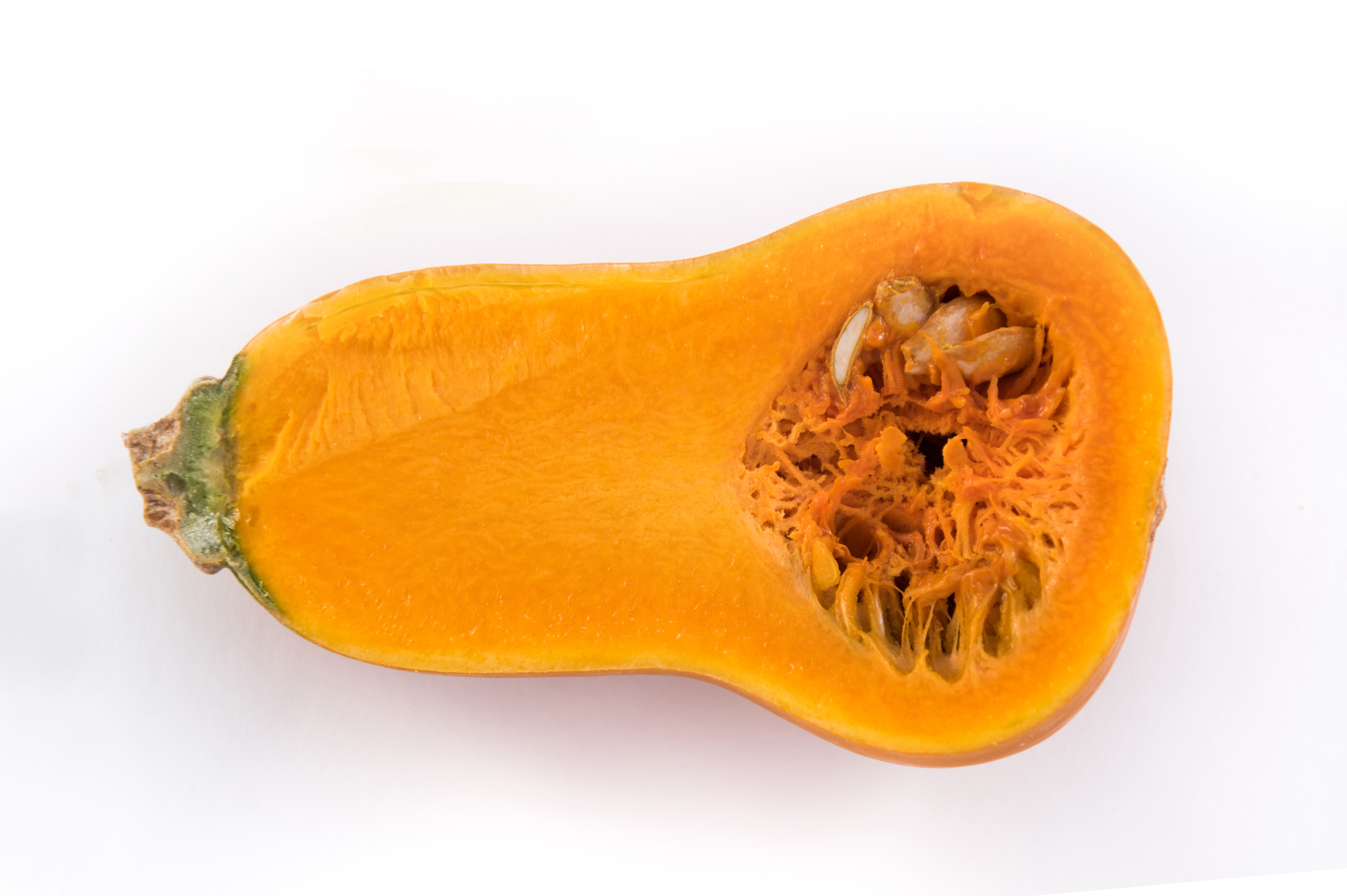
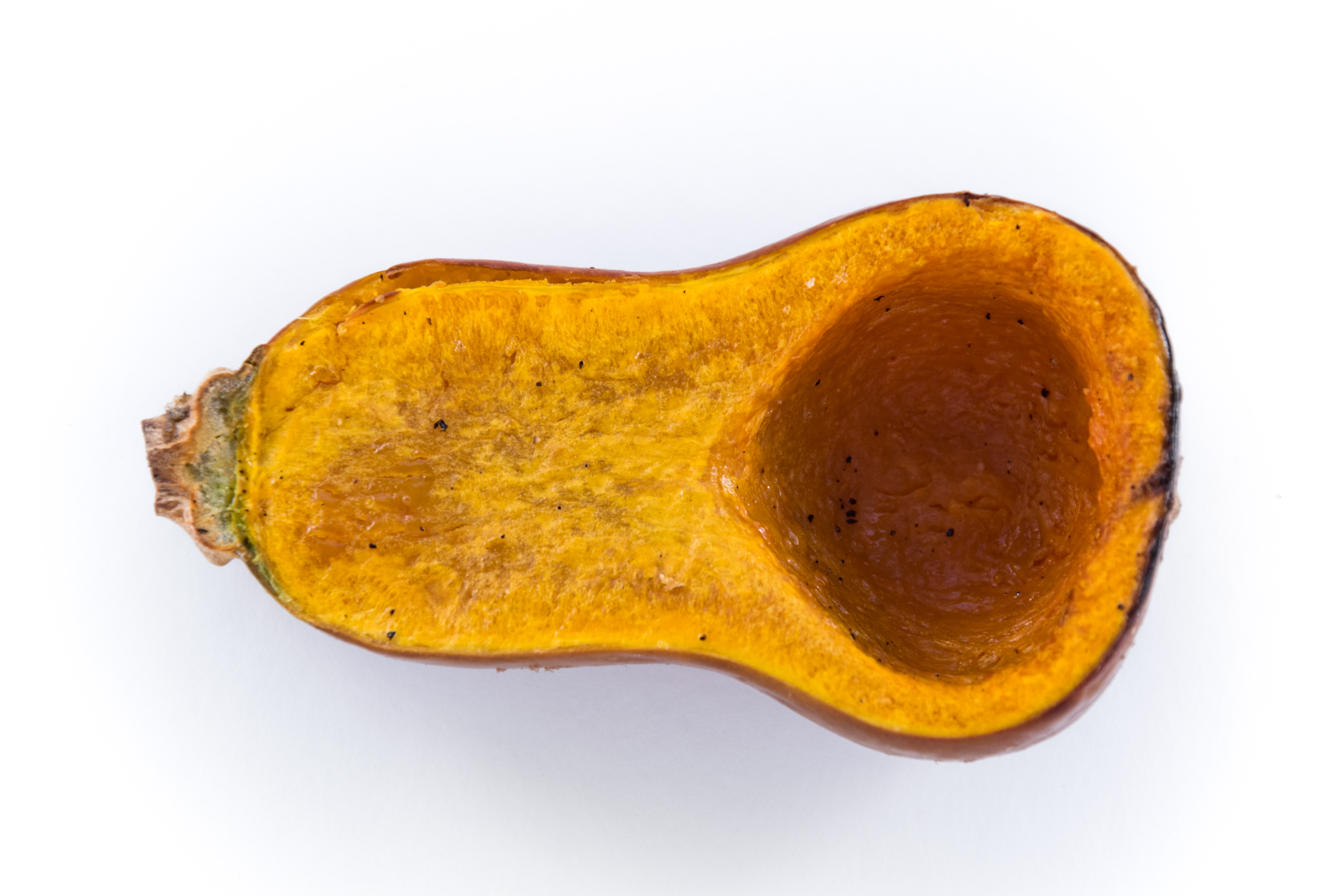
Cross-section of the fruit, raw and roasted

The honeynut squash is derived from a cross between the butternut (Cucurbita moschata) and buttercup (C. maxima) squashes. The squash has the butternut's traditional bell shape but is smaller, darker-fleshed and skinned, and has a smooth, thin, edible skin. The skin is dark tan to orange, also referred to as a "deep honey color". The color of the skin as well as the sweetness of the flesh is what gives the variety its name. One unusual feature bred into the squash is its color change as it ripens; unlike most squash, the honeynut is a deep green for most of its eight-week ripening process (resembling zucchini in color), and turns honey-colored on the vine in the last few weeks. The orange fleshy pulp is firm and moist with a smooth, even texture. There is a small seed cavity in the bulbous end, containing stringy pulp and flat, cream-colored seeds. The flavor is more prominent and sweeter than butternut squash, and similarly nut-like. The squash averages 2.5 to 4 inches (6.4 to 10.2 cm) in width, and 4 to 5 inches (10 to 13 cm) inches in length.

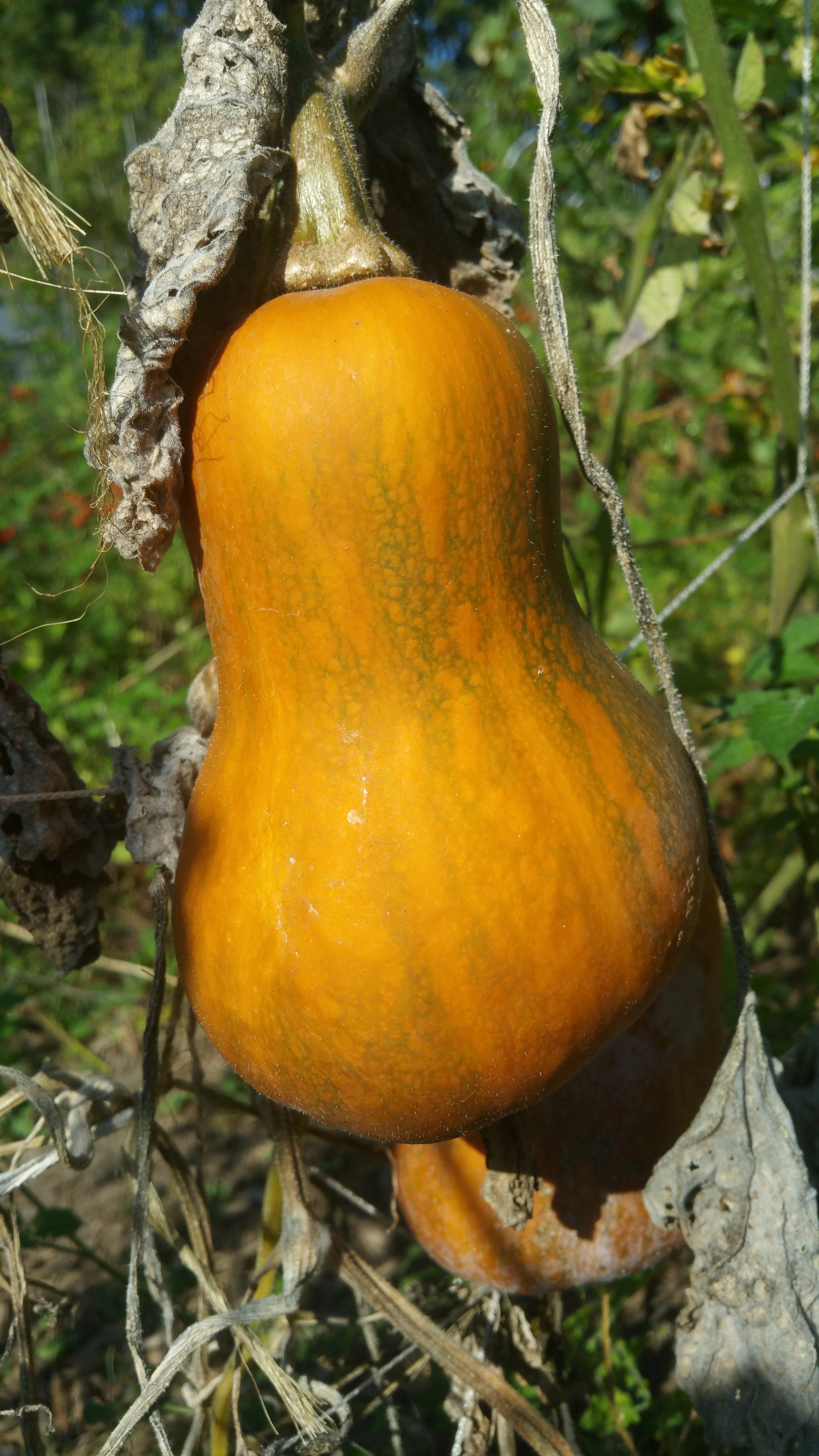
Partially ripe squash on the vine

The squash grow on a restricted vine that is self-fertile, taking about 105 to 110 days from seed to maturity. It is higher-yielding than traditional varieties. They are planted in May and harvested from late September through early October. They store well for about a month in a cool, dry place, and should be eaten as soon as they begin to wrinkle, as this indicates they are drying out. Due to their thin skin, this variety does not store as well as other winter squash like butternut, which can be stored successfully for two to three months. Honeynut squash has a variable shelf life once peeled or prepared; it can be refrigerated for up to one week, or frozen for up to three months.

=== Nutrition ===
Honeynut squash contains high amounts of vitamin A and beta-carotene; it has about two to three times the amount of beta-carotene as butternut squash. The squash is also a good source of B vitamins, and also contains calcium, copper, iron, phosphorus, potassium, and zinc.

== History ==
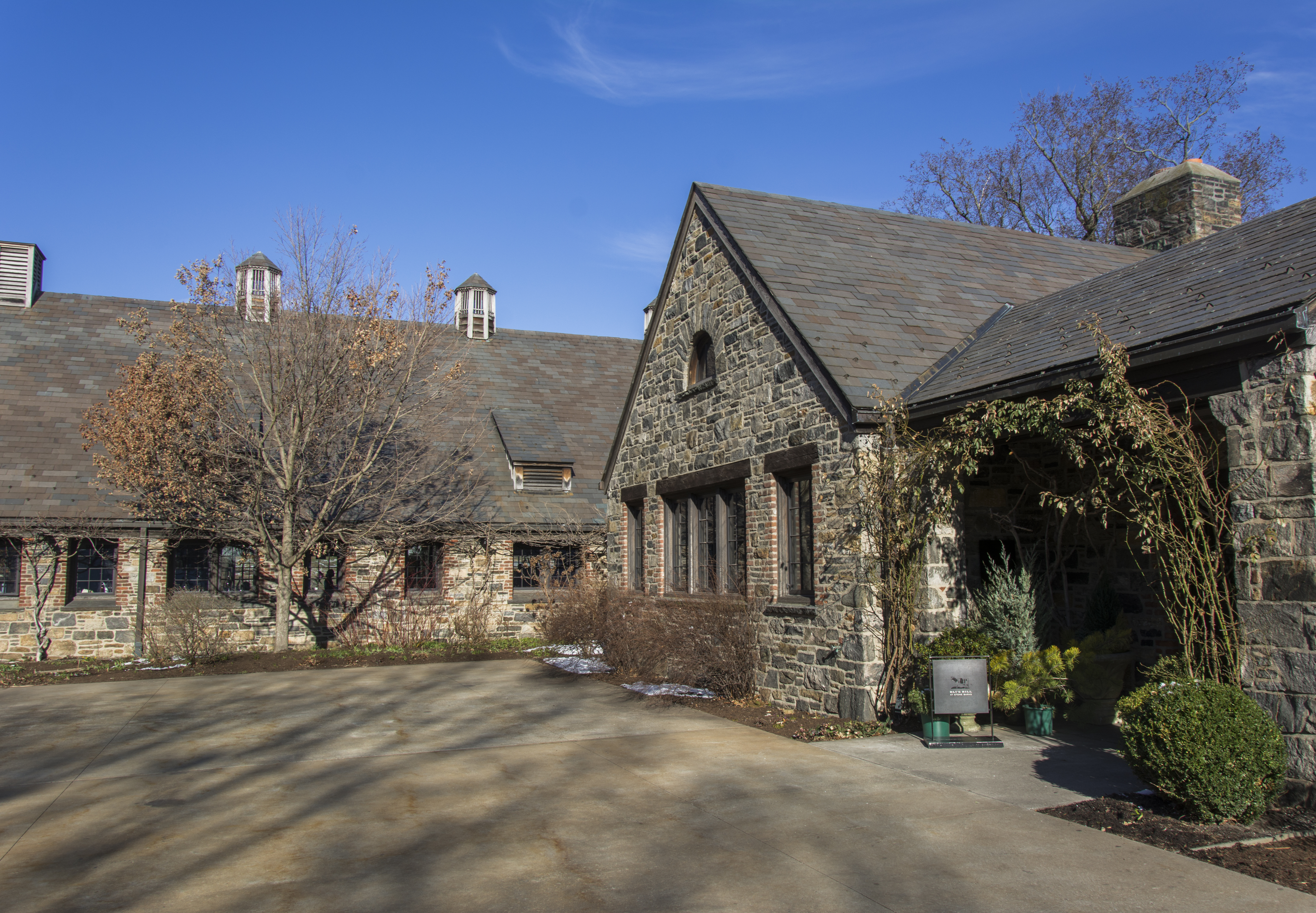
Blue Hill at Stone Barns

The squash originated in the 1980s in experiments by Richard W. Robinson, a Cornell University professor emeritus of horticulture. Robinson crossed a buttercup and butternut squash at the New York State Agricultural Experiment Station in Geneva, New York, though the original product never reached markets. In later years, Michael Mazourek was prompted to continue its development by his advisor, plant breeding professor Molly Jahn, who wanted to make Cornell University products available to consumers and seed companies. Mazourek refined Robinson's product through classical plant breeding (cross-pollination and selective breeding) after receiving feedback from growers, and collaborated with a local farmer in seed trials in 2006.

The Stone Barns Center for Food & Agriculture, a nonprofit farm and education center in Pocantico Hills, New York, hosted a group of Cornell plant breeders in 2009. There, farm director Jack Algier asked Dan Barber, chef and owner of Stone Barns' restaurant Blue Hill to cook the plant breeders' products for the group. After dinner, Barber took Michael Mazourek for a tour of the kitchen. At one point in the tour, Barber grabbed a butternut squash and asked Mazourek "If you're such a good breeder, why don't you make this thing taste good? Why don't you shrink the thing?!" Mazourek had been developing the honeynut squash for about a year by this time, but had not received positive responses from seed companies or farmers, and had never been asked to breed plants to optimize flavor. Smaller squash were seen as undesirable, and harder to market than similar, larger squash.

Developing the honeynut, Mazourek first cross-bred two similar squash, and planted the seeds of the cross-breed. Then he started selecting the best squash and highest-quality seeds, looking for more uniformity in color, size, and texture. Mazourek had Barber cook and taste the experimental squash, judging predominantly on flavor (rather than yield, a predominant concern for most agricultural products). Barber's roasting technique went hotter and longer than most cookbooks advised, caramelizing the squash, concentrating its flavor, and bringing out its sweetness. Mazourek had previously microwaved or steamed squash, which added water and diluted flavor, the standard technique used to test all new vegetable varieties at Cornell at the time.

With Mazourek's problem distributing the variety, Barber began promoting it at his Stone Barns restaurant, and presented the squash at the G9 Chef's Summit in 2013, an annual meeting between nine of the world's top chefs. René Redzepi and Massimo Bottura especially liked the product, but it then took about two and a half years to enter markets, doing so in 2015. In that year, the squash was popularized as part of Saveur 100, a list of new and trending foods, people, and restaurants by Saveur magazine. By around that time, half of the farms in the Northeast United States that grew squash also grew the honeynut variety; two years later in 2017 the percentage grew to about 90 percent. The squash subsequently was available at grocery stores and farmers' markets across the United States.

The discussion between Mazourek and Barber in 2009 also prompted them to create a seed company, along with Matthew Goldfarb. Their company, Row 7 Seed Company, sells similar gourds and other specially-bred seeds. Mazourek and Barber are now working on a smaller product, 898 Squash, which will have an extended season, higher yield, and a slightly thicker skin, allowing it to keep its quality in storage longer. The 898 is expected to take at least 5 years to develop.

== Culinary uses ==
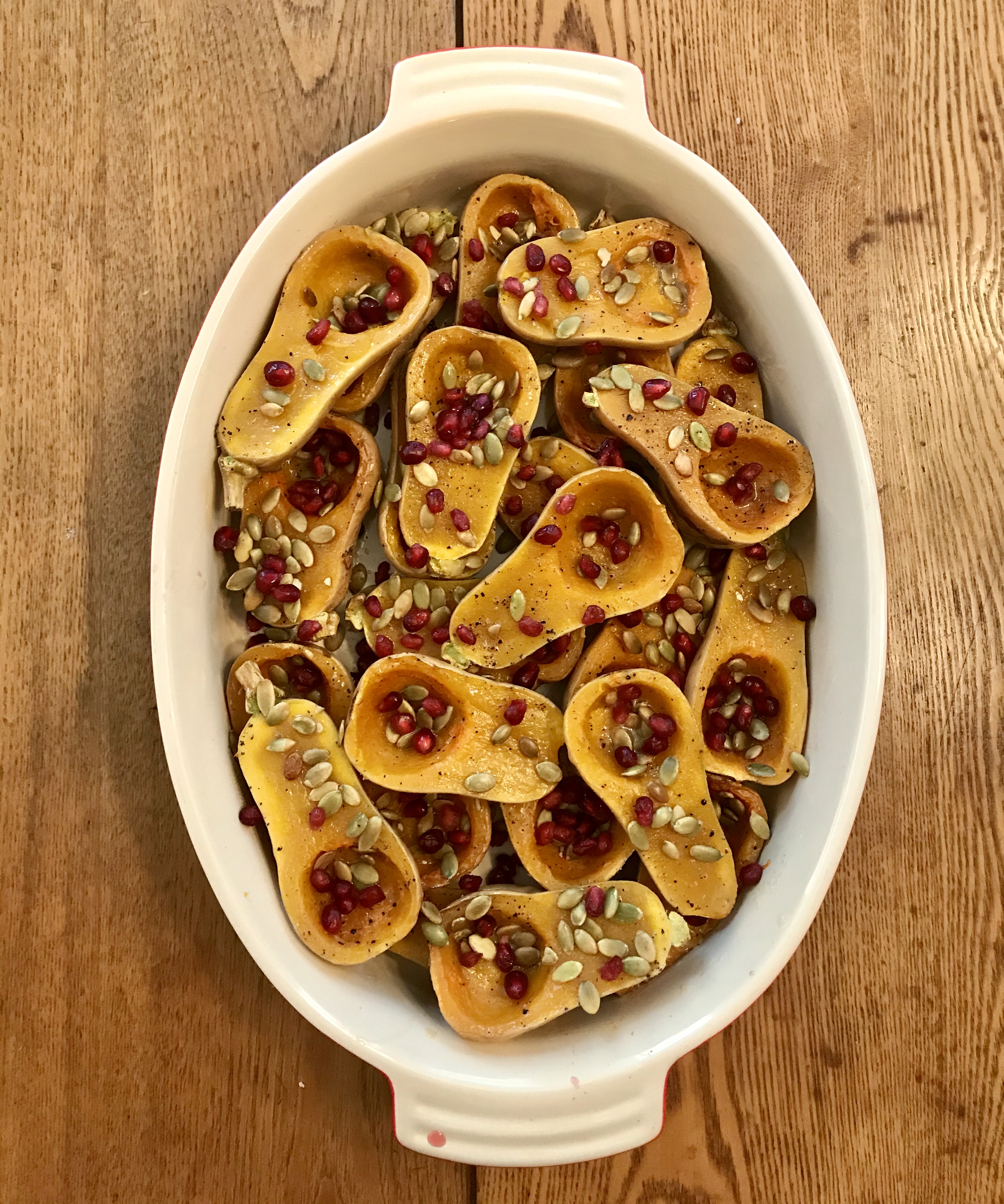
Roasted honeynut squash with pepitas and pomegranate seeds

The squash is ideal for roasting and stuffing and has enough sugar to be used for desserts. The squash is also suitable for baking, boiling, sautéing, mashing, puréeing, or adding to soups, stews, or braises. As well, the squash is suitable for most recipes calling for butternut or winter squash. When roasted at high heat, the squash's natural sugars caramelize, giving the squash a caramel flavor. The squash's skin is thin enough to be edible, and it is small enough for a single portion, making it easier and quicker to prepare than butternut squash.
