= Michael Mazourek =

American plant breeder and professor

Michael R. Mazourek
- Occupation: Plant breeder

Michael R. Mazourek is a plant breeder and associate professor at Cornell University notable for developing the honeynut squash, a cultivar of a cross first developed by Cornell University plant breeder Richard W. Robinson, creating the Habanada, and Row 7 Seed Company, a seed company co-founded with Dan Barber of Blue Hill and Matthew Goldfarb.

== Biography ==
Mazourek attended Cornell University to study pepper biochemical genetics and through his work with Molly Jahn and Henry Munger became interested in plant breeding. Mazourek earned his PhD from Cornell in 2008.

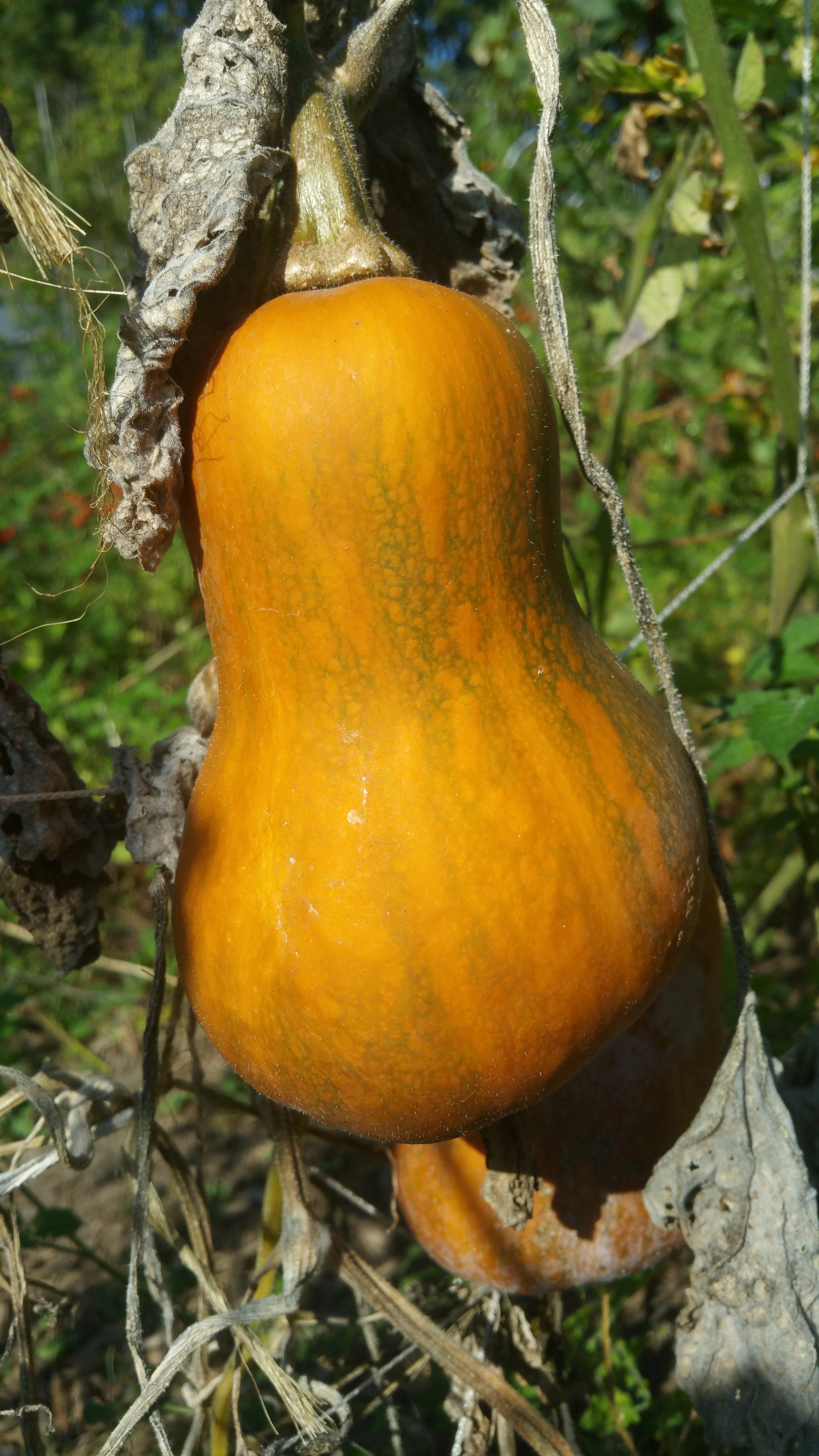
Ripening honeynut squash

Mazourek is a public breeder who works on breeding for quality and disease resistance in peppers, peas and cucurbit crops. Notably, he has bred the honeynut squash and is working on breeding a cucumber that resists downy mildew. To breed crops, he uses recurrent selection, crossing two plants that exhibit certain qualities to mix in diversity, with the final resulting plant having locked in traits of its parents. He licenses his breeds out to seed companies with a portion of the revenue going back to the lab.

In 2018, Mazourek founded Row 7 Seed Company with chef Dan Barber and seedsman Matthew Goldfarb, with the goal to connect breeders with chefs.

=== Honeynut Squash ===
As an assistant professor in Plant Breeding and Genetics at Cornell, Mazourek was improving Cornell's mini butternut squash but was having trouble selling the new breed to seed companies. In 2009, he met chef Dan Barber at a meal at Blue Hill at Stone Barns. During a kitchen tour, Barber showed Mazourek how they were cooking butternut squash to maximize a concentrated flavor. Working closely with Barber, Mazourek re-released an improved Honeynut and continued to advance storage and yield in next generation mini's like Brûlée butternut squash which challenge the misconception that plant breeders have to choose between flavor and yield.
