= Sushi Ichimura =

Japanese restaurant in New York City

- Interactive map of Sushi Ichimura

Restaurant information
- Established: June 20, 2023
- Closed: 2025
- Head chef: Eiji Ichimura
- Food type: Japanese
- Location: 412 Greenwich Street, New York City, New York, 10013, United States
- Coordinates: 40°43′19″N 74°00′36″W
- Website: www.sushiichimura.nyc

Sushi Ichimura was a Michelin-starred sushi restaurant in New York City. The restaurant opened on June 20, 2023. The head sushi chef Eiji Ichimura previously worked at several other now closed Michelin starred restaurants; Bar Uchū, Ichimura at Brushstroke, and Ichimura at Uchū. The restaurant closed in 2025; Muku opened at the same location later in the year.

== See also ==
- List of Japanese restaurants
- List of Michelin-starred restaurants in New York City
- List of sushi restaurants
