= Ichimura at Uchū =

Japanese restaurant in New York City

- Interactive map of Ichimura at Uchū

Restaurant information
- Established: September 2017
- Closed: December 30, 2021
- Manager: Derek Feldman
- Head chef: Eiji Ichimura
- Food type: Japanese
- Rating: Michelin Guide 2019–2021
- Location: 217 Eldridge St., New York, NY, 10002, New York City, New York, 10002, United States
- Coordinates: 40°43′18.3″N 73°59′25″W
- Website: www.sushiichimura.nyc

Ichimura at Uchū was a Japanese omakase restaurant located on Eldridge Street on the Lower East Side of Manhattan in New York City which received 2 Michelin Stars in 2019. The restaurant was a traditional, or edomae style, omakase with 21 courses for $300. The restaurant was run by Tokyo-trained Eiji Ichimura and was the front space within Bar Uchū, another 1 Michelin star restaurant; as well as at the previous closed 1-star Ichimura at Brushstroke. The chef afterwards moved to establish another restaurant Sushi Ichimura which has since also received 1 Michelin star. The restaurant, along with Uchu, closed in 2021 due to rent increases having maintained their 2-star status each year before closing.

== See also ==
- List of Japanese restaurants
- List of Michelin-starred restaurants in New York City
- List of sushi restaurants
