= Kurt Gutenbrunner =

Austrian chef

- Born: Wallsee-Sindelburg, Austria
- Occupations: Chef, restaurateur
- Culinary career
- Cooking style: Austrian, Central European
- Current restaurants: Wallsé; Wallsé Next Door
- Award won: Michelin Star
- Website: wallse.com

Kurt Gutenbrunner is an Austrian chef, cookbook author, and Austrian cuisine restaurateur in New York City. He owns and operates Wallsé, an Austrian restaurant located in the West Village.

== Career ==
In the mid 1980s, Gutenbrunner worked for two years at Tantris in Munich. He was introduced to Herman Reiner, a chef at Windows on the World who subsequently hired him as a sous chef.

In 1990, he started working at Bouley, and developed a working relationship with chef David Bouley for the next 10 years.

In 2000, he opened Wallsé in the West Village. The restaurant received a Michelin Star in the Michelin Guide's inaugural NY edition and retained its status until 2021. It lost its Michelin star in 2022.

In 2005, he opened Blaue Gans in Tribeca. It closed in 2018.

In 2015, he reopened The Upholstery Store (originally "The Upholstery Wine Bar") in the West Village. In 2021, Upholstery would be renamed to Wallsé Next Door.

In 2022, he opened Charley, a Viennese bistro in Harrison, New Jersey.

== Private Life ==
Since 2012 he´s married to the former Anchor Lady from ORF-Magazine Eco Angelika Ahrens and is giving some diet-advices with her.

== Bibliography ==
- Neue Cuisine, The Elegant Tastes of Vienna With Jane Sigal. Rizzoli Books and Random House ISBN 978-0-8478-3562-1 (2011)
