= 63 Clinton =

Restaurant in New York City

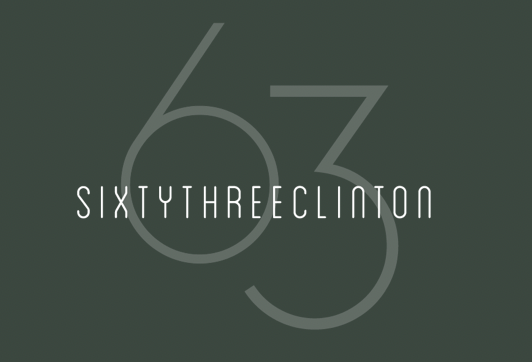

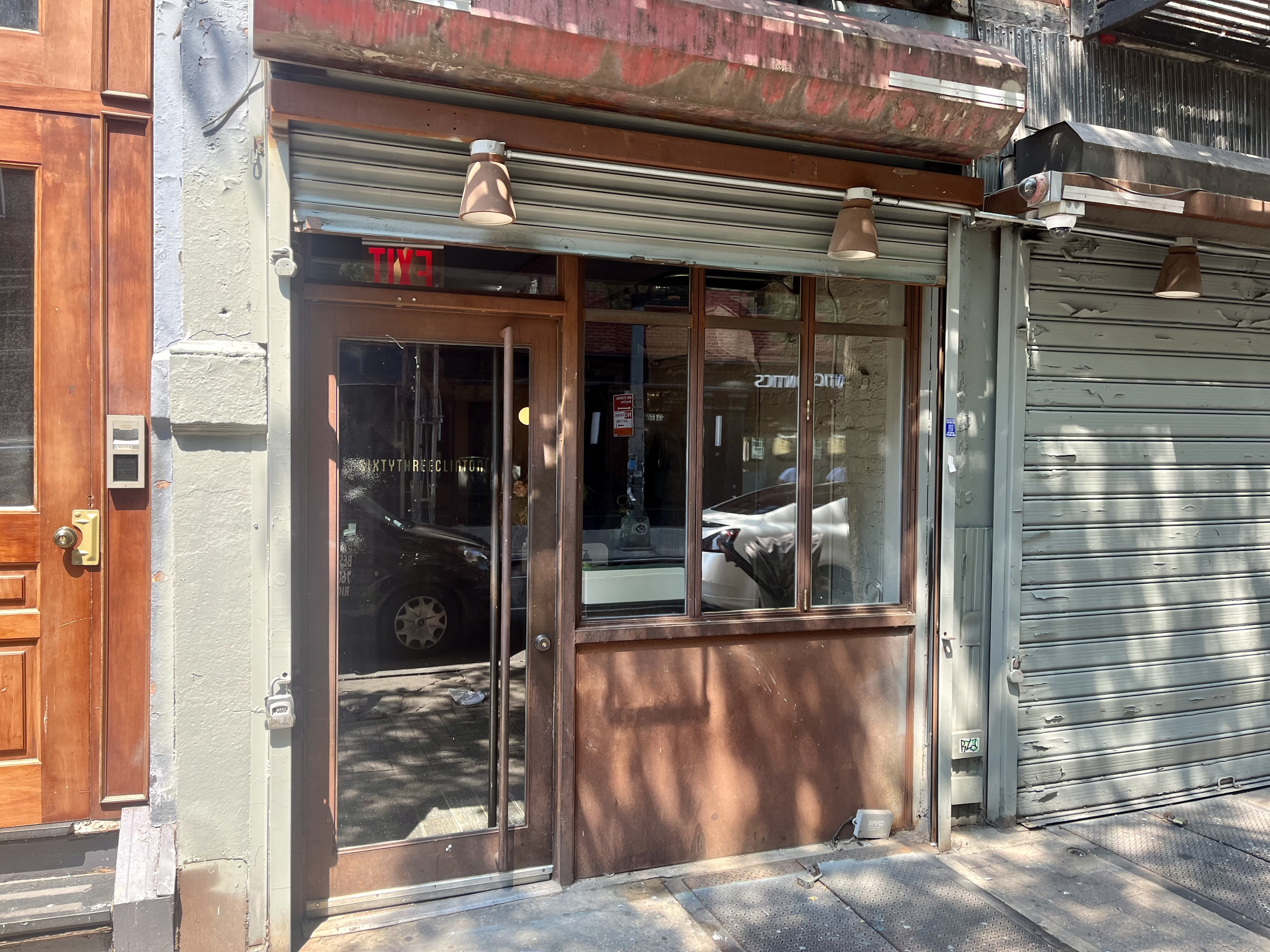
- The restaurant's exterior in 2024
- Interactive map of 63 Clinton

Restaurant information
- Established: July 2021
- Owners: Sam Clonts and Raymond Trinh
- Head chef: Sam Clonts
- Chef: Raymond Trinh
- Food type: American food with global influences
- Rating: (Michelin Guide)
- Location: 63 Clinton Street, New York City, New York, 10002, United States
- Coordinates: 40°43′10″N 73°59′6.1″W
- Seating capacity: 10 (bar,) 40 (main room)
- Reservations: Required
- Website: Official website

63 Clinton (sometimes Sixty Three Clinton) is a restaurant in New York City on the Lower East Side. The two chefs behind the restaurant, Sam Clonts and Raymond Trinh used to work at Bar Uchū. The seasonal American cuisine menu with global influences solely consists of a 7-course seasonal tasting menu with an optional extra caviar hand roll with the one dish common amongst all seasons being the breakfast taco with an ajitama egg, salsa verde, and trout roe. The restaurant has received a Michelin star.

== See also ==
- List of Michelin-starred restaurants in New York City
