= Wallsé =

Restaurant serving Austrian cuisine in New York City

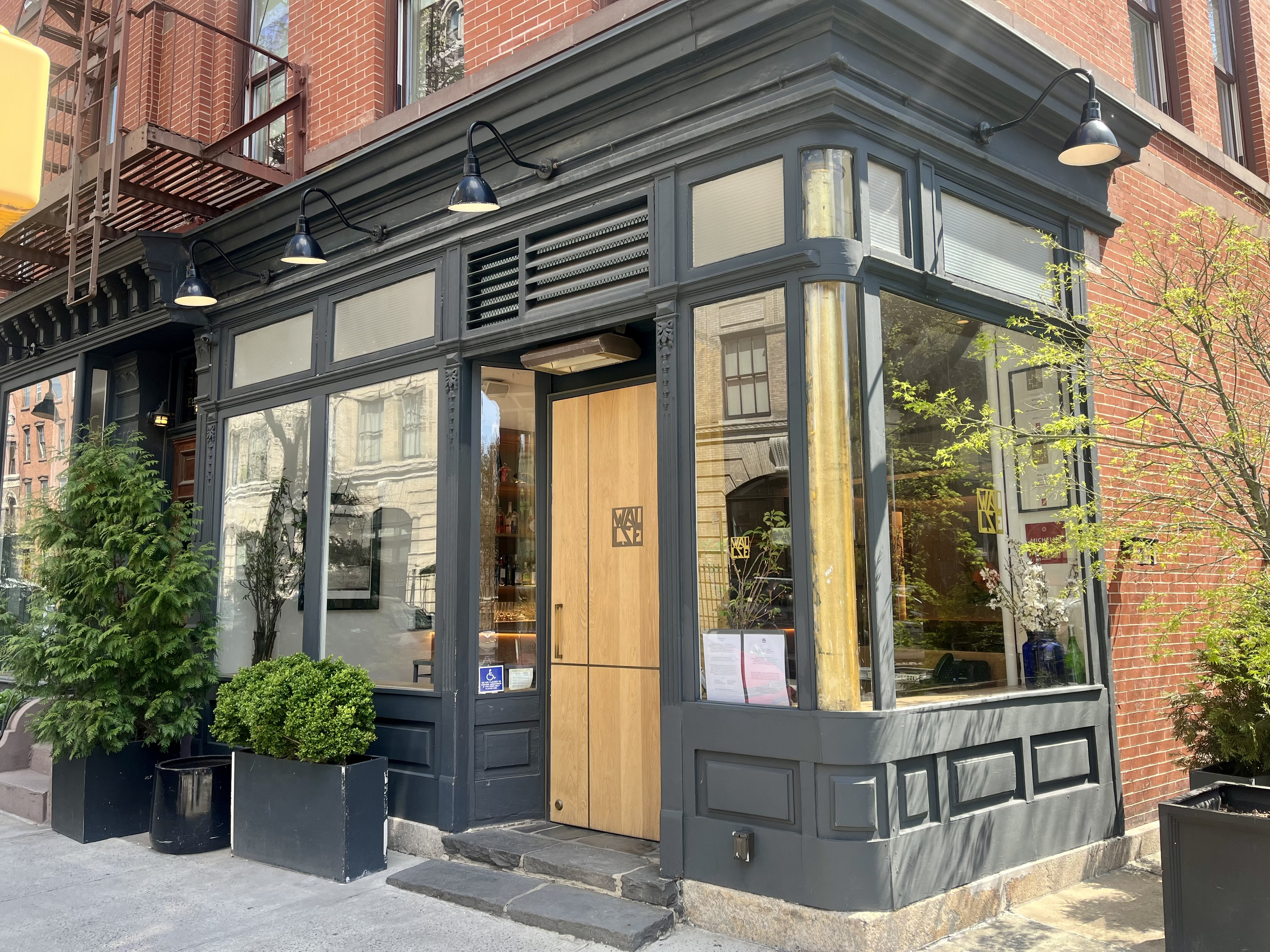
- Wallsé in April 2024
- Interactive map of Wallsé

Restaurant information
- Established: 2000
- Chef: Kurt Gutenbrunner
- Food type: Austrian Cuisine, European Cuisine
- Location: 344 West 11th Street, New York City, New York, 10014, United States
- Coordinates: 40°44′7.5″N 74°0′29.5″W
- Reservations: Resy
- Website: wallse.com

Wallsé is a restaurant in New York City. The restaurant serves Austrian cuisine.

== History ==
Kurt Gutenbrunner opened Wallsé in 2000. Before opening Wallsé, Gutenbrunner was the executive chef at Bouley. In 2011, Gutenbrunner told Eater that a living fish was stolen from the vase in which it lived in Wallsé's bathroom. The culprit was never identified. Wallsè Next Door, a smaller "sister" location, is near Wallsé.

The restaurant uses chairs made by Thonet. A portrait of Gutenbrunner by Julian Schnabel hangs in the restaurant.

== Reviews and accolades ==
=== Reviews ===
The restaurant received a positive review from Amanda Hesser, published in The New York Times, in 2004, awarding the restaurant two out of four possible stars. Hesser praised the restaurant as "assured and unfettered". Hesser also praised its "neighborhood demeanor" and Gutenbrunner's resistance to using ingredients such as "foam" and "powdered kumquat" and the techniques of chefs such as Ferran Adrià and Thomas Keller.

In 2017 Pete Wells gave the restaurant a positive review, also published in The New York Times. He awarded the restaurant one of four possible stars, a rating of "Good". Wells contrasted his visits to the restaurant to write the review unfavorably to his past experiences, but noted that it "wouldn’t take much to pull the lines taut". Wells praised the restaurant's "Old World charm and grown-up civility".

=== Accolades ===
The restaurant had a single Michelin star, which it was first awarded in 2006, and which it lost in 2022.

== See also ==
- List of Michelin-starred restaurants in New York City
