= Dan Barber =

American chef

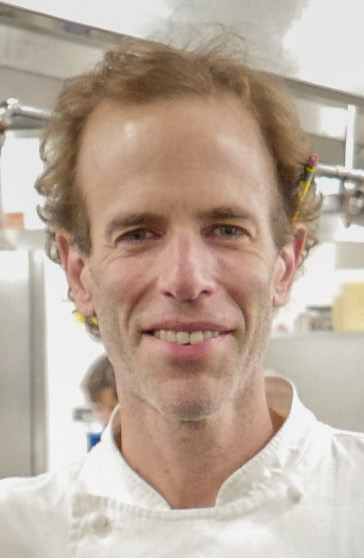
- Born: October 2, 1969 (age 56); New York City, New York, U.S.
- Education: French Culinary Institute; Tufts University
- Spouse: Aria Beth Sloss
- Children: 2
- Culinary career
- Cooking style: Farm-to-table, ethical eating
- Current restaurant(s): Blue Hill Blue Hill at Stone Barns
- Previous restaurant(s): Bouley (New York City) Chez Panisse (Berkeley, California) Campanile (Los Angeles) La Brea Bakery (Los Angeles)
- Award(s) won: Food & Wine 2002 Best New Chef – Blue Hill James Beard 2006 Best Chef: New York City James Beard 2008 Who's Who of Food and Beverage in America Time 100 2009 Most Influential James Beard 2009 Outstanding Chef Award James Beard 2015 Writing and Literature Award James Beard 2017 Leadership Award
- Website: www.bluehillfarm.com/food/overview/team/dan-barber

Dan Barber (born October 2, 1969) is the chef and co-owner of Family Meal at Blue Hill in Manhattan and Blue Hill at Stone Barns in Pocantico Hills, New York, United States. He is the author of The Third Plate: Field Notes on the Future of Food.

== Education ==
He is a 1992 graduate of Tufts University, where he received a B.A. in English and a graduate of the French Culinary Institute.

== Career ==
Barber operates Family Meal at Blue Hill in Manhattan and Blue Hill at Stone Barns in Pocantico Hills, New York.

Around 2009, Barber was involved in developing a miniature butternut squash. Together with Michael Mazourek, they created the honeynut squash. The two later created and operate Row 7 Seed Company, a seed company selling similar gourds and other specially-bred seeds.

In 2014, he published The Third Plate: Field Notes On the Future of Food in which he describes the development of mankind via food in four episodes: "Soil", "Land", "Sea" and "Seeds".

In May 2020, due to the COVID-19 pandemic, Barber launched the resourcED program at both Blue Hill restaurants, which packaged ingredients from the Stone Barns farm and included directions for customers to cook themselves. The boxes were intended to keep the restaurants and their suppliers in business when they couldn't host diners.

In August 2020, Barber announced he would be stepping down from the kitchen of Blue Hill at Stone Barns and Blue Hill in Greenwich Village. The change was anticipated to happen in 2021, with the kitchens being led with a diversity-focused chef-in-residence concept. The new concept was a response to the Black Lives Matter protests bringing attention to structural inequities in the restaurant industry. As of 2022, Barber has returned to cooking at Blue Hill at Stone Barns.

A 2022 Eater article alleged that Barber's Blue Hill at Stone Barns restaurant has a history of abuse toward its employees, a toxic work environment, and other issues, with a focus on Barber being ignorant of an employee's report of sexual assault. Through crisis & reputation management firm Trident DMG, as well as defamation law firm Clare Locke, Blue Hill denied all allegations.

== Recognition ==
In 2002, Barber was named one of the Best New Chefs by Food & Wine. He has received several James Beard Foundation awards, including the 2006 award for Best Chef: New York City and the 2009 award for Outstanding Chef. The James Beard Foundation also named him the top chef in America in 2009. Also in 2009, he was named one of the world's most influential people in Time magazine's annual Time 100.

Barber was appointed by the President of the United States Barack Obama to serve on the President's Council on Fitness, Sports and Nutrition and is also a member of the advisory board to the Harvard Medical School Center for Health and the Global Environment. Barber was featured in episode two of the first season of Netflix's Chef's Table series in 2015.

== Approach to cuisine ==
Barber was mentored by notable California cuisine chefs, Mark Peel at Campanile in Los Angeles and Alice Waters at Chez Panisse in Berkeley. He has written on food and agricultural policies in The New York Times, Gourmet, The Nation, Saveur, and Food & Wine.

In 2008 he gave a TED talk on foie gras produced without force-feeding on a farm in Spain which he describes as a "Garden of Eden".

In 2010, Barber gave a talk at the TED Conference, where he outlined his discovery of extensively farmed fish at Veta La Palma, Spain. He spoke about how ecological and sustainable farm systems affect the flavor of agricultural products.

== Personal life ==
He is married to Aria Beth Sloss, with whom he has two daughters.
