= Muku (restaurant) =

Restaurant in New York City

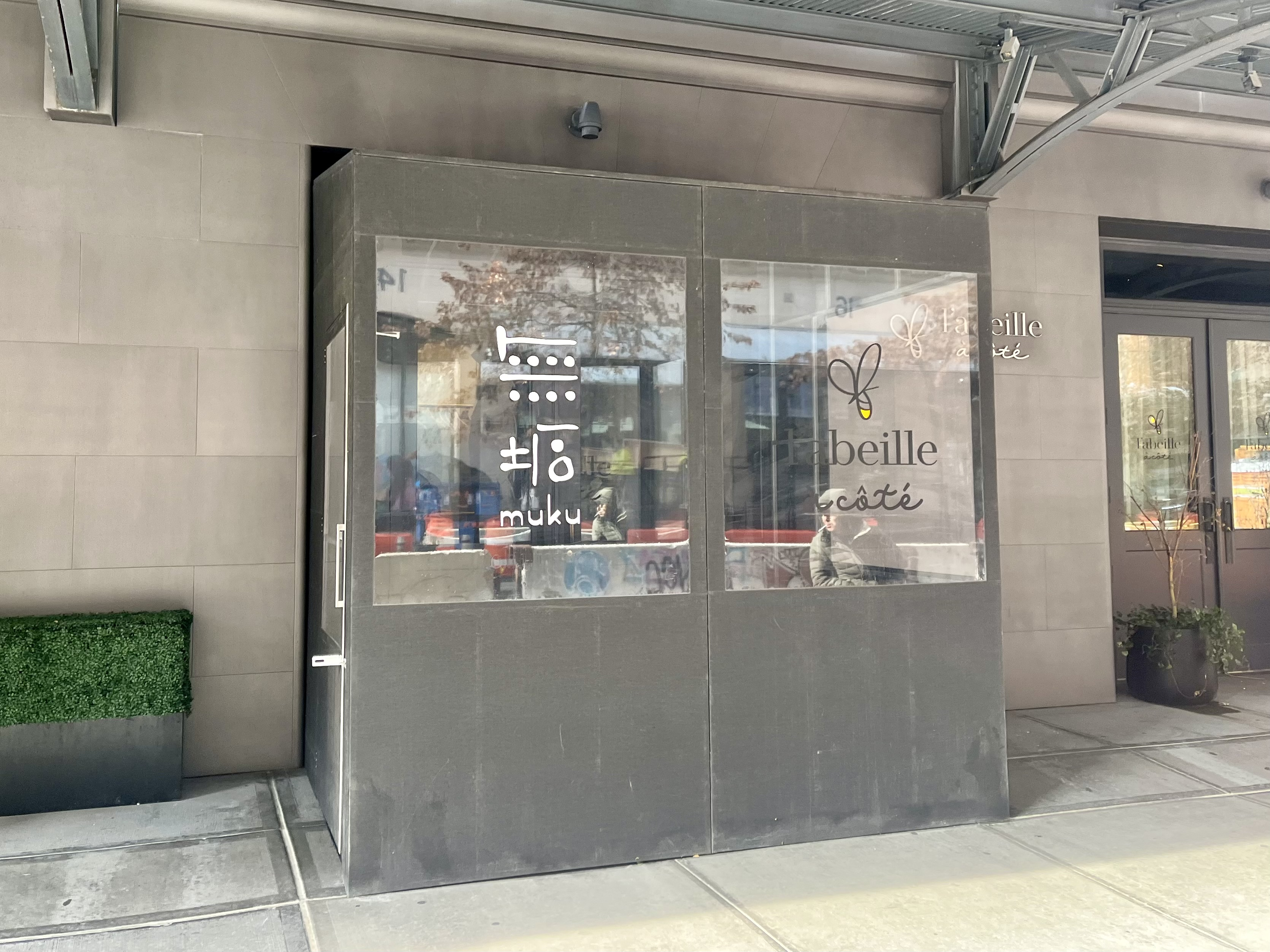
- The restaurant's exterior in 2025
- Interactive map of Muku

Restaurant information
- Established: September 10, 2025
- Rating: (Michelin Guide
- Location: 412 Greenwich Street, New York, New York, United States
- Coordinates: 40°43′19″N 74°00′36″W
- Website: www.restaurantmuku.nyc

Muku is a Michelin-starred restaurant located on Greenwich Street in the TriBeCa neighborhood of Lower Manhattan in New York City. It opened on September 10, 2025 in the former location of Sushi Ichimura.

== See also ==
- List of Michelin-starred restaurants in New York City
