= Nicole Bartelme =

American artist (born 1967)

- Born: April 17, 1967 (age 58); Minneapolis, Minnesota, U.S.
- Education: Rhode Island School of Design
- Known for: Photography, collage, painting, interior design, graphic design, poetry, performance, non-profit
- Spouse: David Bouley
- Awards: G-Technology's 2013 "Driven Creativity" Competition
- Patrons: Henry Buhl, Aaron Schwartz

Nicole Bartelme (born April 17, 1967) is an American artist and the initial founder of The TriBeCa Film Festival in Manhattan, New York City. Bartelme works in multiple genres including photography, interior/set design, poetry and sound. Bartelme received her Bachelor of Fine Arts from the Rhode Island School of Design in 1989. Her studies included Illustration, Film and Textiles. She was influenced by Berenice Abbott, Kurt Schwitters, Sebastião Salgado, Romulo A. Yanes, and John Law.

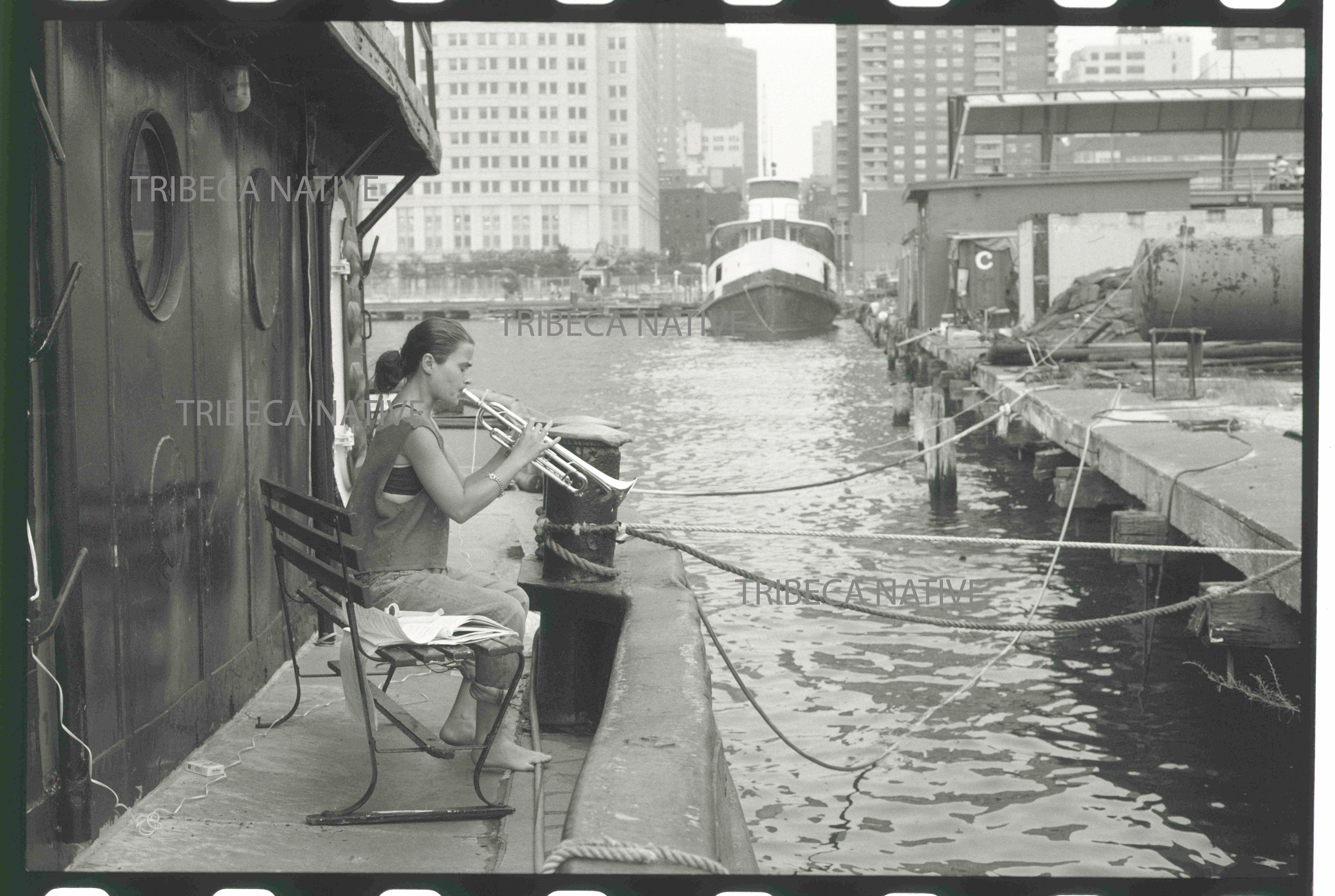
Photo: Nicole Bartelme: "Trumpet Girl, Pier 25"

== TriBeCa ==
As Director of the TriBeCa Partnership in 1997, an initiative of the umbrella organization, Association of Community Employment Programs (ACE), Bartelme left in 2000, to form a new entity: The TriBeCa Film Festival. Proceeds were designed to support ACE's out reach programs for The Homeless in New York City. Her premise for the Festival involved independent films that embrace a common humanity among people with unique sound tracks.

The first public call for entries, “Documentary Films: Give Context to World Issues” was printed in the DownTown Express, December Issue, 2000. On December 9, 2001 within an hour after the website tribecafilmfestival.com was launched over 800 inquiries and congratulatory notes were posted. After the attacks to the World Trade Center, Bartelme negotiated and relinquished trade mark and intellectual property rights to The TriBeCa Film Center. Jane Rosenthal, Robert De Niro and Trina Wyatt subsequently commenced with the TriBeCa Film Festival in April 2002.

== Influences ==
Bartelme’s visual art work is influenced by constructivism, with an injection of abstract expressionist painting and printmaking. Some ‘pieces’ are fronted with silk screen on glass pane. The subject provides personal documents or items that comprise these non-traditional portraits. Many combine oil pigments painted on copper with a reference to journalism’s graphic formatting. Columns and headlines are illustrated through torn fragments of texture that represent the body of text/words, punctuated by cast bronze periods. Like artist Kurt Schwitters, Bartelme is fascinated by fragments both personal and universal that evoke connections, found on sailing voyages to Venezuela or collected from flea markets from New York to Moab to Munich.

Several images reference Bartelme’s photographs documenting eight winters of living on the historic Pennacook, a Moran red tugboat built in 1898. These black and white images capture the individuals that lived on Pier 25, in Manhattan during the 1990s, of which she was awarded Top Photographer in her category of G-Technology's 2013 "Driven Creativity" Competition.

== Books/Publications ==
Bartelme was the editor and photographer of the independently published TriBeCa Guide 2000.

== Sound, Interiors, Set and Costume Design ==
Bartelme’s work in sound and with the poetry of Hafez have been recorded on The Green Sea of Heaven, translations by Elizabeth T. Gray Jr., White Cloud Press and Water From The Well, by Reza Derakshani, Pomegranate Records, 2001. Much of the content recited in the poetry, literature and lore are inspirations for her visual works. Interiors, both commercial and residential as well as Set Designs are an extension of Bartelme’s paintings/photographic collages. Patterns and textiles are the foundation. Backdrops have textures filled with reference, woven together with tension both torn and whole. Dancers held high reveal unfolding costumes that serve as a foreground scrim to conceal or reveal their movements. “Being connected to the TriBeCa Community serves as a linchpin for my creative endeavors” Bartelme said, “It’s a think tank of colleagues and shared ideas”.
