= Habanero =

Strain of chili (Capsicum)

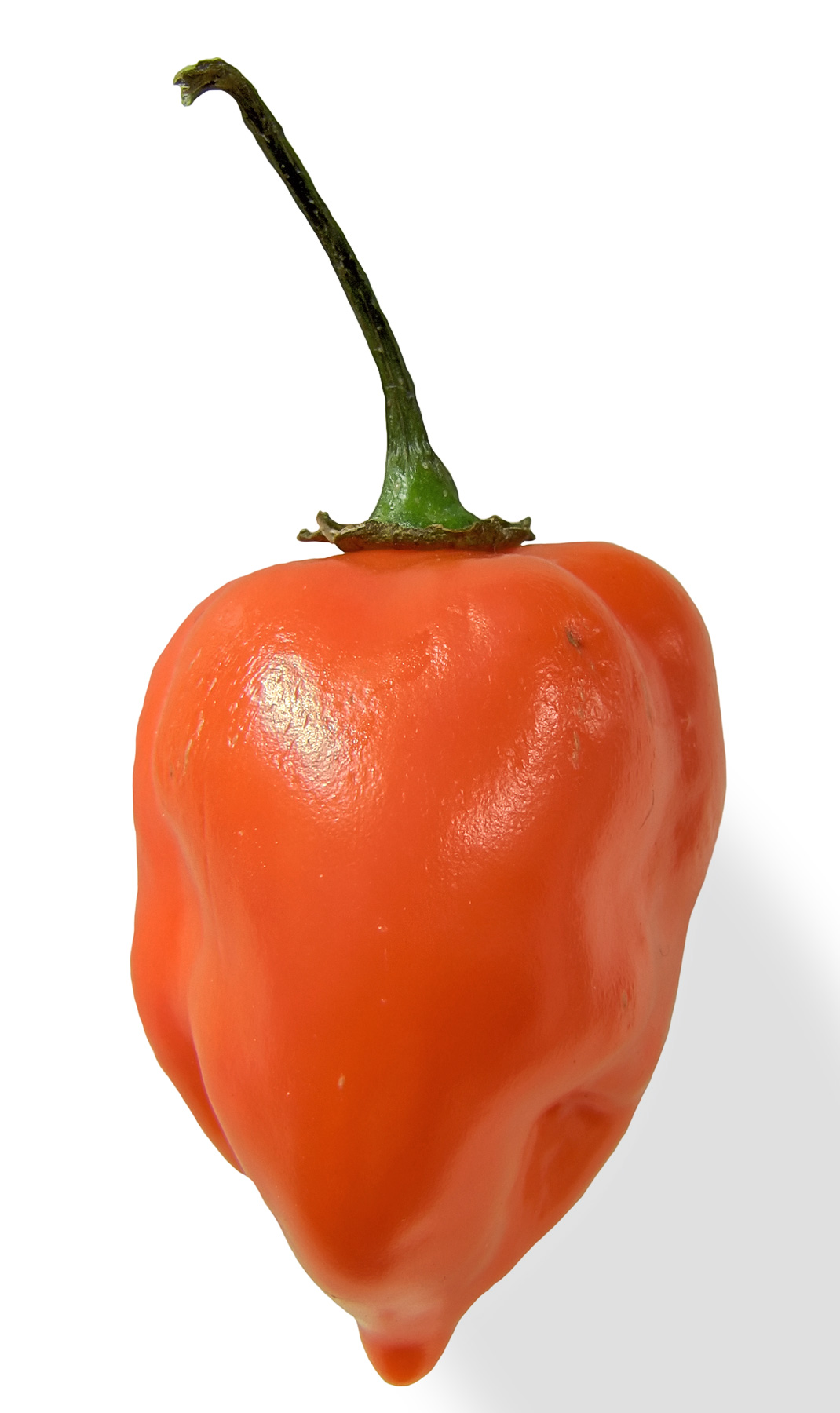
- Species: Capsicum chinense
- Cultivar: 'Habanero'
- Origin: The Amazon
- Heat: Very hot
- Scoville scale: 100,000 – 350,000 SHU

The habanero (/ˌ(h)ɑːbəˈnɛəroʊ/; Spanish: [aβaˈneɾo]) is a pungent cultivar of Capsicum chinense chili pepper. Unripe habaneros are green, and they color as they mature. The most common color variants are orange and red, but the fruit may also be white, brown, yellow, green, or purple. Typically, a ripe habanero is 2–6 centimetres (3/4–2 1/4 inches) long. Habanero chilis are very hot, rated 100,000–350,000 on the Scoville scale. The habanero's heat, flavor, and floral aroma make it a common ingredient in hot sauces and other spicy foods.

== Name ==
The habanero is named after Havana (or La Habana), the capital of Cuba, because it used to feature heavily in trading there (despite the name, habaneros and other spicy-hot ingredients are rarely used in traditional Cuban cooking). In English, it is sometimes incorrectly spelled habañero and pronounced /ˌ(h)ɑːbəˈnjɛəroʊ/, the tilde being added as a hyperforeignism patterned after jalapeño.

== Origin and use ==
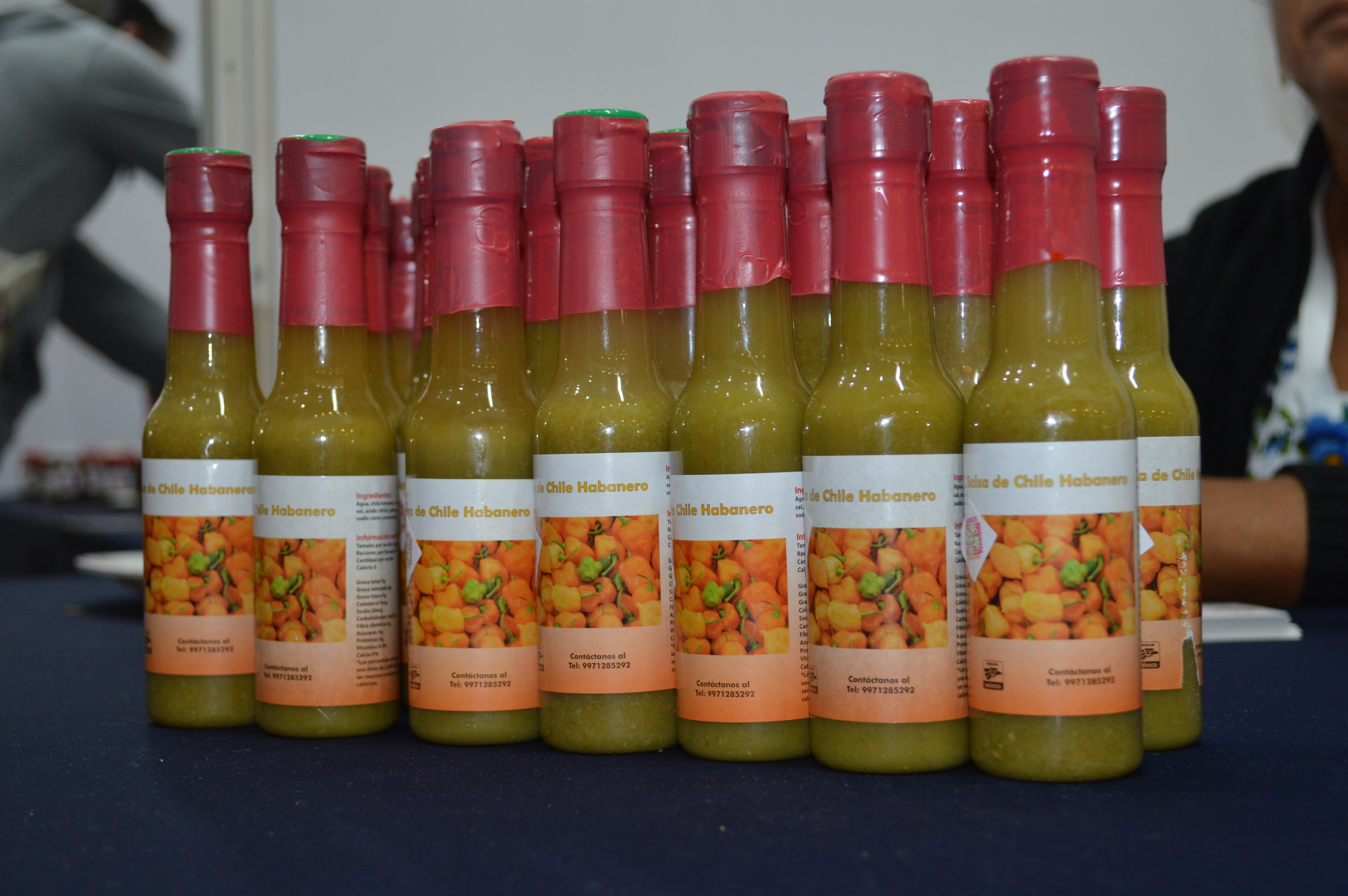
Habanero hot sauce from Flor de Lirio, an Indigenous cooperative in Peto Municipality, Yucatán

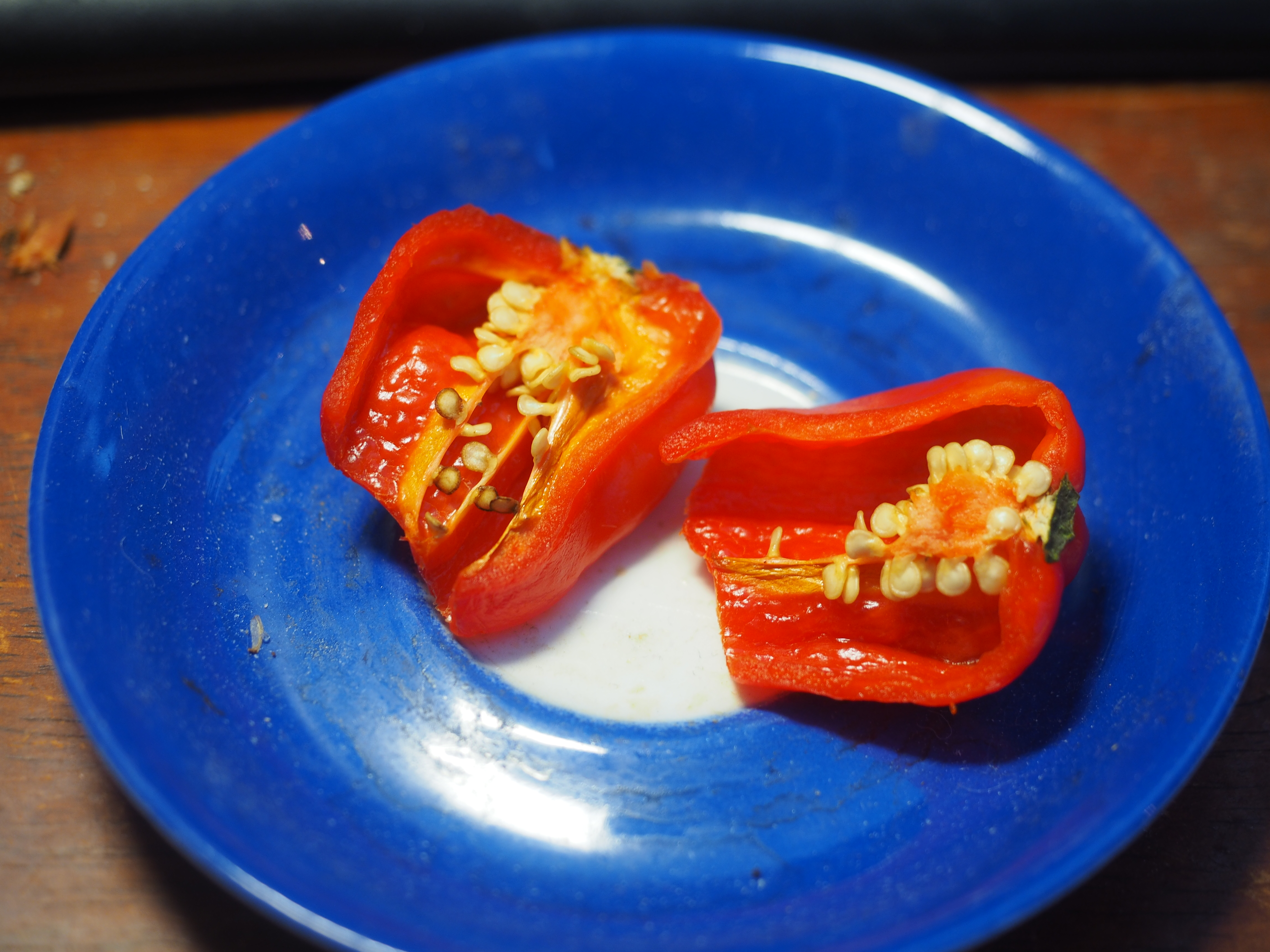
A habanero pepper cut in half to expose the seeds

The habanero chili comes from the Amazon, from which it was spread, reaching Mexico. Today, the largest producer of the habanero pepper is the Yucatán Peninsula, in Mexico. Habaneros are an integral part of Yucatecan food, accompanying most dishes, either in natural form or purée or salsa. Other modern producers include Belize, Panama, Costa Rica, Colombia, Ecuador, and parts of the United States, including Texas, Idaho, and California.

The habanero chili was disseminated by Spanish colonists to other areas of the world, to the point that 18th-century taxonomists mistook China for its place of origin and called it Capsicum chinense ("the Chinese pepper").

The Scotch bonnet is often compared to the habanero, since they are two varieties of the same species, but they have different pod types. Both the Scotch bonnet and the habanero have thin, waxy flesh. They have a similar heat level and flavor. Both varieties average around the same level of pungency, but as with other pepper varieties, the actual degree varies greatly from one fruit to another according to genetics, growing methods, climate, and plant stress.

In 1999, the habanero was listed by Guinness World Records as the world's hottest chili, but it has since been displaced by other peppers. The heat of the habanero does not immediately take effect, but sets in over a period of a few minutes and lasts up to an hour in the mouth. The heat can sometimes be felt in the esophagus some hours after consumption. The Trinidad moruga scorpion has since been identified as a native Capsicum chinense subspecies even hotter than the habanero. Breeders constantly crossbreed subspecies to attempt to create cultivars that will break the record on the Scoville scale. One example is the Carolina Reaper, supposedly a cross between a bhut jolokia pepper with a particularly pungent red habanero.

== Cultivation ==
Habaneros thrive in hot weather. Like all peppers, the habanero does well in an area with good morning sun and in soil with a pH level around 5 to 6 (slightly acidic). Habaneros which are watered daily produce more vegetative growth but the same number of fruit, with lower concentrations of capsaicin, as compared to plants which are watered only when dry (every seven days). Overly moist soil and roots will produce bitter-tasting peppers. Daily watering during flowering and early setting of fruit helps prevent flower and immature fruit from dropping, but flower dropping rates often reach 90% even in ideal conditions.

The habanero is a perennial flowering plant, meaning that with proper care and growing conditions, it can produce flowers (and thus fruit) for many years. Habanero bushes are good candidates for a container garden. In temperate climates, though, it is treated as an annual, dying each winter and being replaced the next spring. In tropical and subtropical regions, the habanero, like other chiles, will produce year round. As long as conditions are favorable, the plant will set fruit continuously.

== Cultivars ==
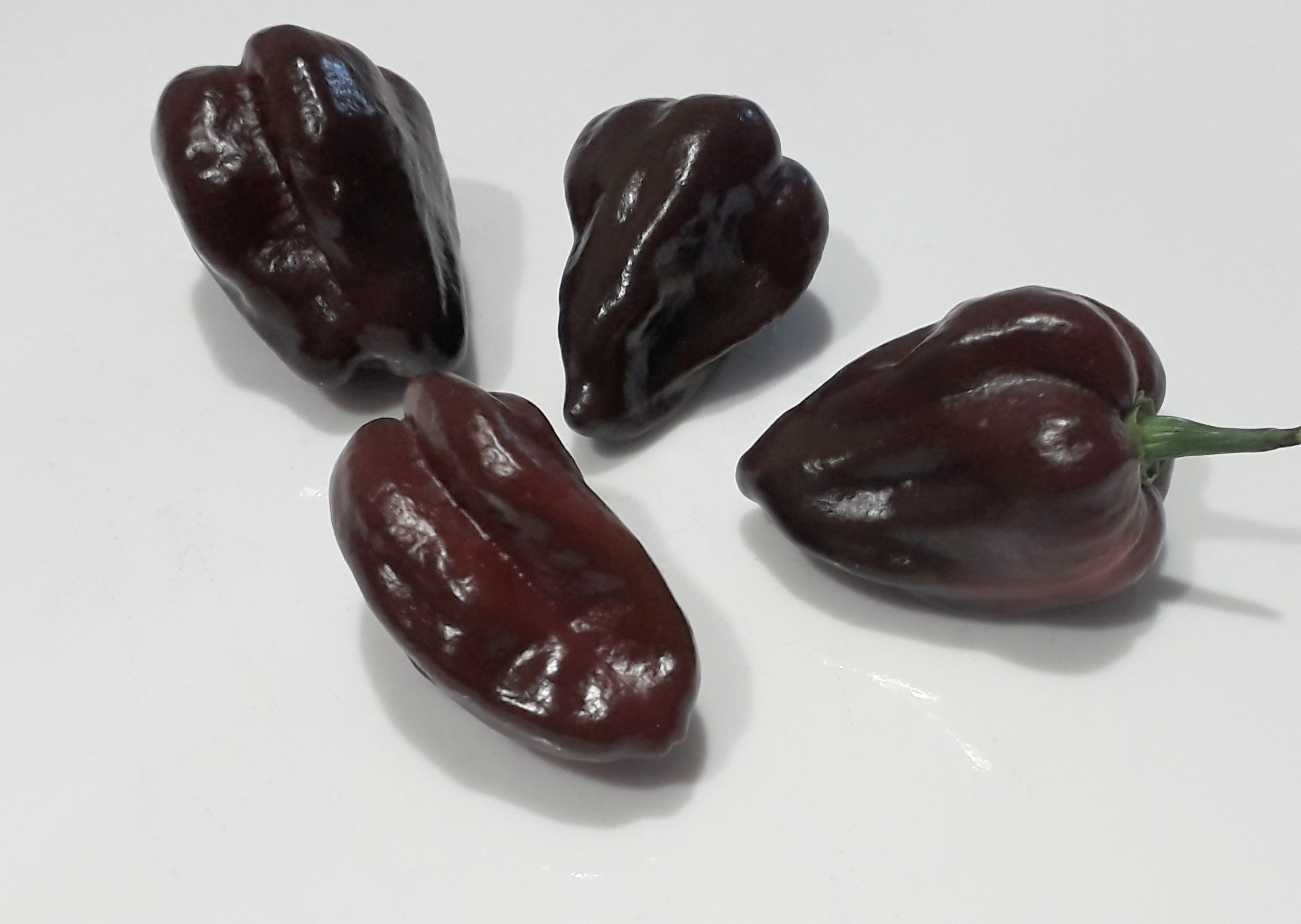
Habanero peppers, brown (chocolate) variety

Several growers have attempted to selectively breed habanero plants to produce hotter, heavier, and larger peppers. Most habaneros rate between 200,000 and 300,000 on the Scoville scale. In 2004, researchers in Texas created a mild version of the habanero, but retained the traditional aroma and flavor. The milder version was obtained by crossing the Yucatán habanero pepper with a heatless habanero from Bolivia over several generations. Breeder Michael Mazourek used a mutation discovered by the Chile Pepper Institute to create a heatless version labeled the 'Habanada' bred in 2007 and released in 2014.

Black habanero is an alternative name often used to describe the dark brown variety of habanero chilis, which are slightly smaller and more spherical. Some seeds have been found which are thought to be over 7,000 years old. The black habanero has an exotic and unusual taste, and is hotter than a regular habanero with a rating between 425,000 and 577,000 Scoville units. Small slivers used in cooking can have a dramatic effect on the overall dish. Black habaneros take considerably longer to grow than other habanero chili varieties.

Caribbean Red, a cultivar within the habanero family, has a citrusy and slightly smoky flavor, with a Scoville rating ranging from 300,000 to 445,000 Scoville units.

== Gallery ==
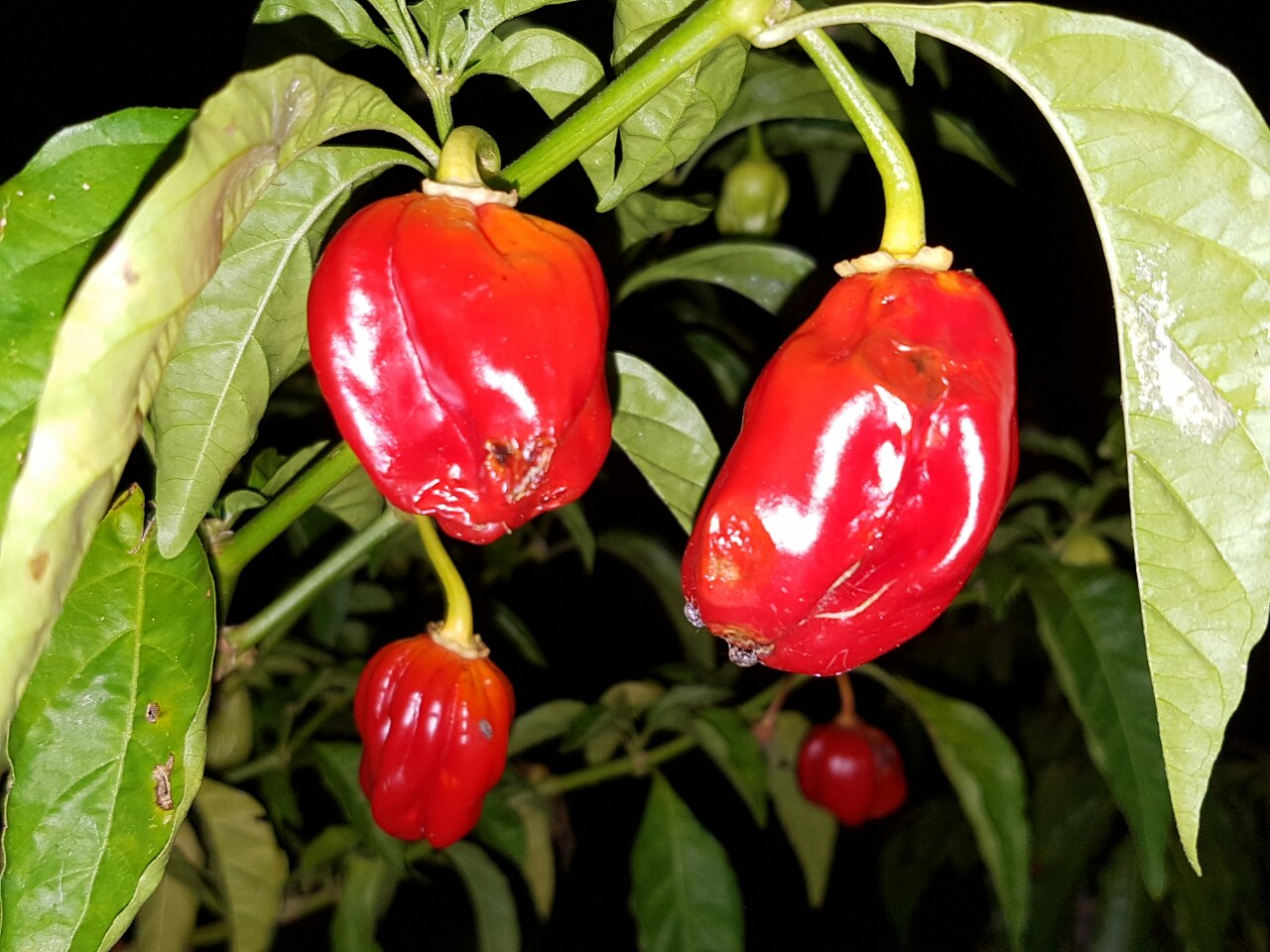
Red habanero chiles growing on the plant

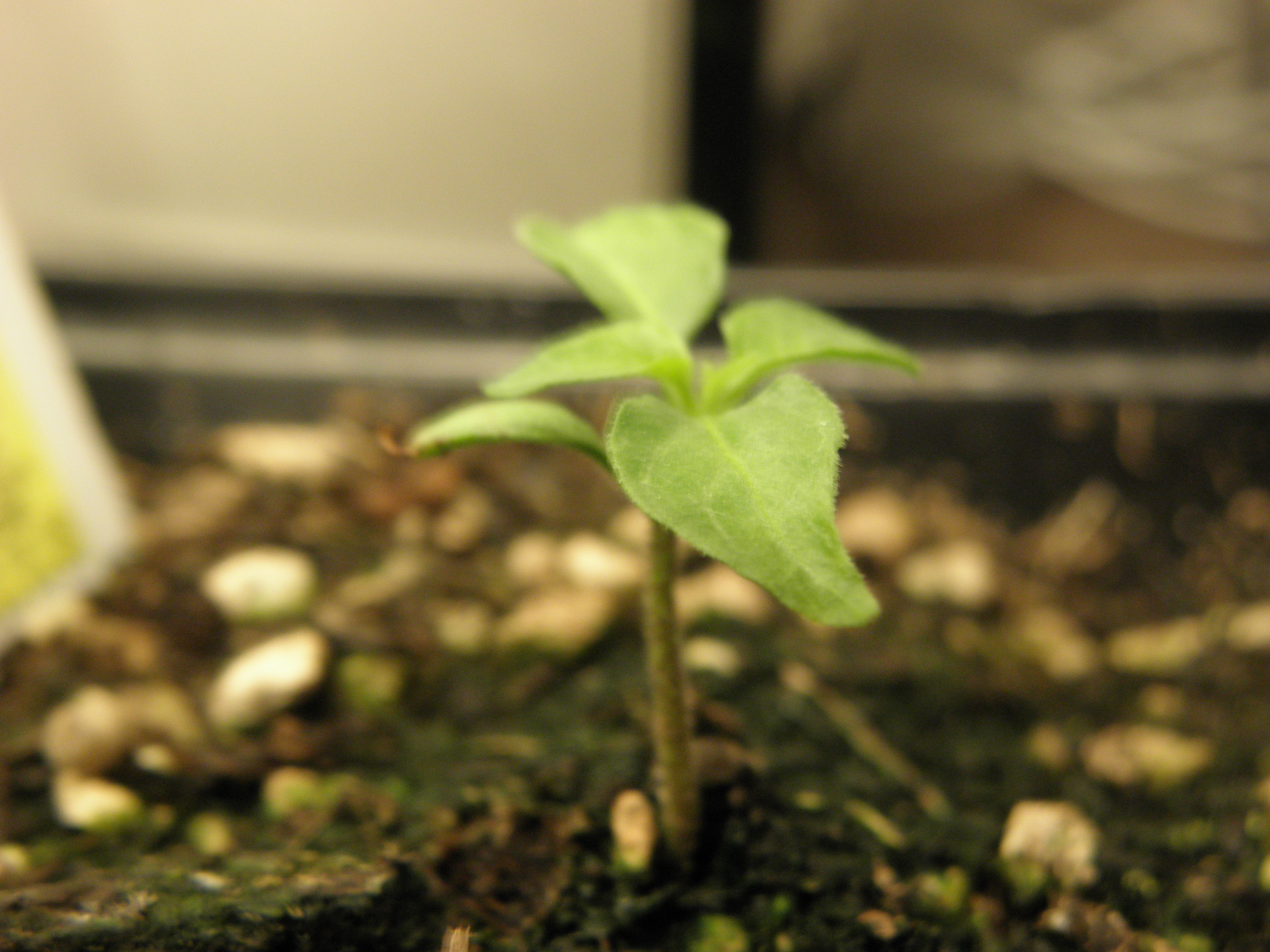
Habanero seedling

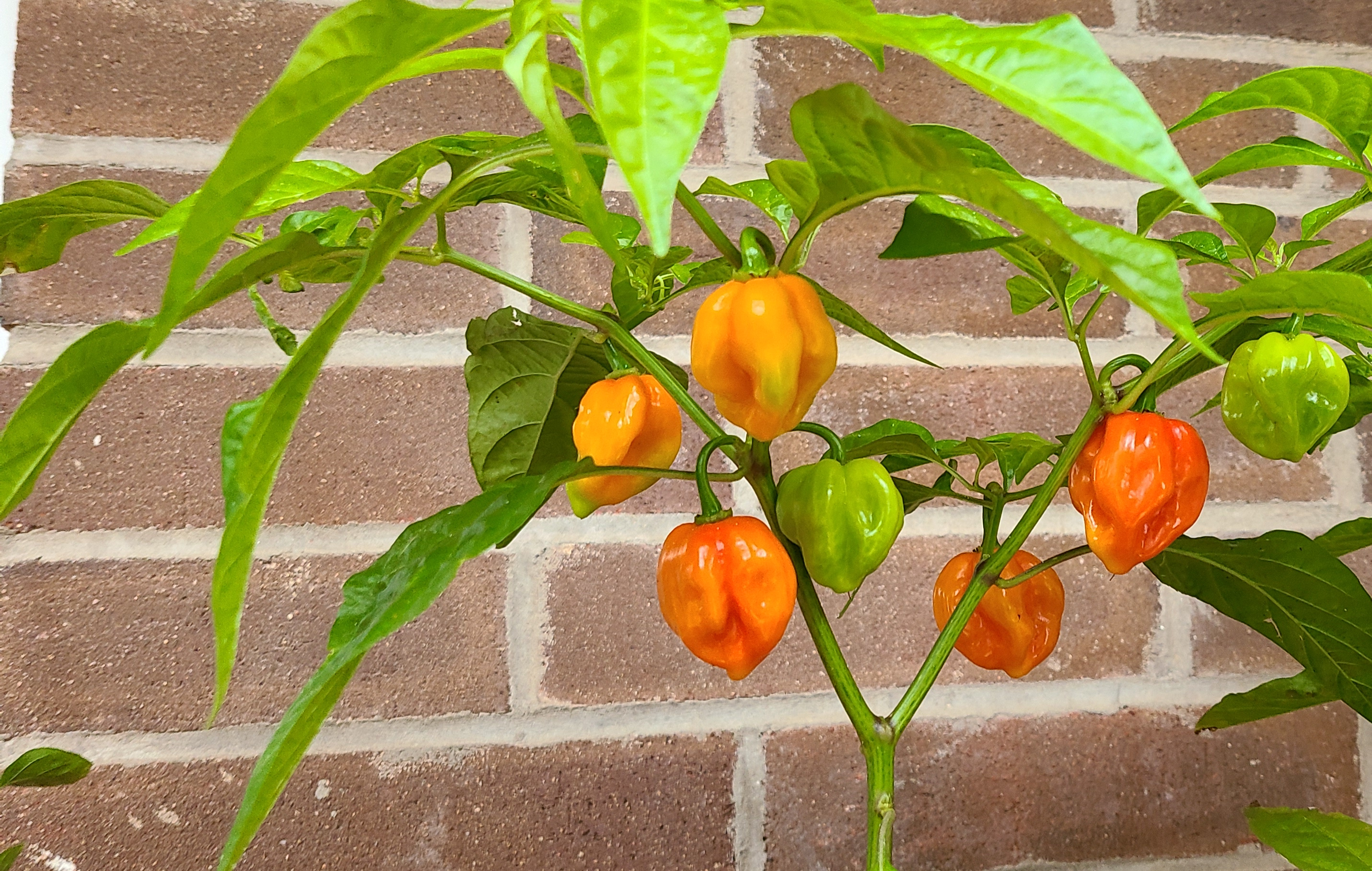
Habanero plant with fruits

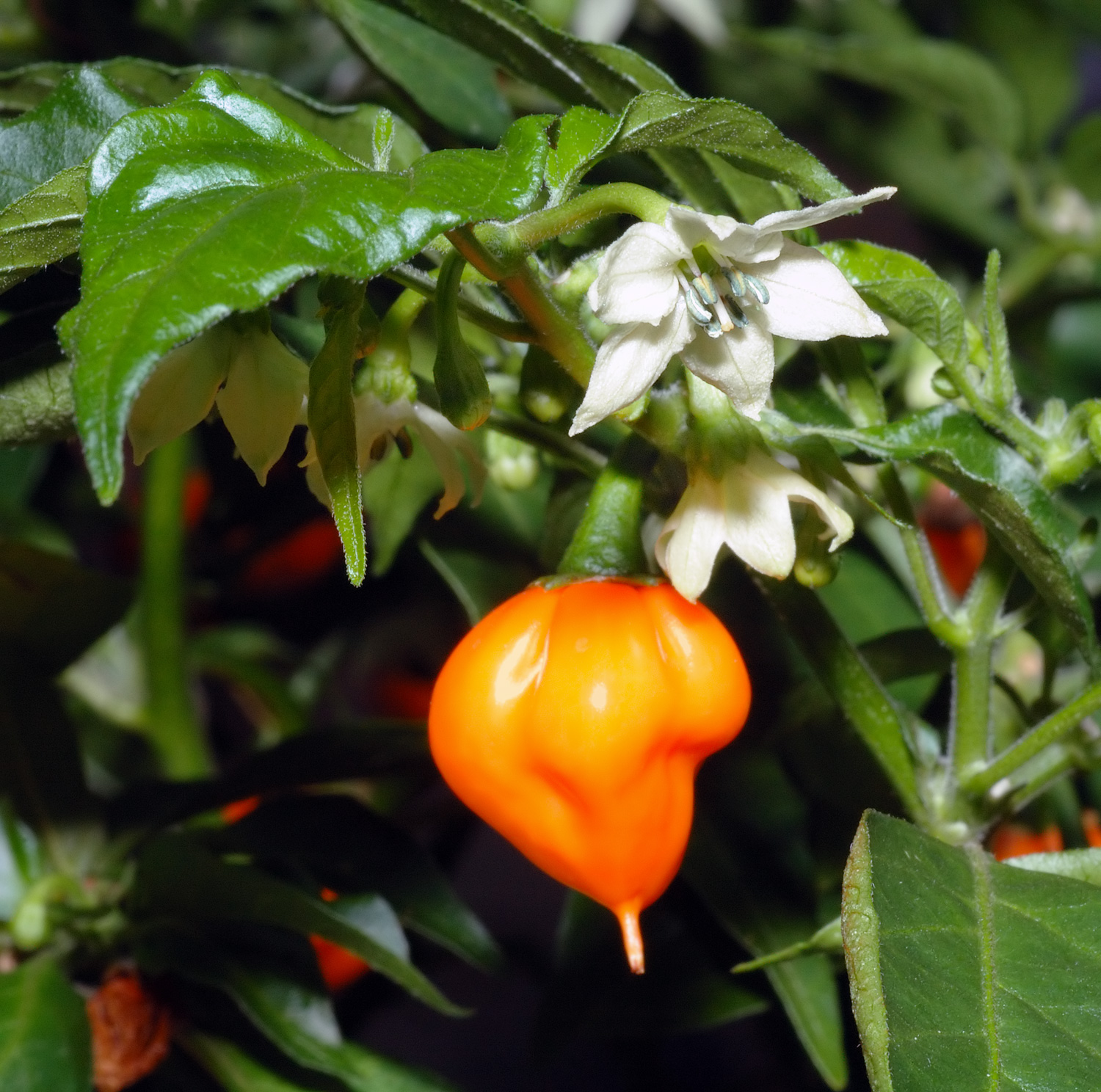
Habanero plant with fruit and flower

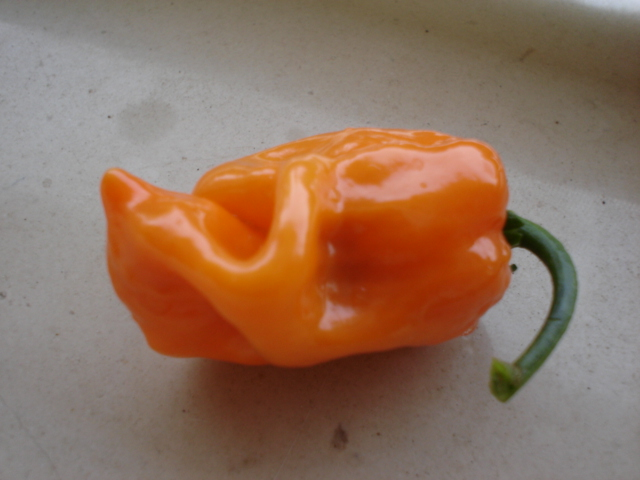
Orange habanero

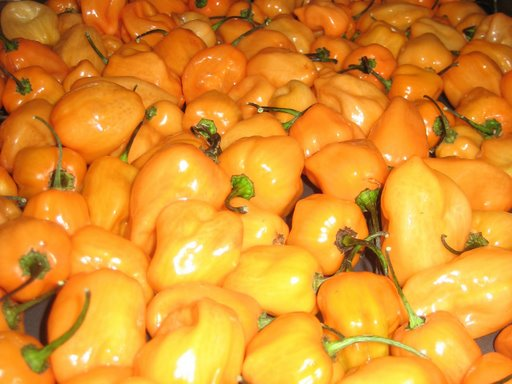
Orange habaneros

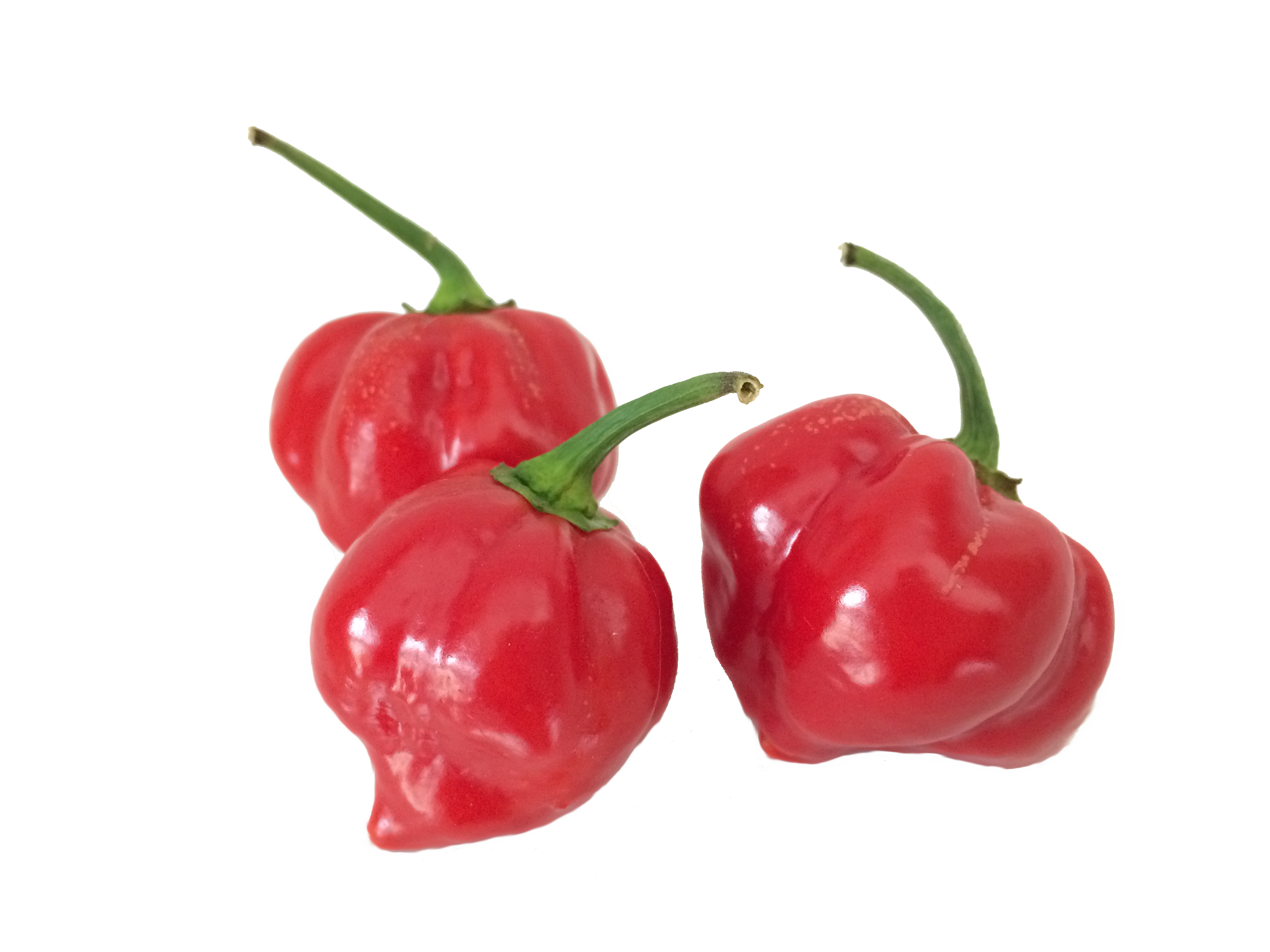
Red habaneros

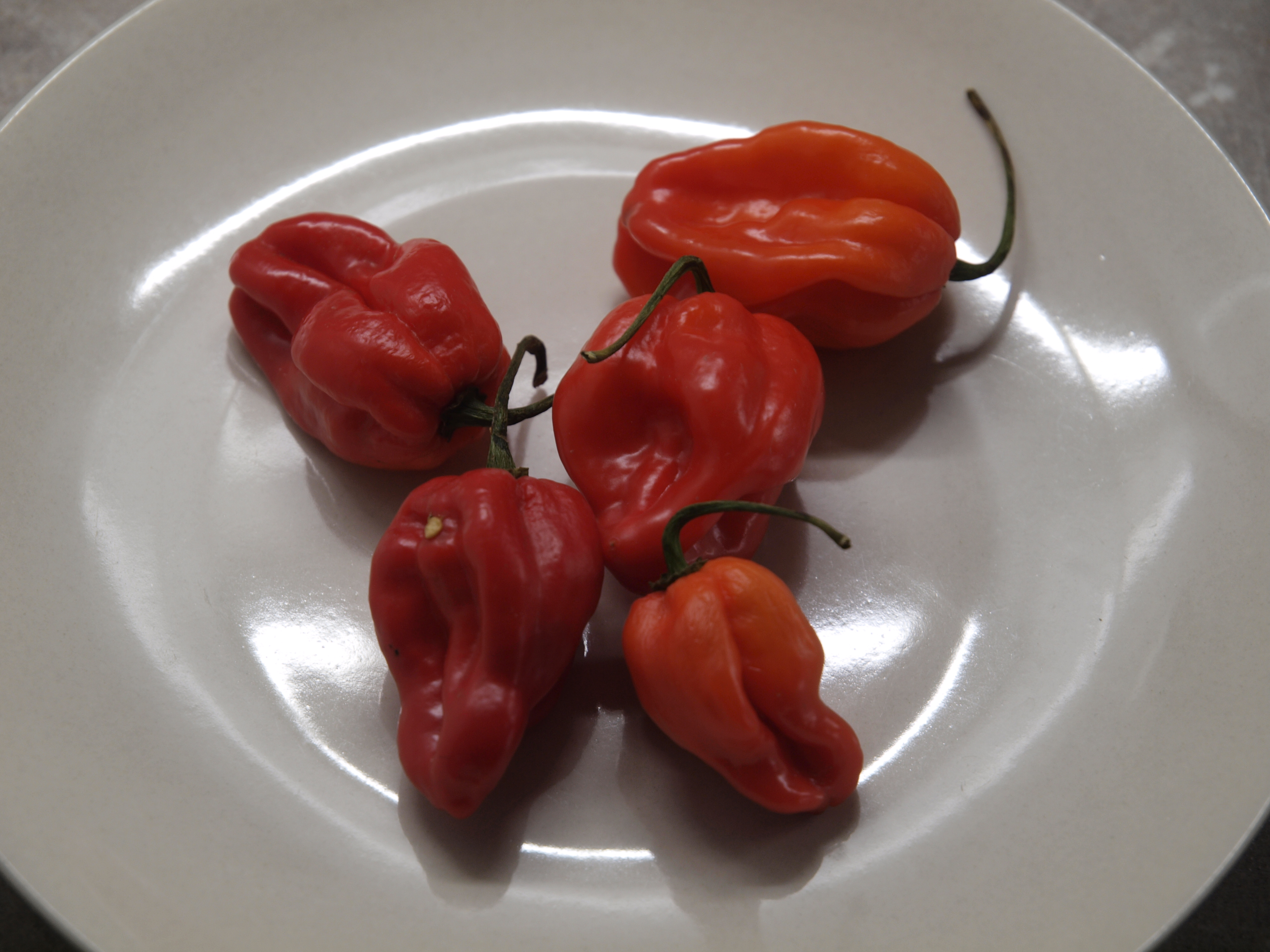
Red habaneros on a plate, bought from a food store

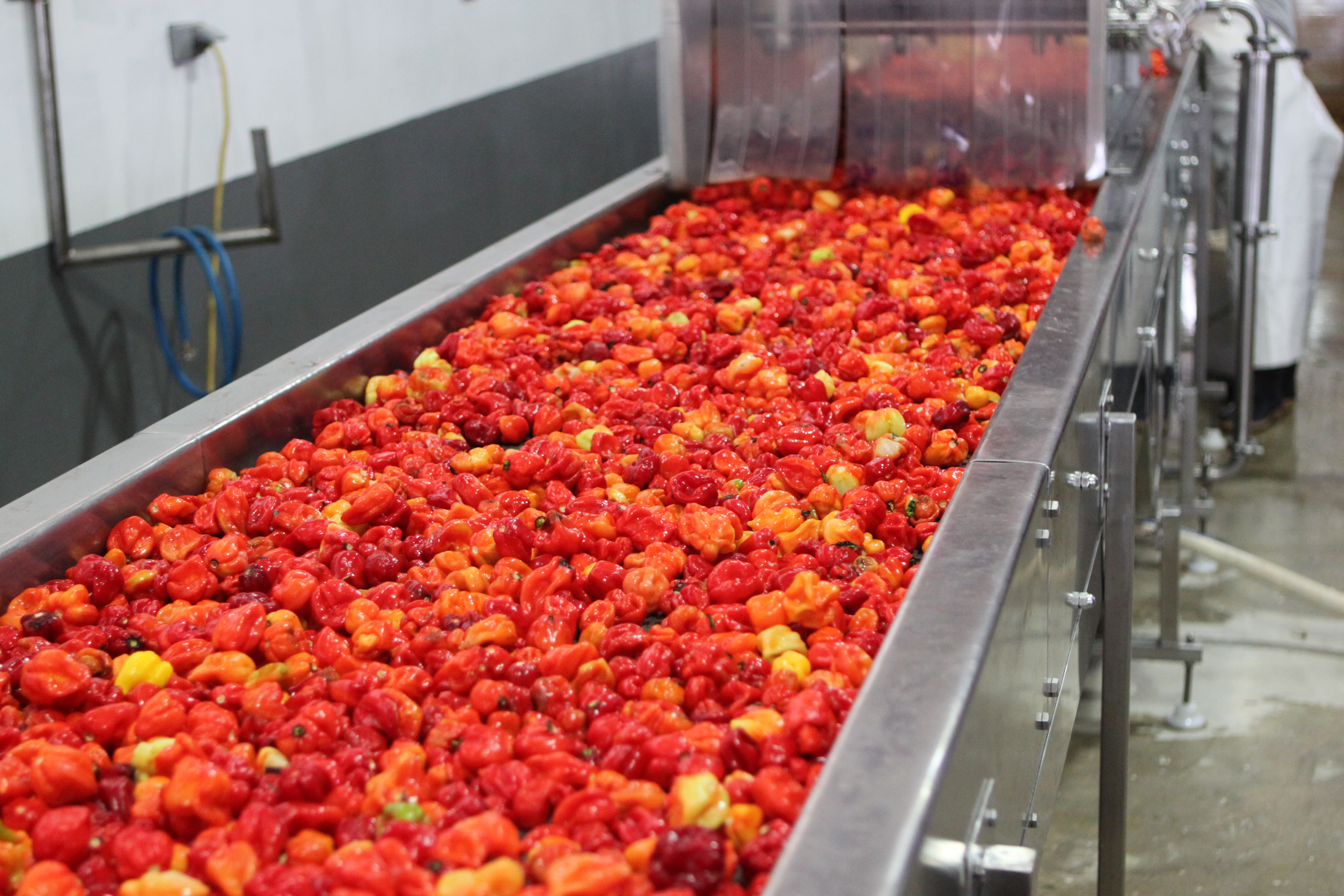
Belizean red habaneros being prepared for washing, sorting and grinding

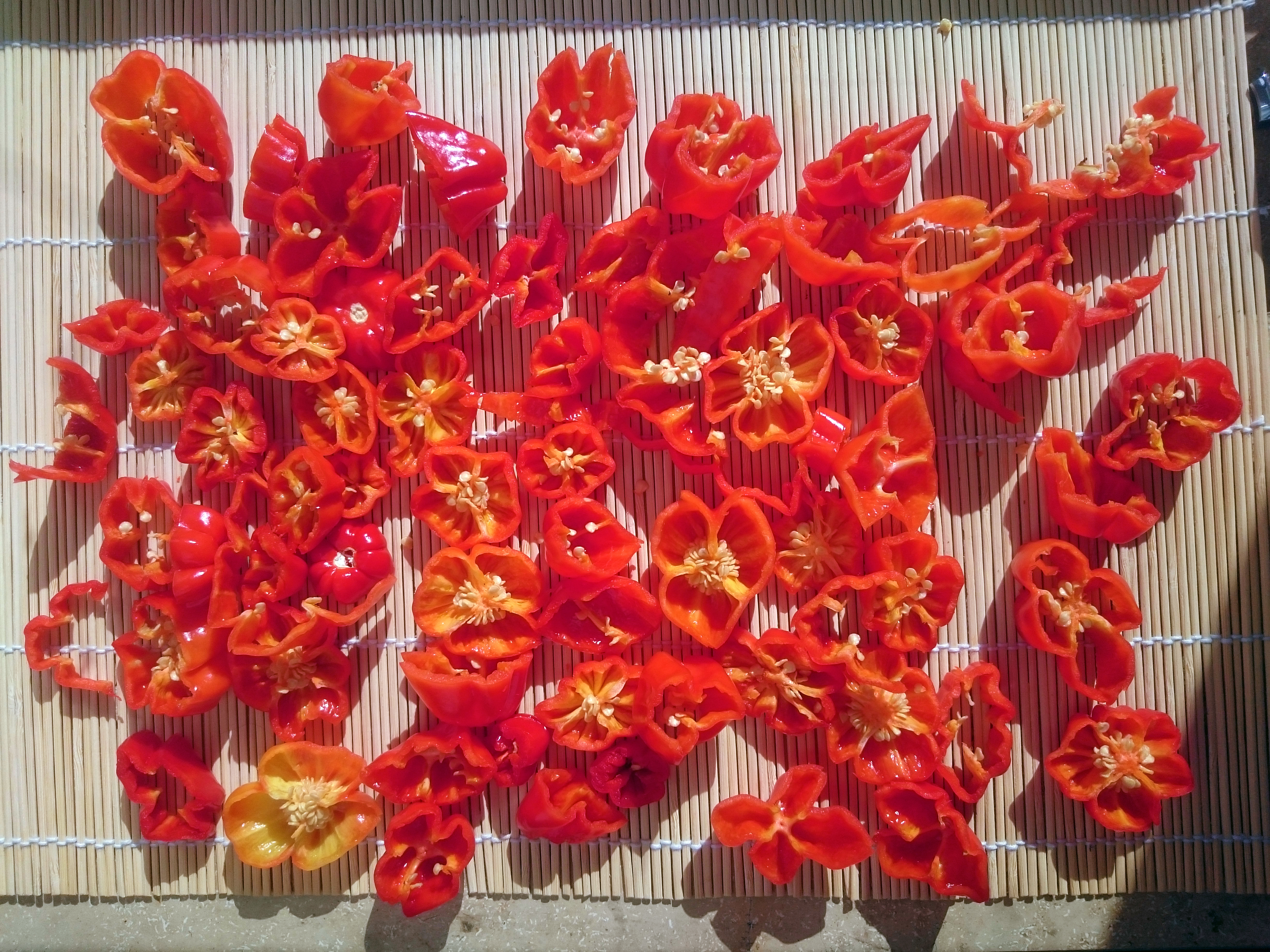
Habaneros sun-drying

== See also ==
- Habanada
- Capsicum (pepper family)
- Jalapeño
- Hottest chili pepper
- Scotch bonnet
