= Ichimura at Brushstroke =

Coordinates: 40°46′05″N 73°58′55″W

Brushstroke
- Interactive map of Brushstroke

Restaurant information
- Established: April 20, 2011
- Closed: September 29, 2018
- Owner: David Bouley
- Head chef: Isao Yamada
- Food type: Kaiseki and sushi
- Location: 30 Hudson St. (Duane Street), New York City, New York, 10013, United States
- Website: www.davidbouley.com/brushstroke-main/brushstroke-sushi-%E9%AE%A8/

Brushstroke was a Japanese kaiseki restaurant located on Hudson Street in Manhattan, New York City. The owners of the restaurant were French chef David Bouley and Yoshiki Tsuji, who is president of Tsuji culinary school in Osaka, Japan. Sushi Ichimura at brushstroke was opened inside of the restaurant Brushstoke in 2012. They employed the head chef Tokyo-trained Eiji Ichimura, who has been cooking sushi for over 40 years.

== Closing ==
Eiji Ichimura left the restaurant in November 2016. The restaurant closed down on September 29, 2018.
