= Molly Jahn =

American plant geneticist

- Education: Swarthmore College, Massachusetts Institute of Technology, Cornell University
- Known for: Deputy and Acting Under Secretary of Research, Education, and Economics at the U.S. Department of Agriculture, 2009-10
- Scientific career
- Fields: Genetics, Plant virology, Food security
- Workplaces: Cornell University, University of Wisconsin-Madison

Molly Jahn is an American plant geneticist and breeder and Professor of Agronomy at University of Wisconsin-Madison, USA. She was Under Secretary of Research, Education and Economics in the U.S. Department of Agriculture (2009 - 2010).

== Career ==
Jahn (originally Kyle) graduated with BA in biology (with Distinction) from Swarthmore College in 1980. She subsequently completed a master's degree at MIT in 1983 and obtained her doctorate in plant breeding and plant pathology from Cornell University in 1988. She was appointed assistant, associate and finally full professor of plant breeding and plant biology at Cornell University from 1991 to 2006. She moved to University of Wisconsin-Madison where she was dean of the College of Agricultural and Life Sciences, and director of the Wisconsin Experiment Station from 2006 - 2011 and continues as professor of agronomy.

She also hold appointments outside University of Wisconsin-Madison. During 2009–10, she was Deputy and Acting Under Secretary of Research, Education, and Economics at the U.S. Department of Agriculture. She was seconded to NASA in 2019-20 and continued as 25%-time Director of Strategic Outreach, NASA Harvest Consortium into 2022.

== Scientific research ==
Her research interests include plant genetics and genomics especially the resistance of plants to viruses. She has concentrated on the Solanaceae specifically potatoes, tomatoes and pungency in Capsicum, but has also worked with melons, squashes and pumpkins. She has been involved with and led plant breeding programmes that have resulted in new cultivars of squash (including All American Selections Winner Bush Delicata in 2002;Honeynut in 2014; All American Selections Winners Honeybaby F1 and Sugaretti in 2017), pepper, melon and cucumber (Salt and Pepper in 2011) varieties as well as having received awards for potato breeding.

As well as plant breeding her research has involved fundamental aspects of plant physiology. As her career has developed she has become more involved in public policy areas of plant science, particularly related to world food security.

== Distinctions ==
Jahn has served on advisory boards including the US National Academies of Science Board on Agriculture and Natural Resources, the Santa Fe Institute Science Board and was the USA representative on the CGIAR’s Commission for Sustainable Agriculture and Climate Change.

In 2012 she was awarded a USDA Secretary's Honor Award for an electronic suggestions box so USDA employees could make anonymous suggestions to improve the agency.

Jahn has been awarded Honorary D.Sc. degrees from Anglia Ruskin University, UK in 2014 and Swarthmore College in 2015. She was commencement speaker at the University of Sydney in 2016. She is also a Fellow of the AAAS and the Wisconsin Academy of Arts, Sciences and Letters.

== Significant publications ==
Jahn has authored or co-authored over 100 scientific publications and books. Her most significant publications include:

- Jayamaha, B., J. Matisek, W. Reno, M.M. Jahn. (2018) Changing weather patterns, climate change and civil war dynamics: Institutions and conflicts in the Sahel. J. Diplomacy and International Relations 20(1):70-87.
- Lunt, T., A.W. Jones, W.S. Mulhern, D.P.M. LeZaks, M.M. Jahn. (2016) Vulnerabilities to agricultural production shocks: An extreme, plausible scenario for assessment of risk for the insurance sector. Climate Risk Management. DOI 10.1016/j.crm.2016.05.001
- Beddington J. R, M. Asaduzzaman, M. E. Clark, A. Fernandez Bremauntz, M. D. Guillou, D. J. B. Howlett, M. M. Jahn, E. Lin, T. Mamo, C. Negra, C. A. Nobre, R. J. Scholes, N. Van Bo, J. Wakhungu. (2012) What Next for Agriculture After Durban? Science 335:6066, 289–290.
- Wu, F., N.T. Eannetta, Y. Xu, R. Durrett, M. Mazourek, M.M. Jahn and S.D. Tanksley. (2009) A COSII genetic map of the pepper genome provides a detailed picture of synteny with tomato and new insights into recent chromosome evolution in the Genus Capsicum. Theor. Appl. Genet. 118: 1279–1293.
- Mazourek, M., A. Pujar, Y. Borovsky, I. Paran, L. Mueller and M. M. Jahn. (2009) A dynamic interface for capsaicinoid systems biology. Plant Physiology 150:1806-1821.
- Kang, B.-C., I. Yeam and M.M. Jahn. (2005) Genetics of resistance to plant viruses. Ann. Rev. Phytopathology 42:581-621.
- Stewart, C.S., B.C. Kang, K. Liu, M. Mazourek, E.Y. Yoo, S.L. Moore, B.D. Kim, I. Paran and M.M. Jahn. (2005) The Pun1 gene in pepper encodes a putative acyltransferase. Plant J. 42:675-688.
- Naylor, R.L., W.P. Falcon, R.M. Goodman, M.M. Jahn, T. Sengooba, H. Tefera and R.J. Nelson. (2004) Biotechnology in the developing world: a case for increased investments in orphan crops. Food Policy 29:15-44.
- Alba, R., Z. Fei, P. Payton, Y. Liu, S.L. Moore, P. Debbie, J.S. Gordon, J.K.C. Rose, G. Martin, S.D. Tanksley, M. Bouzayen, M.M. Jahn and J. Giovannoni. (2004) ESTs, cDNA microarrays and gene expression profiling: tools for dissecting plant physiology and development. Plant J. 39:697-714.
- Rose, J.K.C., S. Bashir, J.J. Giovannoni, M.M. Jahn and R.S. Saravanan. (2004) Tackling the plant proteome: practical approaches, hurdles and experimental tools. Plant J 39:715-733.
- Grube, R.C., E.R. Radwanski and M.M. Jahn. (2000) Comparative genetics of disease resistance within the Solanaceae. Genetics 155:873-887.
- Thorup, T.A., B. Tanyolac, K.D. Livingstone, S. Popovsky, I. Paran and M.M. Jahn. (2000) Candidate gene analysis of organ pigmentation loci in the Solanaceae. Proc. Natl. Acad. Sci. USA 97:11192-11197.
- Livingstone, K.D., V. Lackney, J.R. Blauth, R. Van Wijk and M.M. Jahn. (1999) Genome mapping in Capsicum and the evolution of genome structure in the Solanaceae. Genetics 152:1183-1202.
- M. M. Kyle (ed) (1993) Resistance to viral diseases of vegetables: genetics and breeding. Timber Press, Portland, Oregon. ISBN 0-88192-256-0 278pp
