= Blue Hill at Stone Barns =

Restaurant in Pocantico Hills, New York

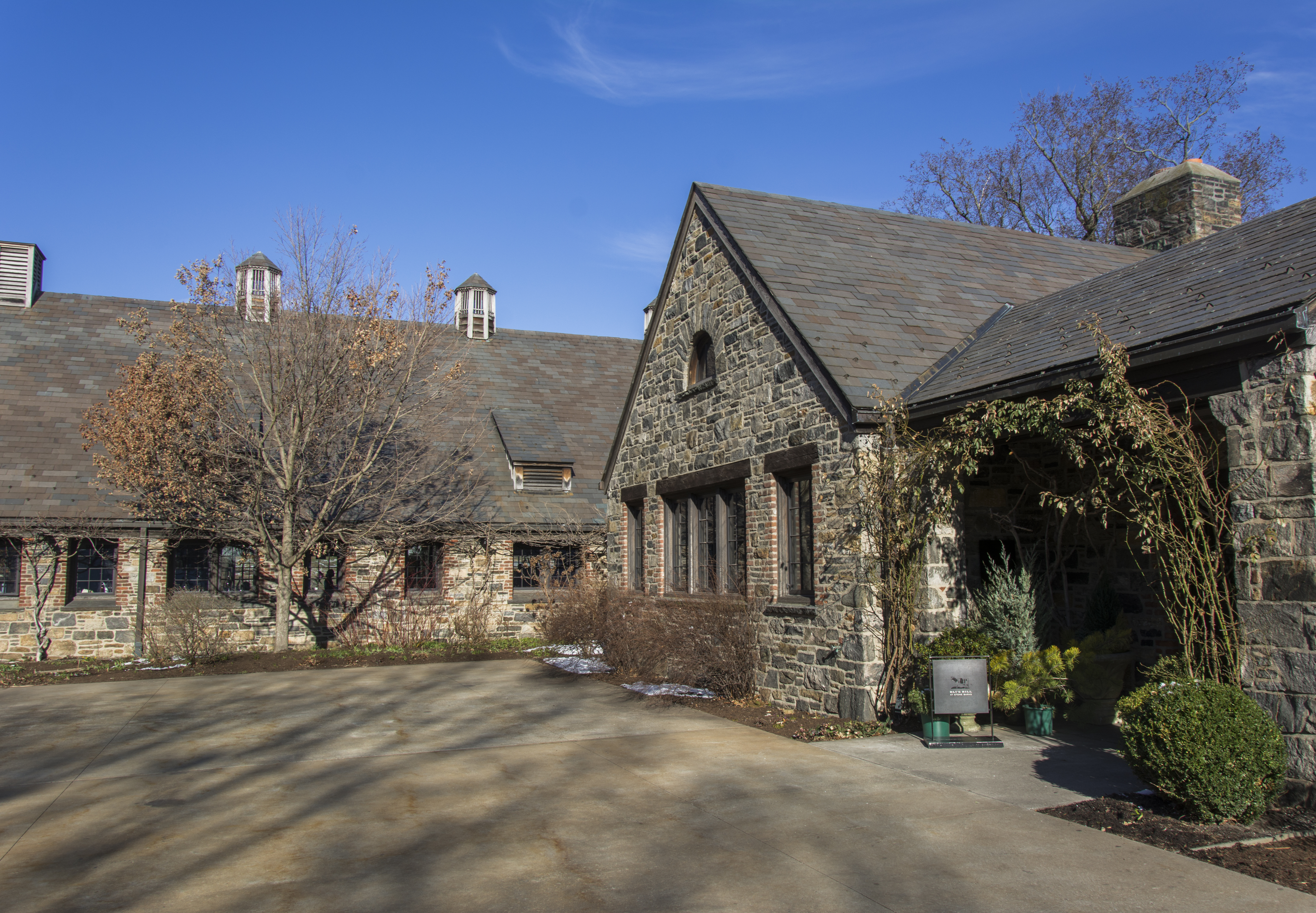
- Interactive map of Blue Hill at Stone Barns

Restaurant information
- Established: 2004
- Owner(s): Dan, David, and Laureen Barber
- Head chef: Dan Barber
- Dress code: Formal
- Rating: 2 Michelin stars 1 Michelin green star
- Location: 630 Bedford Road, Pocantico Hills, New York
- Reservations: Required
- Website: Official website

Blue Hill at Stone Barns is a restaurant at the Stone Barns Center for Food & Agriculture in Pocantico Hills, New York. The Hudson Valley restaurant is owned by Dan, David, and Laureen Barber, who also own the New York City Family Meal at Blue Hill restaurant. The lead chef of the restaurant is Dan Barber.

== About ==
Blue Hill opened in 2004 and seats 88 people in a building that had previously been a cow barn for the Rockefeller dairy farm. The restaurant serves contemporary cuisine using local ingredients, with an emphasis on produce from the center's farm. Blue Hill staff also participate in the Stone Barns Center's education programs. In 2016, Eater rated Blue Hill at Stone Barns as the best restaurant in the United States. In 2019, the Michelin Guide expanded the definition of its New York City region guide to include Westchester County, and gave the restaurant two Michelin Stars. It was the only restaurant in the county to receive any Michelin Stars.

In May 2020, due to the coronavirus pandemic, Barber launched the resourcED program at Blue Hill at Stone Barns restaurants which packaged ingredients from the Stone Barns farm and included directions for customers to cook themselves. The boxes were intended to keep the restaurant and their suppliers in business when they could not host diners due to gathering restrictions.

In 2020, Dan Barber announced he would be stepping down from the kitchen of Blue Hill at Stone Barns and Blue Hill in Greenwich Village. The change was implemented in 2021, with the kitchens being led with a diversity-focused rotating chef-in-residence concept. The new concept was a response to the Black Lives Matter protests bringing attention to structural inequities in the restaurant industry. As of 2022, Barber has returned to cooking at Blue Hill at Stone Barns.

In 2022, Eater published an exposé on the restaurant's ethics, interviewing 45 people, including 20 former employees, alleging a hostile workplace with low pay, high stress, 70-hour workweeks, abusive management, and stonewalling of sexual assault claims. The article also highlights several examples of fraudulent practices – with the restaurant claiming unique and special stories about several of their dishes while taking shortcuts or deviating from what the staff was told to tell guests. Through the crisis and reputation management firm Trident DMG, and the defamation law firm Clare Locke, Blue Hill denied most of the allegations.

== See also ==
- List of Michelin-starred restaurants in New York City
