= David Bouley =

American chef and restaurateur (1953–2024)

- Born: May 27, 1953; Storrs, Connecticut, U.S.
- Died: February 13, 2024 (aged 70); Kent, Connecticut, U.S.
- Spouse: Nicole Bartelme
- Culinary career
- Cooking style: French cuisine
- Ratings
- TripAdvisor Travelers' Choice Award: Rated #1 in the USA, 2015, 14th in the World. Zagat: 29 out of 30, 2014-2015
- Current restaurants
- Bouley at Home, Bouley Test Kitchen, Bouley Botanical, Bouley New York, New York, United States
- Previous restaurants
- Brushstroke, Danube, Bouley Bakery Market, Upstairs
- Television shows
- PBS, Charlie Rose, David Letterman, CBS, Good Morning America
- Awardss
- Michelin stars, Officier de Bouche 2007, Washoku Ambassador Award 2015, Lifetime Achievement Awards from Columbia University, Honorary Ph.D. From The University of Connecticut, Knight in the Order of the agricultural Merit 2022, James Beard: Outstanding Restaurant 1991, Who's Who of Food & Beverage in America 1991, Best Chef in America Award 1994, Outstanding Chef 2000
- Website: davidbouley.com

David Bouley (May 27, 1953 – February 13, 2024) was an American chef. He was a sole owner and chef of restaurants in Tribeca, New York City, best known for his flagship restaurant, Bouley.

== Early life and education ==
Bouley was born on May 27, 1953, in Storrs, Connecticut. He attended the University of Connecticut, later completing the Cours de Civilisation Française at the Sorbonne in Paris.

== Career ==
Bouley worked in restaurants in Cape Cod, Santa Fe, New Mexico, France and Switzerland. While in Europe, after studies at the Sorbonne, he worked with chefs Roger Vergé, Paul Bocuse, Joël Robuchon, Gaston Lenôtre, Frédy Girardet, and Paul Haeberlin. Bouley returned to work in New York City in leading restaurants of the time, such as Le Cirque, Le Périgord, and La Côte Basque, as well as spent time as sous chef in a restaurant opened by Roger Vergé in San Francisco. In 1985, he became chef of Montrachet restaurant, awarded three stars in its first three weeks by the New York Times. In 1987, he became chef/owner of his namesake restaurant, Bouley, in Tribeca overlooking Duane Park, which earned a four-star review in the New York Times and won several James Beard Foundation awards, including Best Restaurant and Best Chef.

In 1997, Bouley moved and reopened as the Bouley Bakery. David Bouley was the first ‘Chef’ to ever be featured on the cover of the New York Times Magazine. In September 1999, Bouley opened Danube, a Viennese-inspired restaurant, located on Hudson Street, and authored his first book, East of Paris: The New Cuisines of Austria and the Danube. In 1999, the bakery earned four stars by The New York Times and two Michelin Stars before it changed locations in 2008 and was renamed Bouley Restaurant. His other restaurant, Danube, also received two Michelin stars. The Danube location was transformed into a new entity called Brushstroke Restaurant in Tribeca in 2011. Brushstroke was a combined effort between Bouley and the Tsuji Culinary Institute in Osaka, to share Japanese food culture and products while integrating American ingredients. It received two Michelin stars.

He was one of the first chefs in America to create tasting menus. He was sought out by those with auto-immune challenges. This approach won him Lifetime Achievement Awards from the Celiac Disease Center at Columbia University and the Rogosin Institute, an affiliate of New York-Presbyterian hospital.

In 2015, Bouley was the first non-Japanese citizen to garner the Japanese Cuisine (Washoku) Goodwill Ambassador honor by the Japanese Government.

In 2020, the French Government bestowed upon Bouley the honor of the title of Knight in the Order of the agricultural Merit (Ordre du Mérite de l’Agriculture et de l’Alimentation).

== Personal life ==
Bouley died from hereditary heart failure at his home in Kent, Connecticut, on February 13, 2024, at the age of 70. He is survived by his wife Nicole Bartelme. The couple met the last day, the last lunch of his namesake restaurant in 1996. Their wedding in the Loire Valley, France was in 2006.

== Restaurants ==
Bouley Bakery earned two Michelin Stars before it changed locations in 2008 and was renamed Bouley Restaurant. His other restaurant, Danube, also received two Michelin stars. The Danube location was transformed into a new entity called Brushstroke Restaurant.

Brushstroke Restaurant, located at 30 Hudson Street opened in April 2011, was a combined effort between Bouley and the Tsuji Culinary Institute in Osaka, to share Japanese food culture and products while integrating American ingredients.

Bouley Test Kitchen is a private event and testing learning center for visiting guest chefs and for developing recipes for the Bouley enterprises. The facilities were used by the American Team to launch the Bocuse d'Or Competition 2011. It was relocated from TriBeCa, lower Manhattan, to the Flatiron District in October 2017.

Bouley Botanical, on another corner in TriBeCa, located at 281 Church Street, is an event space which serves as an educational forum to develop creative healthy eating lifestyles through its lecture series: The Chef & The Doctor.

Bouley at Home is at 31 West 21st Street in the Flatiron District. It is a collaboration with Bulthaup Kitchen Design group based in Germany, with divisions across the United States and Europe.

== Awards ==
- Gohan Society's Washoku Ambassador Award ("Washoku" means "harmony of food" in Japanese)
- Officier de Bouche from Confrerie Gastronomique de la Marmitr d'OR 2007
- Lifetime Achievement Awards from the Celiac Disease Center at Columbia University
- Honorary Ph.D. From the University of Connecticut
- Knight in the Order of the agricultural Merit 2022
- James Beard: Outstanding Restaurant 1991, Who's Who of Food & Beverage in America 1991, Best Chef in America Award 1994, Outstanding Chef 2000

== Books ==
- East of Paris: The New Cuisines of Austria and the Danube (Ecco) Authors: David Bouley, Mario Lohninger, Melissa Clark (2003).
