= Blue Hill (restaurant) =

Restaurant in New York City

Family Meal at Blue Hill
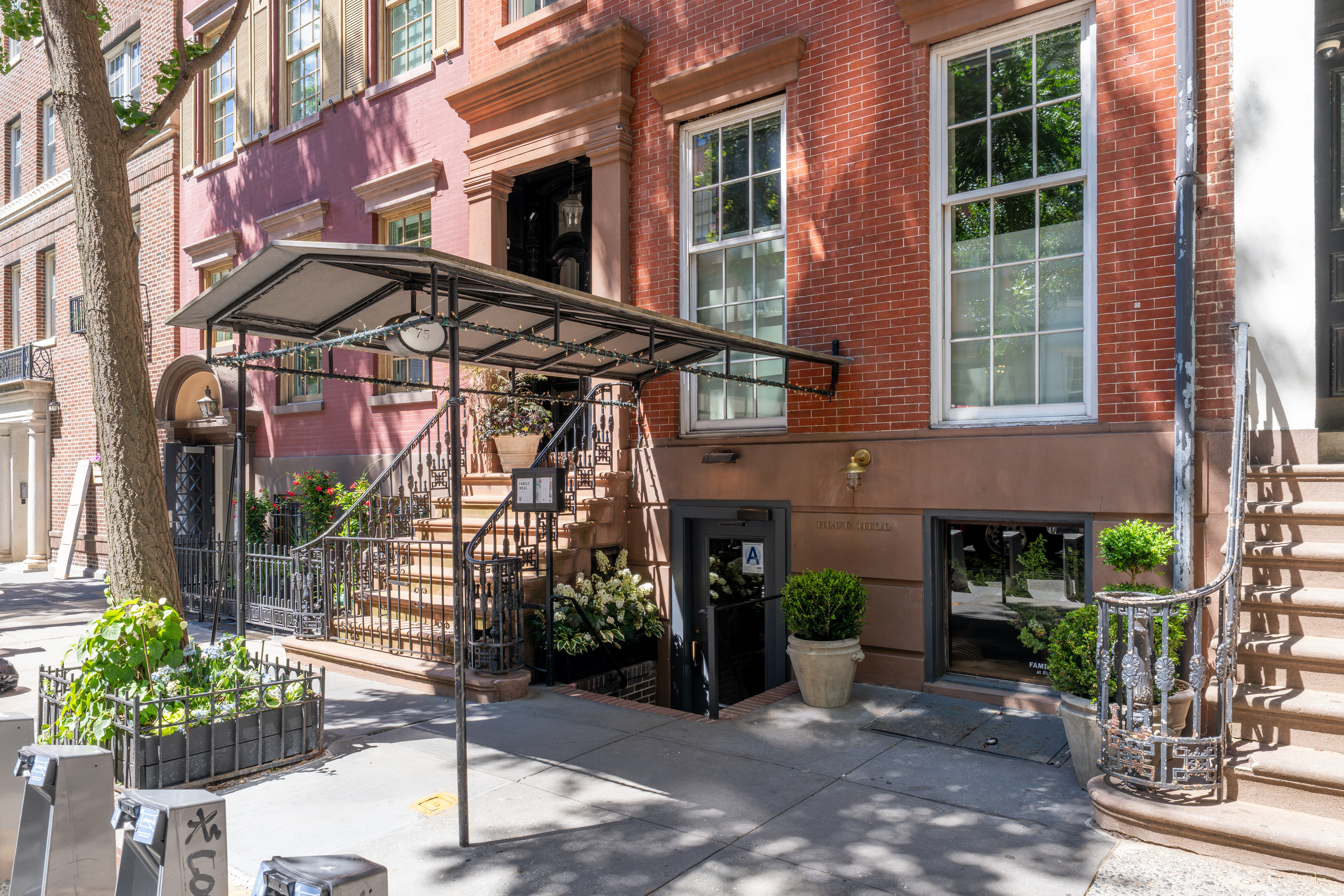
- Interactive map of Family Meal at Blue Hill

Restaurant information
- Established: April 2000; 26 years ago
- Owners: Dan, David, and Laureen Barber
- Rating: (Michelin Guide)
- Location: 75 Washington Place, Manhattan, New York City
- Coordinates: 40.73204°N 73.99964°W
- Website: www.bluehillfarm.com

Family Meal at Blue Hill, formerly known as Blue Hill and also known as Blue Hill New York, is a restaurant in New York City's Greenwich Village.

Blue Hill was established in April 2000 and is owned by Dan, David, and Laureen Barber. The restaurant uses some ingredients from the Stone Barns Center for Food & Agriculture in Pocantico Hills, New York, where Dan Barber owns another restaurant, Blue Hill at Stone Barns.

Blue Hill New York was lauded by the James Beard Foundation as an "Outstanding Restaurant" in 2013. The restaurant has also been reviewed by The New York Times and New York.

President Barack Obama and First Lady Michelle Obama dined there on May 30, 2009.

In May 2020 due to the COVID-19 pandemic in New York City, chef Dan Barber launched the resourcED program at Blue Hill which packaged ingredients from the Stone Barns farm and included directions for customers to cook the food themselves. The boxes were intended to keep the restaurant and their suppliers in business when they couldn't host diners.

== Notable people ==
- Tracy Malechek-Ezekiel

== See also ==
- List of Michelin-starred restaurants in New York City
