= Row 7 Seed Company =

American seed company

- Founded: 2018
- Founder: Dan Barber; Michael Mazourek; Matthew Goldfarb
- Website: row7seeds.com

Row 7 Seed Company is an American seed company founded in 2018 by chef Dan Barber, plant breeder Michael Mazourek, and seedsman Matthew Goldfarb. Row 7 was founded to connect chefs and consumers with high flavor varieties of produce, including squash, potatoes, and tomatoes.

Row 7's seeds include Sweet Garleek, a cross between garlic and leeks, Koginut Squash, and Badger Flame Beet. Its products have been sold in collaboration with Sweetgreen and Whole Foods.
