= Bar Uchū =

Defunct restaurant in New York City, U.S.

- Interactive map of Bar Uchū

Restaurant information
- Closed: December 30, 2021
- Location: 217 Eldridge Street, New York City, New York, 10002, United States
- Coordinates: 40°43′18.3″N 73°59′25″W

Bar Uchū was a restaurant in New York City. The restaurant had received a Michelin star.

== See also ==
- List of defunct restaurants of the United States
- List of Michelin-starred restaurants in New York City
