= Bouley =

- Interactive map of Bouley

Restaurant information
- Established: 1987; 39 years ago (at initial location); October 2008; 17 years ago (at second location)
- Closed: 1996; 30 years ago (at initial location); July 31, 2017; 8 years ago
- Owner: David Bouley
- Chef: David Bouley
- Food type: French
- Dress code: Jackets are required for men, at both lunch and dinner
- Rating: (Michelin Guide)
- Coordinates: 40.716967°N 74.008971°W
- Website: www.davidbouley.com

Bouley was a contemporary French restaurant located at 163 Duane Street (between Greenwich Street and Hudson Street), in Tribeca in Manhattan, in New York City. David Bouley was its owner and chef. It initially opened in 1987 at 154 Duane Street and was closed in 1996.

It reopened at its second location in October 2008 and closed in July 2017.

== Menu ==
The menu was modern French, and included dishes such as porcini flan with Dungeness crab and black truffle broth, wild salmon, and organic duckling.

== Decor ==
The romantic, candle-lit restaurant had vaulted ceilings brushed with gold leaf, an ancient French fireplace, and Impressionist paintings. A circular stone staircase led to a cellar for private parties.

== Reviews ==
In 2013, Zagats gave it a food rating of 28, and ranked it the best of 111 restaurants in Tribeca, and the 3rd-best restaurant in New York City. In 2015, Tripadvisor rated it the best restaurant in the United States.

== See also ==
- List of French restaurants
- List of Michelin-starred restaurants in New York City
