= List of Anna & Kristina's Grocery Bag episodes =

This is the episode list of the cooking / informative television series Anna & Kristina's Grocery Bag which airs on W Network in Canada and OWN in United States.

== Series overview ==
Season	Episodes	Originally released (Canada)		
Season	Episodes	First released	Last released	Network
1	13	September 3, 2008	November 26, 2008	W Network
2	26	January 7, 2009	October 21, 2009	W Network
3	26	September 22, 2010	April 20, 2011	W Network
4	13	September 4, 2012	November 27, 2012	W Network

== Episodes ==
=== Season 1 (2008) ===
No. overall	No. in season	Title	Written by	Original release date	Stamp of Approval?
1	1	"Mastering the Art of French Cooking, Volume 1"	Julia Child, Simone Beck, Louisette Bertholle	September 3, 2008	Yes
Guest chef: Alain Rayé, chef. Owner of La Régalade in Vancouver; Verdict – Anna: Buy; Kristina: Buy; Overall: Stamp of Approval (Buy)
2	2	"Pure Dessert"	Alice Medrich	September 10, 2008	No
Guest chef: Thomas Haas, chocolatier & pastry chef. Owner of Thomas Haas Fine Chocolates in North Vancouver, BC; Verdict – Anna: Pass; Kristina: Pass; Overall: Pass
3	3	"Cook with Jamie"	Jamie Oliver	September 17, 2008	Yes
Guest chef: David Wong, culinary arts instructor. Executive chef at Oru Cuisine in Fairmont Hotel Vancouver, Vancouver; Verdict – Anna: Buy; Kristina: Buy; Overall: Stamp of Approval (Buy)
4	4	"Mangoes and Curry Leaves"	Jeffrey Alford, Naomi Duguid	September 24, 2008	Yes
Guest chefs: Vikram Vij and Meeru Dhalwala, chefs and restaurateurs. Owners of Vij's Restaurant in Vancouver; Verdict – Anna: Buy; Kristina: Buy; Overall: Stamp of Approval (Buy)
5	5	"Betty Crocker's Cookbook"	Betty Crocker editors	October 1, 2008	No
Guest chef: Stella Shurety, chef. Owner of The Diner in Vancouver; Verdict – Anna: Pass; Kristina: Pass; Overall: Pass
6	6	"Nobu West"	Nobu Matsuhisa, Mark Edwards	October 8, 2008	No
Guest chef: Hidekazu Tojo, chef. Owner of Tojo's Restaurant in Vancouver; Verdict – Anna: Pass; Kristina: Pass; Overall: Pass
7	7	"Silver Palate Cookbook"	Julee Rosso, Sheila Lukins	October 15, 2008	No
Guest chef: Karen Barnaby, chef & author. Executive chef at The Fish House in Vancouver; Verdict – Anna: Pass; Kristina: Buy; Overall: Split Decision
8	8	"The New Lighthearted Cookbook"	Anne Lindsay	October 22, 2008	No
Guest chef: Eric Arrouze, chef & instructor. Organizer of onlineculinaryschool.net Verdict – Anna: Pass; Kristina: Pass; Overall: Pass
9	9	"How to Grill"	Steven Raichlen	October 29, 2008	Yes
Guest chef: Bob "BBQ Bob" Hasselbach, chef. Owner and chef of Roland's Pub in Whistler, BC; Verdict – Anna: Buy; Kristina: Buy; Overall: Stamp of Approval (Buy)
10	10	"The New InterCourses"	Martha Hopkins, Randall Lockridge	November 5, 2008	No
Guest chef: Daryl Nagata, chef. Executive chef at Pan Pacific Vancouver Hotel in Vancouver; Verdict – Anna: Pass; Kristina: Pass; Overall: Pass
11	11	"Everyday Italian"	Giada De Laurentiis	November 12, 2008	Yes
Guest chef: Gennaro Iorio, chef. Executive chef and co-owner of La Terrazza Italian Restaurant in Vancouver; Verdict – Anna: Buy; Kristina: Buy; Overall: Stamp of Approval (Buy)
12	12	"Martha Stewart Living Christmas Cookbook"	Martha Stewart Living Magazine editors	November 19, 2008	No
Guests: Sally Beattie, caterer based in Toronto, mother of presenter Anna Wallner; Amy Wallner, Laura Bincik and Lisa Samstag, sisters of presenter Anna Wallner. Verdict – Anna: Pass; Kristina: Pass; Overall: Pass
13	13	"New Food Fast"	Donna Hay	November 26, 2008	No
Guest chef: Dino Renaerts, chef. Owner of Beachside Forno in West Vancouver, BC. Verdict – Anna: Buy; Kristina: Pass; Overall: Split Decision

=== Season 2 (2009) ===
No. overall	No. in season	Title	Written by	Original release date	Stamp of Approval?
14	1	"The Best Light Recipe"	Cook's Illustrated	January 7, 2009	No
Guest chef: Julian Bond, chef & instructor. Executive Chef and CEO of Pacific Institute of Culinary Arts in Vancouver. Verdict – Anna: Pass; Kristina: Buy; Overall: Split Decision
15	2	"Essentials of Classic Italian Cooking"	Marcella Hazan	January 14, 2009	Yes
Guest chef: Umberto Menghi, restaurateur. President of Villa Delia Cooking School in Tuscany, Italy and owner of several restaurants in Vancouver and Whistler, BC. Verdict – Anna: Buy; Kristina: Buy; Overall: Stamp of Approval (Buy)
16	3	"The French Laundry Cookbook"	Thomas Keller, Deborah Jones	January 21, 2009	Yes
Guest chef: Michael Allemeier, chef. Executive chef at Outdoor Dining Terrace at Mission Hill Family Estate in Kelowna, BC. Verdict – Anna: Buy; Kristina: Buy; Overall: Stamp of Approval (Buy)
17	4	"Campground Cookery"	Brenda K. Kulibert	January 28, 2009	No
Guest chef: Chili Thom, chef & artist from Whistler, BC. Verdict – Anna: Pass; Kristina: Pass; Overall: Pass
18	5	"Rick Bayless's Mexican Kitchen"	Rick Bayless	February 4, 2009	Yes
Guest chef: Claudia Ibarrondo, chef. Executive chef at Tequila Kitchen in Vancouver. Verdict – Anna: Buy; Kristina: Buy; Overall: Stamp of Approval (Buy)
19	6	"Nigella Express: Good Food Fast"	Nigella Lawson	February 11, 2009	No
Guest chef: Stephan McIntyre, chef. Executive chef at Burgoo Bistro in Vancouver. Verdict – Anna: Pass; Kristina: Pass; Overall: Pass
20	7	"Deceptively Delicious"	Jessica Seinfeld	February 18, 2009	Yes
Guest chef: Mary MacIntyre, chef. Owner of Little Nest in Vancouver. Verdict – Anna: Buy; Kristina: Buy; Overall: Stamp of Approval (Buy)
21	8	"The Oprah Magazine Cookbook"	O: The Oprah Magazine editors	February 25, 2009	Yes
Guest chef: Melissa Craig, chef. Head chef at Bearfoot Bistro in Whistler, BC. Verdict – Anna: Buy; Kristina: Buy; Overall: Stamp of Approval (Buy)
22	9	"The Joy of Cooking, 75th Anniversary Edition"	Irma S. Rombauer, Marion Rombauer Becker, Ethan Becker	March 4, 2009	Yes
Guest chef: Tom Douglas, restaurateur and caterer based in Seattle. Verdict – Anna: Buy; Kristina: Buy; Overall: Stamp of Approval (Buy)
23	10	"Thai Food"	David Thompson	March 11, 2009	No
Guest chef: Brian Marchesi, chef. Owner of Chada Thai Fine Cuisine in Vancouver. Verdict – Anna: Buy; Kristina: Pass; Overall: Split Decision; Note: Brian Marchesi died on October 2, 2009, 6 months after the initial broadcast of the episode. Subsequent re-runs of this episode features a graphic at the end dedicated to his memory.
24	11	"Garlic, Garlic, Garlic"	Linda Griffith, Fred Griffith	March 18, 2009	No
Guest chef: Andrea Froncillo, chef. Executive chef at The Stinking Rose in San Francisco. Verdict – Anna: Pass; Kristina: Buy; Overall: Split Decision
25	12	"Jewish Home Cooking"	Arthur Schwartz	March 25, 2009	No
Guest chef: Jeff Nathan, chef. Owner of Abigael's on Broadway in New York City. Verdict – Anna: Pass; Kristina: Buy; Overall: Split Decision
26	13	"Vegetarian Meals"	Good Housekeeping editors	April 1, 2009	No
Guest: Yves Potvin, entrepreneur. Owner of Yves Veggie Cuisine in Vancouver. Verdict – Anna: Pass; Kristina: Pass; Overall: Pass
27	14	"Fat: An Appreciation of a Misunderstood Ingredient, with Recipes"	Jennifer McLagan	June 3, 2009	Yes
Guest chef: Andrey Durbach, chef. Executive chef at La Buca, Pied-a-Terre Bistro, and Cafeteria Vancouver in Vancouver. Verdict – Anna: Buy; Kristina: Buy; Overall: Stamp of Approval (Buy)
28	15	"The Best of the Best and More: Volume 1"	The Ladies of The Best of Bridge	June 10, 2009	No
Guest: Vicki Gabereau, television personality and cookbook author. Verdict – Anna: Buy; Kristina: Pass; Overall: Split Decision
29	16	"The Cake Bible"	Rose Levy Beranbaum	June 17, 2009	Yes
Guest chef: Sylvia Weinstock, cake designer based in New York City. Verdict – Anna: Buy; Kristina: Buy; Overall: Stamp of Approval (Buy)
30	17	"Barefoot Contessa: Back to Basics"	Ina Garten	June 24, 2009	Yes
Guest chef: Jamie Maw, food critic based in Vancouver. Verdict – Anna: Buy; Kristina: Buy; Overall: Stamp of Approval (Buy)
31	18	"Entertaining with Booze"	Ryan Jennings and David Steele	July 1, 2009	No
Guests: Neil Ingram, restaurateur. Co-owner and sommelier at Boneta Restaurant. Michaela Morris, wine consultant. Co-owner of the wine consulting company House Wine. Both based in Vancouver. Verdict – Anna: Pass; Kristina: Pass; Overall: Pass
32	19	"The Flexitarian Table"	Peter Berley	July 8, 2009	Yes
Guest chef: Nico Schuermans, chef. Executive chef at Chambar Restaurant in Vancouver. Verdict – Anna: Buy; Kristina: Buy; Overall: Stamp of Approval (Buy)
33	20	"Small Bites"	Jennifer Joyce	September 2, 2009	No
Guest chef: Jonathan Chovancek, chef & caterer. Chef de Cuisine at Culinary Capers in Vancouver. Verdict – Anna: Pass; Kristina: Pass; Overall: Pass
34	21	"The Chinese Kitchen"	Eileen Yin-Fei Lo	September 9, 2009	No
Guest chef: Martin Yan, chef & television personality. Host of cooking programme Yan Can Cook. Verdict – Anna: Pass; Kristina: Buy; Overall: Split Decision
35	22	"Alinea"	Grant Achatz	September 16, 2009	No
Guest chef: Warren Geraghty, chef. Executive chef at West Restaurant in Vancouver. Verdict – Anna: Pass; Kristina: Pass; Overall: Pass
36	23	"Gourmet Magazine"	Gourmet Magazine editors	September 23, 2009	Yes
Guest chef: Pino Posteraro, chef. Owner and head chef at Cioppino's Mediterranean Grill & Enoteca in Vancouver. Verdict – Anna: Buy; Kristina: Buy; Overall: Stamp of Approval (Buy)
37	24	"A Cowboy in the Kitchen"	John Westerdahl, Robb Walsh, Dick Patrick	September 30, 2009	No
Guest chef: Terry Chandler, chef. Owner and head chef at Fred’s Texas Café in Fort Worth, TX. Verdict – Anna: Buy; Kristina: Pass; Overall: Split Decision
38	25	"A Good Catch"	Jill Lambert	October 7, 2009	No
Guest chef: Robert Clark, chef. Executive chef at C Restaurant in Vancouver. Verdict – Anna: Pass; Kristina: Buy; Overall: Split Decision
39	26	"Chef Daniel Boulud: Cooking in New York City"	Daniel Boulud	October 21, 2009	Yes
Guest chefs: Daniel Boulud, chef, television personality and restaurateur. Also author of cookbook tested in this episode. Based in New York City. Stephane Istel, executive chef at DB Bistro Moderne in Vancouver. Dale MacKay, executive chef at Lumière in Vancouver. Verdict – Anna: Buy; Kristina: Buy; Overall: Stamp of Approval (Buy)

=== Season 3 (2010–11) ===
No. overall	No. in season	Title	Written by	Original release date	Stamp of Approval?
40	1	"Lucinda's Authentic Jamaican Kitchen"	Lucinda Scala Quinn	September 22, 2010	Yes
Guest chef: Prince Rowe, chef and restaurateur. Owner and host of Kingston 11 Reggae Café in North Vancouver, BC. Verdict – Anna: Buy; Kristina: Buy; Overall: Stamp of Approval (Buy)
41	2	"Diners, Drive-Ins and Dives"	Guy Fieri	September 29, 2010	No
Guest chef: Brian Boitano, Olympic figure skating gold medalist and television personality. Host of cooking programme What Would Brian Boitano Make? on Food Network. Verdict – Anna: Pass; Kristina: Pass; Overall: Pass
42	3	"How to Cook Everything: Completely Revised 10th Anniversary Edition"	Mark Bittman	October 6, 2010	No
Guest chef: Frank Pabst, chef. Executive chef at Blue Water Café in Vancouver. Verdict – Anna: Pass; Kristina: Buy; Overall: Split Decision
43	4	"The Skinnygirl Dish"	Bethenny Frankel	October 13, 2010	No
Guest chef: Manouschka Guerrier, chef, caterer and television personality. Co-host of Private Chefs of Beverly Hills on Food Network. Verdict – Anna: Pass; Kristina: Pass; Overall: Pass
44	5	"Bon Appétit, Y'all"	Virginia Willis	October 20, 2010	Yes
Guest chef: Sallie Ann Robinson, chef and cookbook author, based in Daufuskie Island, SC. Verdict – Anna: Buy; Kristina: Buy; Overall: Stamp of Approval (Buy)
45	6	"The New Moosewood Cookbook"	Mollie Katzen	October 27, 2010	No
Guest chef: Lisa Ahier, chef. Co-owner of Sobo Restaurant in Tofino, BC. Verdict – Anna: Buy; Kristina: Pass; Overall: Split Decision
46	7	"Grand Livre De Cuisine"	Alain Ducasse, Frédéric Robert	November 3, 2010	No
Guest chef: Thierry Busset, pastry chef. Chef Patissier at CinCin in Vancouver. Verdict – Anna: Pass; Kristina: Pass; Overall: Pass
47	8	"Three Sisters Around the Greek Table"	Betty Bakopoulos, Eleni Bakopoulos, Samantha Bakopoulos	November 10, 2010	No
Guest chef: Harry Kambolis, restaurateur. Owner of Raincity Grill, C Restaurant, and Nu Restaurant in Vancouver. Verdict – Anna: Pass; Kristina: Buy; Overall: Split Decision
48	9	"Bite Me"	Julie Albert, Lisa Gnat	November 17, 2010	No
Guest chef: Sam Talbot, chef and television personality. Executive Chef of the Mondrian SoHo in New York City. Season 2 semi-finalist of Top Chef on Bravo Network. Verdict – Anna: Pass; Kristina: Pass; Overall: Pass
49	10	"Williams Sonoma Christmas Entertaining"	Georgeanne Brennan	November 24, 2010	No
Guests: Caren McSherry, chef, cookbook author and instructor. Owner of The Gourmet Warehouse. Kurtis Kolt, sommelier. Colin Upright, designer and party planner. CEO and Senior Creative Director of Upright Decor & Event Design. All based in Vancouver. Verdict – Anna: Pass; Kristina: Pass; Overall: Pass
50	11	"Gordon Ramsay's Family Fare"	Gordon Ramsay	January 5, 2011	Yes
Guest chef: Rob Feenie, chef and television personality. Food Architect at Cactus Club Cafe in Vancouver. Previously won an episode of Iron Chef America against Masaharu Morimoto on Food Network. Hosted cooking series New Classics with Chef Rob Feenie on Food Network Canada. Verdict – Anna: Buy; Kristina: Buy; Overall: Stamp of Approval (Buy)
51	12	"Where People Feast"	Annie Watts	January 12, 2011	No
Guest chef: Ben Genaille, chef and instructor. Head of the Aboriginal Culinary program at Vancouver Community College in Vancouver. Verdict – Anna: Pass; Kristina: Pass; Overall: Pass
52	13	"Best of Croatian Cooking"	Liliana Pavicic, Gordana Pirker-Mosher	January 19, 2011	No
Guests: Dr. Jasenka Matisic, mother of host Kristina Matisic. Zdenka Zivkovic, best friend of Dr. Matisic. Verdict – Anna: Pass; Kristina: Pass; Overall: Pass
53	14	"Best British Dishes"	Marguerite Patten	January 26, 2011	No
Guest chef: Andrew Nutter, chef and television personality. Owner of Nutters in Manchester, England. Hosted cooking series Utter Nutter on Channel 5 in UK. Verdict – Anna: Buy; Kristina: Pass; Overall: Split Decision
54	15	"The Pleasures of Cooking for One"	Judith Jones	February 2, 2011	Yes
Guest chef: Quang Dang, chef. Executive chef at Diva at the Met in Vancouver. Verdict – Anna: Buy; Kristina: Buy; Overall: Stamp of Approval (Buy)
55	17	"Bobby Flay's Mesa Grill Cookbook"	Bobby Flay	February 9, 2011	Yes
Guest chef: Stuart Irving, chef. Owner & executive chef at Cobre Restaurant in Vancouver. Verdict – Anna: Buy; Kristina: Buy; Overall: Stamp of Approval (Buy)
56	16	"The River Cottage Meat Book"	Hugh Fearnley-Whittingstall	February 16, 2011	Yes
Guest chef: Robert Belcham, chef. Owner of Refuel Restaurant and Campagnolo Restaurant in Vancouver. Verdict – Anna: Buy; Kristina: Buy; Overall: Stamp of Approval (Buy)
57	18	"Ratio: The Simple Codes Behind the Craft of Everyday Cooking"	Michael Ruhlman	February 23, 2011	Yes
Guest chef: David Robertson, chef, food stylist & culinary instructor. Co-founder and instructor at Dirty Apron Cooking School in Vancouver. Verdict – Anna: Buy; Kristina: Buy; Overall: Stamp of Approval (Buy)
58	19	"A16: Food + Wine"	Nate Appleman, Shelley Lindgren	March 2, 2011	Yes
Guest chefs: Frank Falcinelli and Frank Castronovo, chefs, restaurateurs and cookbook authors. Owners of Frankies 457 Spuntino in Brooklyn. Verdict – Anna: Buy; Kristina: Buy; Overall: Stamp of Approval (Buy)
59	20	"The Ski House Cookbook"	Tina Anderson, Sarah Pinneo	March 9, 2011	No
Guest chef: James Walt, chef. Executive chef at Araxi Restaurant in Whistler, BC. A position with Araxi Restaurant was the grand prize for the sixth season of the FOX programme "Hell's Kitchen". Verdict – Anna: Pass; Kristina: Pass; Overall: Pass
60	21	"Izakaya: The Japanese Pub Cookbook"	Mark Robinson	March 16, 2011	Yes
Guest chef: Koji Zenimaru, chef. Executive chef at Kingyo Izakaya in Vancouver. Verdict – Anna: Buy; Kristina: Buy; Overall: Stamp of Approval (Buy)
61	22	"Anthony Bourdain's Les Halles Cookbook"	Anthony Bourdain	March 23, 2011	Yes
Guest chef: Thierry Rautureau, chef and restaurateur. Chef and owner of Rover’s Restaurant and Luc Restaurant in Seattle. Verdict – Anna: Buy; Kristina: Buy; Overall: Stamp of Approval (Buy)
62	23	"Spécialités de la Maison"	The American Friends for France, Christine Schwartz Hartley	March 30, 2011	No
Guest chef: J.P. Amateau, chef and ex-stuntman; son of director Rod Amateau. Executive chef of Musso & Frank Grill in Los Angeles. Verdict – Anna: Pass; Kristina: Pass; Overall: Pass
63	24	"Canyon Ranch: Nourish"	Scott Uehlein, Staff of Canyon Ranch	April 6, 2011	Yes
Guest chef: Jesse Brune, chef, personal trainer and television personality. Co-host of cooking programme Private Chefs of Beverly Hills on Food Network. Previously a personal trainer on reality show Work Out on Bravo. Verdict – Anna: Buy; Kristina: Buy; Overall: Stamp of Approval (Buy)
64	25	"Jamie Oliver: 20 Minute Meals"	Jamie Oliver	April 13, 2011	No
Guest chef: Scott Jaeger, chef and restaurateur. Owner of The Pear Tree Restaurant in Burnaby, BC. Vice Conseiller Culinaire of Confrérie de la Chaîne des Rôtisseurs. Previous competitor and judge at the Bocuse d'Or. Verdict – Anna: Pass; Kristina: Buy; Overall: Split Decision
65	26	"My Father's Daughter"	Gwyneth Paltrow	April 20, 2011	Yes
Guest chef: Brian Malarkey, chef. Owner of Searsucker in San Diego. Season 3 finalist of Top Chef on Bravo Network. Verdict – Anna: Buy; Kristina: Buy; Overall: Stamp of Approval (Buy)

=== Season 4 (2012) ===
No. overall	No. in season	Title	Written by	Original release date	Stamp of Approval?
66	1	"100 Recipes Every Woman Should Know"	Cindi Leive	September 4, 2012	Yes
Guest chef: Fabio Viviani; chef, restaurateur, television personality. Owner and of Cafe Firenze and Osteria Firenze in Los Angeles. Viviani was also a finalist on the fifth season of the television reality series Top Chef on Bravo. Verdict – Anna: Buy; Kristina: Buy; Overall: Stamp of Approval (Buy)
67	2	"Absolutely Chocolate"	Editors of Fine Cooking Magazine	September 11, 2012	Yes
Guest chef: Bruno Feldeisen; chef. Pastry chef of Yew Restaurant and Bar at Four Seasons Hotels and Resorts in Vancouver. Verdict – Anna: Buy; Kristina: Buy; Overall: Stamp of Approval (Buy)
68	3	"Food Trucks"	Heather Shouse	September 18, 2012	No
Guest chef: Jay Robins; chef and caterer. Owner and head chef of the food truck Green Machine in Vancouver. Verdict – Anna: Pass; Kristina: Pass; Overall: Pass
69	4	"The Babbo Cookbook"	Mario Batali	September 25, 2012	Yes
Guest chef: Lucais Syme; chef. Co-owner and co-head chef at La Quercia Restaurant in Vancouver. Verdict – Anna: Buy; Kristina: Buy; Overall: Stamp of Approval (Buy)
70	5	"The Essential Pépin"	Jacques Pépin	October 2, 2012	No
Guest chef: Ned Bell; chef and television personality. Executive chef of Yew Restaurant and Bar at Four Seasons Hotels and Resorts in Vancouver and co-host of Cook Like a Chef on Food Network Canada. Verdict – Anna: Pass; Kristina: Buy; Overall: Split Decision
71	6	"My Pizza"	Jim Lahey, Rick Flaste	October 9, 2012	No
Guest chef: Tony Gemignani; chef and acclaimed pizzaiolo. Owner of Tony's Pizza Napoletana, Tony’s Coal Fired Pizza, and Pizza Rock in San Francisco. Verdict – Anna: Pass; Kristina: Buy; Overall: Split Decision
72	7	"Mourad, New Moroccan"	Mourad Lahlou	October 16, 2012	Yes
Guest chef: Chafaï Choumicha; chef, cookbook author and television personality based in Marrakesh. Host of cooking programmes Chhiwat Bladi and Chhiwat Choumicha on 2M TV. Verdict – Anna: Buy; Kristina: Buy; Overall: Stamp of Approval (Buy)
73	8	"Home Cooking with Trisha Yearwood"	Trisha Yearwood	October 23, 2012	No
Guest chef: Park Heffelfinger; chef and restaurateur. Co-owner of Memphis Blues Restaurant in Vancouver; director and co-founder of the Vancouver Wine Academy. Verdict – Anna: Pass; Kristina: Pass; Overall: Pass
74	9	"Artisanal Gluten-Free Cooking"	Kelli Bronski, Peter Bronski	October 30, 2012	No
Guest chef: Ray Porcellato; baker. Founder of gluten-free bakery Cloud 9 Specialty Bakery in New Westminster, BC. Verdict – Anna: Pass; Kristina: Pass; Overall: Pass
75	10	"The Family Meal: Home Cooking with Ferran Adria"	Ferran Adrià	November 6, 2012	Yes
Guest chef: David Hawksworth; chef. Owner and executive chef of Hawksworth Restaurant at the Rosewood Hotel Georgia in Vancouver. Verdict – Anna: Buy; Kristina: Buy; Overall: Stamp of Approval (Buy)
76	11	"The Engine 2 Diet"	Rip Esselstyn	November 13, 2012	No
Guest chef: Harley Pasternak; personal trainer, author, and television personality based in Los Angeles. Founder of the 5-Factor Diet, a popular diet and fitness lifestyle, and co-hosted talk show The Revolution on ABC. Verdict – Anna: Pass; Kristina: Pass; Overall: Pass
77	12	"Whitewater Cooks with Friends"	Shelley Adams	November 20, 2012	Yes
Guest chef: Anthony Sedlak; chef, restaurateur, and television personality based in North Vancouver, BC. Winner of Superstar Chef Challenge II on Food Network Canada, and subsequently hosted cooking show The Main on the network. Verdict – Anna: Buy; Kristina: Buy; Overall: Stamp of Approval (Buy); Note: Anthony Sedlak died shortly after the taping of this episode, marking this his final television work.
78	13	"The Treasury of Newfoundland Dishes"	The Home Economics Association	November 27, 2012	No
Guest chef: Jeremy Charles; chef. Executive chef at Raymonds Restaurant in St. John's, NL. Verdict – Anna: Buy; Kristina: Pass; Overall: Split Decision

== Result summary ==
Season	Both A&K: Pass	Split Decision (Anna: Buy)	Split Decision (Kristina: Buy)	A&K Stamp of Approval
1	6 (46.2%)	1 (7.6%)	1 (7.6%)	5 (38.5%)
2	6 (23.1%)	3 (11.5%)	5 (19.2%)	12 (46.2%)
3	9 (34.6%)	2 (7.7%)	3 (11.5%)	12 (46.2%)
4	4 (30.8%)	1 (7.7%)	2 (15.4%)	6 (46.1%)
Overall	25 (32.0%)	7 (9.0%)	11 (14.1%)	35 (44.9%)
