= Anna & Kristina's Grocery Bag =

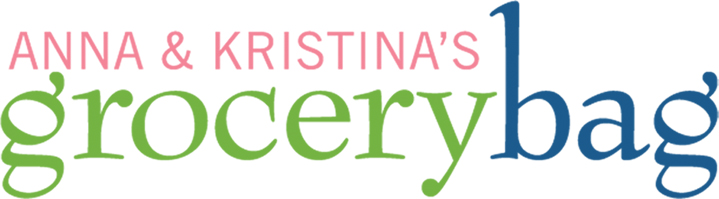
- Title card of programme.
- Genre: Infotainment, Cooking show
- Created by: Anna Wallner; Kristina Matisic
- Developed by: Anna Wallner; Kristina Matisic
- Directed by: Nicholas Treeshin; Erin Redden; Jennifer Little; Michael Margolis; Jordan Kawchuk
- Creative director: Lionel Goddard
- Presented by: Anna Wallner; Kristina Matisic
- Theme music composer: Graeme Coleman
- Country of origin: Canada
- Original language: English
- No. of seasons: 4
- No. of episodes: 78 (list of episodes)

Production
- Executive producers: Anna Wallner; Kristina Matisic
- Producers: Joyce Sawa; Heather Hawthorn-Doyle
- Production locations: Vancouver, British Columbia, Canada
- Cinematography: Carl Alcock
- Editors: Robert Lawrenson; Erin Parks; Jennifer Lee; Michael Ellis; Jessica McKee
- Camera setup: Multi-camera
- Running time: 30 minutes (including commercials)
- Production companies: Worldwide Bag Media, Inc.

Original release
- Network: W Network (seasons 1-3); OWN (Canada) (season 4)
- Release: September 3, 2008 – November 27, 2012

Anna & Kristina's Grocery Bag is a Canadian television series that aired on the W Network and OWN Network in Canada, as well as 13 other countries around the world. Similar to the series The Shopping Bags, produced and hosted by Anna Wallner and Kristina Matisic, this series focuses on the kitchen, putting cookbooks, kitchen products, and cooking ingredients to the test.

== Synopsis ==
Each episodes focuses on hosts Wallner and Matisic testing one cookbook. They make several recipes, usually consisting a full meal from appetizer to dessert (except for speciality cookbooks such as a dessert cookbook) for a special guest chef (and occasionally, non-chefs) while explicitly following the book's recipes & instructions. The meal is prepared within a strict time limit which ends when the guest chef arrives on set, and is determined by the preparation/cooking time listed in the cookbook. At the end of the program, each host will declare the book a "Buy" or a "Pass" depending on whether they feel the book has delivered in its promise and purpose based both on the cook day experience and their individual pre-testing of the cookbook. If both hosts give the book a "Buy", the cookbook will earn the "A&K Stamp of Approval".

Throughout each episode, Wallner & Matisic also perform product testings of several kitchen gadgets and/or food items to provide a side-by-side comparison between different brands, make or variety, similar to how they tested products on their previous show, The Shopping Bags. These product tests usually pertain to ingredients or tools they are using in that episode. In addition, the episodes are intertwined with interviews with the guest chefs, who share their cooking tips and tricks.

== Episodes & testing results ==
=== Series overview ===
Season	Episodes	Originally aired	
Season	Episodes	First aired	Last aired
1	13	September 3, 2008	November 26, 2008
2	26	January 7, 2009	October 21, 2009
3	26	September 22, 2010	April 20, 2011
4	13	September 4, 2012	November 27, 2012

=== List of books with Stamp of Approval ===
Below is a complete list of cookbooks that have received the Official "A&K Stamp of Approval" by having both Wallner and Matisic give the book a Buy rating at the end of the episode.

Season	Book title	Book author(s)	Cuisine type or Genre
1	Mastering the Art of French Cooking, Volume 1	Julia Child, Simone Beck, Louisette Bertholle	French cuisine
1	Cooking with Jamie	Jamie Oliver	Fresh & Organic cooking
1	Mangoes and Curry Leaves	Jeffrey Alford, Naomi Duguid	Indian cuisine
1	How to Grill	Steven Raichlen	Grilling, Barbecue
1	Everyday Italian	Giada De Laurentiis	Italian cuisine
2	Essentials of Classic Italian Cooking	Marcella Hazan	Italian cuisine
2	The French Laundry Cookbook	Thomas Keller, Deborah Jones	French cuisine
2	Rick Bayless's Mexican Kitchen	Rick Bayless	Mexican cuisine
2	Deceptively Delicious	Jessica Seinfeld	Kid-friendly dishes
2	The Oprah Magazine Cookbook	O: The Oprah Magazine editors	General cooking
2	The Joy of Cooking, 75th Anniversary Edition	Irma S. Rombauer, Marion Rombauer Becker, Ethan Becker	General cooking
2	Fat: An Appreciation of a Misunderstood Ingredient, with Recipes	Jennifer McLagan	Cooking with Fat
2	The Cake Bible	Rose Levy Beranbaum	Baking, Cakes, Cake decorating
2	Barefoot Contessa: Back to Basics	Ina Garten	General cooking
2	The Flexitarian Table	Peter Berley	Flexitarianism, Vegetarian cuisine
2	Gourmet Magazine	Gourmet Magazine editors	Magazine, General cooking
2	Chef Daniel Boulud: Cooking in New York City	Daniel Boulud	French cuisine
3	Lucinda's Authentic Jamaican Kitchen	Lucinda Scala Quinn	Jamaican cuisine
3	Bon Appétit, Y'all	Virginia Willis	Southern US cuisine
3	Gordon Ramsay's Family Fare	Gordon Ramsay	General cooking
3	The Pleasures of Cooking for One	Judith Jones	Cooking for one person
3	Bobby Flay's Mesa Grill Cookbook	Bobby Flay	Southwestern US cuisine
3	The River Cottage Meat Book	Hugh Fearnley-Whittingstall	Cooking with meat
3	Ratio: The Simple Codes Behind the Craft of Everyday Cooking	Michael Ruhlman	Ingredient ratios in cooking
3	A16: Food + Wine	Nate Appleman, Shelley Lindgren	Italian cuisine, Neapolitan cuisine
3	Izakaya: The Japanese Pub Cookbook	Mark Robinson	Japanese cuisine, Izakaya food
3	Anthony Bourdain's Les Halles Cookbook	Anthony Bourdain	French Bistro food
3	Canyon Ranch: Nourish	Scott Uehlein, Staff of Canyon Ranch	Healthy eating, Spa food
3	My Father's Daughter	Gwyneth Paltrow	Healthy eating, General cooking
4	100 Recipes Every Woman Should Know	Cindi Leive	General cooking
4	Absolutely Chocolate	Fine Cooking Magazine editors	Desserts, Dishes with chocolate
4	The Babbo Cookbook	Mario Batali	Italian cuisine
4	Mourad, New Moroccan	Mourad Lahlou	Moroccan cuisine
4	The Family Meal: Home Cooking with Ferran Adria	Ferran Adrià	General cooking
4	Whitewater Cooks with Friends	Shelley Adams	General cooking, Al fresco dining

== "Three Sisters Around the Greek Table" episode ==
After the airing of the season 3 episode "Three Sisters Around the Greek Table" on November 10, 2010, where the book received a "Split Decision" rating with a "Buy" vote from Matisic and a "Pass" vote from Wallner, the authors of the cookbook, Betty, Eleni, and Samantha Bakopoulos posted a blog entry entitled Don't believe everything you see on T.V. – A&K stamp of what???, voicing their opinions on the results of the show. In the entry, they claim that their cookbook was misrepresented by Wallner & Matisic due to the two's lack of cooking knowledge, expertise, and precision as several mistakes happened during the course of the program. They also questioned the show's handling of the cooking time limit and the actual legitimacy of the "A&K Stamp of Approval". They ultimately called the episode sensationalized for the amusement of television audiences while giving their cookbook a negative image through the omissions and errors in cooking.

On November 14, 2010, Wallner & Matisic posted a note on the show's Facebook page entitled Open Letter to the Bakopoulos Sisters (Three Sisters Around The Greek Table) explaining their reasoning behind giving the cookbook the Split Decision result which included reviews from the show's testing group panelists. The note explained that the results were based on months of cookbook testing by multiple panelists as well as the cook day results. It also mentioned that the cooking mistakes on the show, while included for entertainment value, did not ultimately reflect on the judging of the cookbook itself. The omitted cooking steps were edited out post-production due to time restrictions, but not missed during the cooking process. Wallner & Matisic noted that they posted the open letter on their Facebook page because they could not successfully post the comment on the blog entry by the cookbook authors.

The Bakopoulos sisters have since removed the original blog entry from their website.

== Awards and nominations ==
Year	Award	Category	Nominee(s)	Result	Notes
2009	Gemini Awards	Best Host in a Lifestyle/Practical Information, or Performing Arts Program or Series	Anna Wallner, Kristina Matisic	Nominated	For the episode Mastering the Art of French Cooking
2009	Leo Awards	Best Information or Lifestyle Series	Season 1	Nominated	
2009	Leo Awards	Best Host(s) in an Information or Lifestyle Series	Anna Wallner, Kristina Matisic	Nominated	For the episode Mangoes & Curry Leaves
2009	Leo Awards	Best Direction in an Information or Lifestyle Series	Michael Margolis	Nominated	For the episode Mangoes & Curry Leaves
2009	Leo Awards	Best Cinematography in an Information or Lifestyle Series	Carl Alcock	Nominated	For the episode Mangoes & Curry Leaves
2009	Leo Awards	Best Cinematography in an Information or Lifestyle Series	Carl Alcock	Nominated	For the episode Mastering the Art of French Cooking
2010	Gemini Awards	Best Host in a Lifestyle/Practical Information, or Performing Arts Program or Series	Anna Wallner, Kristina Matisic	Nominated	For the episode Cowboy in the Kitchen
2010	Leo Awards	Best Information or Lifestyle Series	Season 2	Nominated	
2010	Leo Awards	Best Host(s) in an Information or Lifestyle Series	Anna Wallner, Kristina Matisic	Won	For the episode Cowboy in the Kitchen
2010	Leo Awards	Best Direction in an Information or Lifestyle Series	Jennifer Little	Won	For the episode Essentials of Classic Italian Cooking
2010	Leo Awards	Best Cinematography in an Information or Lifestyle Series	Carl Alcock	Won	For the episode Essentials of Classic Italian Cooking
2011	Gemini Awards	Best Lifestyle/Practical Information Series	Season 3	Nominated	
2011	Gemini Awards	Best Direction in a Lifestyle/Practical Information Program or Series	Jordan Kawchuk, Erin Redden	Nominated	For the episode Best British Dishes
2011	Gemini Awards	Best Host in a Lifestyle/Practical Information, or Performing Arts Program or Series	Anna Wallner, Kristina Matisic	Nominated	For the episode Best British Dishes

== Production and distribution ==
The show began broadcasting in 2008, and is filmed and produced in Vancouver, British Columbia, Canada by Worldwide Bag Media Inc., and is distributed by Picture Box Distribution. The series premiere episode, Mastering the Art of French Cooking was nominated for a 2009 Gemini Award in the category for "Best Host in a Lifestyle/Practical Information, or Performing Arts Program or Series".

In 2010, Picture Box Distribution announced that it had reached a deal with OWN: Oprah Winfrey Network which picked up the first three seasons, marking the show's debut in the United States.

Season 4 started filming in April 2012 and premiered on September 4, 2012. It was announced that show will shift from the W Network to its sister channel, Oprah Winfrey Network (Canada) starting this season. However, a deal has yet to be reached for the American broadcast of season 4.

=== International Syndication ===
International syndication
Country / Region	Name	Television Network	Dubbing / Subtitles
Canada (Quebec)	Anna & Kristina : recettes à l'essai (English: Anna & Kristina: Test Recipes)	Zeste	French dubbing
Finland	Annan ja Kristinan koekeittiö (English: Anna & Kristina's Test Kitchen)	MTV3	Finnish dubbing
Hong Kong	Anna & Kristina's Grocery Bag	Li TV	English
Hungary	A jó szakácskönyv receptje (English: A Good Cookbook Recipe)	TV Paprika	Hungarian dubbing
Indonesia	Anna & Kristina's Grocery Bag	Li TV	English
Israel	Anna & Kristina's Grocery Bag	Ananey - Israeli Food Channel	English
Italy		Beep Omnimedia	
Malaysia	Anna & Kristina's Grocery Bag	Li TV	English
Poland		Canal+ Poland	Polish subtitles
Singapore	Anna & Kristina's Grocery Bag	Li TV	English
United States	Anna & Kristina's Grocery Bag	OWN: Oprah Winfrey Network	English
Vietnam	Cẩm nang nội trợ (English: Guide of Housewives)	K+PC	Vietnamese dubbing

== See also ==
- The Shopping Bags
- Anna & Kristina's Beauty Call
