= Jane Kramer =

American journalist (born 1938)

Jane Kramer (born August 7, 1938) is an American journalist. She began her writing career at the Village Voice, moving to The New Yorker in 1964, where she remains a staff writer. Her books Allen Ginsberg in America (1969) and Honor to the Bride (1970), based on her travels in Morocco, were developed from long-form New Yorker articles.

Beginning in the 1970s, much of Kramer's reporting has been from various European locales, and since 1981 she has written a regular "Letter from Europe" for the New Yorker. Books based upon her European reporting include Europeans (1988) and The Politics of Memory (1996). Other books are The Last Cowboy (1977) and Lone Patriot (2003), the latter about a militia in the American West. Both books also explore downward mobility in America.

== Biography ==
Kramer was born in Providence, Rhode Island. She has an A.B. in English from Vassar College and an M.A. in English from Columbia University.

For the first paperback edition of The Last Cowboy, Kramer received a 1981 National Book Award for Nonfiction. (Note: This was the award for paperback "General Nonfiction". From 1980 to 1983 in National Book Awards history there were several nonfiction subcategories including General Nonfiction, with dual hardcover and paperback awards in most categories. Most of the paperback award-winners were reprints, including this one.)

Her other awards include an Emmy Award for documentary filmmaking, National Magazine Award, Front Page Award, and the fr:Prix européen de l'essai Charles Veillon.

Kramer is a fellow of the American Academy of Arts and Sciences, a member of the Council on Foreign Relations and a founding director of the Committee to Protect Journalists. She has taught at Princeton University, Sarah Lawrence, CUNY, and the University of California, Berkeley.

Since 2006, Kramer has been a Chevalier de la Légion d'Honneur. In 2016, she was elected to the American Academy of Arts and Letters.

Her cousin is the photographer Stephen Shore.

== Bibliography ==
=== Books ===
- Kramer, Jane (1963). Off Washington Square : a reporter looks at Greenwich Village. New York: Duell, Sloan & Pierce.
- — (1969). Allen Ginsberg in America. Random House.
- — (1970). Honor to the bride like the pigeon that guards its grain under the clove tree. Farrar, Straus & Giroux. ISBN 9780374172572.
- — (1977). The last cowboy. Harper & Row.
- — (1980). Unsettling Europe. Random House.
- — (1988). Europeans. Farrar, Straus & Giroux. ISBN 9780374149390.
- — (1993). Eine Amerikanerin in Berlin. Edition Tiamat.
- — (1993). Sonderbare Europäer. Die Andere Bibliothek/Eichborn.
- — (1994). Whose art is it?. Duke UP.
- — (1996). Unter Deutschen. Edition Tiamat.
- — (1996). The politics of memory : looking for Germany in the New Germany. Random House.
- — (2002). Lone patriot : the short career of an American militiaman. Random House.
- — (2017). The reporter's kitchen : essays. St. Martin's Press.

=== Essays and reporting ===
- Kramer, Jane (January 21, 1985). "Letter from Europe". The New Yorker. 60 (49): 74–91. (Note: Discusses farming in the Périgord region, France, and attachment to the land.)
- — (November 24, 2008). "The hungry travellers". Profiles. The New Yorker. 84 (38): 100–106. (Note: Profiles cooks and food writers Jeffrey Alford and Naomi Duguid.)
- — (December 3, 2012). "The philosopher chef : Yotam Ottolenghi's ideas are changing the way London eats". The New Yorker. 88 (38): 86–97.
- — (March 18, 2013). "A fork of one's own : a history of culinary revolution". The Critics. Books. The New Yorker. 89 (5): 74–80.
- — (November 4, 2013). "Post-Modena : Italy's food is bound by tradition. Its most famous chef isn't". Profiles. The New Yorker. 89 (35): 82–85, 87–90, 92–93.
- — (April 14, 2014). "Good greens : vegetarian cookbooks for carnivores". The Critics. Books. The New Yorker. 90 (8): 79–83.
- — (June 29, 2015). "The demolition man : Matteo Renzi is on a mission to remake Italy". Letter from Europe. The New Yorker. 91 (18): 36–42, 44–47. (Note: Title in the online table of contents is "Can this man save Italy?".)

———————
