= Anna & Kristina's Beauty Call =

- Title card of programme.
- Genre: Infotainment, Fashion, Beauty
- Created by: Anna Wallner; Kristina Matisic
- Developed by: Anna Wallner; Kristina Matisic
- Directed by: Jennifer Little; Barb Margetts; Lionel Goddard; Dale Drewery; Nicholas Treeshin
- Starring: Anna Wallner; Kristina Matisic
- Theme music composer: Graeme Coleman
- Country of origin: Canada
- Original language: English
- No. of seasons: 1
- No. of episodes: 26 (list of episodes)

Production
- Executive producers: Anna Wallner; Kristina Matisic
- Producers: Joyce Sawa; Heather Hawthorn-Doyle
- Production locations: Vancouver, British Columbia, Canada
- Cinematography: Carl Alcock
- Editor: Jessica McKee
- Camera setup: Single-camera
- Running time: 30 minutes (including commercials)
- Production companies: Worldwide Bag Media, Inc.

Original release
- Network: W Network
- Release: November 10, 2009 – June 15, 2010

Related
- The Shopping Bags

Anna & Kristina's Beauty Call is a Canadian television series that airs on the W Network in Canada. Parts of the program are filmed in Vancouver, British Columbia, while some segments for the show are filmed in Los Angeles, New York, and Toronto. The show is produced by Worldwide Bag Media Inc. in association with W Network and produced by Picture Box Distribution. The credits give the impression that hosts Anna Wallner and Kristina Matisic are tip-toeing around a store, naked.

Hosts Anna Wallner and Kristina Matisic previously hosted and produced the two series The Shopping Bags and Anna & Kristina's Grocery Bag.

Targeting the 25-to-54 demographic, the show is slated for 26 episodes in its first season. Media planning was done by Toronto's Zig and executed through New York's Active Media. The show's premiere offers tips on eyebrow grooming, how to best fit a stiletto, and wearing the right accessories for your body type.

== Concept ==
By employing various product-testing methods, Anna and Kristina put clothing, trends and beauty products and techniques to the test. This is also accomplished with the help of high-profile fashion and beauty industry guest experts including Carolina Herrera and Yigal Azrouel. The first episode aired on Tuesday, November 10, 2009, at 9 p.m.

The goal of each episode is to re-style men and women facing fashion dilemmas, working with a $500 budget. In addition to the limited budget, the two have just a few hours to put the look together. The $500 budget was partly influenced by today's challenging economic times and the fact that few people have limitless funds for clothes. The final outfit, and how it suits the person they have made over, is then offered up for appraisal by an expert from the fashion world. The judges include Kim Newport-Mimran of Pink Tartan, Flare editor-in-chief Lisa Tant, and Brian Hill, president and CEO of Aritzia.

The show also includes product reviews, how-to's, and tips for both budget- and style-conscious consumers.

== Segments ==
During each 30-minute episode, there are a variety of rotating segments in addition to the main makeover segment. Said segments include:

- Anatomy of, which takes a look at the key details that go into making a quality piece of clothing
- Beauty and the Best, where Anna and Kristina work with other testers to test the quality of beauty products
- Copy Cats, a look at expensive items and examples of good imitations that are cost efficient
- Uncut, where Anna & Kristina look at various non-invasive beauty treatments, including intense pulsed light therapy, lipolaser therapy, and infrared saunas.

== List of episodes ==
No.	Title	Directed by	Original release date
1	"Tracey: Relaxed Professional"	Edi Osghian	October 11, 2009
A film industry lawyer needs a creative, comfortable yet polished look. Lisa Tant, Editor-in-Chief of Flare Magazine, is the guest fashionista-judge.
2	"Nicole: Urban Nightlife"	Jennifer Little	October 18, 2009
A small-town school teacher wants a sexy, out-on-the-town look. Comrags designer-owners Joyce Gunhouse and Judy Cornish are the guest fashionista-judges.
3	"Stella: Black Tie Wedding"	Jennifer Little	October 25, 2009
A personal trainer who is used to sweats and yoga clothes needs a formal gown for a black-tie wedding. The guest fashionista-judge is Kimberly Newport-Mimram, head of Pink Tartan.
4	"Sandra: Evening Professional"	Jennifer Little	January 12, 2010
A commercial real estate professional, six-foot tall Sandra needs a polished evening outfit to wear to a benefit she helped organize. Stylings are judged by haute couture designer Malene Grotrian.
5	"Paul: Funky Date Night"	Jennifer Little	January 19, 2010
Web developer Paul wants an update to his laid-back wardrobe to look stylish and sophisticated for his wife on date night. Kitson head Dean Khial is the guest fashionista-judge.
6	"Melissa: Sexy Pregnancy"	Jennifer Little, Dale Drewery	January 26, 2010
Mom-to-be Melissa has been relying on yoga wear throughout most of her pregnancy, but wants to be brought back to the land of the stylish. Marta Abrams of Moody Mamas is the guest fashionista-judge.
7	"Kara: Cheap Chic"	Jennifer Little	February 2, 2010
Kara has expensive taste in fashion, but a bookkeeper's budget. The mission is to style her in a high-fashion look with just $500. Former model Janice Dickinson is the guest judge.
8	"Jennifer: Beach Babe"	Jennifer Little, Dale Drewery	February 9, 2010
Pear-shaped Jennifer is looking for beach wardrobe to take on her upcoming trip to Thailand, which includes a bikini. Designer, Ashley Paige, is the guest fashionista judge.
9	"Jesse: College Campus Hip"	Jennifer Little, Dale Drewery	February 16, 2010
PhD student Jesse is stuck in a major rut. Since he doesn't have to dress for anyone, he wears sloppy jeans and t-shirts. And because he is so slim, he finds it hard to spend money on clothes that don't fit. Head of Fidelity Denim, Jason Trotzuk is the guest fashionista-judge.
10	"Kathryn: Sophisticated Evening"	Lionel Goddard	February 23, 2010
Curvaceous Kathryn wants a fashion-forward look for an upcoming family reunion in Montreal with some worldly relatives she hasn't seen in over 15 years. TV star turned designer, Whitney Port, is the celebrity fashion judge on this episode.
11	"Nikki & Connie: Separate Identities, Funky Vs. Adventurous"	Jennifer Little, Lionel Goddard	March 2, 2010
Identical twins Nicky and Connie still get mixed up by friends and family. They want some style help in an effort to express their own individuality. The guest fashion expert on this episode is fashion designer Paul Hardy.
12	"Shannon: Day Into Night"	Jennifer Little, Lionel Goddard	March 9, 2010
Software CEO Shannon needs to remove the bored from her boardroom black attire and have a fun, flirty look that can take her from day time into night. Treana Peake, head of Obakki Design House, is the guest fashionista-judge.
13	"Cheryl K.: Flirty Date Night"	Jennifer Little, Lionel Goddard	March 16, 2010
Security guard Cheryl wears a plain uniform by day. She needs help to find a sexy going-out look for a big date coming up. RozeMerie Cuevas, head of the Jacqueline Conoir Collection, is the guest fashionista.
14	"Jenn: Age Appropriate"	Jennifer Little, Lionel Goddard	March 23, 2010
A self-confessed cougar, 43-year-old Jenn wants to dress more age-appropriate, rather than the 10 years older her frumpy wardrobe makes her look. But she says she's a dress-hater. Movie costume designer, Tish Monaghan, is the guest fashionista.
15	"Katrina: Romantic Date Night"	Jennifer Little, Dale Drewery	March 30, 2010
Busy mom of 3 youngsters under two-years-old, Katrina was stuck in a rut of mom sweat suits in various shades of black. She needs help finding a great look for a romantic date night with her husband. Designer and Project Runway Canada mentor Brian Bailey is the fashion judge.
16	"Cheryl H.: 40 Year Old Bride"	Jennifer Little, Dale Drewery	April 6, 2010
Blushing bride Cheryl needed some help choosing an elegant, age-appropriate dress for her upcoming wedding. The show tripled their budget and timeline and took on the challenge. Alison McGill, Editor-in-Chief of Weddingbells Magazine is the fashion judge.
17	"Taryn: Après Ski Style"	Jennifer Little, Barb Margetts	April 13, 2010
Off the slopes, Taryn needs some style help. Anna & Kristina takes on her challenge and try to impress Fashion Magazine market editor Sarah Casselman.
18	"Emily: Polished Professional"	Jennifer Little, Nicholas Treeshin	April 20, 2009
University fundraiser committee member Emily looks more like a student than a professional. Her style is taken up a notch to prepare her for an upcoming conference. Stylings are judged by model-turned-designer, Monika Schnarre.
19	"Lorraine: Hip at 50"	Jennifer Little, Barb Margetts	April 27, 2010
Newly-single Lorraine has a big birthday coming up and she wants to celebrate in style. She's turning 50 in New York and asked us to give her formerly-frumpy look an overhaul for her trip to the Big Apple. Designer David Dixon judges our efforts.
20	"Tanya & Andrea: Glamorous Rehearsal Dinner"	Jennifer Little, Barb Margetts	May 4, 2010
Soon-to-be married Tanya and Andrea wanted to "wow" their family and friends looking chic and put-together at their pre-wedding rehearsal dinner. Anna & Kristina take on the challenge of dressing this sassy (almost) husband and wife. Fashion diva Jeanne Beker judges their efforts.
21	"Brenda: Sophisticated Mom"	Jennifer Little, Nicholas Treeshin	May 11, 2010
Mother of teenage twin daughters, Brenda's look was stuck in a seventies zoo. She asked the show to help her tame the leopard side of her personality and give her a more sophisticated look for her daughters' upcoming graduation. The judge for Brenda's new look is celebrity stylist Nikki Pennie.
22	"Lindsay: Green and Stylish"	Barb Margetts	May 18, 2010
Queen of Green, Lindsay, works at a non-profit eco-organization. She wants to dress more planet-friendly, and needs help to find her an outfit for an upcoming event. Eco-fashion designer Lizzie Parker judges the efforts.
23	"Carol: Country Chic"	Barb Margetts	May 25, 2010
55-year-old farm girl Carol wears an outdated wardrobe of baggy denim and unflattering outfits. She wants help putting together a sexy country chic look to surprise her husband for an upcoming concert event. "Peter Perfect" Peter Ishkhans is the style judge.
24	"James: Old School Vegas"	Barb Margetts	June 1, 2010
James the fireman is headed to Las Vegas for a boys' weekend. He looks for help getting in touch with the classic Rat Pack style of Dean Martin and Michael Buble. Star stylist Lawrence Zarian judges Anna & Kristina's work.
25	"Eileen: Everyday Sexy"	Barb Margetts, Nicolas Treeshin	June 8, 2010
Anna & Kristina takes frumpy mom Eileen out of her jeans and sweatshirts and into an everyday sexy look, with Project Runway's Nick Verreos as the fashionista judge.
26	"Debbie: Stylish Traveler"	Barb Margetts, Nicolas Treeshin	June 15, 2010
Adrenaline junkie Debbie is headed on a fantastic trip and asked Anna & Kristina to put together a no-fuss outfit she can wear on her travels. Fashion & celebrity commentator Perez Hilton judges the efforts.

== See also ==
- The Shopping Bags
- Anna & Kristina's Grocery Bag
