= Peter Perfect =

Peter Perfect may refer to:

- Peter Perfect in the Turbo Terrific, a character in the cartoon Wacky Races
- Peter Brock, Australian motor racer
- Peter Gregg (racing driver), U.S. motor racer
- Peter Ishkhans, judge on the makeover reality series Tease
