= Food Network (Asian TV channel) =

Asian pay television channel

Food Network Asia
- Country: India, Singapore
- Headquarters: Singapore

Programming
- Picture format: 1080i HDTV

Ownership
- Owner: Skydance Asia-Pacific, Middle East and North Africa (Skydance Corporation)

History
- Launched: 5 July 2010; 16 years ago
- Closed: 1 June 2025; 17 months ago (Malaysia)

Links
- Website: www.foodnetworkasia.com

Food Network is a pay television channel that airs both one-time and recurring (episodic) programs about food and cooking from the Food Network's library as well as commissioned programming developed regionally. It was launched on 5 July 2010 in Singapore.

The channel itself is not available in South Korea. But under a special agreement, Food TV (a nationwide pay TV channel) is carrying programmes from Food Network by simulcasting the pan-Asian version and airing the shows recorded from the channel in particular time slots.

== Programming ==
- See List of programs schedule broadcast by Food Network Asia

== High-definition feed ==
Food Network Asia HD is a 1080i high definition simulcast of Food Network Asia. It originally aired a different lineup than the SD version, with only HD programs. Food Network Asia was launched in Singapore on July 5, 2010, on StarHub TV channel 468 in HD.

Food Network Asia also launched in Malaysia from October 1, 2010, on Astro channel 706 in HD, initially timesharing with another channel, Life Inspired as well as the Philippines on Cignal Digital TV, on October 8, 2010.

On 1 June 2025, Food Network Malaysia ceased transmission on Astro.

== See also ==
- List of shows on the Food Network
