= Tony Gemignani =

American chef and restaurateur

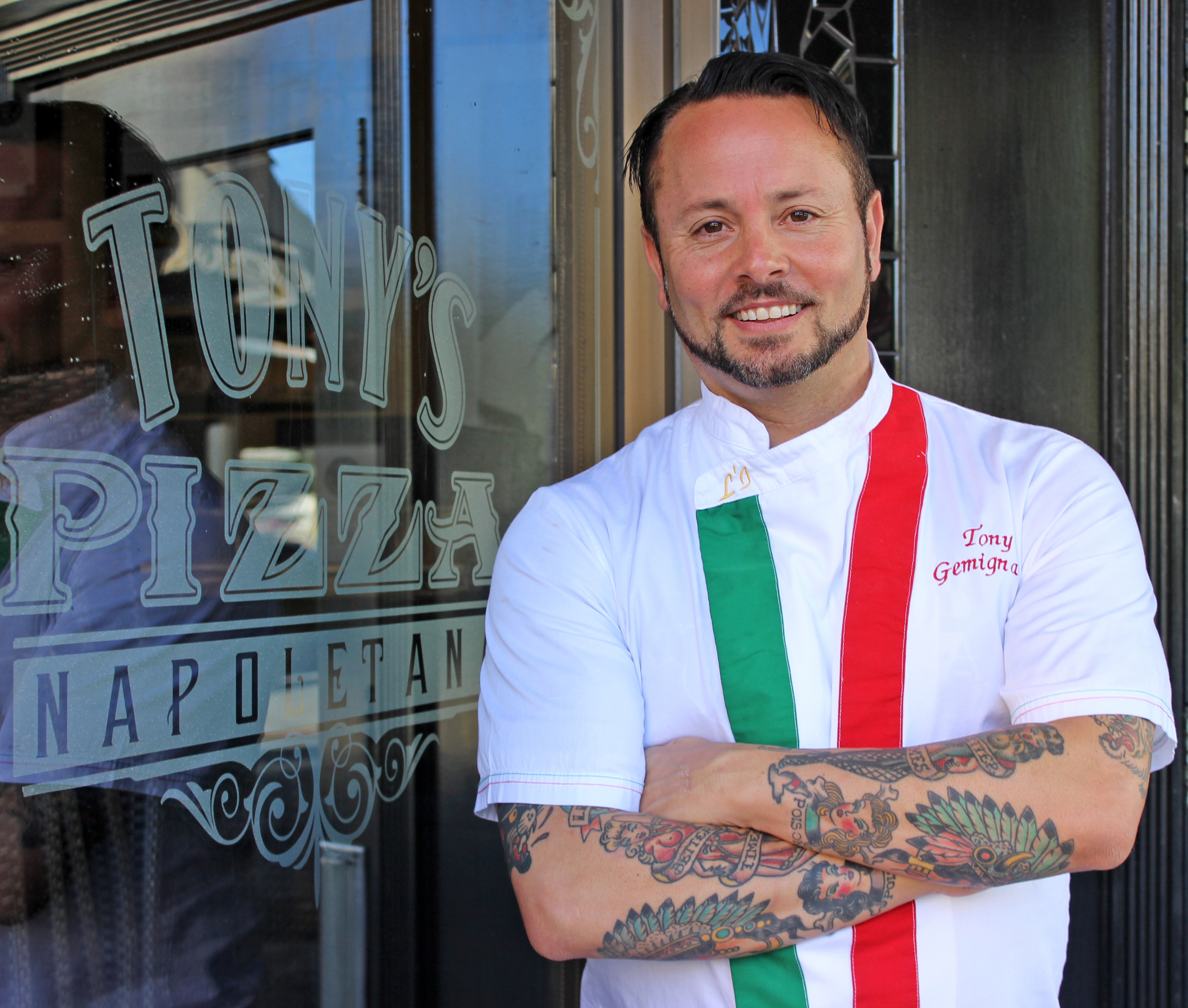
- Tony Gemignani at his restaurant, Tony's Pizza Napoletana in San Francisco.
- Born: Anthony Felix Gemignani; Fremont, California
- Spouse: Julie White Gemignani (m. 2000)
- Culinary career
- Cooking style: Italian
- Current restaurants
- Tony's Pizza Napoletana, San Francisco (2009-present); Tony's Coal-Fired Pizza and Slice House, San Francisco (2010-present); Slice House by Tony Gemignani, nationwide (2022-present); Pizza Rock, Sacramento, California (2011-2021); Las Vegas (2013-present); Henderson, Nevada (2015-present); Tony's of North Beach, Rohnert Park, California (2013-present); Capo's, San Francisco (2012-present); Little Tony's, Las Vegas (2015-present); Giovanni Italian Specialties, San Francisco (2017-present); Toscano Brothers Italian Bakery, San Francisco (2021-present); Dago Bagel, San Francisco (2021-present)
- Awardss
- *First Place Pizza All Stars by Antonio Mezzero Porto, Portugal 2018 Cooking Pizza Neo Napoletana paired with Croft Port; *First Place Best Pizza (Pizza in Pala) World Pizza Championships Parma, Italy 2016; *8 Time World Champion Pizza Acrobat; 1995, 1996, 1997, 2000, 2001, 2005, 2006, 2007; *1st Place World Champion Pizza Maker, 2007 – World Pizza Cup Naples, Italy; *1st Place Roman Pizza World Championships of Pizza Makers 2011 Naples, Italy; *1st Place Best of the Best World Champion/Master Pizza Maker 2012; Pizza Expo Las Vegas, Nevada; *Gold Medal "Squadra Acrobatica " Pizza Olympics – Salsomaggiore, Italy 2007; *Gold Medal "Squadra Acrobatica " Salsomaggiore, Italy 2006; *Gold Medal "Team Acrobatic" Las Vegas 2005; *Gold Medal/1st place Food Network "Pizza Battle" 2005; *1st place Icon Estates Pizza Battaglia 2005; *1st Triple Crown Winner in Pizza History; *Gold Cup Pizza Classica – International Pizza Makers Challenge, Lecce, Italy 2008; *Gold Cup Pizza Teglia -International Pizza Makers Challenge, Lecce, Italy 2008; *Gold Cup Acrobat – International Pizza Makers Challenge, Lecce, Italy 2008; *Best Pizza USA – World Pizza Championships, Salsomaggiore, Italy 2008; *Silver Medal "Team Acrobatic" Salsomaggiore, Italy 2005; *Bronze Medal "Pizza Acrobatic" Salsomaggiore, Italy 2005; *Gold Medal / 1st Place Pizza Champions Challenge Food Network 2006; *Gold Medal / First Place – Master of Champions (ABC TV); *Gold Medal/1st place World Pizza Cup Naples, Italy Best Pizza STG/Neapolitan category
- Website: www.tonygemignani.com

Anthony Felix Gemignani is an American chef, restaurateur, and author. In 2009, Gemignani opened Tony's Pizza Napoletana in the North Beach neighborhood of San Francisco, California. Gemignani is a pizzaiolo and chef, having won 13 world titles in pizza making and opening numerous restaurants. He has appeared on multiple reality television series including Food Network Challenge, Bar Rescue on Spike TV, as well as on The Travel Channel and CNN.

== Early life and career ==
Gemignani was born in Fremont, California, to Frank and Eileen Gemignani. He grew up on his family's farm. He is a third generation Italian American.

Gemignani graduated from Washington High School in Fremont, and later worked at Pyzano's, his brother Frank Jr.'s restaurant in Castro Valley, California, in 1991. Gemignani began his pizza tosser career while at Pyzano's as a way to entertain customers and to show the quality of the dough to diners. He competed all over the world, winning 8 world champion titles for pizza acrobatics between 1995–2007, and earning himself the nickname of the "Michael Jordan of Pizza Throwing". Gemignani traveled the world for 16 years, competing, working in others' kitchens, and learning about regional styles of pizza.

Gemignani formed the World Pizza Champions in 2005, which is made up of over 60 team members who have each earned the highest awards in the pizza industry, along with television appearances, Guinness World Records, and respect as leading professionals and pioneers in the pizza industry.

In 2007, Gemignani took the title of "World Champion Pizza Maker" at the World Pizza Cup in Naples, Italy. Gemignani was the first American and non-Neapolitan to ever take this title. Gemignani is the first and only Triple Crown winner for baking at the International Pizza Championships in Lecce, Italy, meaning, he won three first place titles in one competition.

== Restaurants ==
=== Tony's Pizza Napoletana ===
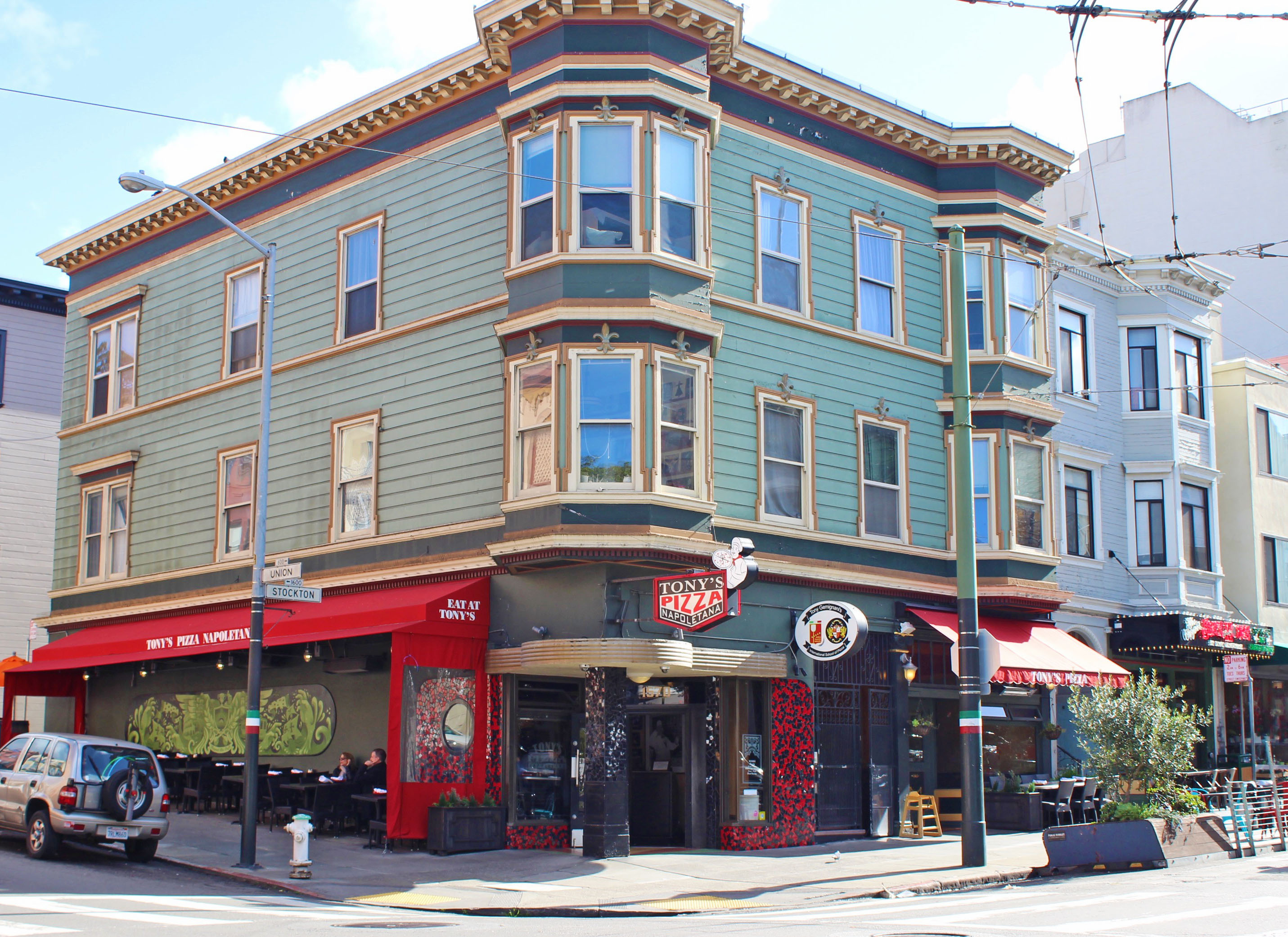
Tony's Pizza Napoletana in San Francisco, CA.

Gemignani opened his first restaurant, Tony's Pizza Napoletana, in July 2009, with partners Bruno DiFabio and Nancy Puglisi, in San Francisco's North Beach. The restaurant has 7 pizza ovens.

Tony's Pizza Napoletana is recognized as one of the city's best pizzerias. Along with being named "The Best Pizzeria in America" by Forbes magazine, the restaurant has received multiple accolades in a number of publications, both local and national, including Zagat, USA Today, The San Francisco Chronicle, The Huffington Post, Food and Wine, Travel + Leisure, Fox News, and others.

In July 2025, Tony's Pizza Napoletana opened at San Francisco International Airport in the SF Eats Food Hall located in Harvey Milk Terminal 1, offering travelers a taste of one of San Francisco's most iconic pizzerias.

=== The Original Slice House & Coal-Fired Pizza by Tony Gemignani ===
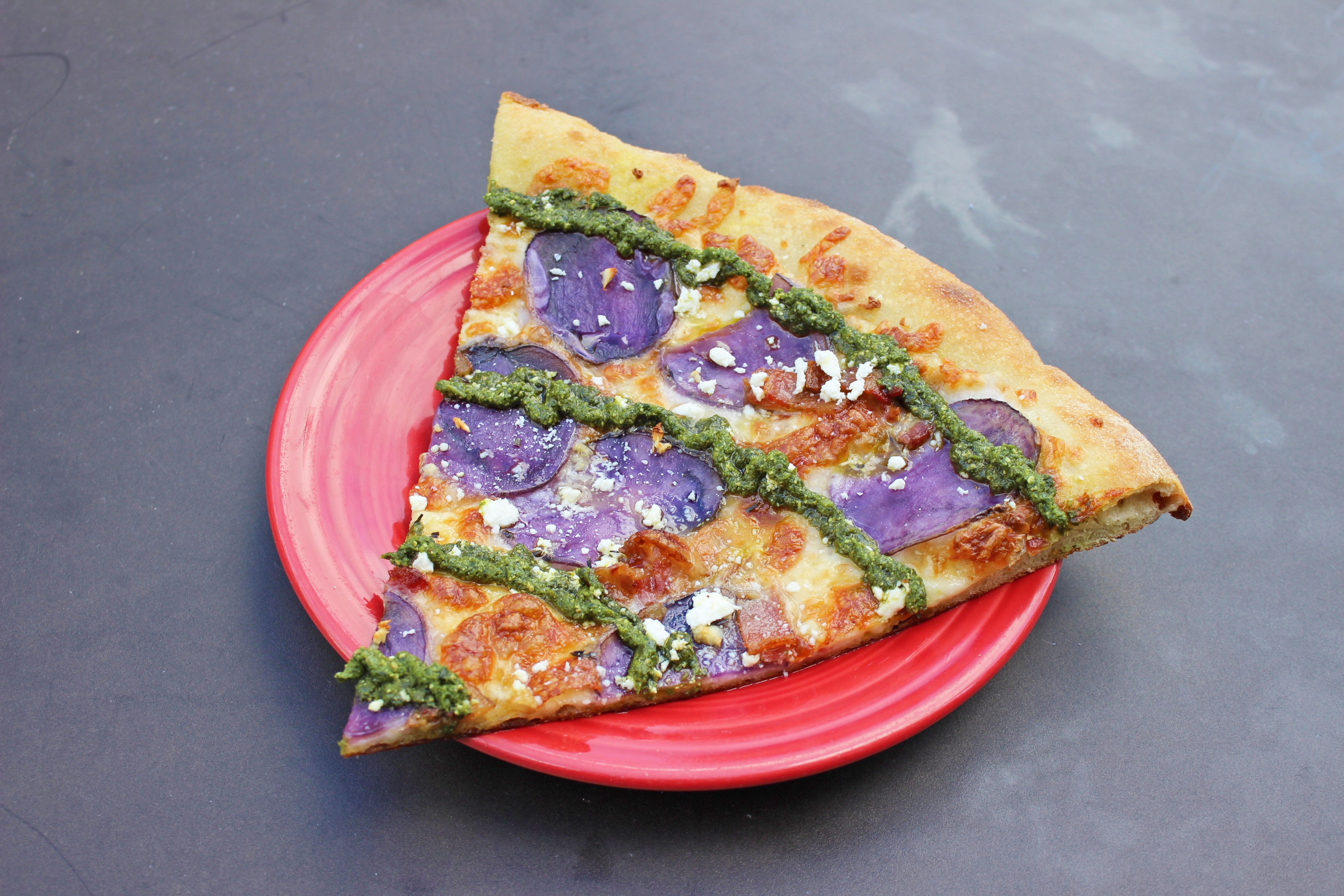
New York Style Slice, the Purple Potato Pesto at Tony's Coal-Fired Pizza and Slice-house in San Francisco.

Opening in 2010, Gemignani took ownership of an adjacent deli. Seeing this as an opportunity to serve more styles of pizzas like classic New York style slices, Sicilian, and California style slices, along with Chicago Beef Sandwiches and other deli favorites, the slicehouse allowed people to enjoy Gemignani's pizza without the infamous wait times usually seen at his flagship restaurant.

Since the opening in North Beach, Gemignani has expanded his slice house concept to include concessions stalls in Oracle Park (San Francisco, CA), Chase Center (San Francisco, CA), Levi's Stadium (Santa Clara, CA) Allegiant Stadium (Las Vegas, NV), and The Sphere (Las Vegas, NV) before franchising it in 2022.

=== Slice House by Tony Gemignani ===
Slice House, Gemignani’s celebrated fast-casual franchise, launched in 2022 to deliver an artisan pizza experience rooted in the origins of his North Beach, San Francisco pizzeria, all within an artistic and energetic atmosphere. Recognized as one of the top pizza chains nationwide, Slice House offers an extensive menu that features four styles of handmade crust, including New York, Grandma, Sicilian, and Detroit-style pizzas, available by the slice or whole pizza. The complete menu includes salads, wings, and desserts, along with craft beers and premium wines. As 2024’s #1 Overall Brand by Pizza Marketplace’s Top 100 Movers & Shakers and recognized on Fast Casual's 25 Brands to Watch in 2026, Slice House carries forward Gemignani’s craft through authentic recipes and a flexible, proven business model tailored for diverse dining and delivery platforms. It currently has locations in California, Arizona, Tennessee, Texas, Utah, Idaho, Colorado, and Nevada.

=== Pizza Rock ===
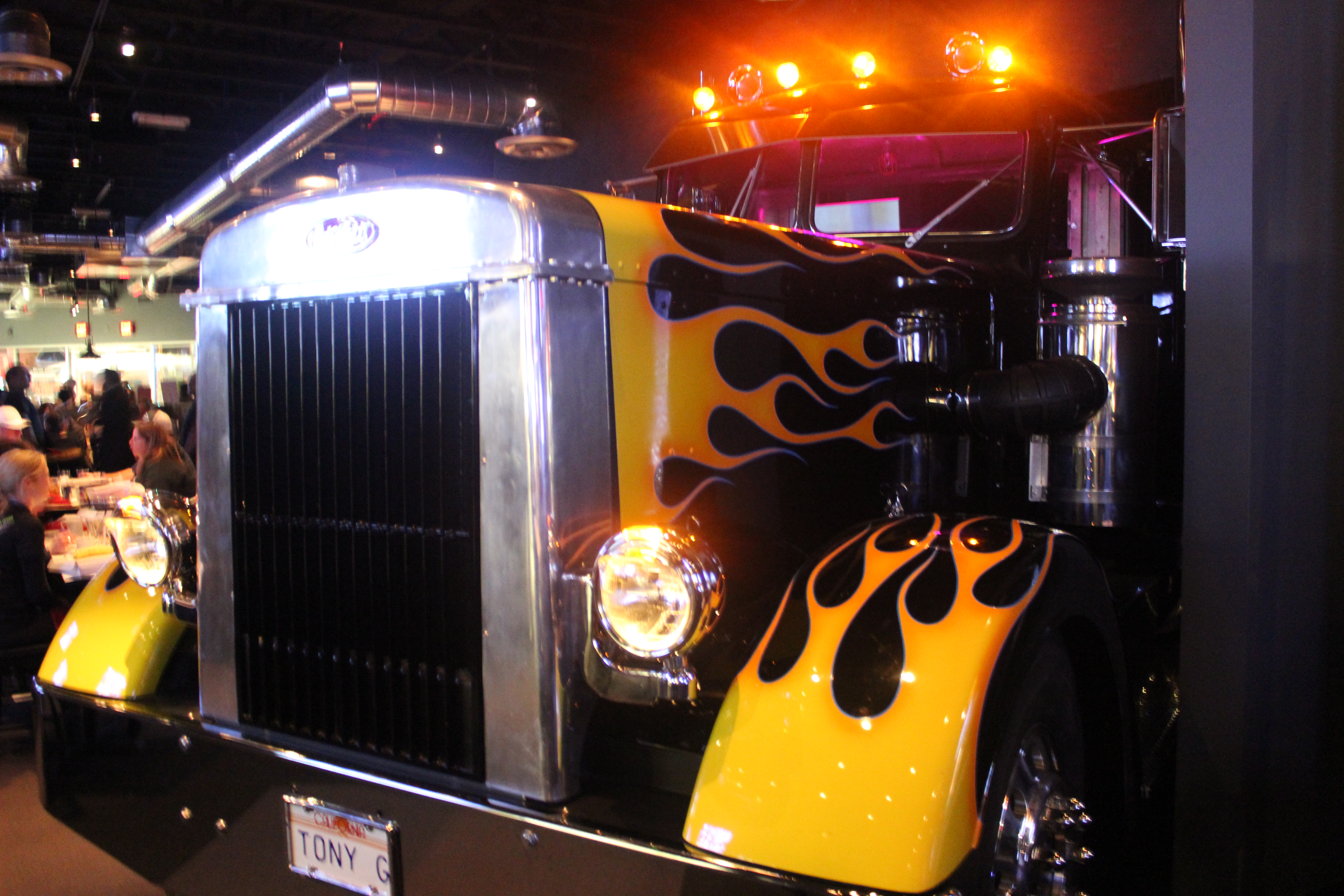
Pizza Rock's iconic Semi-Truck, outfitted with a DJ Booth.

In 2011, Gemignani, Hewitt and Karpaty opened Pizza Rock in Sacramento California, with a focus on rock 'n' roll and great pizza. Pizza Rock offered many of the same items as Tony's Pizza Napoletana but featured events such as Acoustic Brunch and live DJs performing from a custom Peterbilt truck. Pizza Rock permanently closed in Sacramento, California on July 29, 2020 as a result of declining sales due to the Covid-19 pandemic. Pizza Rock is still open in Las Vegas and Henderson, Nevada. Pizza Rock has received accolades in a number of publications, including the Sacramento and The Chew.

=== Capo's ===
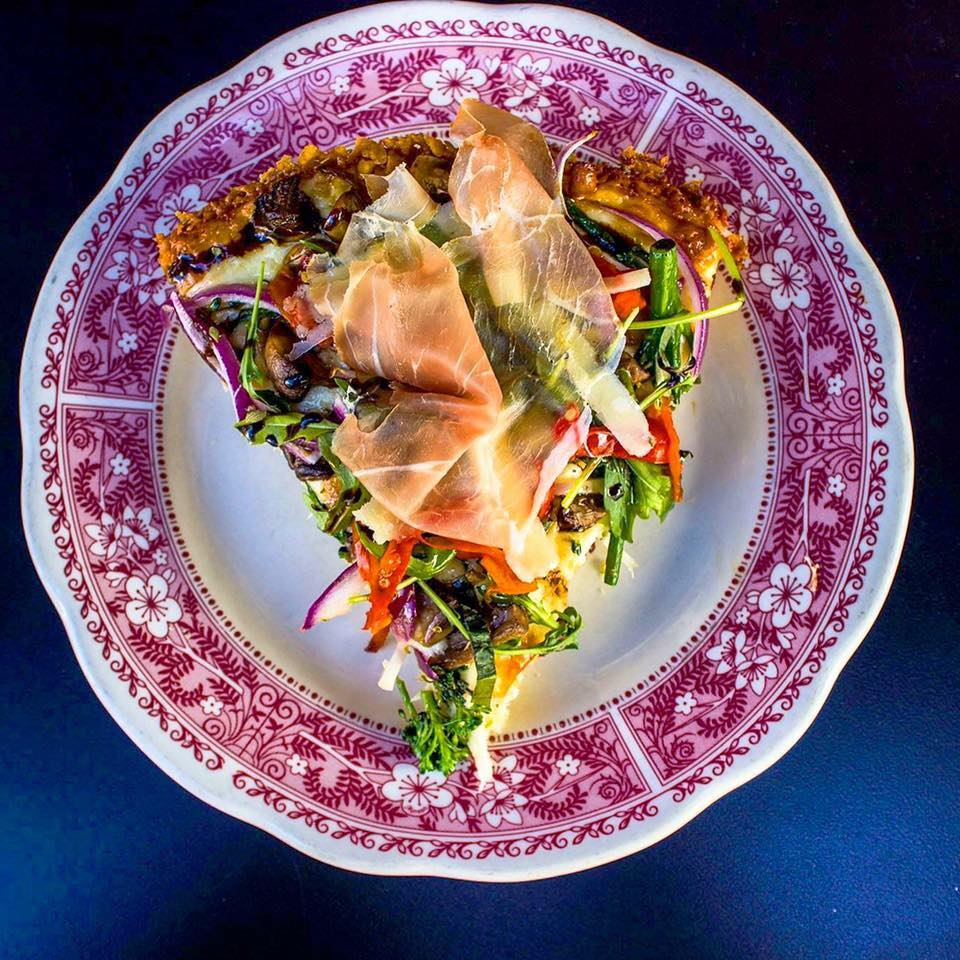
Capo's 2016 award winning pizza, The Crown Point.

Gemignani's Chicago-style pizza and whiskey bar, Capo's, opened in November 2012 just two blocks away from Tony's Pizza Napoletana; it was designed to feel like a prohibition era speakeasy. The restaurant invites family style dining, serving four styles of Chicago-style pizza: Deep Dish, Stuffed, Cast Iron Pan, and Tavern Style; along with Southern Italian dishes. Favorite items include the Quattro Forni, a thick, square cut pizza cooked in four ovens that is a variation on a pizza baked in three ovens that won Gemignani an international championship; The Dillinger and The Crown Point, Cast Iron Pan pizzas, that won the World's Best Pan Pizza and the Best of the Best at the International Pizza Challenge in Las Vegas in 2014 and 2016, and subsequently earned Chef Matt Molina the title of Pizza Maker of the Year in 2014 and Best of the Best Champion in 2016.

=== Tony's of North Beach ===
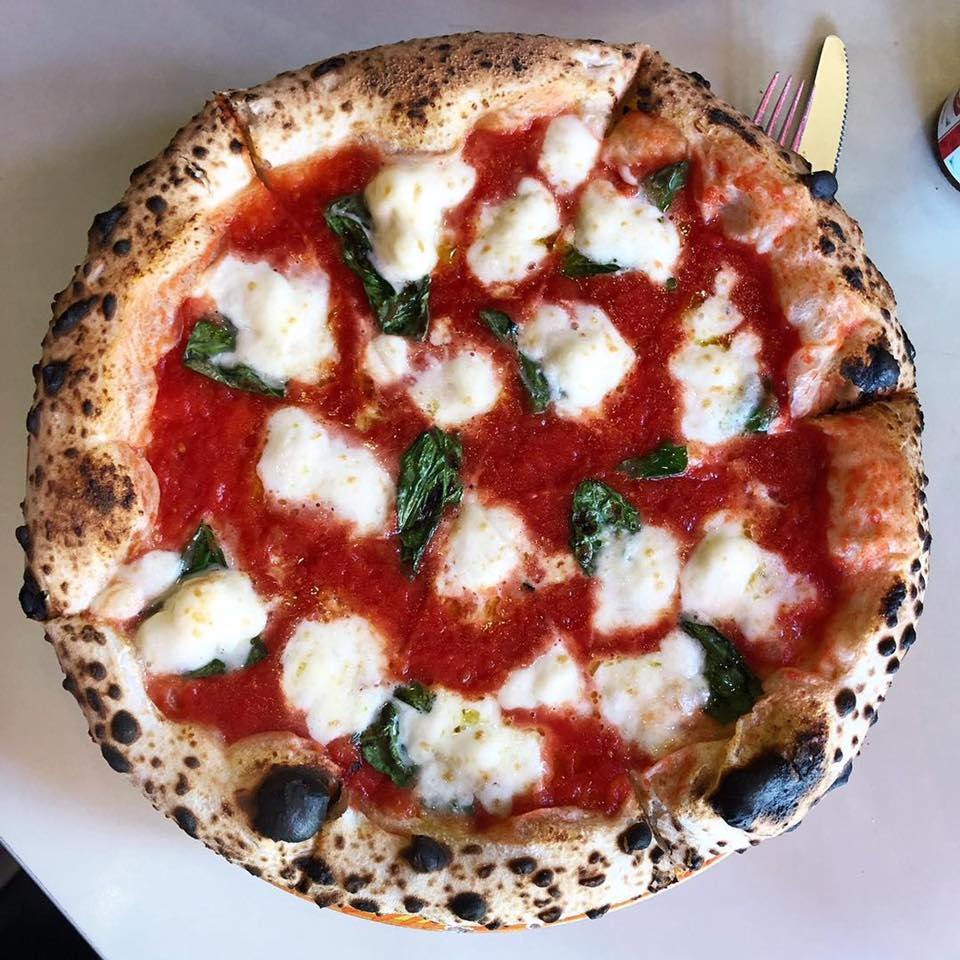
Gemignani's Award Winning Margherita Pizza at Tony's of North Beach in Rohnert Park, California.

Opened in 2013 at the Graton Resort & Casino in Rohnert Park, California, Tony's of North Beach offers many styles of pizzas made by Tony Gemignani. The menu offers eight kinds of pizzas made in three different kinds of ovens, family-style pasta dinners, sandwiches, and salads.

== International School of Pizza ==
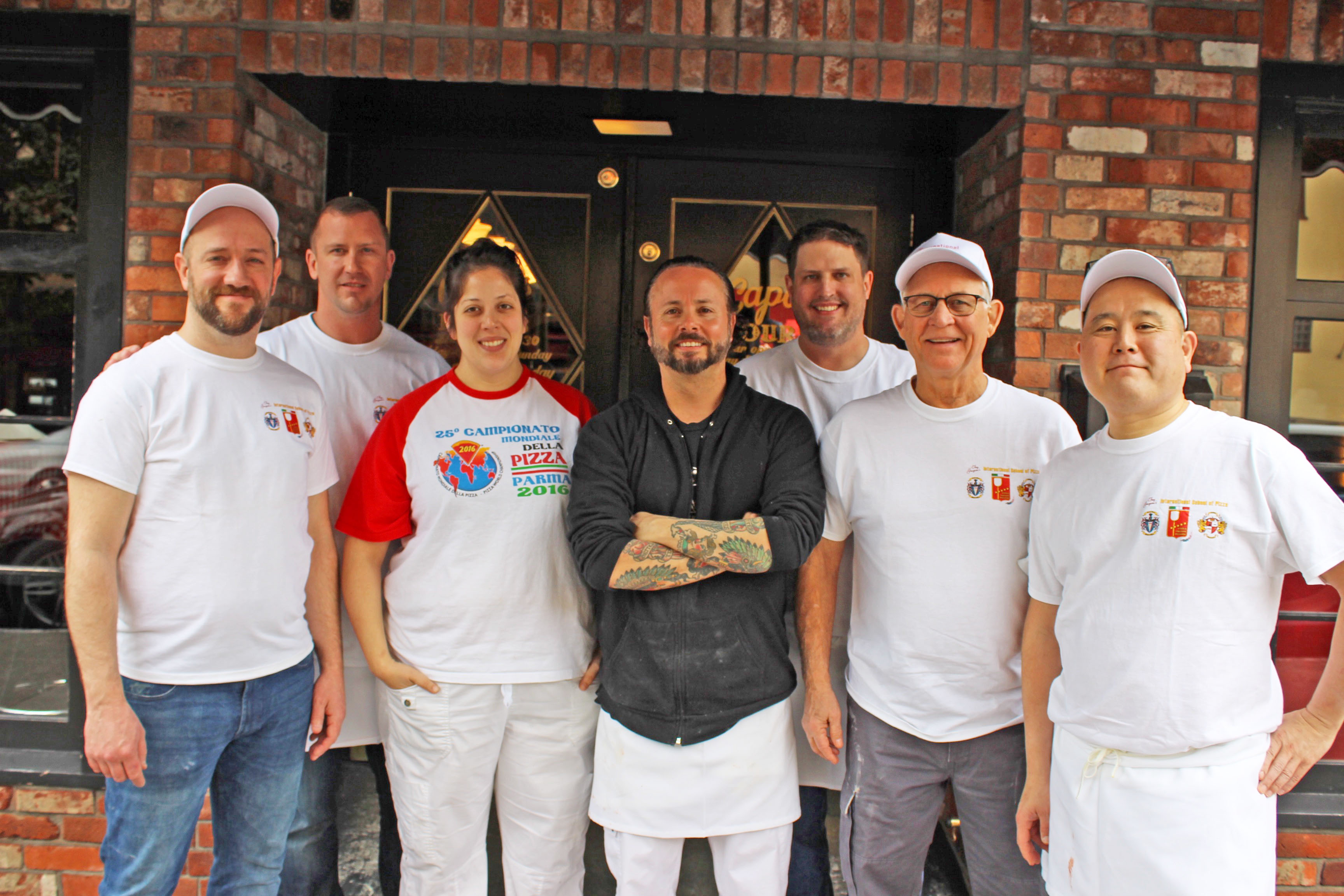
Tony and instructor Laura Meyer with a class of graduating students of the International School of Pizza.

Gemignani is the first certified Master Instructor in the United States. He opened the International School of Pizza and the United States School of Pizza under the Scuola Italiana Pizzaioli. Gemignani and his fellow instructors certify students from around the world, and the certifications come direct from Italy with strict guidelines and theory followed from the Scuola Italiana Pizzaioli. Gemignani also offers non-professional home chef courses, designed to teach home cooks how to make restaurant quality pizza in their own kitchens. In 2023, Gemignani closed the International School of Pizza to focus on his numerous other pizza ventures.

== Retail ==
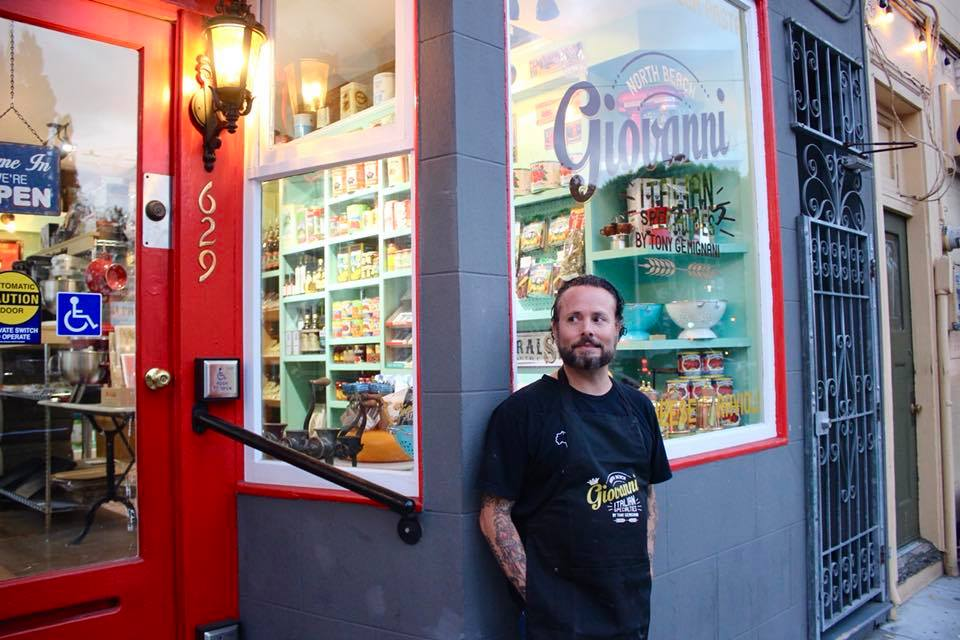
Tony outside of Giovanni Italian Specialties in North Beach, San Francisco.

Giovanni Italian Specialties opened in October 2017, when Tony brought an "old-world Italian specialties shop" to the neighborhood of North Beach. Giovanni Italian Specialties offers fresh pasta, specialty cooking tools, cook books, and offers focaccia and piattinas daily.

A tribute to the local Italian bakeries of the past, Toscano Brothers is Tony's Italian bakery in North Beach, offering handcrafted baked goods using house-made, stone-milled flour including fresh pizza dough, piattinas, sandwiches, Italian pastries and fresh coffee, as well as an assortment of Dago Bagels and accoutrements. The Dago Bagels are made in-house – hand-rolled, boiled and baked to perfection – and offered in an array of flavors with accompanying schmears or sandwich options.

Tony Gemignani’s California Artisan Type 00 Pizza Blend flour is made by Central Milling.

== Filmography ==
Television appearances
Year	Episode title	Show	Channel	Season	Notes
2013	A Bar Full of Bull	Bar Rescue	Spike TV	season 3, episode 17	
2013	Jon of the Dead	Bar Rescue	Spike TV	season 3, episode 21	
2014	World Pizza Champ Turns Dough Into…Dough	Taking Stock with Pimm Fox	BloombergTV		
	On Location: Pizza Rock Vegas		The Chew		
	Pizza Paradise 2	Food Paradise	Travel Channel	season 0, episode 41	
	Pizza Champions	Challenge	Food Network		Michael Shepherd, Joe Carlucci, Siler Chapman and Tony Gemignani compete at Mall of America.
		The Pizza Show	Viceland		
	Cirque du Pizza: The Art of Pizza Acrobatics	Great Big Story	CNN		Micro-documentary.
	Sin City Eats	Cheap Eats	Cooking Channel	season 4, episode 10	
	Ryan's Yummy Playdate/Ryan's Speedy Playdate	Ryan's Mystery Playdate			

== Books ==
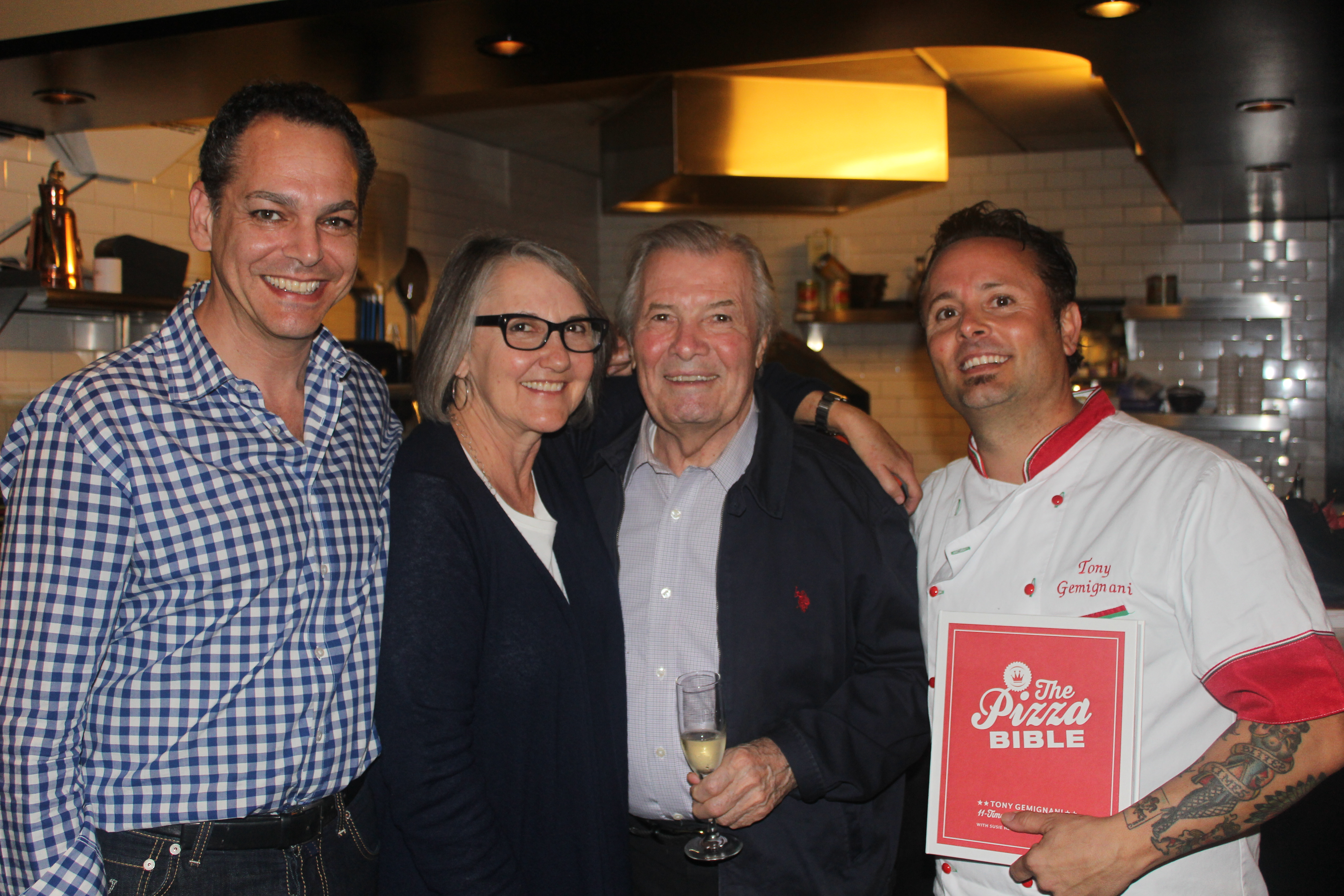
Tony Gemignani at his restaurant Tony's Pizza Napoletana for The Pizza Bible release party on October 21st, 2014 with Susie Heller, Steve Siegelman, and Jacques Pépin.

Gemignani has authored four books:

- Pizza: More than 60 Recipes for Delicious Homemade Pizza (Chronicle Books, July 28, 2005)
- Tony and the Pizza Champions (Chronicle Books, March 4, 2009)
- The Pizza Bible (Ten Speed Press, October 28, 2014)
- The Pursuit of Pizza: Recipes from the World Pizza Champions (Windermere Press, February 26, 2024)

== Awards ==
=== Titles ===
- First Place Pizza All Stars by Antonio Mezzero Porto, Portugal 2018 Cooking Pizza Neo Napoletana paired with Croft Port
- First Place Best Pizza (Pizza in Pala) World Pizza Championships Parma, Italy 2016
- 8 Time World Champion Pizza Acrobat (1995, 1996, 1997, 2000, 2001, 2005, 2006, 2007)
- World Champion Pizza Maker, 2007 World Pizza Cup, Naples, Italy
- Roman Pizza, 2011 World Championships of Pizza Makers, Naples, Italy
- Best of the Best World Champion/Master Pizza Maker, 2012 International Pizza Expo, Las Vegas, Nevada
- 2007 "Squadra Acrobatica" Pizza Olympics, Salsomaggiore, Italy
- 2006 "Squadra Acrobatica", Salsomaggiore, Italy
- 2005 "Team Acrobatic", Las Vegas, Nevada
- 2005 Food Network "Pizza Battle"
- 2005 Icon Estates Pizza Battaglia
- 1st Triple Crown Winner in Pizza History
- Gold Cup Pizza Classica, 2008 International Pizza Makers Challenge, Lecce, Italy
- Gold Cup Pizza Teglia, 2008 International Pizza Makers Challenge, Lecce, Italy
- Gold Cup Acrobat, 2008 International Pizza Makers Challenge, Lecce, Italy
- Best Pizza USA, 2008 World Pizza Championships, Salsomaggiore, Italy
- 2006 Pizza Champions Challenge, Food Network
- Master of Champions, ABC TV
- Inducted into the Legends of Pizza, 2006

=== Guinness Book of World Records ===
- Largest pizza base spun in two minutes (36.5 inches) 2006
- Most Consecutive Rolls Across the Shoulders in 30 seconds (37 times) 2006
- World's Longest Pizza (1,930.39 m) 2017
- Most people tossing pizza dough (263) 2014
