= The Shopping Bags =

- Created by: Anna Wallner; Kristina Matisic
- Starring: Anna Wallner; Kristina Matisic
- Country of origin: Canada
- No. of seasons: 7

Production
- Executive producers: Anna Wallner; Kristina Matisic
- Production locations: Vancouver, British Columbia, Canada
- Running time: 22 minutes
- Production companies: Force Four Entertainment; Worldwide Bag Media, Inc.

Original release
- Network: W Network (Canada); Fine Living (U.S.)
- Release: 2002 – 2008

Related
- Anna & Kristina's Grocery Bag

The Shopping Bags was a Canadian television series that aired on the W Network in Canada and on Fine Living in the United States. Launched in 2002, the series focused on consumer affairs and better shopping. Each week, the program looked at several goods and services to discover which one was the best. This was also done to guide viewers towards which product or service may best suit their needs. The program looked at day-to-day shopping and big ticket items, as well as having a final "Shopping Thought" at the end of each program.

The Shopping Bags was produced in Vancouver, British Columbia, Canada by Worldwide Bag Media Inc. The hosts and show creators are award-winning journalists Anna Wallner and Kristina Matisic. The show first aired on the W Network, a television channel in Canada aimed at women. The program was also broadcast on Fine Living in the United States, a channel aimed at both male and female viewers.

In 2005, a companion book to The Shopping Bags television show was written by Wallner and Matisic and published in 2006. The book is titled The Shopping Bags: Tips, Tricks, and Inside Information to Make You a Savvy Shopper.

The show received seven awards including the 2007 Leo Award for Best Hosts in an Information or Lifestyle Series and the 2006 Leo Award for Best Hosts in an Information or Lifestyle Series.

The show ended in 2008, and was replaced by Anna & Kristina's Grocery Bag.

== List of guest experts ==
(Names are from the episodes)

- Martha Stewart, American business magnate, author, editor, former stock broker, model, homemaking advocate, and convicted felon (insider trading).
- Diane von Furstenberg, fashion designer
- Randy Bachman
- Robin Coope, physicist
- Nina Hirvi, nutritionist
- Vincent Pastore, television actor and Sirius Satellite Radio broadcaster
- Candice Olson, interior designer
- Paula Begoun, beauty expert and author
- Jason Rivers, dermatologist
- Massimo Marcone, food scientist
- Rob Feenie, chef
- Robert Colin Newell, coffee expert-writer-blogger
- Dr. Derek Swain, child psychologist and school counselor

== See also ==
- Anna & Kristina's Grocery Bag
- Anna & Kristina's Beauty Call
