= Anthony Sedlak =

Canadian chef

Anthony Lawrence Sedlak (April 15, 1983 – July 4, 2012) was a Canadian chef and the host of Food Network Canada's The Main.

== Early life and education ==
Sedlak was born in Prince George, British Columbia and grew up in North Vancouver. At age 13, he began bussing at the Grouse Mountain cafeteria. He was soon promoted to the resort's main kitchen at 14, where he worked as production cook for what was then Bar 98. By 16 he was working at the Grouse Nest restaurant (now The Observatory). During this time he completed the Culinary Art Program at Carson Graham Secondary School in North Vancouver, followed by a four-year apprenticeship program at Vancouver Community College (VCC).

== Career ==
Following the advice of Sylvain Cuerrier, the executive chef for Grouse Mountain, 20-year-old Sedlak joined the team at La Trompette restaurant in west London where he worked under Chef Olivier Couillaud. With the experience and knowledge gained at La Trompette, Sedlak returned to Grouse Mountain Resorts where he was offered the position of sous-chef at The Observatory.

At 22, with the help of Chef Harold Bonkowski, head of the culinary arts department at VCC, Sedlak was selected as Canada's representative for the 2006 Hans Bueschken World Junior Chef Challenge in Auckland. He came away with a silver medal.

A few months later, Sedlak won Food Network's Superstar Chef Challenge II. After the win, he left The Observatory to shoot The Main, which premiered on 1 October 2007. Anthony was also a judge on the Food Network show Family Cook-Off.

He was named Executive Chef at The Corner Suite Bistro De Luxe in Vancouver, which was scheduled to open in November 2009.

In February 2010, just days before the opening of The Corner Suite Bistro, Anthony parted ways with the restaurant in pursuit of other opportunities.

== Death ==
Sedlak was found dead in his apartment in North Vancouver, British Columbia, Canada on July 6, 2012. According to the coroner's report, Sedlak died from suicide by taking excessive amounts of cocaine and oxycodone. Shortly before his death, Sedlak filmed an appearance as a guest judge on the television program Anna & Kristina's Grocery Bag. The episode in which Sedlak appeared aired on November 20, 2012. Even though it wasn't his last TV appearance, it featured a tribute to him at the end of the episode. Sedlak's final appearance was on season 2, episode 12 of You Gotta Eat Here! which aired on March 22, 2013, and at the end of the episode it said "in loving memory of Anthony Sedlak".
