= Tony's Pizza Napoletana =

Restaurant in San Francisco, California

Tony’s Pizza Napoletana
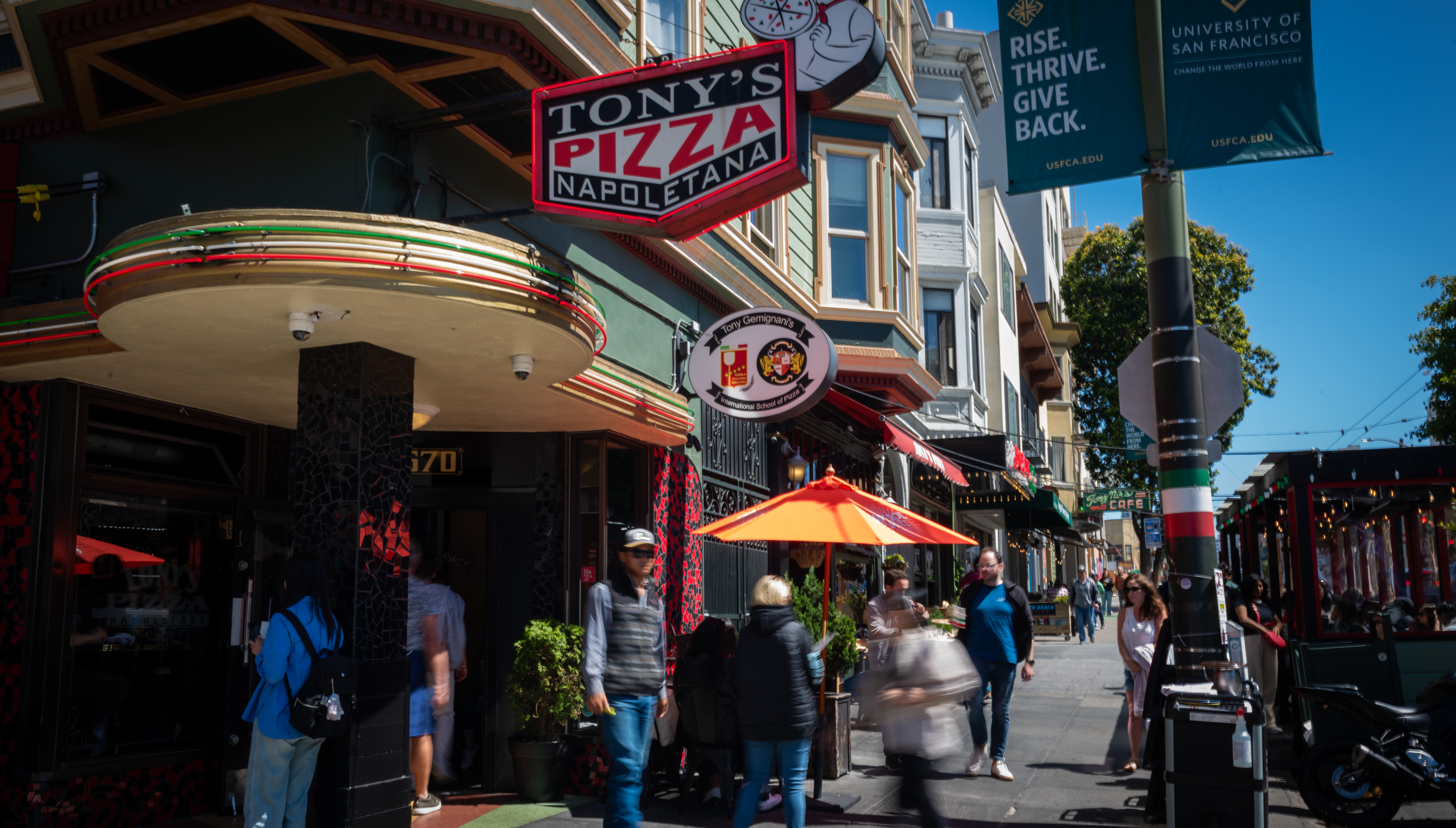
- Tony's Pizza Napoletana in North Beach, San Francisco
- Interactive map of Tony’s Pizza Napoletana

Restaurant information
- Established: 2009
- Owner: Tony Gemignani
- Food type: Italian pizzeria
- Location: 1570 Stockton St, San Francisco, California, 94133, United States
- Coordinates: 37.80033°N 122.40902°W
- Website: tonyspizzanapoletana.com

Tony's Pizza Napoletana is a pizzeria located in San Francisco, California on Stockton Street which serves Neapolitan styled pizza, among many other styles. In 2015, it was considered the 5th highest rated pizzeria in the United States by TripAdvisor.

Tony's has three different types of oven used for various forms of pizza.

== History ==
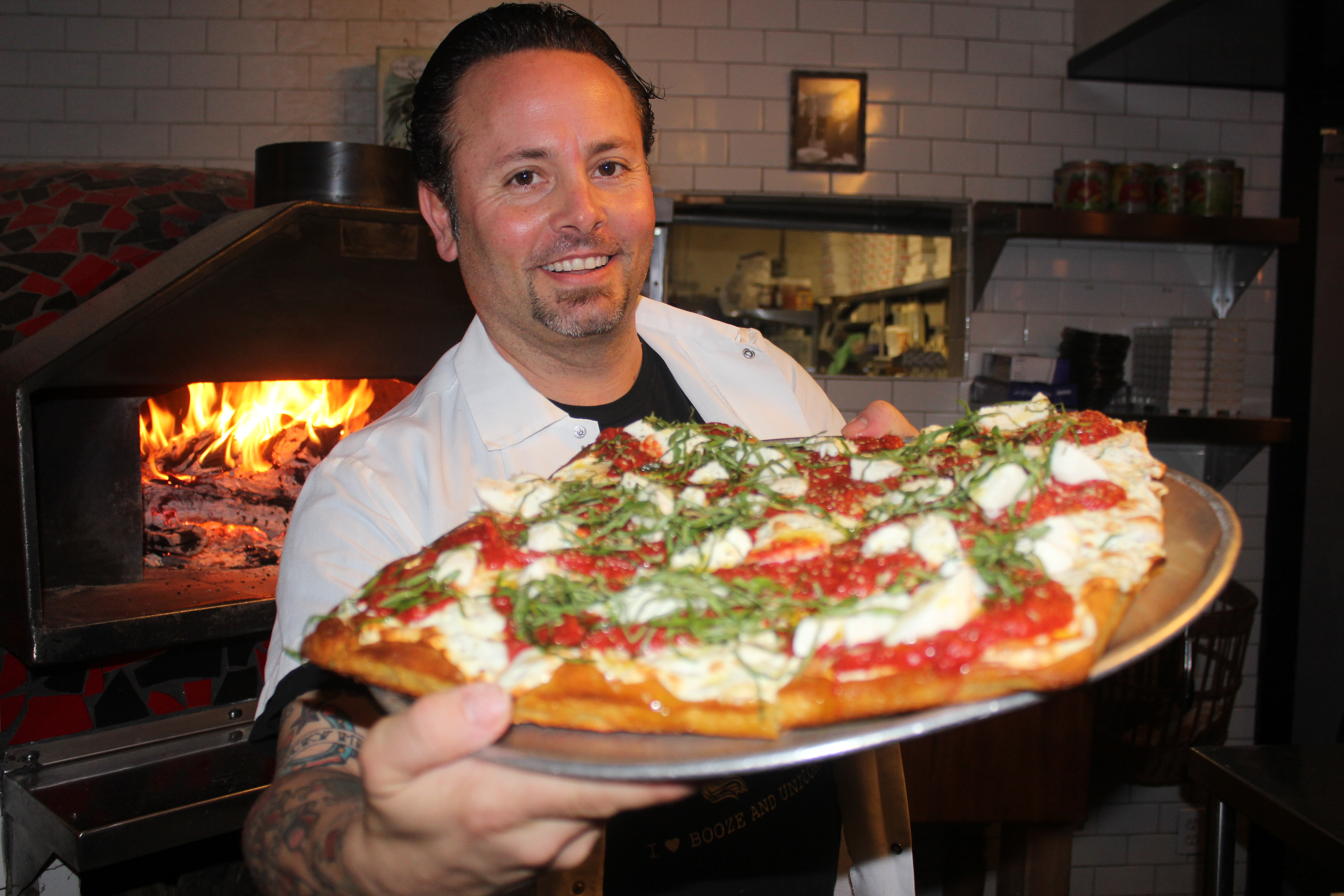
Tony Gemignani

Tony Gemignani has been involved with pizza since 1991. In 2009 he opened Tony's Pizza Napoletana. The restaurant is considered among the top 20 essential San Francisco pizzas by San Francisco Eater.

== See also ==
- List of Italian restaurants
