= Kristina Matisic =

Croatian-born Canadian actor and television host

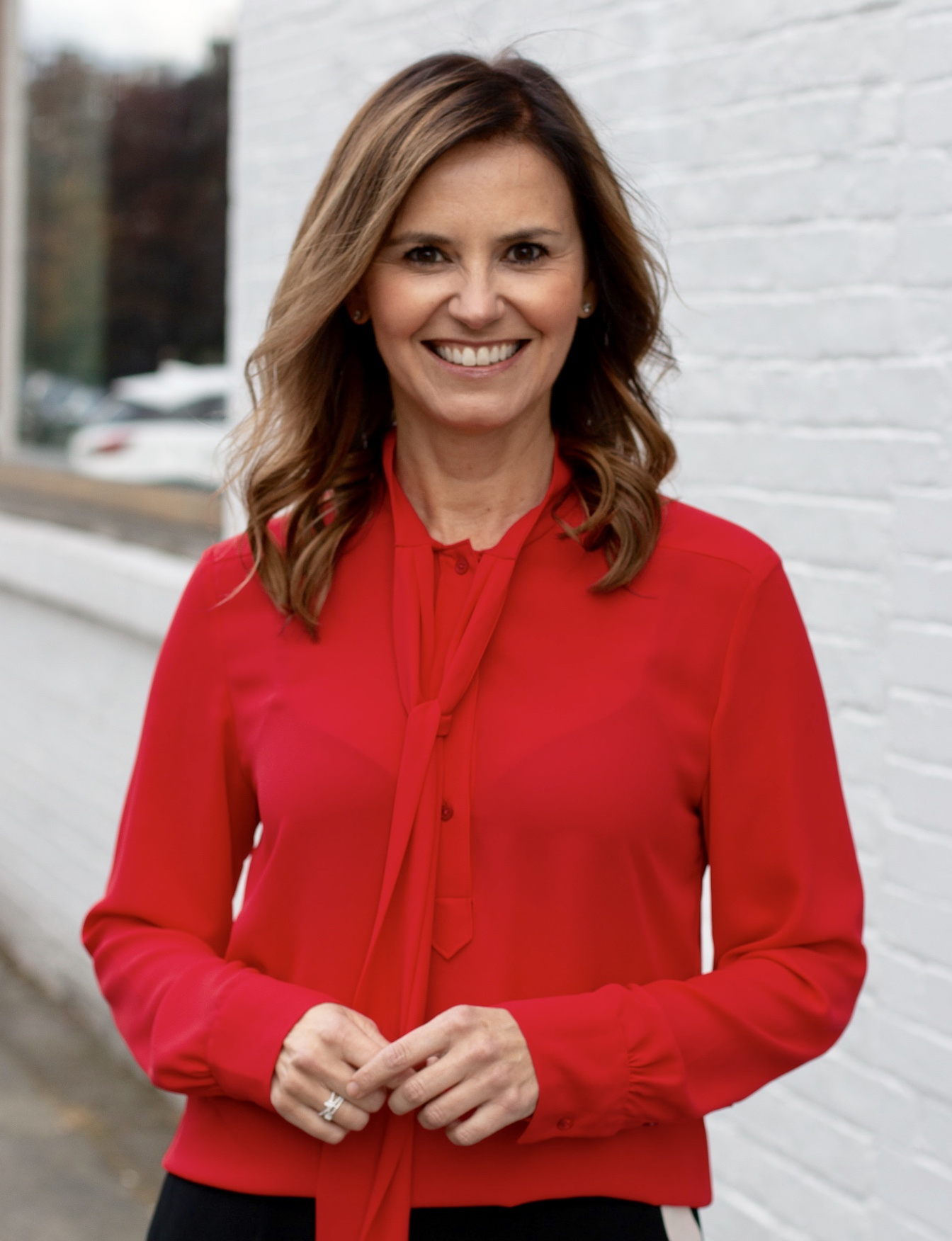
- Actor and TV Host Kristina Matisic
- Born: December 26, 1968 (age 57); Zagreb, SR Croatia, SFR Yugoslavia
- Education: BA from University of British Columbia MA from University of Southern California
- Occupations: actor, television host, television producer, news anchor, news announcer, reporter, author, content creator

Kristina Matisic (born December 26, 1968) is an actor and TV host. She is best known as the host, with Anna Wallner, of The Shopping Bags, Anna & Kristina's Grocery Bag, and Anna & Kristina's Beauty Call.

Matisic was born in Zagreb, Croatia. She has a bachelor's degree in history from the University of British Columbia and a master's degree in broadcast journalism from the University of Southern California.

In 1993, Matisic started her career in broadcasting as a news announcer on Mountain FM. The following year, she began working at CKVU-TV in Vancouver, as an overnight news anchor for Global News, an associate producer and a reporter. In 1997, she was the news anchor and producer of that station's 11:30 pm newscast.

Matisic is currently working as an actor, content creator and public relations expert.

== Television career ==
=== Television host and actor ===
==== The Shopping Bags ====
While there, Matisic met Anna Wallner and created The Shopping Bags concept. Their show has won numerous Leo awards and two Gemini award nominations. They maintain an extensive website that includes product reviews and shopping tips and they write for numerous publications across North America. They are also co-authors of the book, The Shopping Bags: Tips, Tricks and Inside Information to Make You a Savvy Shopper.

== Personal life ==
Matisic appeared in Final Destination as reporter Marilyn Eckerle. In January 2009, she was living in Vancouver, British Columbia.

Appeared in The Outer Limits, episode Essence of Life as "News Anchor" in 1999. Appeared in The Outer Limits, episode Decompression as "Reporter" in 2000.
