= Harry Kambolis =

Restaurateur

- Born: March 30, 1968 (age 58)
- Occupations: restaurateur, author

Harry Kambolis (born June 30, 1968) is a restaurateur who owned and operated Raincity Grill (1992–2014), C Restaurant (1997–2014), and Nu (2005–2011).

In the early 1990s, Kambolis built relationships with local farmers and producers of quality ingredients and served and promoted what later became known as Pacific Northwest cuisine. He also supported British Columbian wines, a burgeoning industry at the time, long before it was in vogue. By offering wines only from British Columbia and the American Northwest, and by having a formidable "wines by the glass" program, Kambolis developed a successful business model that later was emulated.

The opening of C Restaurant, in 1997, created another opportunity for Kambolis to demonstrate his commitment to regional bounty. The restaurant's mandate was to look beyond the typically homogenized selection of seafood available on menus around the world. Kambolis, in tandem with his chefs Soren Fakstorp and Robert Clark, sourced and introduced about 60 local varieties of the highest quality seafoods, all of which were locally harvested. C Restaurant was credited with introducing and popularizing several British Columbia seafoods (some back from extinction, some unfamiliar to the market), including geoduck, sablefish, pink salmon, and British Columbia abalone.

Kambolis is the co-author, with Chef Robert Clark, of the cookbook C Food.
