= Spécialités de la Maison =

1940 cookbook by Christine Schwartz Hartley and Graydon Carter

- First edition
- Author: Christine Schwartz Hartley, Graydon Carter
- Genre: Cookbook
- Publisher: The American Friends of France
- Publication date: 1940
- Publication place: United States

Spécialités de la Maison is a cookbook containing more than 200 recipes by a wide array of early 20th Century celebrities and socialites. The book was originally published in 1940 under the direction of Anne Morgan in order to raise funds for her nonprofit organization, the American Friends of France, which sought to bring relief to the French population in wartime. Reprinted in 1949, Spécialités de la Maison includes recipes by Salvador Dalí, Christian Dior, Katharine Hepburn, Charlie Chaplin, and Helen Keller.

Most recently, Spécialités de la Maison was reprinted with a preface and select biographies by former Art + Auction editor Christine Schwartz Hartley and a foreword by Vanity Fair editor Graydon Carter.
