= Anna Wallner =

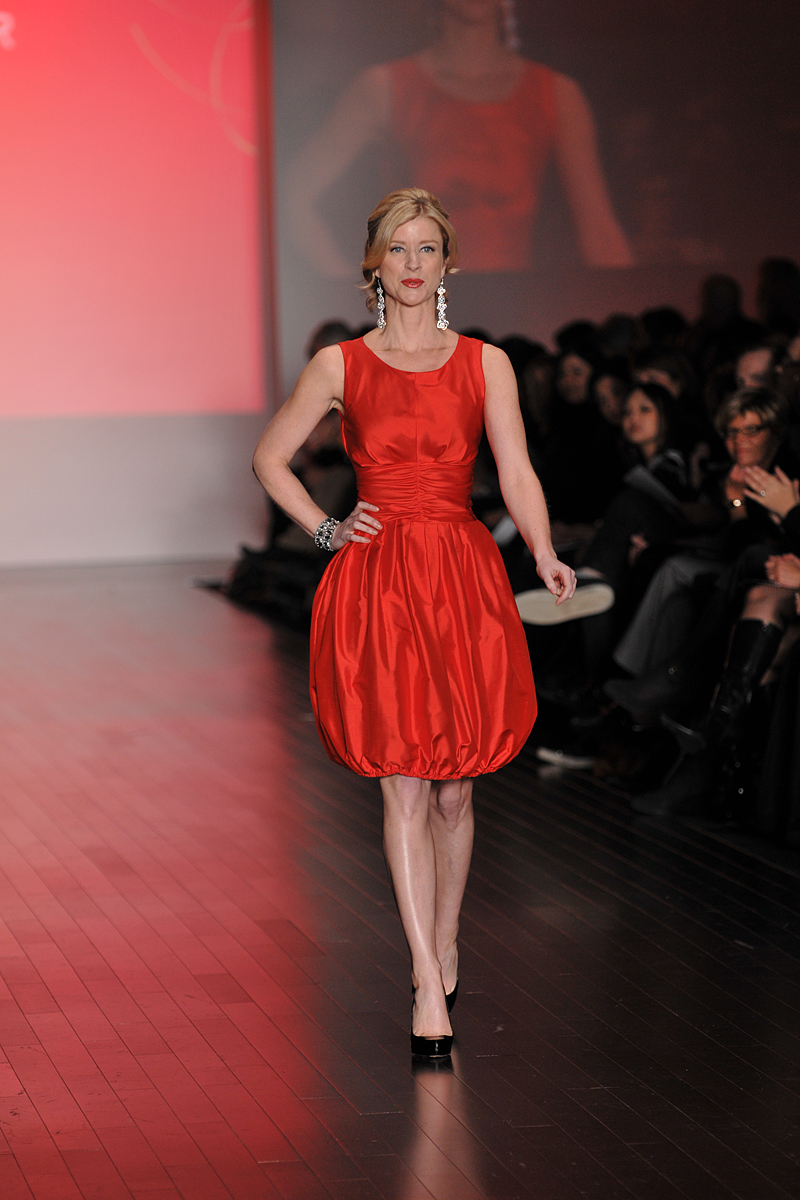
- Wallner modelling in the Heart Truth fashion show
- Born: October 31, 1969 (age 55); Toronto, Ontario, Canada
- Occupation(s): Host, The Shopping Bags, Anna & Kristina's Beauty Call & Anna & Kristina's Grocery Bag

Anna Wallner (born October 31, 1969) is the host, with Kristina Matisic, of The Shopping Bags, Anna & Kristina's Grocery Bag, and Anna & Kristina's Beauty Call. She is from Toronto, Ontario. She was a reporter for Global News (Vancouver) in 1994.

== Education ==
Wallner attended the University of British Columbia, where she received her Bachelor of Arts Degree. She continued her education to complete her graduate studies in journalism at University of King's College in Halifax. In 1994, she began her television career as a reporter for Global News in Vancouver. Anna was voted Broadcaster of Tomorrow by the BC Broadcasters Association in 1999 and in 2000 she was nominated for a prestigious Webster award for her work as a health reporter.

== Television ==
Wallner was an anchor/reporter for Your Health on CKVU-TV in Vancouver from 1994-99. Wallner and Matisic came up with the idea for The Shopping Bags in 1999. The program has won eight Leo awards and two Gemini award nominations. Together, they maintain an extensive website that includes their product reviews and shopping tips. In addition, the two have a production company titled Worldwide Bag Media, Inc. The production company had produced two programs for the W Network including Anna & Kristina's Beauty Call & Anna & Kristina's Grocery Bag. A third show titled Anna & Kristina's Beauty Call debuted on January 1, 2009 on W.

With Mastisic, the two have made regular guest appearances on Good Morning America, The Rachael Ray Show, Canada AM and CBC Newsworld. In addition to a syndicated column in the US, their work has appeared in magazines including InStyle, Glow and TV Week.

In 2009, Wallner was nominated for several Leo Awards including:

- Best Information or Lifestyle Series
- Best Hosts in an Information or Lifestyle Series
