= Christine Schwartz Hartley =

Christine Schwartz Hartley (born August 12, 1965, in Saint-Étienne, France) is an editor, writer and translator living in Brooklyn. She is a contributing editor of Sotheby's magazine, former deputy editor of Art+Auction and contributor to such publications as Architectural Digest, Sotheby's magazine and Sothebys.com, Bookforum, Interior Design, Elle Decor and the New York Times Book Review. Her translations from French include Marcelle Sauvageot's Commentary, Angèle Kingué's Venus of Khala-Kanti, Christian Salmon's Kate Moss: The Making of an Icon and Alain Mabanckou's novel, African Psycho. She is responsible for a reissue of Spécialités de la Maison, a cookbook featuring recipes by early 20th-century icons and socialites. The book was originally compiled in 1940 under the direction of Anne Morgan to raise funds for her nonprofit organization, American Friends of France.
