= Li (TV channel) =

Life Inspired (Li)
- Country: Malaysia; Singapore
- Headquarters: Kuala Lumpur, Malaysia; Singapore

Programming
- Picture format: 1080i 16:9 HDTV

History
- Launched: 18 August 2009; 1 October 2010 (Malaysia)
- Closed: 7 October 2017

Links
- Website: Official Website

Li (Life Inspired) was a 24-hour Asian lifestyle high-definition television network in Malaysia and Singapore. It launched on 18 August 2009. Before 1st October 2010, Li initially timeshared with another channel, Food Network on Astro channel 706. (which the channel slot was named "Astro Lifestyle HD") Li featured programming focused on lifestyle topics such as food, home, wellness, travel and style.

The channel is owned by Li TV International Limited and operated by Li TV Asia Sdn Bhd. Its operational headquarters are located in Kuala Lumpur, Malaysia, with regional offices in Singapore and Hong Kong.

The channel was not available in the StarHub TV Singapore HyppTV Malaysia and Philippines.

Star Publications Sdn Bhd served as the airtime sales agent for the channel.

== Closure ==
On 12 July 2017, Li TV officially announced that it would shutdown on October the same year. The channel concluded operations at midnight on 7 October 2017. The decision was attributed to financial losses, totaling US$1.62 million (RM6.96 million) for the financial year ending in 2017, amidst challenges within the media industry.

== Programming ==
The channels airs international content (programmes from Australia, Europe and the United States), as well as Asia content.

Li featured six content belts:

1. Li Ultimate – prime time programmes
2. Li Body – wellness programmes
3. Li Savour – food programmes
4. Li East – Asian programmes
5. Li Chic – style programmes
6. Li Space – home programmes

== Sources ==
- "About Li, Life Inspired". Litvchannel.com.
