= Peter Ishkhans =

Peter Ishkhans is a former Beverly Hills, California-based stylist and salon owner who went on to host Style Network's Peter Perfect. In 2009, Peter Perfect was nominated for a Daytime Emmy as outstanding lifestyle show, while Ishkhans was nominated for outstanding lifestyle host.
