= Rose Levy Beranbaum =

American writer and blogger

- Born: 1944 (age 81–82)
- Education: NYU Steinhardt
- Occupation: Cookbook Author
- Spouse: Woody Wolston (2021-present)
- Writing career
- Period: 1981-present
- Notable work: The Cake Bible
- Notable awards: James Beard Foundation Award; 1989 The Cake Bible – Baking and Desserts; 1989 The Cake Bible – Book of the Year; 1991 Rose's Christmas Cookies – Baking and Desserts
- Website: realbakingwithrose.com

Rose Levy Beranbaum is an American baker, cookbook author and blogger.

She pioneered (but did not name) the reverse creaming technique of cake-mixing. In this process, the fat and flour are mixed first before adding the remaining ingredients. By coating the flour in fat, gluten development is inhibited, helping to prevent toughness. This is in contrast to the usual creaming technique, which first mixes fat and sugar. This method is also called the paste method.

Beranbaum has noted that she was heavily influenced by Julia Child and James Beard.

She has been married to Woody Wolston since 2021.

== Bibliography ==
- Romantic & Classic Cakes (1981)
- The Cake Bible (1988)
- Rose's Christmas Cookies (1990)
- Rose's Celebrations (1992)
- Rose's Melting Pot: A Cooking Tour of America's Ethnic Celebrations (1994)
- The Pie and Pastry Bible (1998)
- The Bread Bible (2003)
- Rose's Heavenly Cakes (2009)
- The Baking Bible (2014)
- Rose's Baking Basics (2018)
- Rose's Ice Cream Bliss (2020)
- The Cookie Bible (2022)
- The Cake Bible 35th Anniversary Edition (2024)

=== Also ===
- A Passion for Chocolate by Bernachon, Bernachon, Guarnaschelli, and Lee; Translated (1989)
- What Do Women REALLY Want? Chocolate! by Donna L. Barstow; Foreword (2004)
