= Virginia Willis =

American chef and food writer (born 1966)

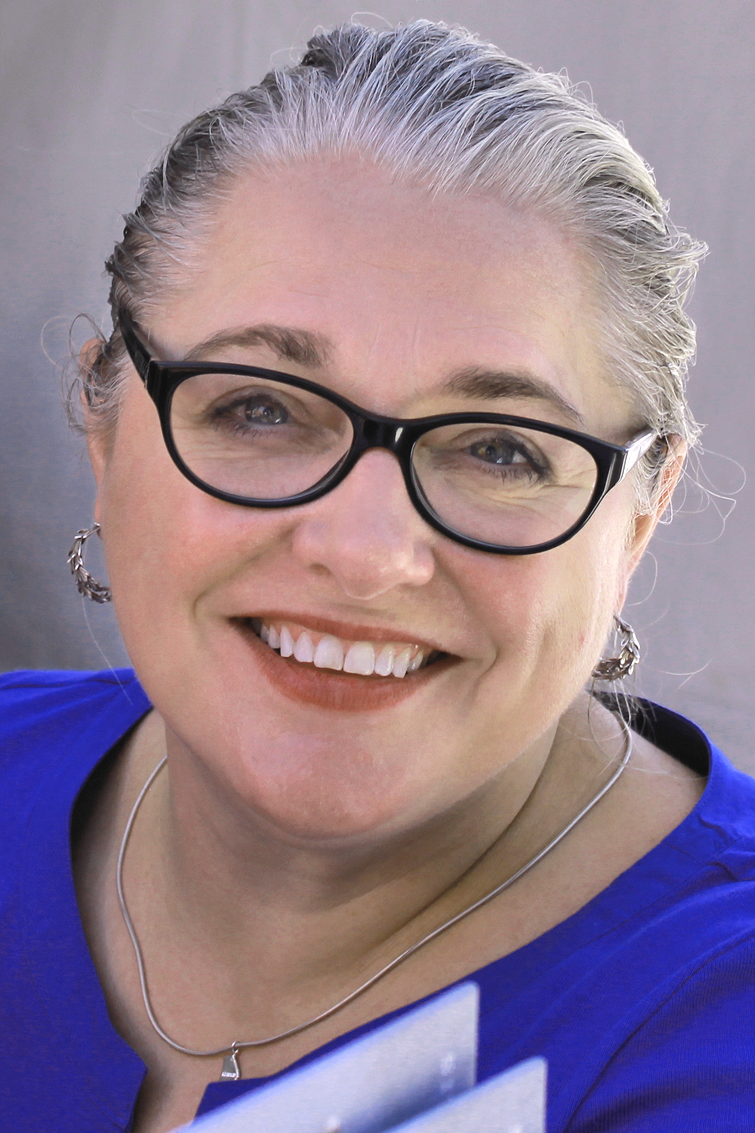
- Born: Georgia
- Occupations: Chef, food writer, and content creator
- Website: virginiawillis.com

Virginia Willis (born December 29, 1966) is a James Beard Award-winning cookbook author, chef, and on-air personality who specializes in Southern American cooking.

== Early life and education ==
Virginia was born in Augusta, Georgia. As a child, she lived in Alexandria, Louisiana, where she learned about Cajun and Creole cuisine. In middle school her family relocated back to Georgia.

After earning a B.A. from the University of Georgia she attended the L'Académie de Cuisine in Maryland (graduating 1994) and the École de Cuisine LaVarenne in Burgundy, France (Grande Diplome, 1995).

== Career ==
Willis apprenticed to Southern food authority Nathalie Dupree, and then worked as the test kitchen director on Dupree's PBS cooking series. She has also worked as an editorial assistant to French cooking authority Anne Willan and as a Kitchen Director for celebrity television hosts Martha Stewart and Bobby Flay.

She has produced and directed television shows as Epicurious (The Discovery Channel), and Home Plate (2003). Currently she produces culinary video through Culinary Media Training and Productions, co-founded with colleague Cynthia Graubart.

=== Television appearances ===
Willis has appeared on Food Network Kitchen, CBS This Morning, Fox and Friends, Martha Stewart Living, Chopped (2007), Paula's Best Dishes (2008), and Throwdown! with Bobby Flay. She placed second on an episode of Food Network's Chopped (“Bird in the Pan”) that aired on November 27, 2012. She also competed in Alex vs America in 2025.

== Awards ==
- 2018: “25 Books all Georgians Should Read” for Secrets of the Southern Table; Georgia Center for the Book
- 2016: James Beard Foundation Award of Excellence
- 2016: Finalist International Association of Culinary Professionals Best American Cookbook
- 2009: “25 Books all Georgians Should Read” for Bon Appétit, Y’all; Georgia Center for the Book
- 2008: Finalist for the International Association of Culinary Professionals Best American Cookbook (Bon Appétit, Y’all

== Bibliography ==
- Secrets of the Southern Table (Houghton Mifflin Harcourt 2018)
- Lighten Up, Y'all (Ten Speed Press, March 2015)
- Okra: A Savor the South Cookbook (The University of North Carolina Press, 2014)
- Volume 5: Grits (Short Stack Editions, 2013)
- Basic to Brilliant, Y'all (Ten Speed Press, 2011)
- Bon Appétit, Y'all (Ten Speed Press, 2008)
