= Naomi Duguid =

Canadian food writer (born 1950)

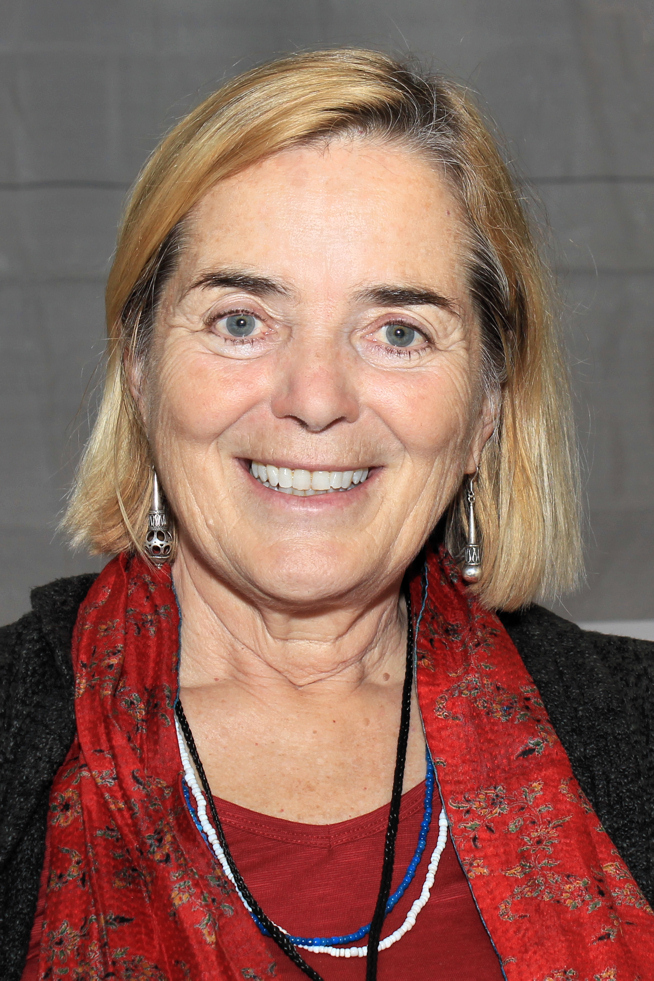
- Duguid at the 2016 Texas Book Festival
- Born: 1950 (age 75–76); Ottawa, Ontario, Canada
- Education: Queen's University
- Occupation: Food writer
- Spouse: Jeffrey Alford (m. 1985; div. 2009)
- Children: Tashi Alford-Duguid, and Dominic Alford-Duguid
- Website: naomiduguid.com

Naomi Duguid (born 1950) is a Canadian food writer and photographer. Duguid is based in Toronto and has coauthored six cookbooks, and well as Burma: Rivers of Flavor in 2012. She is best known for her cookbooks co-written with her then-husband Jeffrey Alford.

Duguid attended Queen's University in Kingston, Ontario, and proceeded through law school. After travelling around the world, Naomi met Jeffrey Alford in Tibet in 1985 and the two were soon married. She quit her job as a lawyer and went into writing cookbooks in 1995. She jointly put out five books with her husband on world cooking. Their books won the James Beard Foundation's Cookbook of the Year award in 1996 and 2001 as well as Cuisine Canada Cookbook Award in 1999 and 2004.

In total, she won a 5 James Beard Foundation Awards including Best Food Photography in 2001.

Naomi also served as a board of trustees of the Oxford Food Symposium.

Alford and Duguid have two sons, Tashi Alford-Duguid, and Dominic Alford-Duguid, and they lived in Toronto, Canada until they separated in 2009. Naomi Duguid continues to live in Toronto, and Jeffrey Alford lived in Thailand until he passed in Jan 2024.

== Books ==
- Flatbreads and Flavors: A Culinary Atlas (ISBN 0-688-11411-3, 1995)
- Home Baking: Sweet and Savory Traditions from Around the World (ISBN 1-57965-174-7, 2003)
- Hot Sour Salty Sweet: A Culinary Journey Through Southeast Asia (ISBN 1-57965-114-3, 2000)
- Seductions of Rice (ISBN 1-57965-234-4, 1998)
- Mangoes and Curry Leaves: Culinary Travels Through the Great Subcontinent (ISBN 1-57965-252-2, 2005)
- Beyond the Great Wall: Recipes and Travels in the Other China (ISBN 1-57965-301-4, 2008)
- Burma: Rivers of Flavor (ISBN 978-1-57965-413-9, 2012)
- Taste of Persia: A Cook's Travels Through Armenia, Azerbaijan, Georgia, Iran, and Kurdistan (ISBN 978-1579-6554-8-8, 2016)
- The Miracle of Salt: Recipes and Techniques to Preserve, Ferment, and Transform Your Food (ISBN 978-1579659448, 2022)
