= Jeffrey Alford =

Canadian food writer

Jeffrey Alford was a Canadian food writer, best known for cookbooks co-written with his ex-wife Naomi Duguid.

Alford was born in 1954 or 1955, and was raised in Laramie, Wyoming. He graduated from high school there in 1972, and earned a master's degree in creative writing at the University of Wyoming. After leaving Wyoming, he lived in Ireland and traveled the world.

He met Duguid on a bike trip in Tibet in 1985 and they were married in early 1986. They had two sons, and lived in Toronto, Ontario, Canada. The couple separated in 2009, and Alford went on to live in a small village in Northern Thailand. In January 2024, Duguid posted on Instagram that Alford had died that month in Thailand at the age of 69.

== Books ==
- Flatbreads and Flavors: A Culinary Atlas (ISBN 0-688-11411-3, 1995)
- Seductions of Rice (ISBN 1-57965-234-4, 1998)
- Hot Sour Salty Sweet: A Culinary Journey Through Southeast Asia (ISBN 1-57965-114-3, 2000)
- Home Baking: Sweet and Savory Traditions from Around the World (ISBN 1-57965-174-7, 2003)
- Mangoes and Curry Leaves: Culinary Travels Through the Great Subcontinent (ISBN 1-57965-252-2, 2005)
- Beyond the Great Wall: Recipes and Travels in the Other China (ISBN 1-57965-301-4, 2008)
- Chicken in the Mango Tree: Food and Life in a Thai-Khmer Village (ISBN 9-78177162-060-4, 2015)
