= Irena Chalmers =

American writer

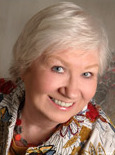
- Born: June 5, 1935; London, England
- Died: April 4, 2020 (aged 84); Kingston, New York, US
- Occupations: Author, Writer, Speaker, Teacher, Mentor
- Years active: 1963 - 2020
- Children: Hilary Chalmers & Philip Kirshman

Irena Chalmers-Taylor (June 5, 1935 – April 4, 2020) was an author and food commentator/essayist, teacher and culinary mentor. Named "the culinary oracle of 100 cookbooks" by noted American restaurant critic and journalist, Gael Greene, Chalmers was recognized as the pioneer of the single subject cookbook. Her life story revealed an unlikely journey to becoming a James Beard Foundation "Who's Who" of Food and Beverage in America 1988 Award Recipient.

Chalmers died on April 4, 2020, from esophageal cancer. At the time of her death, she was working on her memoir, Spilling The Beans.

== Biography ==
Chalmers began her career as a nurse and midwife. After completing her graduate work at the Neurological Institute in Queens Square, London, she moved to the United States in 1959 to teach neuroanatomy and neurophysiology at Columbia-Presbyterian Hospital's Neurological Institute of New York.

Returning briefly to London to attend the Le Cordon Bleu London, Chalmers opened her own cooking school first in Baltimore, MD, then in Greensboro, NC. She went on to become a gourmet shop owner and wine importer, an award-winning publisher, restaurant consultant, adjunct professor, columnist and mentor. She was a frequent commentator and keynote speaker on food and food trends. Her work appeared in The New York Times, Food & Wine, Gourmet, Gastronomica, Food Arts and Nation's Restaurant News.

Chalmers was a food essayist, The Last Word columnist for Chef Magazine, as well as a commentator on WAMC/Northeast Public Radio, while serving as a consultant, food blogger, and mentor to many embarking on their culinary adventures. She retired from The Culinary Institute of America, after teaching Professional Food Writing, Food Jobs and Gastronomy for nearly 16 years.

== Author and publisher ==
In 1968, when faced with how to get rid of six fondue pots languishing in her cooking school/wine and cheese shop, La Bonne Femme, Chalmers demonstrated the 'fine art' of melting cheese. This cooking demonstration led to the publication of Fondue Cook-In, Chocolate Surprises, numerous timely, popular single subject cookbooks and the creation of Potpourri Press.

Chalmers also wrote other specialty cookbooks for specific cooking appliances, including the first microwave oven cookbook for Litton, the first ice cream cookbook for Donvier ice cream machines and several cookbooks commissioned by Le Creuset. The most successful of these small books was Napkin Folds for the Lillian Vernon catalog, responsible for sales of more than one million copies. Estimated total sales of the small cookbooks exceeded seven million copies worldwide.

As an editor, publisher and packager, Chalmers oversaw and contributed to many award-winning, successful cookbook series and food guides, including: the 'Round the World cookbooks (8 million copies sold); The Great American Cooking Schools 12-book series (designed by renowned graphic designer, Milton Glaser), winner of the Art Directors Club Award and eight R. T. French Tastemaker Awards; Books by Cooks, a 24-book series; and the Creative Cook volumes. Chalmers was the first to publish the work of many American culinary leaders, among them: Romantic & Classic Cakes by Rose Levy Beranbaum, American Food & California Wine by Barbara Kafka, Quiche & Pâté by Peter Kump and Christmas Feasts from History by Lorna Sass. She compiled The Food Professional's Guide in association with The James Beard Foundation with a foreword by Julia Child.

Chalmers was the author of The Great American Food Almanac, American Bistro and The Great Food Almanac, winner of the International Association of Culinary Professionals (IACP)'s prestigious Julia Child Cookbook Award, Her book, Great Food Jobs 2: Ideas and Inspiration for Your Job Hunt received a 2013 Gourmand Special Jury Award for excellence. Her prior Food Jobs: 150 Great Jobs for Culinary Students, Career Changers and Food Lovers won the 2008 Gourmand World Cookbook Award for the Best Book for Food Professionals in the U.S. and later, the 2008 Gourmand World Cookbook Award—Best Book for Food Professionals in the World.

Chalmers was a founding member and past president of the IACP, a culinary worldwide organization of nearly 4,000 members from more than 40 countries. She also was a founding member and past president of Les Dames d'Escoffier International (LDEI). LDEI is an invitation-only organization of women leaders in food, beverage and hospitality whose mission is education, advocacy and philanthropy.

She held a number of consulting roles at the restaurants, the Rainbow Room and Windows on the World. She worked closely for American restaurant icon Joe Baum for 14 years. She was a consultant for Epicurious.com, CuisineNet.com, FamilyTime.com, and Modern Maturity magazine, (today, AARP magazine). In addition, Chalmers was a visiting professor at New York University and the New School for Social Research and an associate of the International Food Information Council (IFIC) on Food Biotechnology and BIO: Council for Biotechnology Information Bureau.

== Awards ==
Throughout her career Chalmers was recognized with several distinguished awards including: James Beard Foundation "Who's Who" Award Winner (1988 - the first year the awards were presented), Woman of the Year, New York University Center for Food and Hotel Management (1989) and 12 Tastemaker Awards for publications she wrote or published. She received the Honor of La Bonne Vie Champenoise Award and The Doctorate of Foodservice for Exemplary Service to the Food Service Industry. She was an Ambassador of The Culinary Institute of America.

== Selected publications ==
- Great Food Jobs 2: Ideas and Inspiration for Your Job Hunt (2013)
- Food Jobs: 150 Great Jobs for Culinary Students, Career Changers and Food Lovers (2008)
- The Great Food Almanac (1994)
- Good Old Food-A Taste From The Past (1993)
- The Working Family's Cookbook (1993)
- The Food Professional's Guide (1990)
- Irena Chalmers' All-Time Favorites (1990)
- Christmas Memories with Recipes (1988)
- The Great American Christmas Almanac (1988)
- The Great American Food Almanac (1986)
- American Bistro (1986)
- Home for the Holidays (1980)
- Beginner's Book of Beautiful Food (1976)
- The Confident Cook (1975)
- Countless single subject cookbooks
