= Ethel G. Hofman =

Jewish American food and travel columnist

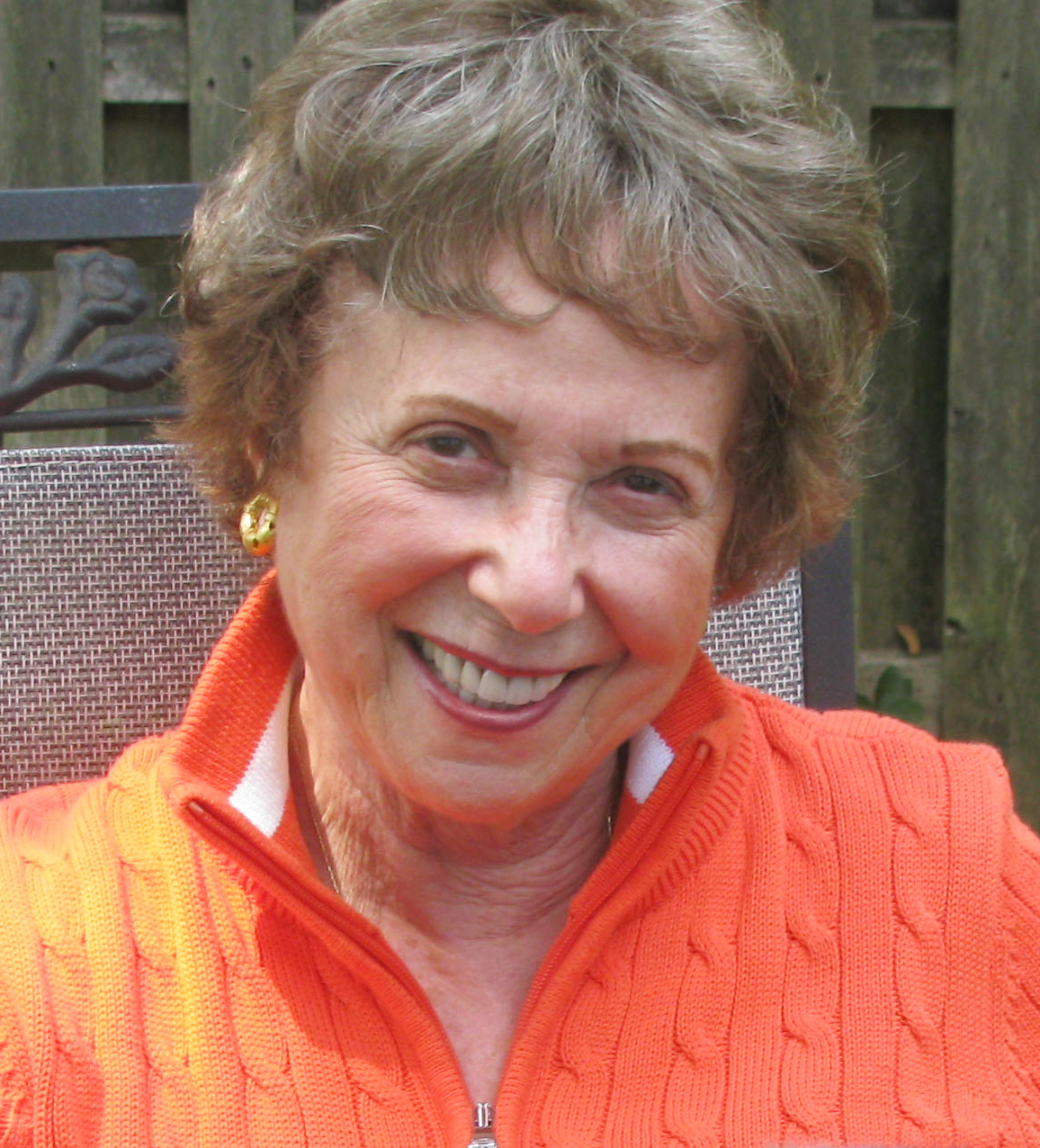
- 2012 portrait of Ethel G. Hofman
- Born: Ethel Greenwald; 1939 (age 86–87); Glasgow, Scotland
- Education: Glasgow College of Domestic Science; University of Chicago
- Culinary career
- Cooking style: Jewish, Israeli, British

Ethel Greenwald Hofman (born 1939) is a widely syndicated Jewish American food and travel columnist, author and culinary consultant. She is a recognized authority on international Jewish foods and culture, with special emphasis on Israel and the United Kingdom.

== Early life ==
Hofman was born in Glasgow, Scotland, one of three children to Jean and Harry Greenwald. In 1914, when her father, grandfather and paternal uncles left Russia, they thought they were going to America. They wound up in Lerwick in Scotland's Shetland Islands, over 300 miles from the closest Jewish community. In 1935, her father married Jean Segal, who had grown up in Scotland. Ethel's parents moved back to Lerwick when she was six weeks old. There they became small shopkeepers, with their variety store selling everything "from candy to condoms." Even though the Greenwalds constituted the Jewish population of the island, the family maintained a strong Jewish identity. Jean Segal Greenwald had been brought up in an Orthodox Jewish household, could read Hebrew, and spoke Yiddish with her husband. During World War II, from 1941 to 1945, Jean Greenwald annually organized Passover seders for British troops. The first was conducted by Sir Israel Brodie, who went on to become Chief Rabbi of Great Britain.

Following her graduation from Glasgow College of Domestic Science in 1959, Hofman moved to Chicago to live with an aunt. She took a one-year dietetic internship at the University of Chicago, and then served for three-and-a-half years as Chief Administrative Dietitian at Michael Reese Hospital, where she met her husband. After moving for two years to Basel, Switzerland, and then to Boston (where she was a nutritionist at the Harvard School of Public Health under Professor Jean Mayer), she settled with her family in Philadelphia.

Hofman's husband, Dr. Walter I. Hofman, is a forensic pathologist who was elected coroner in Montgomery County, Pennsylvania. The couple has two children.

== Culinary career ==
Hofman came to cooking, and Jewish cooking in particular, in her mother's kitchen. She studied continental cuisine with local chefs during her years in Switzerland, and advanced gourmet cooking at Le Cordon Bleu in London. In Philadelphia, she established The Instant Gourmet, that city's first cooking school. She also met and worked with some of the leading figures in the industry, including Emeril Lagasse, Jacques Pépin and Julia Child, from whom she took master cooking classes. In 1995, she was elected president of the International Association of Culinary Professionals.

=== Philosophy and reception ===
Hofman's food philosophy and recipes have been described as uncomplicated: "'fresh, fast and easy' is her basic approach," with a focus on "healthy cooking". Her Jewish home cooking recipes emphasize "convenience foods wherever possible, so that many of these dishes require the least possible time and effort … The result is both healthy simplicity and lively good taste."

Her written works have been well received by critics, especially her cookbook Everyday Cooking for the Jewish Home and memoir Mackerel at Midnight.

== Journalism career ==
=== Print journalism ===
Hofman began writing on culinary subjects in 1980. She was a feature writer for The Philadelphia Inquirer and Philadelphia's Jewish Exponent, and from 1985 to 2011 served as Food Editor for the Baltimore Jewish Times. Her feature articles have appeared in publications such as Gastronomica, TeaTime and over a dozen other publications. She was a syndicated columnist with Knight-Ridder and self-syndicated her culinary columns to American Jewish newspapers. By 2005, her columns appeared in some 20 Jewish newspapers, including the Washington Jewish Week, Chicago Jewish Star and the Jewish News of Greater Phoenix.

=== Broadcast journalism ===
Hofman has made guest appearances on national television and radio, including Cooking Live on the Food Network.

== Awards and recognition ==
- 2011: Honorary Doctor of the university, Glasgow Caledonian University
- 2009: Alumni Achievement Award, Glasgow Caledonian University
- 1995-96: President, International Association of Culinary Professionals
- 1995: Doctorate of Food Service (DFS), North American Association of Food Equipment Manufacturers http://www.nafem.org/
- 1994: Vice-president, International Association of Culinary Professionals
- Member, Les Dames d'Escoffier

== Books ==
- Mackerel at Midnight: Growing Up Jewish on a Remote Scottish Island (Philadelphia: Camino Books, 2005; Edinburgh: Mercat Press, 2006)
- The Art of Cooking: Recipes & Techniques (Cooking Club of America, 2001)
- Everyday Cooking for the Jewish Home: More than 350 Delectable Recipes (HarperCollins, 1997)
- The Family Cookbook (1991)
- Making Food Beautiful (East Woods Press, 1982)
