= Rochelle Huppin =

American chef, restaurateur and small business owner

Rochelle Huppin is an American chef, restaurateur and small business owner with projects based in Chicago, Illinois, and Culver City, California. After graduating from The Culinary Institute of America (CIA) in 1987, Huppin founded Chefwear, Inc, a company that provides culinary apparel to the hospitality industry, in 1990

Huppin was one of the founding partners and Executive Pastry Chef at beacon: An Asian Cafe, before it closed its doors to the public in 2011.

== Biography ==
Born on May 3, 1962 in Spokane, Washington, Huppin attended the University of California, Los Angeles. She graduated from UCLA in 1984 with a Bachelor of Arts in Literature and Languages. Post-graduation, Huppin enrolled in The Culinary Institute of America (CIA) in Hyde Park, New York. Huppin graduated in 1987 with an advanced degree in culinary arts and went on to specialize in pastries.

While in culinary school, Huppin found the need for more flattering and comfortable uniforms for the kitchen. She designed a pair of 100-percent cotton pants for herself, which was different than the usual polyester pants that were issued every year. In 1990, Huppin founded Chefwear, Inc, a company that features contemporary chef clothing. As the company continued to grow, Huppin stepped away from the kitchen for good in 1992 to focus on Chefwear, Inc.

Over the years, Huppin has become a prominent woman in the industry. She was elected President of the Women Chefs and Restaurateurs organization in 2011. Huppin is also an avid supporter of The James Beard Foundation, Les Dames d'Escoffier, the American Culinary Federation, and the International Association of Culinary Professionals.

== Culinary Background ==
Huppin worked part-time during her senior year at UCLA, planting and tending the first herb garden at the Hotel Bel-Air. She then attended the Culinary Institute of America. In 1987, upon graduation from the CIA, Huppin secured the position of Pastry Assistant with Michel Richard's Citrus Restaurant during the year it opened on Melrose Avenue in Los Angeles. She later returned to the Hotel Bel-Air as Assistant Pastry Chef and was subsequently promoted to Executive Pastry Chef, working alongside the hotel's Executive Chef George Morrone. Following this, Huppin worked as the Pastry Chef at Angeli Restaurant for Evan Kleiman, before heading to Northern California to serve as the opening pastry Chef for Bradley Ogden and Michael Dellar's Lark Creek Inn in Larkspur, California. Rochelle then moved back to Los Angeles to work for Wolfgang Puck & Barbara Lazaroff at their restaurants: Spago, located in West Hollywood at the time and Chinois on Main in Santa Monica, California. Huppin served on the opening crew for their next two ventures: Eureka restaurant in West Los Angeles and Granita restaurant in Malibu. Huppin has participated in the opening of nearly a dozen restaurants.

== Awards ==
- Fellow, Culinary Institute of America, 2011
- Ambassador, Culinary Institute of America, 2010
- Hannah Solomon Business Woman-of-the-Year from the National Council of Jewish Women, 2003
- Share Our Strength Sponsorship Award - 2000
- Chicago Manufacturing Center Excellence Award - 1996
- Business of the Year award Chicago Mercantile Mart—1994
