= Les Dames d'Escoffier =

Les Dames d'Escoffier is an international society of professional women involved in the food, fine beverage, and hospitality industries.

== History ==
Les Dames d'Escoffier was founded in New York City in 1976, by food writer Carol Brock, in honor of Auguste Escoffier, whom Les Dames' mission statement credits with having "single-handedly brought the culinary art into the modern era". Escoffier "elevated the role of cooks from that of laborers to artists"; when he died, he "left the world a new art, that of dining". With expansion to other cities, Les Dames d'Escoffier International (LDEI) was formed in 1985 to operate as an umbrella organization. Membership is open to women who have distinguished themselves in the respective fields with which Les Dames is concerned. The female society is a response to the all-male Les Amis d'Escoffier society.

== Events ==
Les Dames organizes various food-related activities throughout the year, the majority of which are dinners; new members are inducted during the "annual gala dinners". Les Dames' major philanthropic activity consists of promoting the education and advancement of women in careers related to food industries. The society provides scholarships for women desiring to become professionals or to advance their skills in the fields of food, wine, other beverages, nutrition, the arts of the table and related disciplines.

== Notable members, awardees and scholarship recipients ==
- Jean Anderson
- Cassandra Anderton
- Charleen Badman
- Jean Banchet
- Tiffanie Barriere
- Lidia Bastianich
- Najmieh Batmanglij
- Carol Brock
- Irena Chalmers
- Julia Child
- Grace Zia Chu
- Lauren Braun Costello
- Marion Cunningham
- Carmen Ramírez Degollado
- Jenny Dorsey
- Rose Ann Finkel
- Cheryl Forberg
- Rozanne Gold
- Darra Goldstein
- Aliza Green
- Carla Hall
- Zach Hanle
- Ethel G. Hofman
- Tanya Holland
- Rochelle Huppin
- Pati Jinich
- Alma Lach
- Ris Lacoste
- Paula Lambert
- Denise Landis
- Katie Lee
- Edna Lewis
- Marie LeNôtre
- Rachel Levin
- Eileen Yin-Fei Lo
- Adena Williams Loston
- Angela Malik
- Tanya Bastianich Manuali
- Sara Moulton
- Jonell Nash
- Joan Nathan
- Marion Nestle
- Nora Pouillon
- Thelma Pressman
- Deborah VanTrece
- Dominica Rice-Cisneros
- Colleen Taylor Sen
- Jeanne Voltz
- Anne Willan
