= Sara Moulton =

American chef

- Born: February 19, 1952 (age 74); New York City, U.S.
- Education: • University of Michigan (1981) • Culinary Institute of America (1977)
- Occupations: cookbook author, television personality
- Spouse: Bill Adler
- Children: 2
- Culinary career
- Television shows
- Cooking Live; Cooking Live Primetime; Sara's Secrets; Sara's Weeknight Meals
- Website: saramoulton.com

Sara Moulton (born February 19, 1952) is an American cookbook author and television personality. In an article for The New York Times, Kim Severson described Moulton as "one of the nation’s most enduring recipe writers and cooking teachers...and a dean of food television and magazines".

Moulton was the on-air food editor for Good Morning America, a morning news-and-talk show broadcast on the ABC television network, from 1997 through 2012. She was the chef of the executive dining room at Gourmet for 20 years, a stint that ended when the magazine ceased publication in 2009.

Between 1996 and 2005, Moulton hosted Cooking Live (1996–2002), Cooking Live Primetime (1999), and Sara's Secrets (2002–2005) on the Food Network, becoming one of the original stars of that cable-and-satellite-television channel during its first decade. Her career in television and cooking has spanned nearly 40 years.

Moulton is the author of several cookbooks and videos, notably Sara Moulton Cooks at Home (2002), Sara's Secrets for Weeknight Meals (2005), and Sara Moulton's Everyday Family Dinners (2010).

In 1982, Moulton co-founded the New York Women's Culinary Alliance.

Since 2008, Moulton has been the host of Sara's Weeknight Meals, a cooking show distributed by American Public Television. From August 2012 through October 2018, Moulton was the author of a weekly cooking column for the Associated Press.

In October 2016, Moulton joined Christopher Kimball's Milk Street Radio, a weekly show broadcast by National Public Radio, as a cohost.

== Early life and education ==
Moulton was born in New York City, and attended The Brearley School in New York City. The idea of channeling her childhood passion for food into a career did not occur to Moulton until after she graduated from the University of Michigan in Ann Arbor, Michigan, with a major in the history of ideas. (Note: Originally admitted to the Class of ’74, she did not apply for, and receive, a diploma until 1981.)

Moulton enrolled at the Culinary Institute of America in Hyde Park, New York, in 1975 and graduated with highest honors in 1977, winning a scholarship from Les Dames d'Escoffier in the process. In October 2025, Moulton was among the founding roster of CIA grads honored on the school's new Walk of Fame.

== Career ==
Her first restaurant job was as an intern under Chef Lydia Shire at the Harvest Restaurant in Cambridge, MA during the summer of 1976. After graduating from the CIA in the spring of 1977, Moulton returned to the Harvest as its sous chef, a job she held for nine months. In 1979, at the suggestion of Julia Child, Moulton undertook a postgraduate apprenticeship with Master Chef Maurice Cazalis of the Henri IV Restaurant in Chartres, France. From 1979 till 1981, she was the chef at Cybele's, a Boston restaurant.

After moving to New York in 1981, Moulton was hired as the chef tournant at La Tulipe, a three-star restaurant.

In the interest of starting a family, she left restaurant work and began devoting herself instead to recipe testing and development. Moulton worked for two years as an instructor at Peter Kump's New York Cooking School (now known as the Institute of Culinary Education), where she discovered her love of teaching.

In 1984, she took a job in the test kitchen at Gourmet. Four years later she became chef of the magazine's executive dining room.

=== Television ===
In 1979, Moulton's television career began when she was hired to work behind the scenes on Julia Child & More Company, a cooking program on PBS. Her friendship with Ms. Child led eventually to Moulton's job at Good Morning America, where what started as another behind-the-scenes position ripened in 1997 into on-camera work.

By then, she had begun hosting the Food Network's Cooking Live. Six years and over 1,200 hour-long shows later, that show ended on March 31, 2002. Sara's Secrets, which began the next day, ran until 2007. “Sara Moulton is a chef, and one of the few people knowledgeable enough to field live phone-in queries, the basis of her show", wrote The New Yorker's Bill Buford. Cooking Live was nominated as the James Beard Awards' Best National Television Cooking Show in 1999 and 2000.

The fifteenth season of "Sara's Weeknight Meals" began airing on American Public Television in October 2026. The show was nominated for a James Beard Award in 2013 and 2015, while Moulton herself has been nominated three times as Outstanding Personality/Host, most recently in 2014.

=== Cookbooks and cooking columns ===
Her first cookbook, Sara Moulton Cooks at Home, was published by Broadway Books in October 2002, "While rooted in classic French technique, the book also accommodates the American hunger for convenience, novelty and freshness", wrote Mike Dunne for The Sacramento Bee.

Moulton's second cookbook, Sara's Secrets for Weeknight Meals, was published by Broadway Books in October 2005. It was reviewed by Michelle Green in People magazine, who wrote: "Sara has a gift for creating quick, accessible fine cuisine. Why suffer to make a gorgeous meal?"

Her third cookbook, Sara Moulton's Everyday Family Dinners, was published by Simon & Schuster in April 2010. Blogging for StoveTop Readings in November 2010, Greg Mowery wrote: "If there is a less pretentious, more accessible, and creative cookbook that gets great food on the table in good time with the least amount of fuss, I haven't seen it this year….This new book belongs in every family kitchen."

Moulton's fourth cookbook, Home Cooking 101: How to Make Everything Taste Better, was published by Oxmoor House in March 2016. Diana K. Rice, in The Huffington Post, described it as "extremely useful to the home cook. [Looks] like a textbook, albeit...with fabulous food photos and enticing recipes."

In August 2012, Moulton began writing a weekly column entitled "The Healthy Plate" for the Associated Press. In January 2015, she replaced it with a new column called "KitchenWise," which ran through October 2018. Between November 2016 and September 2018, Moulton contributed a monthly column called "Sunday Supper" to The Washington Post Magazine. From January 2018 through June 2021, Moulton contributed a quarterly column entitled "Maize Graze" to the University of Michigan's Alumnus Magazine.

== Awards ==
- 2001 Culinary Institute of America's Chef of the Year.
- 2002 inducted into the James Beard Foundation's Who's Who of Food and Beverage in America.
- 2011 Sara Moulton's Everyday Family Dinners was an International Association of Culinary Professionals Cookbook Awards Winner in the category of Children, Youth and Family.
- The International Restaurant & Foodservice Show of New York & Ferdinand Metz Foodservice Forum 2016 Beacon Award.
- 2018 Culinary Institute of America Leadership Award.

== Personal life ==
Moulton's husband is Bill Adler, an American music journalist and critic. They have two children. Moulton and her family live in New York City, New York.

== Bibliography ==
- Moulton, Sara; Anderson, Jean (2000). The Good Morning America Cut the Calories Cookbook – 120 Delicious Low-Fat, Low-Calorie Recipes from Our Viewers. Hyperion Books (New York City);ISBN 978-0-7868-6163-7.
- Moulton, Sara; Pierce, Charles (2002). Sara Moulton Cooks at Home. Broadway Books (New York City); ISBN 978-0-7679-0770-5.
- Moulton, Sara; Hayes, Joanne Lamb (2005). Sara's Secrets for Weeknight Meals. Broadway Books (New York City); ISBN 978-0-7679-1659-2.
- Moulton, Sara (2010). Sara Moulton's Everyday Family Dinners. Simon & Schuster (New York City). ISBN 1-4391-0251-1.
- Moulton, Sara (2016). Home Cooking 101: How to Make Everything Taste Better. Oxmoor House; ISBN 978-0848744410.

== Videography ==
- Moulton, Sara; Food and Beverage Institute (Culinary Institute of America); Culinary Institute of America (1999?). Great Chefs Series with Sara Moulton. Food and Beverage Institute (Hyde Park, New York). ISBN 978-1-58315-195-2 (VHS format).
- Moulton, Sara; Hallquist, Gary; Prime Time Video Productions; Johnson & Wales University (2000). Chef Sara Moulton. Prime Time Video Productions (Providence, Rhode Island). OCLC 54841683 (VHS format).
- Moulton, Sara; Flay, Bobby; Deen, Paula H.; Ray, Rachael; Food Network. (2003). Cooking from the Grill. Food Network (New York City). OCLC 156995722 (DVD format).
- Moulton, Sara; Food Network (2004). Sara's Secrets with Sara Moulton – Celebrating the Holidays. Food Network (New York City). OCLC 62411039 (DVD format).
- Moulton, Sara; Food Network (2004). Sara's Secrets with Sara Moulton – Effortless Entertaining Food Network (New York City). OCLC 62411686 (DVD format).
- Moulton, Sara; Food Network (2006). Sara's Secrets with Sara Moulton – Celebrating the Holidays. Food Network (New York City). OCLC 173282680 (DVD format). (reissue, with additional material, of 2004 release)
- Garten, Ina; Moulton, Sara; Deen, Paula H.; Food Network (2006). Holiday Best, 2006. Food Network (New York City). OCLC 181746062 (DVD format).

== See also ==
- List of American writers
- List of chefs
- List of Michigan writers
- List of non-fiction writers
- List of people from New York City
- List of television presenters
- List of University of Michigan alumni
