= Sara's Secrets =

- Genre: Cooking
- Presented by: Sara Moulton
- Country of origin: United States
- Original language: English
- No. of seasons: 5
- No. of episodes: 361

Original release
- Network: Food Network; Food Network Canada

Sara's Secrets was a Food Network show hosted by Sara Moulton who was the executive chef of Gourmet magazine. Sara’s Secrets aired from 2002 until 2007. Sara's Secrets offers the viewer recipes and techniques specifically focused to fit the viewer's busy lifestyle.

From time to time, guest chefs, cookbook authors, and food specialists from around the world drop by. Invited guests give the viewer insider secrets, tips, tricks, techniques that professionals use to save time and money.

Sara Moulton shows the viewer how to make the best meals possible by keeping it simple with a limited amount of fuss, but also with good flavor.

== Episode list ==
=== Season 1 ===
- HCSP03 Sara's Thanksgiving Secrets
- SS1A01 Tricks for the Pastry Impaired
- SS1A02 The Perfect Salad
- SS1A03 Dinner Party of Miniatures
- SS1A04 Dinner For Two
- SS1A05 Tantalizing Tarts
- SS1A06 Two Birthday Parties
- SS1A07 Complete Make-Ahead Brunch
- SS1A08 Trompe L'Oeil Food Gifts
- SS1A09 Do You Fondue?
- SS1A10 Sunday Night Supper
- SS1A11 Food As Fashion
- SS1A12 Low Fat Fooled Ya
- SS1A13 Cinderella Dishes
- SS1A14 Unexpected Guests
- SS1A15 One Cake Fits All
- SS1A16 A Special Occasion Dinner
- SS1A17 Surprise Holiday Guests
- SS1A18 Food and Wine Tasting
- SS1A19 Pizza Party
- SS1A20 Come For Drinks, Stay For Dinner
- SS1A21 Thanksgiving Primer
- SS1A22 Open House
- SS1A23 Mediterranean Magic
- SS1A24 Wrap Magic
- SS1A25 Budget Gourmet
- SS1A26 Some Assembly Required
- SS1B01 Always On Hand
- SS1B02 Feasts From the Fridge
- SS1B03 Feasts From the Freezer
- SS1B04 Double Duty
- SS1B05 Breakfast for Dinner
- SS1B06 Frozen Dinners
- SS1B07 Sandwich Sensations
- SS1B08 Soup as Supper
- SS1B09 Shortcuts to Success
- SS1B10 Cooking For One
- SS1B11 Better Burgers
- SS1B12 One Pot Meals
- SS1B13 Fast and Fabulous Fish
- SS1B14 Secrets to Simple Sautes
- SS1B15 Slow Cooking
- SS1B16 Blue Plate Specials
- SS1B18 Taters, Taters, Taters
- SS1B19 Getting Organized
- SS1B20 Pot Pies
- SS1B21 A New Way to Cook
- SS1B22 Quick and Easy Sides
- SS1B23 Grill Pan
- SS1B24 Everyday Vegetarian
- SS1B25 Easy Desserts
- SS1B26 Quick Pasta Sauces
- SS1B27 Rice for Supper
- SS1B28 Paella Fiesta
- SS1B29 The Mold Makes It
- SS1B30 Main Course Salads
- SS1B31 Bistro Dinner
- SS1B32 Mexican Night
- SS1B33 Seafood Sandwiches
- SS1B34 Corn Every Way
- SS1B35 Pounding Out Dinner
- SS1B36 Dinner at the Beach
- SS1B37 No-Fail Fish
- SS1B38 Exotic Dinner
- SS1B39 Five Ingredient Wonders
- SS1B40 Casual Entertaining
- SS1B41 One Pot Meal
- SS1B42 Packed With Flavor
- SS1B43 Sweet Endings
- SS1B44 Mediterranean Mezze Table
- SS1B45 Quick and Tasty Chicken
- SS1B46 Wok this Way
- SS1B47 Lemons Every Way
- SS1B48 Appetizing Dinner
- SS1B49 Real Simple
- SS1B50 Here's the Beef
- SS1B51 Lasagna Three Ways
- SS1B52 Eat Your Vegetables
- SS1B53 All About Cheese
- SS1B54 Quick Breads
- SS1B55 Celebrations
- SS1B56 Quick Sauces
- SS1B57 Crazy About Couscous
- SS1B58 Romantic Sailboat Picnic
- SS1B60 Skewer It!
- SS1B61 Three Dinners in One
- SS1B68 Midsummer Swedish Buffet
- SS1B71 Dinner in Twenty Minutes
- SS1B72 Warm Weather Soups
- SS1B73 Berry Best
- SS1B74 Celebrating Tomatoes
- SS1B75 Terrace Lunch
- SS1B79 Tempting Tarts
- SS1B80 Gadgets Galore
- SS1B81 Perfecting Vinaigrette
- SS1B82 All Fired Up
- SS1B84 Fisherman's Catch
- SS1B86 Quick and Easy Pasta
- SS1B87 Basics of Herbs
- SS1C30 California Cooking

=== Season 2 ===
- SS1B17 Five Ingredient Wonders
- SS1B59 Dinner en Surprise
- SS1B62 Five Ingredient Wonders
- SS1B63 Double Duty
- SS1B64 Chicken Three Ways
- SS1B65 Elegant Soiree
- SS1B66 Portuguese Dinner
- SS1B67 Retro Cocktail Party
- SS1B69 Four Star Home Entertaining
- SS1B70 Four Star Dessert Party
- SS1B76 Impromptu Dinner Party
- SS1B77 Feelin' Good
- SS1B78 All About Cheesecakes
- SS1B83 Sunday Dinner with Aunt Fannie
- SS1B85 Weeknight Warriors
- SS1B88 All About Lilies

=== Season 3 ===
- SS1C01 One Dish Wonders
- SS1C02 Cold Weather Soups
- SS1C03 Cooking Ahead
- SS1C04 Savory Pies
- SS1C05 All About Chicken
- SS1C06 Holiday Cake
- SS1C07 Sunday Pot Roast
- SS1C08 Cooking for One
- SS1C09 Cooking in a Shoebox
- SS1C10 Gadgets Galore: Food Processor
- SS1C11 Taqueria Night
- SS1C12 All-American Breakfast
- SS1C13 Five Ingredients or Less
- SS1C14 Just Say Cheese
- SS1C15 International Sandwiches
- SS1C16 All About Peanut Butter
- SS1C17 Pot Luck
- SS1C18 Everyday Chinese
- SS1C19 Melting Pot Meals
- SS1C20 Quick and Easy Breads
- SS1C21 Eating Right
- SS1C22 Market Basket
- SS1C23 Chef Cooks at Home
- SS1C24 Chocolate Desserts
- SS1C25 East Indian Dinner
- SS1C26 Cooking for a Crowd
- SS1C27 Dim Sum Party
- SS1C28 Pacific Northwest Thanksgiving
- SS1C29 Dinner With Friends
- SS1C31 Halloween Party
- SS1C32 Everyday Caribbean
- SS1C33 Cooking With Kids
- SS1C34 Hors d'oeuvre Party
- SS1C35 All About Chilies
- SS1C36 Simple Seafood
- SS1C37 Championship Chili
- SS1C38 Spectacular Serving
- SS1C39 Fireside Dinner
- SS1C40 French Sunday Lunch
- SS1C41 One Pot Wonders: Boeuf a la Bourguignonne
- SS1C42 Everyday Asian
- SS1C43 Perfect Pairings
- SS1C44 Entertaining On a Shoestring
- SS1C45 Fiesta Latino
- SS1C46 Meatless Meals
- SS1C47 All About Turkey
- SS1C48 Pot Luck
- SS1C49 Super Sauces
- SS1C50 Spring Celebration
- SS1C51 Effortless Entertaining
- SS1C52 Chefs Cook at Home
- SS1C53 International Breakfast
- SS1C54 Greek Easter
- SS1C55 Spring Sides
- SS1C56 Slimmed Down Classics
- SS1C57 Double Duty
- SS1C58 Gadgets Galore - Toaster Oven
- SS1C59 Simple Sautes
- SS1C60 Spectacular Serving
- SS1C61 Five Ingredients or Less
- SS1C62 Old Fashioned Desserts
- SS1C63 All About Dried Herbs
- SS1C64 Steakhouse Dinner
- SS1C65 Cooking for One
- SS1C66 International Noodles
- SS1C67 Weekday Wraps
- SS1C68 Simple Soups
- SS1C69 You Can Please Everyone
- SS1C70 Meal Makeovers
- SS1C71 All About Avocadoes and Pineapples
- SS1C72 Shortcut Suppers

=== Season 3 ===
- SS1D01 Poach it!
- SS1D02 Heat Beater Sauces
- SS1D03 Grilled Sandwiches
- SS1D04 You Can Please Everyone - Vegetarian and Carnivore
- SS1D05 Chefs Cook at Home
- SS1D06 Burger Basics
- SS1D07 Berry Best
- SS1D08 Chicken Salads
- SS1D09 Global Noodles
- SS1D10 Farm Fresh
- SS1D11 Sara's Favorite Restaurant Dishes
- SS1D12 Everyday Mexican
- S1D13 Gadgets Galore: Ice Cream Parlor Treats
- S1D14 More Meatless Meals
- S1D15 Beer Tasting
- S1D16 Everyday Italian
- S1D17 Sensational Sides
- S1D18 Simply Shaker
- S1D19 Effortless Entertaining
- S1D20 Five Ingredients or Less
- S1D21 Slimmed Down Classics
- S1D22 Girls at the Grill
- S1D23 Pot Luck Contest
- S1D24 Founder's Feast
- S1D25 Wedding Rehearsal Dinner
- S1D26 Cakeman Raven
- S1D27 Shortcut Supper
- S1D28 Country Brunch
- SS1D29 DIY Dinners
- SS1D30 Al Fresco Favorites
- SS1D31 Nuevo Latino
- SS1D32 New World Cuisine
- SS1D33 Effortless Entertaining: Cocktail Party
- SS1D34 Singapore Sensations
- SS1D35 All Hallows Bash
- SS1D36 All Star Entertaining
- SS1D37 Midnight Buffet
- SS1D38 Supper in Seconds
- SS1D39 Slimmed Down Classics
- SS1D40 All About Russet Potatoes
- SS1D41 New England Classics
- SS1D42 Eye on Pie
- SS1D43 Meatless Meals
- SS1D44 Five Ingredients or Less
- SS1D45 Five Ingredients or Less
- SS1D46 Low Country Cooking
- SS1D47 Harvest Dinner: Thanksgiving
- SS1D48 American Wine and Cheese Party
- SS1D49 Country Classics
- SS1D50 Chefs Cook at Home
- SS1D51 Festival of Lights: Hannukah
- SS1D52 Holiday Breads
- SS1D53 Budget Gourmet: Chicken
- SS1D54 Quick Pickling
- SS1D55 Turkey Day Transformations
- SS1D56 Shortcut Suppers
- SS1D57 All About Vanilla
- SS1D58 Guilt-free Gourmet
- SS1D59 All About Maple Syrup
- SS1D60 A Menu of Memories
- SS1D61 Retro Desserts
- SS1D62 Holiday Cookies
- SS1D63 Moroccan Dinner
- SS1D64 Spectacular Serving
- SS1D65 Favorite Thanksgiving Sides
- SS1D66 Family Favorites
- SS1D67 Fisherman's Catch
- SS1D68 Cooking for One
- SS1D69 Nuts for Peanuts
- SS1D70 Slimmed Down Classics
- SS1D71 Memorable Meals
- SS1D72 Spice It Up!
- SS1D73 Tastes of Greece
- SS1D74 Bread Basics
- SS1D75 Late Night Sandwiches
- SS1D76 Everyday Jamaican
- SS1D77 Short-Order Secrets
- SS1D78 Meatless Meals
- SS1D79 Soup for Supper
- SS1D80 Gaelic Grub
- SS1D81 Budget Gourmet:Grind It Up!
- SS1D82 Dinner in a Dash
- SS1D83 Spectacular Serving
- SS1D84 You Asked For It!
- SS1D85 Cook Today, Serve Tomorrow
- SS1D86 Romantic Rendezvous
- SS1D87 Effortless Entertaining: Super Bowl Party
- SS1D88 California Cookin'
- SS1D89 Caribbean Cookin'
- SS1D90 Tricks of the Trade
- SS1D91 Melting Pot
- SS1D92 Amazing Grains
- SS1D93 Pasta Pronto

=== Season 4 ===
- SS1E01 Stylish Sandwiches
- SS1E02 Effortless Entertaining
- SS1E03 Chef Cooks at Home
- SS1E04 Mother's Day Brunch
- SS1E05 Fresh and Healthy
- SS1E06 Five Ingredients or Less
- SS1E07 Spectacular Serving
- SS1E08 Cookie Class
- SS1E09 American Bistro
- SS1E10 Salads for Supper
- SS1E11 Food To Go
- SS1E12 International Pancakes
- SS1E13 Russian Easter
- SS1E14 Shortcut Suppers: Rotisserie Chicken
- SS1E15 Bridal Buffet
- SS1E16 Butcher's Basics
- SS1E17 Hot and Spicy
- SS1E18 Arthur Avenue
- SS1E19 Coffee Cookin'
- SS1E20 Frozen Treats
- SS1E21 Cab Fare
- SS1E22 Double Duty
- SS1E23 Simple Sautes
- SS1E24 The Wok
- SS1E25 Budget Gourmet
- SS1E26 One Dish Meals
- SS1E27 Foolproof Dishes
- SS1E28 Small Plates
- SS1E29 Five Ingredients or Less
- SS1E30 Simple Soups
- SS1E31 Cooking With Kids
- SS1E32 Old South BBQ
- SS1E33 Chef Cooks at Home
- SS1E34 Healthy Pleasures
- SS1E35 Dinner and a Movie
- SS1E36 Low Carb, High Flavor
- SS1E37 Gone Fishin'
- SS1E38 Recipe for Romance
- SS1E39 Effortless Entertaining
- SS1E40 Lunchtime Luxury
- SS1E41 Heritage Brunch
- SS1E42 Nothing's Taboo
- SS1E43 Portuguese Dinner
- SS1E44 American Sandwiches
- SS1E45 Eating Well
- SS1E46 Smokin'
- SS1E47 Spectacular Serving
- SS1E48 Dinner to a Tea
- SS1E49 Wing It!
- SS1E50 Chesapeake Dinner
- SS1E51 Everyday French
- SS1E52 The Cutting Edge
- SS1E53 A Day at Gourmet
- SS1E54 Family Favorites

=== Season 5 ===
- SS1301 International Chicken
- SS1302 Breakfast for Dinner
- SS1303 5 Ingredients or Less
- SS1304 Sandwiches for Supper
- SS1305 Weeknight Treats
- SS1306 All About Paprika
- SS1307 Cook like a Chef
- SS1308 Basic Braising
- SS1309 Soup Starters
- SS1310 Blueberry Basics
- SS1311 Totally Tomatoes
- SS1312 Egg Whites 101
- SS1313 Sunday Dinner
- SS1314 Nigerian Dinner
- SS1315 Kitchen Improv
- SS1316 Cupcakes
- SS1317 Gourmet Dinners
- SS1318 Weekend Breakfast
- SS1319 Farm to Table
- SS1320 Everyday Colombian
- SS1321 Everyday Chinese
- SS1322 Latino Shortcuts
- SS1323 Dinner and Movie
- SS1324 Loafin'It
- SS1325 American Icons
- SS1326 All About Pork
- SS1327 B.Casual
