= Rachel Levin =

Rachel Levin may refer to:

- Rachel Levin (author), journalist and novelist
- Rachel Levin (influencer), American YouTuber and beauty guru

== See also ==
- Rahel Varnhagen (1771–1833), also known as Rahel Levin, German writer and salonniere
- Rachel Levine (born 1957), pediatrician
