= Food Fighters (TV series) =

- Genre: Reality competition; Cookery
- Created by: Tim Puntillo
- Directed by: Ivan Dudynsky
- Presented by: Adam Richman
- Country of origin: United States
- Original language: English
- No. of seasons: 2
- No. of episodes: 18

Production
- Executive producers: Ben Silverman; Tim Puntillo; Chris Grant; Jimmy Fox (season 1); Laura Caraccioli (season 2)
- Production location: Los Angeles, California
- Running time: 42 minutes
- Production companies: Rio Bravo; Electus; Universal Television

Original release
- Network: NBC
- Release: July 22, 2014 – September 3, 2015

Food Fighters is an American reality based cooking television series hosted by Adam Richman that pits a home chef against five professional chefs in a series of cooking competitions for a chance to win up to $100,000. The series premiered July 22, 2014 on NBC as a summer replacement series. On January 21, 2015, NBC renewed the show for a second season. The second season premiered July 2, 2015 and concluded September 3, 2015. In season one, new episodes aired every Tuesday at 8 p.m. ET, while in season two new episodes aired every Thursday at 8 p.m. ET.

== Format ==
Food Fighters bills itself as "one part cooking competition, one part game show." In each episode, a contestant who is a home-based amateur cook comes to the show with a list of five of their best recipes to prepare on the show. The show is divided into five rounds, one round for each recipe. In each round, a mystery professional chef comes in to challenge the contestant. The chefs are represented as black silhouettes of themselves on a large video screen and on a graphic to the home viewer before being shown. Once the chef is introduced, the contestant chooses one of their recipes to cook against the professional, and they cannot prepare a recipe more than once. The contestant generally attempts to select a recipe that is not in the known style of the chef, as the chef does not know in advance what dish they will be cooking. After a set cooking time (generally varying from 15–25 minutes), the contestant's and the chef's respective recipes are judged by a group of five ordinary food-loving people known as the "Dinner Party" in a blind taste test, who discuss positive and negative aspects of each dish. A majority vote of the Dinner Party determines the winner of the round. Each round that the contestant wins earns them a cash prize. The first round is worth $5,000, the second round is worth $10,000, the third round is worth $15,000, the fourth round is worth $20,000, and the fifth round is worth double the amount of the contestant's previous winnings, making a top possible prize of $100,000. If the chef wins a round, the contestant does not win any money for that round but continues through the entire show. If the contestant does not win any round prior to the final round, that final round will be worth $10,000.

The fifth professional chef that competes is generally a celebrity chef that has frequently appeared on other cooking shows, especially those on Food Network, including Cat Cora, Elizabeth Falkner, Duff Goldman, Lorena Garcia, Jet Tila, and Gerry Garvin. The set of the show is unique from other cooking shows in that it is a two-story set, with the contestant cooking in a kitchen upstairs on an upper level while the chef cooks in a similar kitchen on the lower level. The show also publishes the contestant recipes on their website.

== Episodes ==
=== Season 1 (2014) ===
==== S1E1: Elisha Joyce ====
Professional Chefs	Kevin Belton	Jonny Giordani	Michele Ragussis	Marcel Vigneron	Lorena Garcia	Total Winnings
Contestant Dishes	Egg Rolls	Fish Tacos	Mango Tart	Stewed Chicken & Rice	Salmon & Quinoa	$60,000

==== S1E2: Kena Peay ====
Professional Chefs	Chad Ward	Daniel Shemtob	Deborah Benaim	Stefan Richter	Cat Cora	Total Winnings
Contestant Dishes	Tomato Soup & Grilled Cheese	Milk & Cookies	Spring Rolls	Shrimp Po'boy	Pan-seared Pork	$100,000

==== S1E3: Annie Smith ====
Professional Chefs	Kent Rollins	Manouschka Guerrier	Sharone Hakman	Antonia Lofaso	Gerry "G" Garvin	Total Winnings
Contestant Dishes	Raspberry Soufflé	Chicken Pot Pie	Chicken Fettucine Alfredo	Sweet & Spicy Shrimp	Seared Ahi Tuna	$90,000

NOTE: In addition to the cash, Annie Smith was given a Tobii eye tracking speech recognition device for her disabled daughter.

==== S1E4: Nick Evans ====
Professional Chefs	Kent Rollins	Elise Wims	Vic Vegas	Casey Thompson	Duff Goldman	Total Winnings
Contestant Dishes	Chorizo Tacos	Chicken Wings & Dipping Sauce	Mashed Potato Pizza	Veggie Burger & Chips	Eggs Benedict	$70,000

==== S1E5: Cortney Anderson-Sanford ====
Professional Chefs	Hop Phan	Sarah Simington	Stuart O'Keefe	Eric Greenspan	Lorena Garcia	Total Winnings
Contestant Dishes	French Toast w/ Fruit	Asian Salmon	Chocolate Tart	Lobster with Stuffing	Biscuits & Gravy	$100,000

==== S1E6: Jon Coombs ====
Professional Chefs	Daniel Shemtob	Devin Alexander	Vic Vegas	Eric Greenspan	Cat Cora	Total Winnings
Contestant Dishes	Scallops & Potatoes	Macaroni & Cheese	Caribbean Chicken	Cookie Sandwich	Shrimp & Grits	$70,000

==== S1E7: Melissa Clinton ====
Professional Chefs	Josh Stone	Manouschka Guerrier	Michele Ragussis	Mike Brown	Jet Tila	Total Winnings
Contestant Dishes	Stuffed Chicken w/ Mashed Potatoes	Meatballs w/ Ratatouille	Pork Wellington	Chicken Burger & Onion Rings	Bacon Brownies	$50,000

==== S1E8: Jim Stark ====
Professional Chefs	Josh Stone	Yaku Moton-Spruill	Deborah Benaim	Marcel Vigneron	Elizabeth Falkner	Total Winnings
Contestant Dishes	Fried Catfish	Chocolate Cake	Steak w/ Mushroom Sauce	Baby Back Ribs	Cheesy Polenta	$70,000

=== Season 2 (2015) ===
==== S2E1: "I'm Bringing the Spice" — Jacky Herrera ====
Professional Chefs	Ray Lampe	Daniel Shemtob	Stuart O'Keefe	Danielle Saunders	Antonia Lofaso	Total Winnings
Contestant Dishes	Cheese Enchiladas	Beef Empanadas	Pan-fried Salmon	Spicy Meatballs	Berry Sponge Cake	$50,000

==== S2E2: "You're in the Big Leagues Now" — Holly Haines ====
Professional Chefs	Alejandra Schrader	Daniel Shemtob	Michele Ragussis	Tiffany Derry	Eric Greenspan	Total Winnings
Contestant Dishes	Chicken & Waffles	Catfish & Hushpuppies	Steak Lettuce Wrap w/ Chimichurri	Chocolate Cake w/ Strawberries	Shrimp & Grits	$45,000

==== S2E3: "This Kid's Got Moves" — Troy Glass ====
Professional Chefs	Hop Phan	Connie "Lovely" Jackson	Chris Nirschel	Keriann Von Raesfeld	Rocco DiSpirito	Total Winnings
Contestant Dishes	Mac & Cheese	Chicken Tacos w/ Fresh Tortillas	Banana Bread & Ice Cream	Hamburger & Fries	Fresh Pappardelle w/ Tuna	$20,000

NOTE: In addition to the cash, 14-year-old Troy Glass was given a full two-year scholarship to The Culinary Institute of America.

==== S2E4: "This Cheerleader's Got Game" — Amber MacDonald ====
Professional Chefs	Shariff Herndon	Sarah Simington	Viet Pham	Brendan Collins	Nadia G.	Total Winnings
Contestant Dishes	Chicken & Wine Sauce	Shrimp Scampi	S'mores	Spaghetti & Meatballs	Sausage & Peppers Sandwich	$70,000

==== S2E5: "Fighting Fire with Food" — Ryan McKay ====
Professional Chefs	Dave Mueller	Kai Kani	Jamika Pessoa	Brad Miller	Lorena Garcia	Total Winnings
Contestant Dishes	Spicy Chicken Wings	Chicken Enchiladas	Crepes Suzette	Southern Breakfast Biscuit	Shepherd's Pie	$50,000

==== S2E6: "Fear My Skills, and My Heels" — Alyssia Birnbaum ====
Professional Chefs	Ronnie Woo	Manouschka Guerrier	Michele Ragussis	Katsuji Tanabe	Brian Malarkey	Total Winnings
Contestant Dishes	Walnut Brownies	Pasta w/ Mushroom Sauce	Fried Chicken Sandwich	Butternut Squash Ravioli	Fried Mahi Mahi w/ Sauce	$35,000

==== S2E7: "The Lawyer Raises the Bar" — Zac Delap ====
Professional Chefs	Deborah VanTrece	Sarah Simington	Sharone Hakman	Chris Oh	Fabio Viviani	Total Winnings
Contestant Dishes	Pad Thai	Chicken Tikka Masala	Chili & Cornbread	Cookies & Ice Cream	Asian Pork Sandwich	$60,000

==== S2E8: "Whiz Kid in the Kitchen" — Danielle McNerney ====
Professional Chefs	Deborah VanTrece	Alex Williams	Jamika Pessoa	Katsuji Tanabe	Duff Goldman	Total Winnings
Contestant Dishes	Scallops & Cauliflower	Pork Chops & Apples	Pasta w/ Cream Sauce	Chicken Roulade	Steak Tostada w/ Salsa	$0

NOTE: When the contestant lost the first four rounds, it was announced that the last match would be for $10,000.
12-year-old Danielle McNerney was given a trip to science camp from Education Unlimited and Sally Ride Science held at Stanford University, and Walmart gave $20,000 to help with her mother's charity.

==== S2E9: "Home Cook Heavyweight" — Will Spencer ====
Professional Chefs	Alejandra Schrader	Connie "Lovely" Jackson	Kayne Raymond	Keriann Von Raesfeld	Aaron McCargo, Jr.	Total Winnings
Contestant Dishes	Chicken & Waffles	Steak & Plantains	Shrimp & Grits	Crab Cakes w/ Remoulade	Chicken Curry w/ Rice	$35,000

==== S2E10: "This Soccer Mom Sizzles" — Alice Currah ====
Professional Chefs	Stephanie Goldfarb	Jason Febres	Deborah Benaim	Chris Oh	Marcel Vigneron	Total Winnings
Contestant Dishes	Clams & Curry Sauce	Black Cod & Broccoli	Pumpkin Pie	Chicken Wings & Slaw	Pork Fried Rice	$30,000
