= La Tulipe =

- Interactive map of La Tulipe

Restaurant information
- Established: May 1979
- Closed: February 1991
- Owners: Sally Darr, John Darr
- Head chef: Sally Darr
- Food type: Classic French cuisine; Nouvelle cuisine
- Dress code: Casual
- Location: 104 West 13th Street, Greenwich Village; New York, NY
- Coordinates: 40°44′12″N 73°59′53″W
- Seating capacity: 65
- Reservations: Required

La Tulipe was a French restaurant in Manhattan owned and run by chef Sally Darr. It was located in Greenwich Village from 1979 to 1991. The restaurant served classic French cuisine and nouvelle cuisine, and was often referred to as a bistro.

Though small and intimate, the restaurant proved influential, and after Mimi Sheraton awarded it three stars in The New York Times six weeks after it opened, it was favored by chefs such as Julia Child, James Beard, and Jacques Pépin.

== History ==
Chef Sally Darr and her husband John Darr opened La Tulipe in May 1979 in the renovated ground floor of a townhouse on West 13th Street in Greenwich Village. John Darr handled the restaurant's dining room, and was its business manager and maitre d’. The restaurant was small, with about 65 seats.

In July 1979 The New York Times rated the restaurant 3 stars, and in September 1979, in an article about nouvelle cuisine in the Times, Mimi Sheraton wrote "Several Americans who do their own versions of this French cooking are also of interest. The best is Sally Darr, who cooks at her restaurant La Tulipe, 104 West 13th Street".

In 1985 The New York Times stated "La Tulipe has maintained its high altitude over the years ... Mrs. Darr ... stays at the controls and personally prepares every dish to order. It is evident that Mrs. Darr's entrees are nearly always well-conceived; she stresses flavor over flashiness."

In December 1988, The New York Times changed its rating to 2 stars.

After 12 years of operation, the restaurant closed in February 1991. The high-flying Wall Street years of the 1980s had ended, and a recession had set in. The venue was sold to a pair of restaurateurs, Donald Evans and Lora Zarubin, who planned to open a new establishment, called Lora.

== Menu ==
La Tulipe served classic French cuisine and nouvelle cuisine.

The menu was à la carte, with five entrées on the ever-changing menu each night.

It was open from 6:30pm to 10:00pm, Tuesday through Sunday, and closed on Mondays. Reservations were required. La Tulipe also hosted private parties for up to 50 people, with a four-course dinner, open bar, and wine.

The restaurant advertised its recurring specials as "papillote de red snapper aux légumes fondants", and "langue Valenciennoise"; the former was a fillet of red snapper baked with vegetables and cream en papillote, and the latter combined smoked beef tongue with chicken‐liver mousse and foie gras de carnard, seasoned with green peppercorns.

In a retrospective, The New York Times wrote that "Ms. Darr served what is known as cooking 'à la bonne femme' — classic but simple French dishes like roast chicken with 40 cloves of garlic, as well as her own innovations, like soft shell crab meunière and an extravagant terrine of what seemed like hundreds of layers of smoked tongue and foie gras mousse." The Times added that "Desserts were Ms. Darr’s forte: She was a skilled pastry chef, and her apricot souffle, shaped like a minaret and served table-side with a dollop of whipped cream flavored with kirsch, was a best seller."

== Influence ==
After receiving three stars from Mimi Sheraton in The New York Times in July 1979, La Tulipe became popular with notables, celebrities, and celebrity chefs. The restaurant was also a precursor to the nouvelle cuisine trend in the U.S.

Julia Child quickly became a fan, and invited the Darrs to her cottage in Provence. Child coopted some of Darr's recipes, and Darr appeared on her new television show, Dinner at Julia's.

James Beard frequented the restaurant.

Jacques Pépin was periodically a guest chef at the restaurant.

Sara Moulton, who went on to be a popular cookbook author, magazine cooking journalist, and cooking-show host, was chef tournant (filling in as needed on any station in the kitchen) at La Tulipe between 1981 and 1983.
