= Sally Darr =

American chef (1923–2023)

- Born: January 18, 1923; Brooklyn, New York
- Died: November 7, 2023; New York City
- Occupation: Chef
- Known for: Chef and owner of La Tulipe

Sally Darr (January 18, 1923 – November 7, 2023) was an American chef. From 1979 to 1991, she was the chef and owner of La Tulipe, a French bistro in Greenwich Village, New York City.

== Life and work ==
Sally Kaufman was born on January 18, 1923, in Brooklyn, New York to Albert Kaufman and Yetta Goldstein Kaufman. Sally attended Brooklyn's Abraham Lincoln High School and took a job as a textile designer. In 1953 she met John Darr (died 2007), described as a minister and peace activist, and he became her second husband that same year.

Sally and John Darr hosted “peace dinners” for fellow activists which inspired Sally to become a serious cook, "working her way through every single recipe in “The Escoffier Cookbook” — there are nearly 3,000 — as she told Craig Claiborne of The Times in 1980."

Exploring her new passion, she began testing recipes for the “Foods of the World” cookbook series for Time-Life Books. In 1970, Gourmet magazine hired her and she helped create a new cookbook titled “Gourmet’s France” in 1978, which required her to collect recipes throughout France for four years.

When Sally, an "unrelentingly perfectionist," decided she wanted to run her own restaurant, she and John bought a run-down building in New York City on West 13th Street. Their French restaurant, La Tulipe, opened in May 1979, and was on the ground floor; the owners lived on the floors above it. According to Green,

"From the moment it opened in May 1979, it was a success, earning three stars from Mimi Sheraton of The New York Times, who praised its “small but enticing menu,” the “sheer perfection” of Ms. Darr’s zucchini fritters and her “immaculate” lemon tart. Desserts were Ms. Darr’s forte: She was a skilled pastry chef, and her apricot souffle, shaped like a minaret and served table-side with a dollop of whipped cream flavored with kirsch, was a best seller."

John Darr served as the host and business manager. "La Tulipe was never a moneymaker; Ms. Darr’s high standards were in opposition to high profit margins, and Mr. Darr was more of an educator than an economist."

The restaurant closed in 1991 and the couple moved to the West Village in Manhattan so Sally could cook for friends. According to Green, "At her death, her niece Dorothy Darr reported, there were 10 pounds of butter in her fridge."

== Personal life ==
Sally was briefly married to her first husband, Joseph Gross, and they had a son named Joshua, but the marriage ended in divorce. Joshua, was adopted by John Darr and died in 1985.

Sally Darr died on November 7 at her home in the West Village of New York City at the age of 100.
