= Paula Lambert =

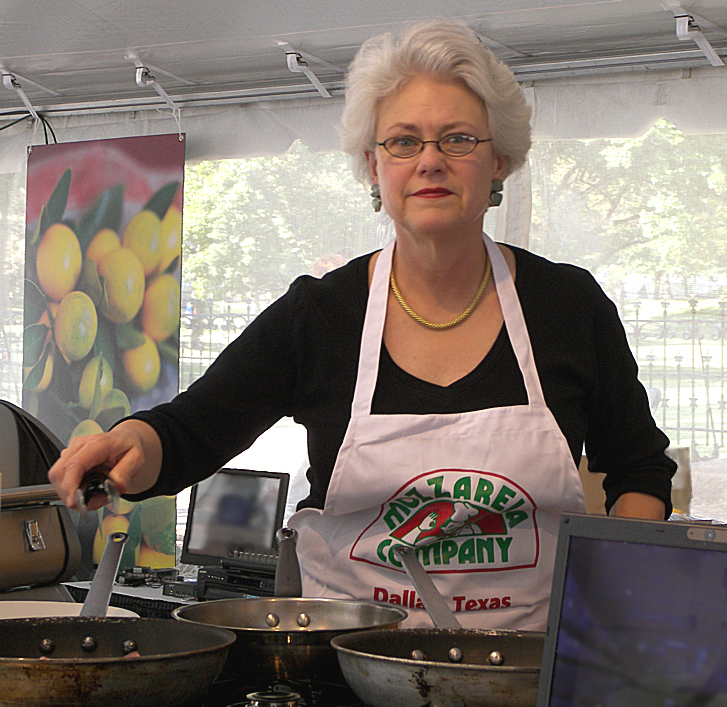
Lambert doing a cooking demonstration at the 2007 Texas Book Festival

Paula Wynne Stephens Lambert (born July 5, 1943, in Santa Maria, California) is an American artisanal cheesemaker, author and teacher. Lambert grew up in Fort Worth, Texas and spent some time as a college student in Perugia, Italy studying art history. After college, she returned to Italy to live for a time and enjoyed the fresh mozzarella available there. In 1982, she founded the Mozzarella Company in Dallas, Texas. She is the author of two books on cheese and teaches cooking classes.

== Accolades ==
Lambert was listed in Who's Who in Food and Wine in Texas in 1988 and received the Roundtable for Women in Foodservice's Pacesetter Award in 1992. In 1998, she was listed in the James Beard Foundation's Who's Who in Food and Beverage in America. In 2005, she received the Career Achievement Award from Mary Baldwin College in Staunton, Virginia. In 2022, Les Dames d'Escoffier recognized Lambert with the Grande Dame Lifetime Achievement Award for extraordinary lifetime contributions within the food, beverage and hospitality industries.

== Bibliography ==
- The Cheese Lover's Cookbook and Guide: Over 150 Recipes with Instructions on How to Buy, Store, and Serve All Your Favorite Cheeses. Simon & Schuster. 2000. ISBN 0-684-86318-9.
- Cheese, Glorious Cheese: More Than 75 Tempting Recipes for Cheese Lovers Everywhere. Simon & Schuster. 2007. ISBN 978-0-7432-7895-9.
