= Dominica Rice-Cisneros =

American chef and entrepreneur

- Born: Dominica Rice; Chinatown, Los Angeles, California, U.S.
- Culinary career
- Cooking style: Cal-Mex
- Current restaurant(s): Bombera, Oakland
- Previous restaurant(s): Cosecha, Oakland (2011–2021); Chez Panisse, Berkeley

Dominica Rice-Cisneros is an American chef and entrepreneur. She is the owner of Bombera and was owner of the now closed Cosecha, both which are located in Oakland, California.

== Early life and education ==
Dominica Rice was born in Chinatown, Los Angeles. She was raised in the Eagle Rock neighborhood of Los Angeles. Her family is of Northern Mexican heritage. Her grandparents migrated to the United States in the 19th century. Growing up in Los Angeles, her family ate a lot of Asian food, including Chinese, Vietnamese and Thai. She also helped her grandmother prepare traditional Mexican dishes.

== Career ==
Rice-Cisneros has worked professionally as a cook since the 1990s. She has worked as an intern at Daniel and in the kitchens of Restaurant Soleil, in Mexico City, and Berkeley's Chez Panisse. She lived in Mexico City for two years in her twenties. Her time in Mexico City inspired her interest in fresh, seasonal Mexican food. In 1993, she moved to Oakland, California.

In 2011, Rice-Cisneros decided to open it in Swan's Market, a historic market in downtown Oakland which, at the time, had been virtually empty and was seeking tenants to revive its market concept. She began looking for a loan for the restaurant and friends tried to talk her out of it, believing the old market was not a good investment. Her desire to open Cosecha was inspired by visiting food markets growing up in Los Angeles and while spending time in Mexico City. Swan's Market fitted her vision. The market now has Cosecha, as well a number of vendors and restaurants. At Cosecha, most of the staff are women, including mothers, many of whom can only work day shifts in order to care for their children. Her goal of supporting women is so that they "can work to let go of the unnecessary burden of feeling they need to take care of everything and everyone".

She participated in a panel at the MAD Symposium in 2016 about the challenges faced by women in the restaurant industry. She was inducted into Les Dames d'Escoffier in 2017 and, in the same year, she announced that she would open Bombera Bar & Grill in an old fire station in the Dimond District in Oakland. Construction started in 2019 and Bombera was expected to open in 2020, which was indefinitely postponed due to the COVID-19 pandemic.

Two years later, in 2019, she was nominated for the James Beard Award for Best Chef: West.

In 2021, Rice-Cisneros announced that she would close Coescha in March and open Bombera in April because of the economic impact of the COVID-19 pandemic.

In 2023, Michelin added Bombera to its California Guide.

=== Cooking style ===
When asked what part of Mexico her cuisine comes from she says, "Oakland and LA 'cause California used to be part of Mexico." She calls her style Chicano cooking. Many of her recipes are based on family recipes, which she often melds with Californian cuisine. She also describes her food as comfort food.

== Personal life ==
Rice-Cisneros is married to Carlos Salomon. They have one child, Xiomara.

In June 2019, Rice-Cisneros accused a server at a Japanese restaurant at Swan's Market of battery and filed a restraining order against him. She also accused him of stalking an employee at Cosecha. In November 2019, a judge denied the restraining order and dropped the case.
