= Epicurious =

American digital brand focused on cuisine

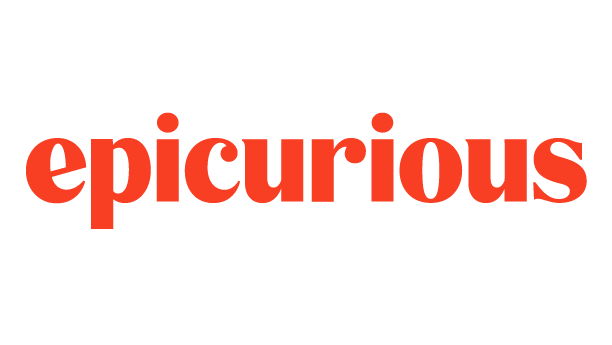
- Website type: Food writing
- Owner: Condé Nast Publications
- Editor: Dawn Davis
- Website: epicurious.com
- Commercial: Yes
- Registration: Optional
- Launched: 1995
- Current status: Active

Epicurious is an American digital brand that focuses on food- and cooking-related topics. Created by Condé Nast in 1995, it is headquartered at the One World Trade Center in Manhattan, New York City, where it is part of the publisher's Food Innovation Group that also includes Bon Appétit, with significant overlap in staff between the two companies.

== History ==
=== Launch and early growth (1995–2004) ===
Epicurious launched on August 18, 1995, as part of CondeNet, a subsidiary of Condé Nast that was created to develop content specifically for the Internet. Under the direction of CondeNet president Rochelle Udell and editor-in-chief Joan Feeney, former executive editor of Mademoiselle, Epicurious offered recipes, cooking tips and general information on food, wine, and dining out. The site also covered travel at launch and drew from existing content found in Condé Nast properties Gourmet, Bon Appétit, and Condé Nast Traveler.

From 1996 to 1997, Epicurious grew to include special initiatives like full Thanksgiving meal recipes lists, and entered into a deal with CNET to provide content for Snap! Online – a website and CD-ROM service designed to introduce specific resources to new Web users. Additionally, the site developed a partnership with Discovery Channel for a 26-episode cable television program titled Epicurious. The program debuted in 1998 on the Discovery Channel and was hosted by Jonathan Karsh.

That same year, Epicurious partnered with the InfoGear Technology Corporation, enabling access to more than 7,600 recipes via the CIDCO iPhone and other InfoGear products. Epicurious entered into an ecommerce deal with Williams-Sonoma that would allow sales of cookware through the site. That year, major changes to content were implemented, with the launch of Epicurious TV – a collection of food videos – as well as the spinoff of travel content into the newly formed Concierge.com.

Rochelle Udell left Condé Nast in 1999, and Elizabeth Shepard was named editor-in-chief of Epicurious the following year. The site grew to include 16,000 recipes by 2003.

=== Tenth anniversary, smartphone era begins (2005–2014) ===
In 2005, Epicurious added a mobile service called "Epi to Go", which enabled users to download recipes to their phones and PDAs. Tanya Steel joined as editor-in-chief in 2005 and under her direction in 2007, Epicurious partnered with The Culinary Institute of America (CIA) to produce "Inside the CIA", a video series that took viewers inside the culinary school. In addition, the site partnered with Ofoto founder Kamran Mohsenin to create Tastebook, an online tool that allowed users to create their own customizable, hardbound cookbooks using Epicurious’ collection of recipes. The site also expanded content to YouTube, producing a series of two-minute tutorial videos.

In April 2009, Epicurious launched its mobile app for the iPhone, which included search functionality for all recipes on the site, as well as the ability to create custom shopping lists. The app was first available through the iOS App Store, and versions for Android and Windows Phone 7 followed. The Epicurious app was featured in Apple commercials and was named a New York Times "App of the Week" on April 27.v

Together with Michelle Obama, Epicurious launched the "Chefs Move to Schools" campaign in the summer of 2010. Chefs Move to Schools enlisted more than 1,000 local chefs to educate students and staff in local schools across the nation about healthy eating practices.

Early in 2011, the Epicurious iPhone app was named as one of Time's 50 Best Phone Apps. In September of that same year, Epicurious announced a partnership with Cooking.com to create an online store that allowed consumers to purchase kitchenware and specialty food items tied to Epicurious recipes and content. In December 2011, the site made 75 Random House eCookbooks available for sale from authors including Tom Colicchio, Bobby Flay, Martha Stewart, and Alice Waters.

In 2012, Epicurious released its own print cookbook; a 400-page print edition that offered more than 250 recipes organized by season, with meal categories including breakfast, starters, mains, and sides. The cookbook debuted on the best-seller list.

Condé Nast announced on May 9, 2012, that it had bought the digital mobile shopping list and recipe service, ZipList. Epicurious became the first Condé Nast site on the platform, enabling users to save recipes from anywhere on the Internet.

Conceived originally by Tanya Steel, Epicurious launched the Healthy Lunchtime Challenge in 2012, a nationwide contest that was created through another partnership with Michelle Obama, as well as the US Departments of Education and Agriculture. The Healthy Lunchtime Challenge attracted 1,300 entrants in 2013. The contest continued annually into 2014 and 2015.

In June 2013, Carolyn Kremins, vice-president and publisher of Condé Nast Traveler moved over to Epicurious as SVP and GM. Nilou Motamed was named Editor-in-Chief and began working on a redesign with an eye towards highlighting non-recipe content, like restaurants and travel coverage.

By January 2014, Epicurious had developed new versions of its iPad and iPhone apps. Dubbed the "Epicurious Recipe & Shopping List", these effectively replaced the 2009 release, which had seen 7.5 million downloads to that point. The app launches were part of a larger rebranding strategy aimed at positioning Epicurious as a complete lifestyle brand as well as a destination for recipes.

=== Rebrand, relaunch, and 20th anniversary (2014–present) ===
Epicurious app as viewed on the Apple Watch Home screen

In August 2014, Condé Nast combined Bon Appétit and Epicurious into a single digital food platform led by Pamela Drucker Mann, Bon Appétit Senior Vice President and Publisher. Bon Appétit Editor-in-Chief Adam Rapoport was named Editorial Director of Epicurious. Kremins left Condé Nast and Motamed, who had remained as Editor-in-Chief at Epicurious, was let go a month later. The site's Director of Product Eric Gillin was named Executive Director, managing both product and editorial.

Under Gillin's direction, the Epicurious brand was relaunched on February 3, 2015, with a new logo and new content strategy, focusing on recipe curation and helping home cooks. The new design combined the existing recipe curation with new technology and content aimed at enticing and guiding home cooks. Two new tools were introduced: the algorithm-based ‘Cook It,’ which suggested dishes based on answers provided by the user; and ‘Food Forecast,’ which suggested recipes based on current weather conditions in the area. The mobile apps for Windows and iOS were redesigned as well.

Coinciding with the public availability of the Apple Watch in April 2015, Epicurious offered its own Apple Watch ‘Smart Timer’ app; geared toward helping home cooks time their food preparations based on existing recipes. The app launched with options for cooking five cuts of steak, six seafood preparations, 17 vegetables, and a total of 11 chicken and pork portions.

On August 18, 2015, Epicurious celebrated the 20th anniversary of its launch by publishing an oral history of the early days of the site. The piece features commentary from Rochelle Udell and Joan Feeney, among others.

On September 17, 2018, Epicurious launched a series on its YouTube channel titled "4 Levels", which consists four chef levels: amateur, a home cook, and a professional, often from the Institute of Culinary Education, cooking the same meal, with a food scientist then reviewing the chefs' work. On October 29, 2019, Epicurious launched the series "FAQ" that consists of four chefs and Rose Trout, a food scientist, answering questions from viewers.

On April 26, 2021, Epicurious announced they would no longer publish recipes that involve beef due to the environmental impact of cattle production. Old recipes that include beef will not be removed from the site, but will not be featured on the homepage.

== Awards ==
=== 2000 ===
- 2000 Webby Award – Living category
- 2000 James Beard Award WINNER – Lisa Chernick, Irene Sax

=== 2002 ===
- 2002 Webby Award – Living category

=== 2007 ===
- 2007 MIN Award Winner – Best Mobile App
- 2007 MPA Digital Award – Best Mobile Strategy

=== 2008 ===
- 2008 James Beard Award WINNER - Best Web Site Focusing on Food, Beverage, Restaurant or Nutrition
- 2008 Webby Award – Lifestyle Category
- 2008 OMMA WINNER - Social Networking

=== 2009 ===
- 2009 James Beard Award - Website Focusing on Food, Beverage, Restaurant, or Nutrition
- 2009 Magazine Publishers Association Award – Website of the Year, "Service & Lifestyle"
- 2009 Magazine Publishers Association Award – Best Online Community
- 2009 The National Academy of Television Arts & Sciences New York Emmy Award – Advanced Media: International/ Instructional

=== 2010 ===
- 2010 ASME Award – Mobile Media
- 2010 MIN BEST OF WEB – Tanya Steel inducted into Digital Hall of Fame
- 2010 Webby Award – People's Voice, Lifestyle
- 2010 Webby Award – People's Voice, Food/Beverage

=== 2011 ===
- 2011 Webby Award – Website, Food/Beverage
- 2011 Webby Award – People's Voice, Food/Beverage
- 2011 ASME Award – General Excellence in Digital Media, Service & Lifestyle
- 2011 ASME Award – Interactive Tool

=== 2012 ===
- 2012 Webby Award – Website, Lifestyle
- 2012 Webby Award – Website, People's Voice, Lifestyle
- 2012 Webby Award – App, People's Voice, Lifestyle

=== 2013 ===
- 2013 Webby Award – People's Voice, Food & Drink
- 2013 MIN Best of the Web – Marketing Campaign

=== 2015 ===
- 2015 Webby Award – People's Voice, Food & Drink
- 2015 Webby Award - Webby 50
