= Jenny Dorsey =

- Born: Shanghai, China
- Education: Columbia University
- Known for: Winner of Beat Bobby Flay (2016)
- Culinary career
- Television shows: Chopped, * Beat Bobby Flay, * Cutthroat Kitchen
- Website: jennydorsey.co

Jenny Dorsey is a Chinese-born American chef, food writer and the founder of a nonprofit named Studio ATAO. Dorsey is also known for competing on Food Network's television shows Chopped, Beat Bobby Flay, and Cutthroat Kitchen. In 2016, Dorsey won "Beat Bobby Flay" on Food Network.

== Early life ==
Dorsey was born in Shanghai, China and later attended Columbia Business School. Dorsey received her Diploma of Culinary Arts from the Institute of Culinary Education. Before Columbia, Dorsey attended the University of Washington through the Robinson Center for Young Scholars.

== Career ==
In 2018, Dorsey founded the nonprofit Studio ATAO in Los Angeles, and debuted her Asian in America dinner series.

On March 6, 2020 Dorsey gave a TEDx Talk titled "How Food Can Be A Source of Intimacy, Identity, and Vulnerability".

Dorsey has been recognized by Les Dames d'Escoffier (2017 Legacy Awards) and The Art of Plating (2019 'On the Rise' Honoree). She has been a featured chef at the James Beard House and was a 2019 Finalist for the San Pellegrino Young Chefs Competition.

== Reality television competitions ==
- 2015 - Contestant, Cutthroat Kitchen
- 2016 - Winner, Beat Bobby Flay
- 2017 - Contestant, Chopped

== Bibliography ==
- Avatar: the Last Airbender Official Cookbook (Insight Editions, 2021)
- The Infrared Grill Master (Ulysses Press, 2020)
- Healthy Cocktails (SkyHorse Publishing, 2019)
- Mastering the Instant Pot (SkyHorse Publishing, 2019)
- Joie de Vivre (Boucherie Restaurant, 2019)
- One Pot Meals (Dash, 2018)
- Air Frying for Everyone (Dash, 2018)
