= Lauren Braun Costello =

American chef (born 1976)

Lauren Braun Costello (born in New York, NY on October 19, 1976) is a chef, author, and culinary personality.

Lauren's culinary career began in 2002 when she enrolled at The French Culinary Institute (now The International Culinary Center). She launched Gotham Caterers that same year as Executive Chef and owner. She simultaneously ventured into food styling and has styled for some of the biggest names in the culinary world. Her creations have been featured on ABC's The View, The Early Show on CBS, and Fox & Friends. She was the author of a weekly cooking column called "The Competent Cook," on CDKitchen.com, and served as a recipe tester and developer for the 75th Anniversary edition of the Joy of Cooking cookbook.

In 2010, Lauren was tapped to host 45 episodes of a new AOL cooking series called Pantry Challenge. The series became one of the most popular on AOL's cooking channel, KitchenDaily.com, logging more than 5 million views in its first three months. Lauren's recipes and party-planning advice have appeared in The Los Angeles Times and the Chicago Tribune, and she has made numerous television appearances on WNBC's Today in New York. Lauren also appeared as a guest on ABC's The View with Meryl Streep, Amy Adams, and Nora Ephron to showcase some of Julia Child's favorite recipes for the release of the movie “Julie & Julia.”

Over the past ten years, Lauren has raised her two sons with her husband in New York and Westport, Connecticut. After her sons were older, she resumed her culinary career. "Through her "It's Lauren, of Course" segments, she presents culinary techniques intended to make home cooking more approachable, covering boxed lunches, weeknight family dinners, and client catering.

== Books ==
Lauren is the author of three books. The first, Notes on Cooking: A Short Guide to an Essential Craft (June 2009, RCR Creative Press), was endorsed by Jacques Pépin, Lidia Bastianich, Dan Barber, James Peterson, Michael Romano, Gael Greene, and Chef Daniel Boulud who wrote that Lauren and her co-author Russell Reich "bring you indispensable advice, experience, and know-how of many great chefs." Notes on Cooking received critical acclaim from The New York Times,Washington Post,Food & Wine, Gourmet,Fine Cooking, and Publishers Weekly. The book was a 'ForeWord Magazine "Book of the Year" Silver Award Winner and a Benjamin Franklin Award Finalist.

In addition to Notes on Cooking, Lauren is the author of The Competent Cook: Essential Tools, Techniques, and Recipes for the Modern At-Home Cook (November 2009, Adams Media) and the co-author (with Jackie Jafarian Broad) of Eat Your Breakfast Or Else! (October 2010, Three Puppies Press).

== Education ==
Lauren holds a B.A. from Colgate University and earned a Grand Diploma in Culinary Arts with distinction from The French Culinary Institute (FCI). While studying at FCI, she was named a recipient of the Les Dames d'Escoffier scholarship in 2003.
