= Troy Glass =

American actor and cook (born 2000)

- Born: Troy Joseph Glass; July 27, 2000 (age 26)
- Education: Redwood Middle School
- Occupations: Actor, cook
- Years active: 2010–present
- Known for: Kids React, Teens React, MasterChef Junior

Troy Joseph Glass (born July 27, 2000) is an American actor, chef, YouTuber, and social media personality.

In 2013, Glass became a semi-finalist on the first season of the American reality cooking competition MasterChef Junior. He cooked on the show at age 12 and finished in fourth place. He later cooked on programs such as The Home and Family Show and Access Hollywood. He also appeared as a contestant on the cooking game show Food Fighters where he was the first minor (at age 14 at the time) ever to compete, winning $20,000 and a full scholarship to The Culinary Institute of America.

Glass has worked with YouTube stars TheFineBros, appearing as a regular in the hit series Kids React (and on Teens React after September 2014) and appearing as a guest in another one of TheFineBros' web series, MyMusic.

Glass has also made appearances in Modern Family, True Blood, and Marvel's Agents of S.H.I.E.L.D. He landed a lead role on an episode of Nickelodeon's Deadtime Stories. He and fellow Deadtime Stories cast members were interviewed on Piper's Quick Picks. He has appeared in numerous commercials, music videos, and voice-over work. Troy also trains in wrestling and MMA.

== Career ==
Glass considers his father and Oreste Di Gregorio, the head chef at D’Amore's Pizza in Camarillo, California, as his culinary mentors. Glass's mother, Polly, is a waitress and manager at the pizzeria. Troy and his sister Emily appeared on a game show where they won the grand prize round-trip all expenses paid Hawaii Marriott resorts package worth $9,000. Glass cooked as a hobby since age 7, and began acting at age 10. He remembers his first kitchen session with his grandmother over the holidays. She was making latkes which he remembers as taking a long time. Glass is currently in college and training as a pro gamer. He says cooking is his main passion and he would give up an acting career to become a professional chef. Pasta is his favorite food to make.

== Filmography ==
=== Film ===
Year	Film	Role	Notes
2010–2014	Kids React	Himself	
2011	Alternative Reality	Student	
2012	Operation Cupcake	Baseball Player	
2012	MyMusic	Kid #4	YouTube series; 1 episode
2012	Paranormal Adoption	Billy	
2012	Infinite Love	American Cowboy	Video short
2012	Abra	Magician	
2014–present	Teens React	Himself	
2015	Toy Soldier	Brandon Harris	

=== Television ===
Television
Year	Show	Role	Notes
2012	Modern Family	Baseball Pitcher	Episode: "Diamond in the Rough"
2013	MasterChef Junior	Himself	Contestant; Fourth Place
2013	True Blood	Son	
2013	Deadtime Stories	Adam Riley	1 episode: "The Beast of Baskerville"
2013	Agents of S.H.I.E.L.D.	Camper #5	
2013	The Home and Family Show	Himself	Cooked alongside fellow MasterChef Junior finalist Dara Yu; 1 episode
2013	Access Hollywood	Himself	
2013	Piper's Quick Picks	Himself	Along with fellow cast members of Deadtime Stories
2015	Food Fighters	Himself	Contestant in season 2, episode 3; won $20,000 and a scholarship to The Culinary Institute of America

== Personal life ==
Glass currently lives in Thousand Oaks, California with his parents, Scott and Polly, and his sister Emily Glass.

== See also ==
- MasterChef Junior
