= Aliza Green =

American chef and writer

- Occupations: Chef, cookbook writer
- Known for: Farm-to-table movement
- Spouse: Don Reiff (deceased)
- Website: http://www.alizagreen.com/about/

External videos
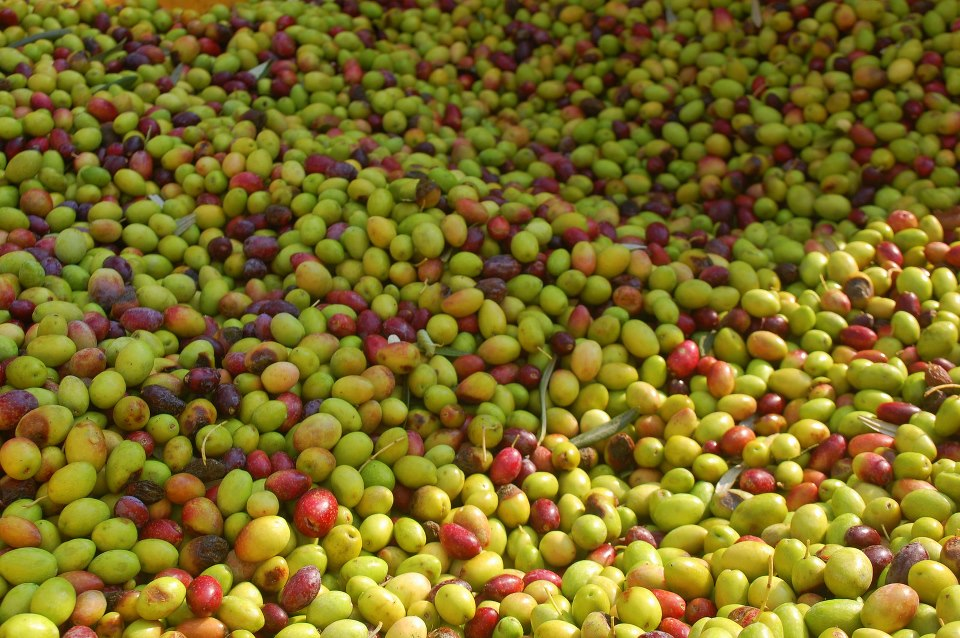
- “Chef Aliza Green: Green Gazpacho with Garlic, Grapes and Almonds”, GreensgrowPhilaProj
- “Dawn Stensland and Aliza Green, Making artisan pasta Artisan Pasta”, WMCNTV44

Aliza Green is an American chef and writer. In addition to being one of the first women chefs in Philadelphia, Pennsylvania, Green is known as a pioneer of the farm-to-table movement. She was one of the first chefs in Philadelphia to deal directly with local farms and utilize locally raised food in her restaurants. She writes as a food columnist and has published more than a dozen books about food.

== Career ==
Aliza Green grew up in Washington, D.C. as part of an extended family that included people in Israel and Borough Park, Brooklyn, a Hasidic Jewish section of New York City. She traveled extensively as a result, and was exposed to different cultures and foods from an early age.

Green opened her own catering business in 1975. Her first job as a chef was at the restaurant Under the Blue Moon in Philadelphia, PA. She studied briefly in Italy with Marcella Hazan. She then joined Ristorante DiLullo, where she became the executive chef for Joe Dilullo and won the restaurant a four-star rating. She also met her future husband, Don Reiff, the restaurant's architect. At Ristorante DiLullo, Green cultivated connections with farmers, buying from them directly and commissioning them to grow and harvest desired plants and zucchini blossoms.

I have always been interested in recognizing superior quality in foods, what they should look like, how products could be combined, their fragrances, their feel, seasonal changes, and how foods are transformed by different cooking methods and coming up with clear imaginative recipes.

Green was recruited by Judy Wicks at the White Dog Cafe in 1984. There she developed a regional menu around farm-to-table cooking, focusing on food simplicity and fresh ingredients.

From White Dog, she went to Apropos, developing a menu around Middle Eastern flavors "long before Middle Eastern flavors were trendy". She currently is the chef manager at Baba Olga's Cafe & Supper Club.

Although she lives in Philadelphia, Pennsylvania, Green has traveled extensively throughout the world, researching foods and their ingredients, and leads culinary tours in the Maremma and Umbria regions of Italy. She has written many cookbooks, beginning in 1997 with a collaboration with Georges Perrier to publish recipes from Le Bec-Fin restaurant. Since then, she has generally focused on specific groups of ingredients. Her publications include the successful Field Guide series.

Green has stated that women chefs and restaurant owners are still a minority:

Women don't get investors, so they're not going to be owners of restaurants. In many restaurants, there are no women in the kitchen. If there are, they're working in pantry or making the desserts.

== Bibliography ==
- Perrier, Georges; Green, Aliza (1997). Le Bec-Fin recipes. Philadelphia, PA: Running Press Book Publishers. ISBN 978-0762401703.
- Green, Aliza (2000). The bean bible : a legumaniac's guide to lentils, peas, and every edible bean on the planet!. Philadelphia, PA: Running Press Book Publishers. ISBN 9780762406890.
- Pernot, Guillermo; Green, Aliza (2001). Ceviche! : seafood, salads, and cocktails with a Latino twist. Philadelphia: Running Press. ISBN 978-0762410439.
- Green, Aliza (2004). Beans : more than 200 delicious, wholesome recipes from around the world. Philadelphia: Running Press. ISBN 978-0762419319.
- Green, Aliza (2004). Field guide to produce : how to identify, select and prepare virtually every fruit and vegetable at the market. Philadelphia, PA: Quirk Books. ISBN 978-1931686808.
- Green, Aliza (2005). Field guide to meat : how to identify, select and prepare virtually every meat, poultry and game cut. Philadelphia, Pa.: Quirk Books. ISBN 978-1594740176.
- Green, Aliza (2006). Field guide to herbs & spices : how to identify, select, and use virtually every seasoning at the market. Philadelphia: Quirk Books. ISBN 978-1594740824.
- Green, Aliza (2006). Starting with ingredients. Philadelphia, PA: Running Press Book Publishers. ISBN 978-0762427475.
- Green, Aliza (2007). Field guide to seafood : how to identify, select, and prepare virtually every fish and shellfish at the market. Philadelphia: Quirk Books. ISBN 978-1594741357.
- Green, Aliza (2010). The fishmonger's apprentice : the expert's guide to selecting, preparing, and cooking a world of seafood, taught by the masters. Beverly, Mass.: Quarry Books. ISBN 978-1592536535.
- Green, Aliza (2012). The butcher's apprentice : the expert's guide to selecting, preparing, and cooking a world of meat. Gloucester, Mass. : Hove: Quayside. ISBN 978-1592537761.
- Green, Aliza (2012). Making artisan pasta : how to make a world of handmade noodles, stuffed pasta, dumplings, and more. Beverly, Mass.: Quarry Books. ISBN 978-1592537327.
- Green, Aliza (2013). The soupmaker's kitchen : how to save your scraps, prepare a stock, and craft the perfect pot of soup. New York: Quarry Books. ISBN 978-1592538447.
- Green, Aliza (2015). The magic of spice blends: A guide to the art, science, and lore of combining flavors. New York: Quarry Books. ISBN 9781631590740.

== Awards and honors ==
- Member of Les Dames d'Escoffier International
- 1988, The Philadelphia Inquirer Hall of Fame as one of the top ten most influential people in the city's food industry
- 2001, James Beard Foundation Award, Best Single Subject for Ceviche! : seafood, salads, and cocktails with a Latino twist, with Guillermo Pernot
- 2004, The New York Times, Top cookbooks of the year for Beans
- 2004, Houston Chronicle, Editor's Pick for Field Guide to Produce
- 2012, Cooking Light, Top Cookbooks of the Last 25 Years, for Making artisan pasta
