= Angela Malik =

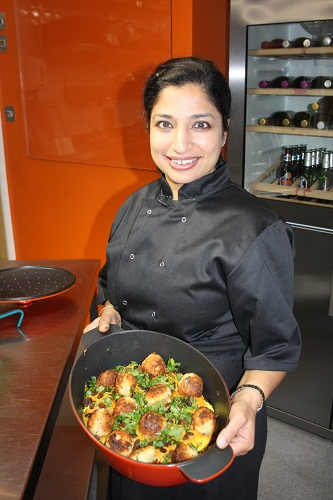
- Born: 3 December 1971 (age 54); Delhi, India
- Education: University of Edinburgh (BCom Hons); ICAS (Institute of Chartered Accountants Scotland); Catering College Diploma - Leiths School of Food and Wine; Imperial College Business School
- Culinary career
- Cooking style: Exotic/Anglo/Asian cuisine
- Current restaurant(s): Angela Malik Modern Asian Deli Ealing Angela Malik Modern Asian Deli Acton
- Previous restaurant(s): Acton, London
- Award(s) won: Asian Women of Achievement Award 2010, in July 2011 she was chosen to be a finalist on the British Airways Great Britons, Daily Mail 'Best exotic cookery course' 2007/8
- Website: http://www.angelamalik.co.uk/

Angela Malik (born 3 December 1971) is an Indian and Scottish chef, entrepreneur and food consultant. A businesswoman who built a deli business (now defunct) and multi-site Asian cookery school, The Angela Malik School of Food and Wine, Malik originally trained at Leiths School of Food and Wine and gained chef experience at London restaurants Bibendum and Vong.

She is programme director of contract caterers, Gather & Gather and is a member of Les Dames d’Escoffier, global network of women leaders and professionals in the fields of food, fine beverage and hospitality.

In 2017 Malik was appointed to the London Food Board in 2017, advising Mayor Sadiq Khan on food issues across the capital and how to develop a better food system for all Londoners, and helping develop a new London Food Strategy.

Malik was a finalist of the search for a British female chef by the TV show The F-Word on Channel 4. She also won the Daily Mail's 'Best exotic cookery course' for 2007/8. She is a regular panellist on BBC Radio 4’s The Kitchen Cabinet and has made guest TV appearances on Channel 4’s Sunday Brunch, ITV's This Morning and Kirstie Allsopp’s Homemade Christmas.
