= Thelma Pressman =

- Born: April 10, 1921
- Died: August 10, 2010 (aged 89); Rancho Mirage, California, US
- Occupation: Microwave cooking consultant
- Known for: Founded first microwave cooking school in the U.S.

Thelma Pressman (April 10, 1921 – August 10, 2010, Rancho Mirage, California) was a pioneering microwave cooking consultant, product development consultant, and cookbook author. In 1969 she opened the first microwave cooking school in the United States. She was the author of several microwave cookbooks and was a regular columnist for Bon Appétit magazine from 1978 to 1982. After her retirement to the Palm Springs area, she was a founder of the Palm Springs chapter of Les Dames d'Escoffier International and led restaurant tours throughout the Coachella Valley. She was often called "the Julia Child of microwave cooking".

== Biography ==
Pressman studied microwave technology at California Community Colleges in 1967. In 1969 she founded the first microwave cooking school in the United States in Encino, California. The Microwave Cooking Center became an industry test kitchen in which products were evaluated and cookware and recipes were developed for the nascent microwave industry.

Pressman was a consultant for Amana Corporation from 1968 to 1976 and Director of Consumer Education and Services for Sanyo Electric Co. from 1977 to 1987. In the latter position, she assisted in new product development, gave seminars nationwide, and contributed to the development of more than 100 microwave cookbooks and instruction manuals.

Pressman wrote hundreds of articles on microwave cooking for newspapers and magazines. She was a regular columnist for Bon Appétit magazine from 1978 to 1982. She also produced and hosted a live 30-minute TV show on microwave cooking called Fun Time Cooking. Her The Art of Microwave Cooking was selected by the Library of Congress for the Microwave Talking Cookbook for the Blind.

== Memberships ==
Pressman was a member of the Electrical Woman's Round Table, serving as that group's 1977 president, the American Women in Radio and Television, and the International Association of Cooking Professionals.

Pressman was a founding member of the Palm Springs chapter of Les Dames d'Escoffier International, an organization of women leaders in food, beverage and hospitality. From 1991 to 2005 she ran a popular "Restaurant Tour of the Desert", hosting weekly dinners for 25 to 100 locals and tourists at restaurants throughout the Coachella Valley.

== Personal life ==
Pressman was married to Morris (Mo) Pressman for 65 years until his death in 2005. They had two adopted sons, Paul and Rick.

She died on August 10, 2010, at the age of 89, and was buried in Riverside National Cemetery in Riverside, California, next to her husband Mo, who was a veteran of the US Army.

== Bibliography ==
- The Art of Microwave Cooking. Contemporary Books. 1983. ISBN 0-8092-5866-8. "thelma pressman."
- Microwave Cooking: Meals in Minutes. Irena Chalmers Cookbooks. 1983. ISBN 0-941034-16-X.
- Microwave Magic. Barron's. 1985. ISBN 0-8120-5595-0.
- Sybil's Guide to Microwave Vegetables. Henderson Associates. 1985.
- The Great Microwave Dessert Cookbook. McGraw Hill/Contemporary. 1986. ISBN 0-8092-4740-2.
- Idaho Potato Microwave Cookbook. Idaho Potato Commission. 1988.
- 365 Quick and Easy Microwave Recipes. Harper & Row. 1989. ISBN 0-06-016187-6. "thelma pressman."
