= American Bag Company and Union Hide Company =

Historic place in Oakland, California

- American Bag and Union Hide Company
- U.S. National Register of Historic Places
- Oakland Designated Landmark
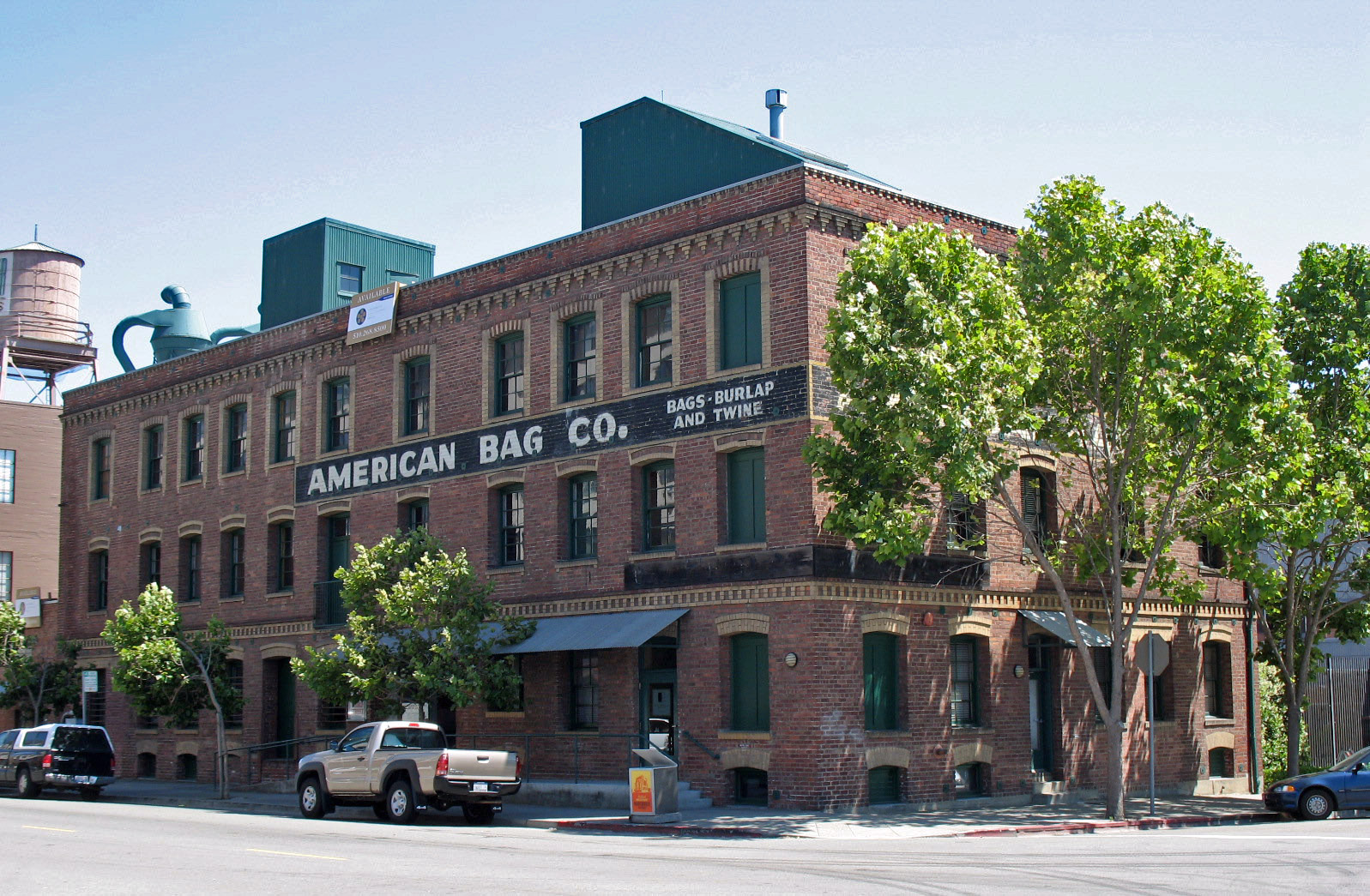
- American Bag and Union Hide Company

- Location within Oakland, California Location within California Location within the United States
- Location: 299 Third Street, Oakland, California
- Coordinates: 37.795036°N 122.272156°W
- Built: 1917; 109 years ago
- Architect: Leonard H. Thomas
- Architectural style: Early 20th century utilitarian Architectural
- NRHP reference No.: 99000896
- ODL No.: 130

Significant dates
- Added to NRHP: August 13, 1999
- Designated ODL: 1999

American Bag and Union Hide Company Building is a historical warehouse building in Oakland, California. The American Bag and Union Hide Company building was built in 1917. The American Bag and Union Hide Company building was listed to the National Register of Historic Places on January 10, 2007. Leonard H. Thomas (1882–1967) designed the American Bag and Union Hide Company building. Thomas also designed the Hotel Harrison and the Swan's Market building, also on the National Register. Thomas' family are makers of the Thomas Guides. The building was remodeled in 1994 and 1995 by Marianne and Ron Dreisbach. American Bag and Union Hide Company was an early manufacturer of vacuum cleaners and mending machines. American Bag and Union Hide Company used cotton burlap bags sold as Guaranteed Amerbags. American Bag and Union Hide Company is a brick building noted for the use of three-dimensional polychrome brickwork in its early 20th century utilitarian architectural style. The building was American Bag Co.-Union Hide Co. headquarters from 1912 to 1988. The company is now in Walnut Creek, California. A marker was place at the 299 Third Street Oakland building site by the Jack London Neighborhood Association. The building is now a 4,400 square foot apartment-condo building in Jack London Square.

== See also ==
- National Register of Historic Places listings in Alameda County, California
