= Bert Greene (cookbook author) =

American cookbook author (1923–1988)

Bert Greene (October 16, 1923 – June 10, 1988) was a cookbook author and food columnist for the New York Daily News from 1979 until his death in 1988. He was born in New York City.

== Career ==
He co-founded The Store in Amagansett, a gourmet take-out shop on Long Island, New York in the Summer of 1966 with Ralph (Buddy) & Martha Rofheart, Jacqueline Allison, and Dennis Vaughn.

== Milestone ==
His published books include Greene on Greens, Honest American Fare, and The Grains Cookbook all of which won the Tastemaker's Award.

The International Association of Culinary Professionals has a food journalism prize named also in his honor.

== Bibliography ==
- The Store Cookbook: Recipes and Recollection from The Store in Amagansett, 1974 (ISBN 0809288850)
- Bert Greene's Kitchen bouquets: A cookbook of favored aromas and flavors, 1979 (ISBN 0809277107)
- Honest American Fare, 1984 (ISBN 0809259648)
- Greene on Greens, 1984 (ISBN 0894807587)
- The Grains Cookbook, 1989 (ISBN 0894806106)
- Bert Greene's Kitchen: A Book of Memories and Recipes, 1993 (ISBN 089480765X)
