= Carol Brock =

American food critic and philanthropist (1923–2020)

- Born: December 14, 1923; New York City, U.S.
- Died: July 27, 2020 (aged 96); Manhasset, New York, U.S.
- Education: Queens College, City University of New York; New York University
- Occupation: Food critic
- Spouse: Emil Andrew Brock
- Children: 2

Carol Brock (December 14, 1923, Queens – July 27, 2020, Manhasset, New York) was a food critic and founder of Les Dames d'Escoffier. She was also a philanthropist. The State University of New York at Cobleskill awarded her a doctorate of Humane Letters in 2016.

== Early life and education ==
Carol Jean Lang was the only child of Charles and Helen. Her father ran a butcher shop, while her mother was a homemaker, and the family lived in Beechhurst, Queens. She earned a home economics degree from Queens College, City University of New York and a master's in food science from New York University. She married accountant Emil Andrew Brock when she was 20 years old.

== Career ==
Brock was a food journalist at the New York Daily News who strove to break what she called the "Pyrex ceiling".

Earlier, she worked for 23 years at Good Housekeeping magazine before spending three years as food editor of Parents magazine before moving to the Daily News in 1971.

She started at Good Housekeeping as an assistant food editor. Responsible for developing recipes, Brock eventually was a contributing editor for several of the magazine's cookbooks.

== Death ==
At the age of 96, Brock died of respiratory failure at North Shore Hospital. She was survived by sons Brian and Craig.
