= Charleen Badman =

American chef

- Born: Tucson, Arizona
- Culinary career
- Award(s) won: James Beard Award, Best Chef in Southwest 2019
- Website: www.fnbrestaurant.com/about

Charleen Badman is an American chef and co-owner of the FnB restaurant in Scottsdale, Arizona, who won the 2019 Best Chef in the Southwest James Beard Award. It was the first time since 2007 that a chef from Arizona won the award.

Badman is a past President of the Phoenix, Arizona chapter of Les Dames d'Escoffier.

== Biography ==
Badman’s father Donn was a construction worker. A high school program in Tucson, Arizona introduced her to the restaurant industry. She worked at a restaurant named Cafe Terra Cotta during her senior year and when she graduated in 1989, she was put in charge of the catering arm of the restaurant. She moved to Phoenix, Arizona and worked at Rancho Pinot Grill for Chrysa Robertson. She left when she found out Anne Rosenzweig was opening a new restaurant. For the next six years she worked at Rosenzweig‘s Lobster Club.

Badman and Rosenzweig opened the West Village restaurant Inside from 2001 until 2007. Badman then returned to Arizona and together with Pavle Milic, she opened FnB. Badman won the James Beard Best Chef Southwest in 2019. Badman is the Founder and Executive Director of Blue Watermelon Project.
