= Meredith Hayden =

American social media influencer and chef

- Born: January 17, 1996 (age 30); Wyckoff, New Jersey, US
- Education: Clemson University (BS), Institute of Culinary Education
- Occupations: Influencer, chef

Meredith Hayden (born January 17, 1996), who goes by the username Wishbone Kitchen, is an American social media influencer and chef. She first became known for her social media videos about her role as a private chef in the Hamptons. She has traditionally published one cookbook, The Wishbone Kitchen Cookbook, after previously self-publishing two other cookbooks, Wishbone Vol. 1 and Wishbone Vol. 2. She is set to host video podcast Wishbone Kitchen for Netflix.

== Biography ==
Hayden was born on January 17, 1996, and hails from Wyckoff, New Jersey. Growing up, she visited Nantucket every summer. She earned a Bachelors of Science in Marketing from Clemson University. She subsequently worked in advertising sales at Vogue while attending the Institute of Culinary Education, from which she graduated in 2019. That same year, she self-published two cookbooks: Wishbone Vol. 1, themed around holiday recipes, and Wishbone Vol. 2, which emphasized summer meals. She has stated that she printed only 500 copies of each.

She began working as a private chef in the Hamptons in 2020 and soon started posting day-in-the-life videos about her work under the username Wishbone Kitchen. By 2022, she had reached nearly one million followers on social media. She also worked as a caterer during this period.

In 2024, she moved from her New York City apartment into a house in the Hamptons. She also created a long-form YouTube series, Dinner with Friends, in 2024. In 2025, she accused Bon Appétit of copying her with the creation of a series of the same name and a similar color palette, which also focused on food. Her cookbook Wishbone Kitchen Cookbook was released in the summer of 2025. It reached number two on The New York Times Best Seller list, led to a sold-out nationwide tour, and remained on the list for twelve weeks.

As of 2026, she had a combined total of nearly four million followers across social media platforms.

She has stated that she likes to create food that is "as much fun to make as it is fun to eat". She has been described as "Gen Z's Martha Stewart" and "The Chronically Online Ina Garten", while referring to herself as "Walmart Martha Stewart". She has cited Stewart as a frequent inspiration and met her for the first time in 2025. She has stated that she views cooking and homemaking activities, such as needlepoint, as feminist and as "an act of self-care".

She has stated that she uses cannabis gummies to help her sleep. She suffered an ACL tear in 2025 and stated that she fully recovered in 2026. In 2026, she stated that she had been roofied and kidnapped after a Hollywood premiere in early 2022, and has she has experienced PTSD, agoraphobia, anxiety, and depression since the incident.

She partnered with Barilla to advertise their Al Bronzo pasta line and was featured on Today. She was named to the Forbes 30 Under 30 list and the Time 100 Creators in 2025. In July 2026, Variety reported that Hayden had made a deal with Netflix to create a video podcast, Wishbone Kitchen, for the streaming platform.
