= Cosecha =

- Interactive map of Cosecha

Restaurant information
- Established: 2011
- Closed: 2021
- Owner: Dominica Rice-Cisneros
- Food type: Mexican
- Dress code: Casual
- Location: 907 Washington Street, Oakland, California, 94607, United States
- Coordinates: 37°48′6.16″N 122°16′30.25″W
- Reservations: No
- Website: cosechacafe.com

Cosecha was a Mexican restaurant in Swan's Market in Oakland, California in the United States, which operated from 2011 until 2021.

== History ==
Chef Dominica Rice-Cisneros opened Cosecha in 2011. She decided to open it in Swan's Market, a historic market in downtown Oakland that, which, at the time, had been virtually empty and was seeking tenants to revive its market concept. She began looking to take out a loan for the restaurant and friends tried to talk her out of it, believing the old market was not a good investment. Rice-Cisneros' desire to open Cosecha was inspired by visiting food markets growing up in Los Angeles and while spending time in Mexico City. Swan's Market fit her vision. The market now features Cosecha, as well as more than a handful of vendors and restaurants.

Cosecha was featured on Check, Please! Bay Area in 2015 and Diners, Drive-Ins and Dives in 2016. Rice-Cisneros was nominated for a James Beard Award in 2019 for her work at Cosecha.

In March 2021, Rice-Cisneros announced that the restaurant would close. The primary reason for closure was the impact the COVID-19 pandemic had on business. She lost 80 percent of her regular customers. She also started to build out a second Oakland restaurant, Bombera, which she delayed opening in 2020 due to the pandemic. The closure of Cosecha enabled her to focus on opening Bombera. Rice-Cisneros closed Cosecha on March 27, 2021.

== Cuisine ==
Cosecha served breakfast, lunch, dinner and brunch on the weekends. The menu was small, changing regularly based on seasonal and available ingredients. The restaurant sourced organic produce from farms in Davenport and Guinda, California.

The restaurant used its own, handmade tortillas. The tortillas were made by a group of Latina women in their 50s and 60s that Rice-Cisnero calls "Tortilla Masters." The daily menu always included tacos, such as those filled with crispy fish, achiote-flavored chicken or pork belly. The restaurant also had quesadillas, tamales and tortas, the latter served on Acme bread. They made a mole verde, which Rice-Ciseros called "a love letter to Mexico City." The menu also included pozole or elote as specials. The restaurant also had salads and salsas made with seasonal ingredients On Saturday evenings, they offered a prix-fixe dinner. Brunch offerings may have included pancakes with housemade Spam and chilaquiles.

== Ambiance ==
Cosecha was located in a food court in an old market building in Old Oakland. The restaurant opened to the street by way of garage doors which are open year-round. It shared seating space with a handful of other restaurants and food vendors. The seating comprised wooden community tables and wooden bar tables facing out towards the street with metal chairs. It had an open kitchen.

== Reception ==
Chef Paul Canales named Cosecha one of his favorite East Bay restaurants in 2013. The restaurant was named one of the best places for pozole in 2016 by KQED.
