= Tiffanie Barriere =

Master Mixologist

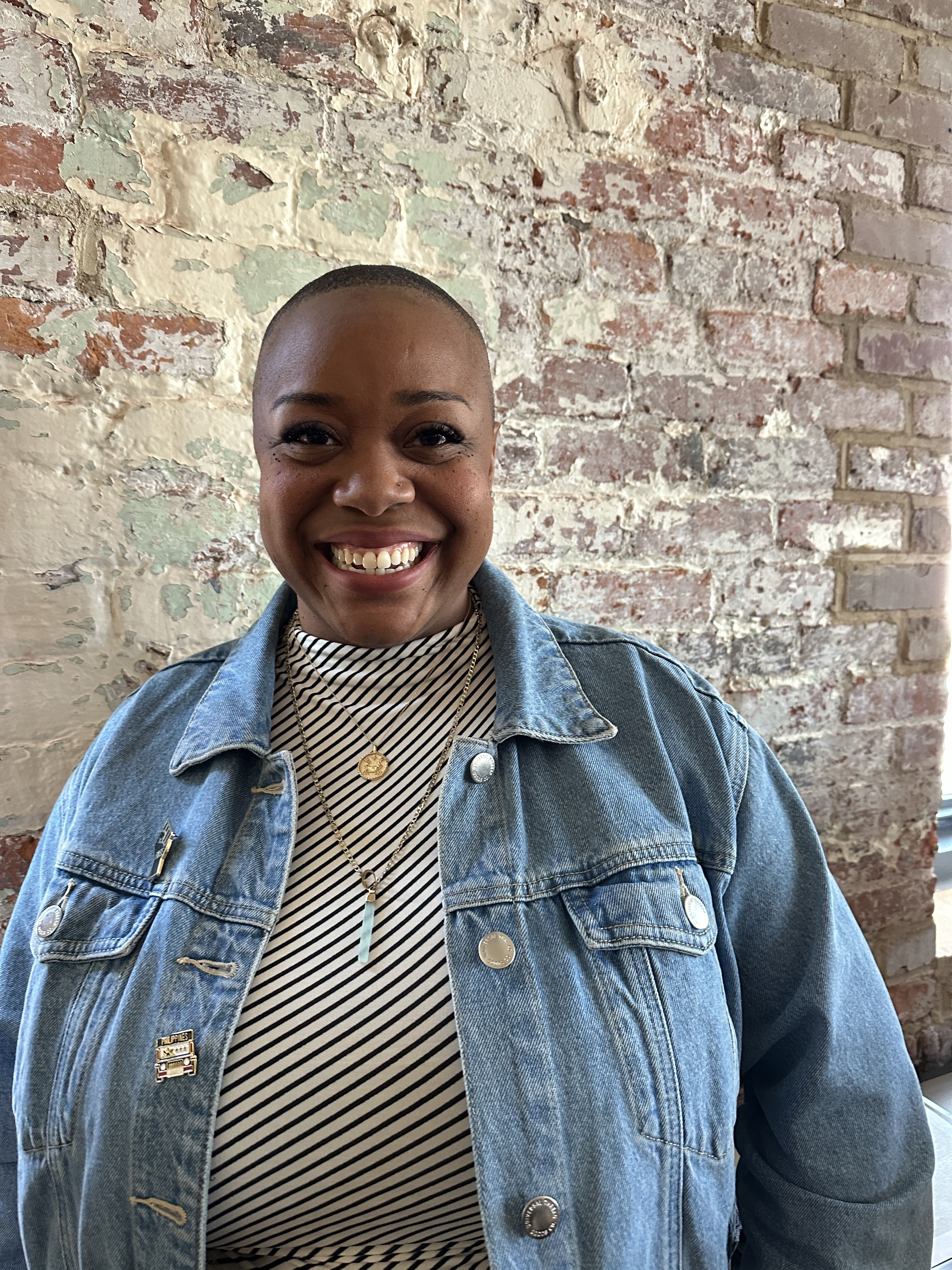
- Occupation: Bartender, teacher
- Employer: One Flew South (2009–2016)
- Website: https://www.thedrinkingcoach.com

Tiffanie Barriere is a master mixologist and spirits educator, who is also known by her nickname - “The Drinking Coach.” She was the beverage director for seven years at One Flew South restaurant in Atlanta's Hartsfield-Jackson Airport, which was voted the Best Airport Bar in the World in 2014 by Tales of the Cocktail and nominated for a James Beard Foundation Award under her leadership.

Barriere grew up in Louisiana and Texas as an only child. When her parents divorced, she moved to Atlanta with her father. She started off as a self-taught bartender but would later graduate from Pernod Ricard USA's BarSmarts program. She started bartending at the One Flew South around 2009 and left in 2016 to start freelance bartending. She is known for using beverages as a way to share African-American history.

She is a member of the Tales of the Cocktail Grants Committee and was inducted into the Tales of the Cocktail's Hall of Fame in 2020. In 2021, Barriere gave remarks and presented Toni Tipton-Martin with the Julia Child Award at the Smithsonian National American History Museum.

As of 2022, she is the Tales of the Cocktail Grants Committee co-chair along with Kitty Amann. In 2022, Barriere was an American Spirits Council of Tasters (ASCOT) Awards taster. She is also a member of Les Dames d’Escoffier Atlanta chapter.

Barriere has worked with and represented multiple brands, including but not limited to Bombay Sapphire, Cruzan Rum, and Four Roses. She has also been featured in a lifestyle publications, such as Essence, Food & Wine, Southern Living, GO Magazine, and Imbible.
