= Zack Hanle =

American cooking author and journalist

Dorothea Zack Hanle (c. 1915 - February 17, 1999), was an American cooking author and journalist who served as an editor of Bon Appetit, in addition to writing books about cooking, diet and exercise, as well as gardening. In 1976, she was one of the cofounders of Les Dames d'Escoffier, a society of professional women involved in the food, wine, and hospitality industries.

== Biography ==
Born in Philadelphia and known by the name "Zack" since her childhood, Hanle was raised in Ship Bottom, New Jersey. She attended Wilson College and Barnard College.

She began her professional career at Mademoiselle magazine. At Dell Publishing she wrote dozens of how-to books, before moving on to CBS Publications, where she edited at Epicure magazine and Everywoman's. She moved to Bon Appetit in 1976, and remained as its editor in New York until 1990, after which she was named an editor-at-large at the magazine, with which she remained associated as a consultant for the remainder of her life.

She co-founded Les Dames d'Escoffier in 1976, a society of professional women involved in the food, wine, and hospitality industries. In 1994, she was recognized with the James Beard Foundation Award.

A resident of both Ship Bottom and Manhattan, Hanle died on February 17, 1999, at the age of 83 in North Brunswick, New Jersey. She was survived by a daughter and a son.
