= Mimi Sheraton =

American food critic (1926–2023)

- Sheraton in 2022.
- Born: Miriam Solomon; February 10, 1926; New York City, New York, U.S.
- Died: April 6, 2023 (aged 97); New York City, New York, U.S.
- Education: Midwood High School
- Alma mater: New York University
- Occupations: Food critic, writer, lecturer
- Employer(s): Seventeen, The New York Times, Time, Condé Nast Traveler, Harper's Bazaar, Vogue, The Daily Beast
- Spouse: Richard Falcone
- Children: 1

Miriam "Mimi" Sheraton (née Solomon; February 10, 1926 – April 6, 2023) was an American food critic.

== Early life and education ==
Sheraton's mother, Beatrice, was described as an excellent cook and her father, Joseph Solomon, as a commission merchant in a wholesale produce market.

A 1943 graduate of Midwood High School, Sheraton attended the NYU School of Commerce, majoring in marketing and minoring in journalism. She went to work as a home furnishing copywriter and a certified interior designer.

== Food criticism ==
While traveling often as the home furnishing editor of Seventeen magazine, Sheraton began to explore her interest in food. In December 1975, she became the food critic for The New York Times. She was its first female restaurant critic. After leaving the paper in 1983, she wrote for magazines such as Time, Condé Nast Traveler, Harper's Bazaar and Vogue. She lectured at the Cornell University School of Hotel Administration, and the Culinary Institute of America in St. Helena, California. As of 2016, she was a food columnist for The Daily Beast.

== Personal life and death ==
Sheraton and her husband, Richard Falcone, had a son.

Sheraton died in New York City on April 6, 2023, at the age of 97.

== Bibliography ==
=== Books ===
- The Seducer's Cookbook, 1964
- City Portraits; a Guide to 60 of the World's Great Cities, 1964
- The German Cookbook, 1965
- Family Circle's Barbecues From Around the World, 1973
- Visions of Sugarplums: A Cookbook of Cakes, Cookies, Candies & Confections from All the Countries that Celebrate Christmas, 1986
- Eating My Words: An Appetite for Life
- 1,000 Foods to Eat Before you Die
- From My Mother's Kitchen, 1977
- Mimi Sheraton's Favorite New York Restaurants, 1991
- Food Tales, 1992
- Food Markets of the World, 1997
- Hors d'Oeuvres & Appetizers, 2001
- The Whole World Loves Chicken Soup, 2001
- The Bialy Eaters, 2000
- Eating My Words, 2004

=== Articles ===
- Sheraton, Mimi (December 3, 2012). "Charcuterie Dept.: Missing Links". The New Yorker. Vol. 88, no. 38. pp. 74–77.

== Awards ==
- 1974 Penney-Missouri Award
- 1996 IACP and James Beard Foundation Awards, for The Whole World Loves Chicken Soup
- 2014 James Beard Award for Magazine Feature Writing About Restaurants and/or Chefs, for an article on the Four Seasons' 40th anniversary in Vanity Fair
