= Tanya Steel =

American author

Tanya Steel (Tanya Wenman Steel) is an American food writer, editor, and author. She is currently the Executive Director of the Careers through Culinary Arts Program and formerly served as editor-in-chief of Epicurious.com.

Steel is the co-author of Real Food for Healthy Kids, a cookbook focused on meals for children. Her writing has appeared in publications including The New York Times, Forbes, and The Washington Post.

She was involved in the Healthy Lunchtime Challenge, a collaboration with First Lady Michelle Obama and the U.S. Department of Agriculture. The initiative encouraged children to develop recipes that were intended to be both nutritious and affordable. It included an annual event, the Kids’ State Dinner, held at the White House to feature selected recipes.

== Career ==
Steel began working in the publishing industry shortly after receiving her bachelor’s degree and obtained assistant and assistant editor positions with several magazine companies including Condé Nast, Food & Wine magazine, and Hearst Magazines. From 1995 to 2005, Steel worked as the New York's senior editor for Bon Appétit.

Beginning in 2005, Steel began working as the Editorial Director and Editor-in-Chief for Epicurious and in 2011, Gourmet Live and Gourmet.com were added to her role. In 2011, Steel, alongside then First Lady Michelle Obama, The White House and Epicurious, created and launched The Healthy Lunchtime Challenge and Kid’s State Dinner.

In 2016 and 2017, Steel served as the Editorial Director of Clean Plates, a technology/digital media company focusing on health & wellness food culture.

In 2017, Steel worked with the Public Health Agency of Canada and other partners to create Kid Food Nation, a food skills initiative for kids aged 7–12 that includes an online/TV platform, a Kid Food Nation cookbook, and a national recipe contest.

Steel is the current Awards Director for the Julia Child Award, given by the Julia Child Foundation for Gastronomy and Culinary Arts.

In 2018, Steel accepted the Director role for the International Association of Culinary Professionals.

In 2021, Steel was named Executive Director of the Careers through Culinary Arts Program. She previously held the role of VP of Strategic Development.

Steel also works as a strategic advisor for the Brain Health Initiative, while also volunteering for the Association of Frontotemporal Degeneration, and is a founding member of Cure MAPT FDT.

=== Publications and appearances ===
Steel has authored and co-authored 3 books centered around food and nutrition. Her first book, "Real Food for Healthy Kids", was published in 2008 and was co-written with Tracey Seaman. In 2012, Steel, along with other editors from Epicurious, authored "The Epicurious Cookbook." Her most recent book, "Food Fight: A Mouthwatering History of Who Ate What and Why through the Ages", was published in 2018.

Over several decades Steel has been a featured author in numerous publications including the New York Times, Epicurious, Gourmet Live, Food & Wine, Bon Appétit and others.

In addition to her published works, Steel has been a guest on various news and television programs including The View, CBS’s The Early Show, Hell’s Kitchen, and Chef's Table.

=== Awards ===
On three occasions, Steel has been awarded the James Beard Awards for Journalism. In 2003, she received the award in the "Restaurant Review & Critique" category and in 2008 & 2009 in the category of "Website Focusing on Food, Beverage, Restaurant and Nutrition".

Steel has been nominated for multiple Webby Awards.
