= 10th Street Market =

- U.S. National Register of Historic Places
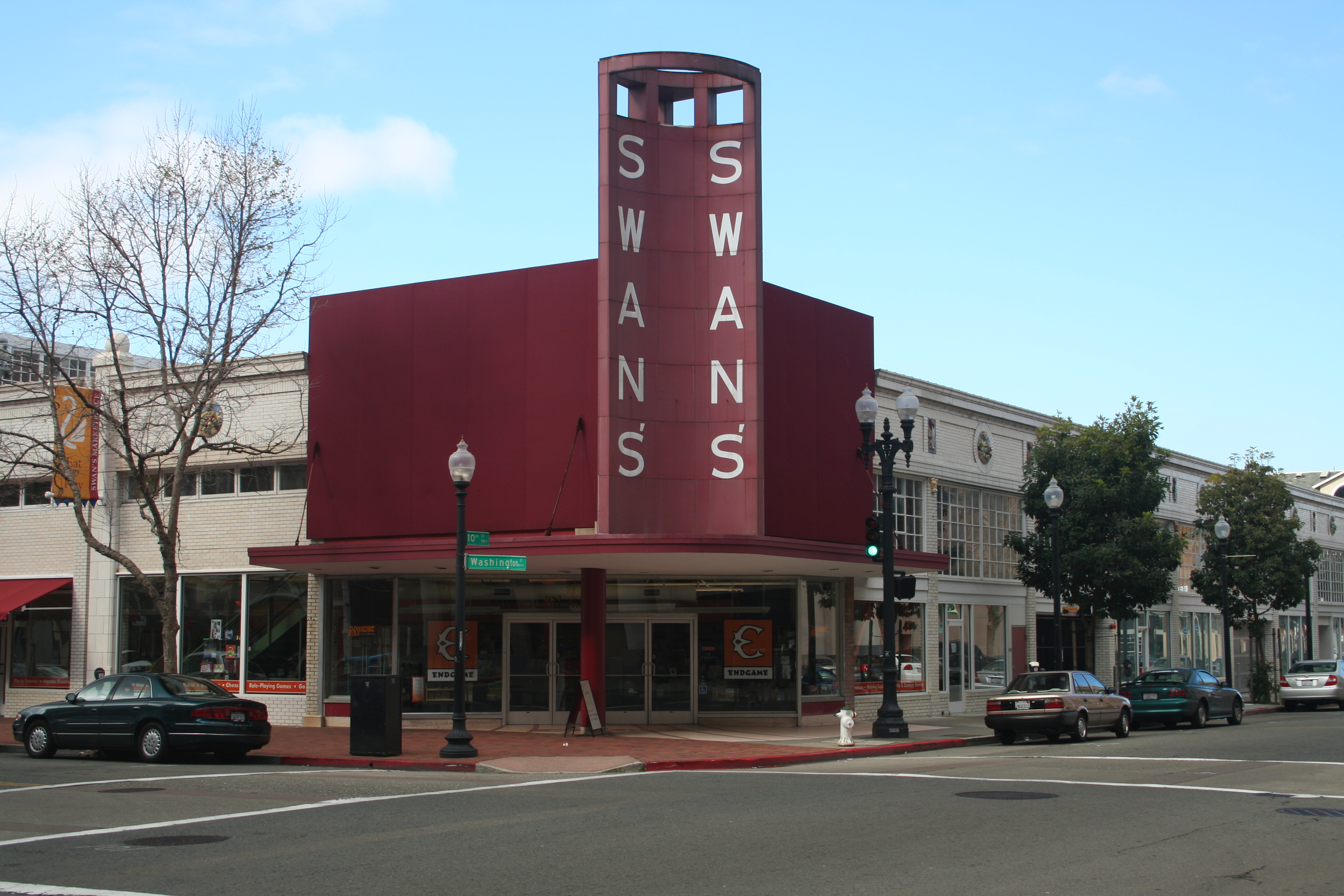

- Location within Oakland, California Location within California Location within the United States
- Location: 901-921 Washington St., Oakland, California
- Coordinates: 37°48′9″N 122°16′25″W
- Built: 1917; 109 years ago
- Architects: Thomas, Leonard; Knowles, William, et al.
- Architectural style: Early Commercial
- NRHP reference No.: 01000826
- Added to NRHP: August 3, 2001

10th Street Market, also known as the Swan's Market, Oakland Free Market or the Sanitary Free Market, was a commercial market district in Oakland, California. 10th Street Market was built in 1917 and expanded in 1926. It was named to the National Register of Historic Places on August 3, 2001. It is now known as Swan's Marketplaces, a mixed-use commercial and residential area. In 2001, Swan's Marketplace was awarded the Rudy Bruner Award for Urban Excellence silver medal.

== See also ==
- Cosecha, a restaurant at Swan's Market
- National Register of Historic Places listings in Alameda County, California
- American Bag Co.-Union Hide Co.
