= Peter Kump =

American chef

Peter Clark Kump (October 22, 1937 – June 7, 1995) was an American figure in the culinary arts. The founder of Peter Kump’s New York Cooking School, he also co-founded the James Beard Foundation with Julia Child.

== Biography ==
Kump was born in Fresno, California, in 1937. In 1953, his family relocated to Switzerland. He received a bachelor's degree in speech and drama from Stanford University and a master's degree in fine arts from Carnegie Mellon University.

Initially, his career was based in theater. He began a theater company after graduating from Stanford called Comedia Repertory Company on the San Francisco Peninsula. After 5 years he left to attend Carnegie Mellon University where, after taking the Evelyn Wood Speed Reading Class, was asked by Ms Wood to be on her teaching staff teaching speed reading in Pittsburgh and to members of President Richard M. Nixon's staff in the mid-1960s. He moved to New York City in 1967, becoming the national director of education for Evelyn Wood.

His involvement in the culinary world began with cooking classes at James Beard's culinary school, taking classes from Beard, Diana Kennedy, Simone Beck, and Marcella Hazan. The classes prompted him to open his own cooking school, Peter Kump's New York Cooking School, in 1974. In 1979, the school was relocated from his apartment to 307 East 92nd Street. A few days before his death, Kump sold the school to Rick Smilow who then moved it to 23rd Street, opening a few months later. In 2001, Smilow renamed the school The Institute of Culinary Education (ICE).

In the mid-1980s, Kump was president of the International Association of Culinary Professionals and the New York Association of Cooking Teachers.

In 1985, he co-founded the James Beard Foundation with Julia Child. After Beard's death, Kump and Child arranged the purchase of Beard’s Greenwich Village brownstone, converting it to the headquarters of the culinary arts organization. In 1991, he worked with the Foundation to establish the James Beard Awards. He was the president of the foundation until his death in 1995.

He died June 8, 1995, at his home in East Hampton, Long Island of liver cancer.
