= Cooking Live =

- Developed by: Joe Langhan
- Presented by: Sara Moulton
- Country of origin: United States
- Original language: English

Original release
- Network: Food Network
- Release: January 1, 1997 – January 1, 2003

Cooking Live is an American television cooking show on Food Network. Hosted by Sara Moulton, the show was broadcast live daily and featured Moulton preparing various dishes and taking calls from viewers.
