= Rachel Levin (author) =

American writer

Rachel Levin is a San Francisco-based author and journalist. In 2018, her first book, Look Big: And Other Tips for Surviving Animal Encounters of All Kinds, was published by Random House. The Wall Street Journal called it "a nifty idea carried out with humor and a deft touch."

Levin lives in San Francisco and has contributed stories, essays and cultural commentary to the New Yorker, the New York Times, T, the Wall Street Journal, Outside, Lucky Peach, Slate, Pacific Standard, Food & Wine, AFAR, Modern Farmer, and more. She is the 2018 recipient of the Karola Saekel Craib Excellence in Food Journalism Fellowship from the San Francisco chapter of Les Dames d'Escoffier. She is co-author with Evan Bloom of Eat Something: A Wise Sons Book for Jews Who Like Food and Food Lovers Who Like Jews, published in 2020 by Chronicle Books.
