= Lorna Sass =

American cookery author

Lorna Sass is an American author, known for her work with pressure cooking.

She has won the James Beard Award for two of her books, Whole Grains Every Day, Every Way and Christmas Feasts from History. In addition to her books, she has also written for periodicals such as The New York Times, The Washington Post, Gourmet, and Bon Appetit.
