= Jean Anderson (cookbook author) =

American cookbook author (1929–2023)

- Born: Helen Jean Anderson; October 12, 1929; Raleigh, North Carolina, U.S.
- Died: January 24, 2023 (aged 93); Chapel Hill, North Carolina, U.S.
- Education: Cornell University (BS); Columbia University (MS)
- Occupations: Food writer; editor

Helen Jean Anderson (October 12, 1929 – January 24, 2023) was an American cookbook author and editor.

== Life and work ==
Anderson was born in Raleigh, North Carolina. Her father was a botany professor at North Carolina State University at Raleigh at the time of her birth, though he later moved to the University of North Carolina in Chapel Hill. Anderson had a BS in food and nutrition from Cornell University and a MS in journalism degree from Columbia University. She began her journalistic career at The Raleigh Times, after receiving her undergraduate degree, and started at Ladies' Home Journal as a graduate student.

Anderson helped organize the James Beard Journalism Awards and for two years, co-chaired that committee. Though best known for her articles in Bon Appétit, Food & Wine, Gourmet, More, Travel + Leisure and other magazines, Anderson served as assistant food editor, then managing editor of The Ladies' Home Journal, as contributing editor at Family Circle and Diversion magazines, as chief consulting editor for Reader's Digest cookbooks, and as food columnist for New York Newsday and the Los Angeles Times Syndicate. She was a member of the James Beard Cookbook Hall of Fame and a charter member of Les Dames d'Escoffier and the New York Women's Culinary Alliance. Anderson wrote around 30 books, with the last being published in 2019.

An authority on Portugal, its food, wine, and folk art, Anderson traveled around that country for 40 years. Her Food of Portugal was named "Best Foreign Cookbook" in the 1986 Tastemaker Awards. Anderson's food, travel, and general features won various awards, among them, the Pulitzer Traveling Scholarship, the George Hedman Travel Writing Award, and two commendations from the Portuguese government.

== Personal life and death ==
Anderson moved back to Chapel Hill in 2007, after spending much of her adult life in New York City. She died at her home on January 24, 2023, at the age of 93.

== Bibliography ==
- The Art of American Indian Cooking (with Yeffe Kimball). Simon & Schuster: 1965.
- The Doubleday Cookbook (with Elaine Hanna). Doubleday: 1975. R.T. French Tastemaker Cookbook-of- the-Year as well as Best Basic Cookbook
- Jean Anderson's Processor Cooking. William Morrow and Company, Inc.: 1979
- Half a Can of Tomato Paste & Other Culinary Dilemmas (with Ruth Buchan). Harper & Row, 1980. Seagram/International Association of Culinary Professionals Award, Best Specialty Cookbook of the Year.
- Jean Anderson Cooks: Her Kitchen Reference & Recipe Collection. William Morrow and Company, Inc.: 1982
- Jean Anderson's New Processor Cooking. William Morrow and Company, Inc.: 1983
- The New Doubleday Cookbook (with Elaine Hanna). Doubleday: 1985.
- The Food of Portugal. William Morrow: 1986. Seagram/International Association of Culinary Professionals Award, Best Foreign Cookbook of the Year
- The New German Cookbook (with Hedy Würz). HarperCollins: 1993
- The American Century Cookbook. Clarkson Potter: 1997
- The Good Morning America Cut the Calories Cookbook (co-edited with Sara Moulton). Hyperion: 2000
- Dinners in a Dish or a Dash. William Morrow: 2000
- Process This! New Recipes for the New Generation of Food Processors. William Morrow: 2003. James Beard Best Cookbook, Tools & Techniques Category
- Quick Loaves. William Morrow: 2005
- A Love Affair with Southern Cooking: Recipes and Recollections. Foreword by Sara Moulton. William Morrow: 2007
- Falling Off the Bone. John Wiley & Sons: 2010
- Crisps, Cobblers, Custards & Creams. Houghton Mifflin: 2016
- Kiln to Kitchen: Recipes from Beloved North Carolina Potters. University of North Carolina Press: 2019.
