= Deborah VanTrece =

American chef

Deborah VanTrece is a chef, author and founder of the VanTrece Hospitality Group.

== Career ==
Based in Atlanta, she is the chef and restaurateur of Twisted Soul Cookhouse and Pours, opened in 2016. In April 2022, she opened Oreatha's at the Point in the Cascade Heights neighborhood. she opened Serenidad, a Latin Soul Food restaurant, in the same neighborhood, but in February 2023, less than five months after it opened, she closed it.

In April 2022, she opened Oreatha's at the Point, also in Cascade Heights.

VanTrece has said "Yeah, I check all the boxes" since she is a black woman who identifies as a member of the LGBT community.

After catering for foreign dignitaries at the 1996 Summer Olympics in Atlanta, VanTrece opened Edible Art. She served a salad named Twisted Soul, which later provided the name for her restaurant.

== Personal life ==
Wife Lorraine Lane is the co-owner of Twisted Soul. They were featured in The New York Times Style Magazine story “The Female Couples Remaking the Restaurant Industry.”

A native of Kansas City, she attended the University of Missouri where she studied fashion merchandising before taking a job as a flight attendant. She relocated to Atlanta but felt vulnerable when there was a flight attendant strike. She attended the culinary program at the Art Institute of Atlanta, graduating as valedictorian in 1994.
