= James Beard Foundation =

American nonprofit organization

- Formation: 1986; 40 years ago
- Founder: Peter Kump
- Website: jamesbeard.org

The James Beard Foundation is an American non-profit culinary arts organization based in New York City. It is named after James Beard, a food writer, teacher, and cookbook author. The foundation's programs include guest-chef dinners, scholarships for aspiring culinary students, educational conferences, and industry awards. The foundation develops programs related to American cuisine and the broader culinary industry.

The James Beard Foundation Awards have been described as one of the most prominent awards in the food industry.

== History ==
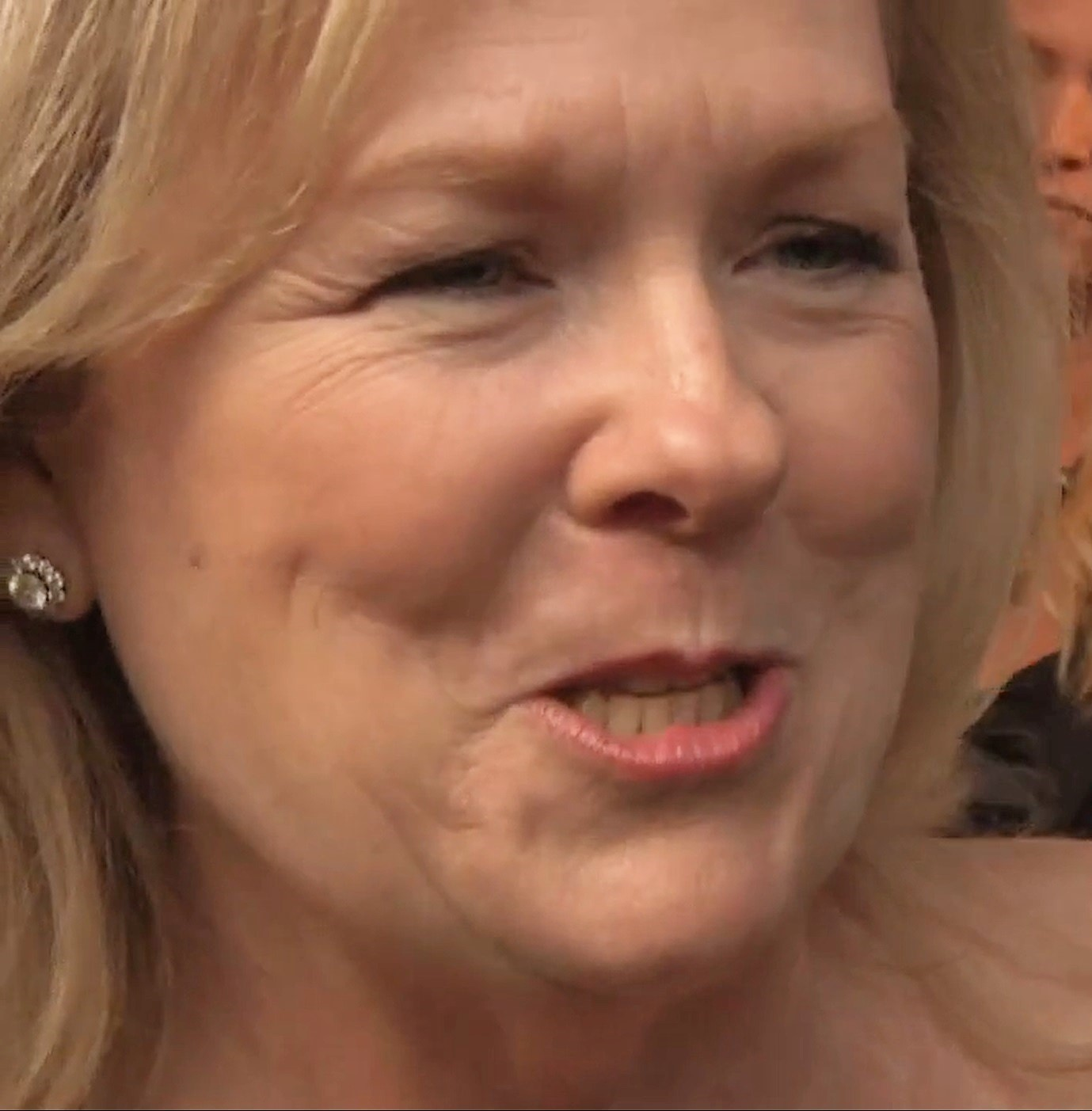
James Beard Foundation President Susan Ungaro interviewed at the James Beard Foundation Awards 2010

The foundation was started in 1986 by Peter Kump, a former student of James Beard who also founded the Institute of Culinary Education. At Julia Child's suggestion, Kump purchased Beard's New York brownstone townhouse at 167 West 12th Street in Greenwich Village and preserved it as a venue for hosting culinary events for the general public and culinary press. The first such dinner was organized at the suggestion of Wolfgang Puck, who cooked for the event, as a fundraiser in 1987. Kump later established it as a monthly event.

Leonard F. Pickell Jr. was nominated as president of the foundation in 1995. In August 2004, shortly before the results of a three-month audit were to be announced, he resigned. He was later charged with fraud after it was found that he misused the foundation's finances for undocumented expenses. Pickell later pleaded guilty to second-degree grand larceny and a $1.1 million theft. As a result of the scandal and his indictment by the Attorney General's Office, board members of the foundation were asked to resign in January 2005.

In April 2005 Susan Ungaro, formerly editor-in-chief of Family Circle magazine from 1976 to 2005, was appointed president. Following the scandal, the foundation subsequently introduced changes including creating salaried executive roles, appointing auditors, and expanding its staff. The foundation reported financial losses under Pickell's leadership, and incurred significant legal and accounting fees. Sponsorships, donations, and event revenues also dropped after the scandal broke prompting the foundation to take out a $2 million mortgage on the Beard home.

In October 2007, Woodrow W. Campbell, senior partner at Debevoise & Plimpton, became chair of the board after the resignation of Dorothy Cann Hamilton, who had served since 2005.

During Ungaro's presidency, the foundation increased its income, expanded its culinary scholarship programs, and increased its membership base through a new online program. It also moved its annual James Beard Foundation Awards Gala to the Lincoln Center first, and then later, to Chicago. The James Beard Foundation's traveling national food festival was also launched.

In 2018, Clare Reichenbach was appointed the foundation's new chief executive, succeeding Ungaro.Reichenbach's background is in marketing and consulting.

== Criticism ==
In 2023, the foundation faced criticism over their implementation of ethics policies for nominees for the James Beard Foundation Award.

== Programs ==
=== Greens ===
James Beard Foundation Greens events are aimed at bringing New York City food enthusiasts under 40 together for culinary experiences and networking opportunities. Most events take place outside the foundation's West Village townhouse and across various locations around the city. The program was established during Ungaro's presidency to attract a younger audience.

=== Awards ===
The James Beard Foundation Awards are annual awards presented by the Foundation to recognize achievements among chefs, restaurateurs, authors, and journalists in the United States. The James Beard Foundation Awards have been described by some media outlets as among the most prestigious in the food industry.

Award recipients are selected by a voting body of over 600 culinary professionals, including previous winners. Recipients receive a medallion engraved with the image of James Beard and a certificate from the foundation.
