= International Association of Culinary Professionals =

The International Association of Culinary Professionals (IACP) is a United States–based not-for-profit professional association whose members work in culinary education, communication, or the preparation of food and beverage. It was started in 1978 with help from American cooking personality Julia Child, and offers an award in her name.

== History ==
The organization was formed in 1978, as Association of Cooking Schools (ACS), and incorporated in 1979. The name changed to International Association of Cooking Schools (IACS) in 1981. By 1987 the association had expanded its reach to include international members and renamed itself the "International Association of Cooking Professionals".

In 1990, the association merged with the "Food Marketing Communicators" organization and again changed its name, to the "International Association of Culinary Professionals".

Since 1990, the association sponsored conferences in New Orleans, Philadelphia, Chicago, Portland, Providence, Baltimore, Dallas, and Seattle.

In 2011, Martha Holmberg, a cookbook author and food writer, was named chief executive officer. In 2018, Tanya Steel, a food journalist, healthy foods advocate, and creator of the Healthy Lunchtime Challenge & Kids' State Dinner with former First Lady Michelle Obama, a five year-initiative at the White House, was named chief executive officer.

== IACP Awards ==
The IACP Cookbook Awards are presented annually to honor excellence in cookbook writing and publishing. They were previously called "Tastemaker's" awards. These include awards named for Julia Child, for a writer's first cookbook, and a Jane Grigson Award for distinguished scholarship.

Its awards are considered one of the top honors in culinary journalism. Winners are covered in publications such as the Los Angeles Times, Food & Wine, Food52, America's Test Kitchen, New York Magazine, Eater, and the Washington Post.

The IACP also presents the Bert Greene Awards for food journalism, in magazine, internet, and newspaper categories.

The IACP also gives out awards for food photography and digital media.

=== Notable recipients ===
- Rick Bayless
- Heston Blumenthal
- Marcella Hazan
- Amanda Hesser
- Vivian Howard
- Thomas Keller
- Christopher Kostow
- Francis Lam
- Danny Meyer
- Sara Moulton
- Mark Oldman
- Yotam Ottolenghi
- Roads & Kingdoms
- Toni Tipton-Martin for Jubilee: Recipes from two centuries of African American cooking
- Jeanne Voltz
- Paula Wolfert
- Molly Yeh
- Joe Yonan
