= Institute of Culinary Education =

Culinary college

- Former name: Peter Kump's New York Cooking School
- Type: Private for-profit culinary school
- Established: 1975 (51 years ago)
- President: Rick Smilow
- Location: New York, New York, U.S. 40°42′45.09″N 74°0′55.15″W
- Campus: Urban
- Colors
- Website: ice.edu

The Institute of Culinary Education (ICE) is a private for-profit culinary school with locations in New York City and Los Angeles, accredited by the Accrediting Commission of Career Schools and Colleges (ACCSC). It offers career training, diploma and associate degree programs in the culinary arts both in person and online. Fields of study include culinary arts, pastry and baking arts, plant-based culinary arts, restaurant and culinary management and hospitality management. The school also runs one of the largest hands-on recreational cooking, baking and beverage programs in the United States.

== History ==
=== Early history ===
ICE traces its roots to 1975, when Peter Kump opened Peter Kump's New York Cooking School in his Upper West Side apartment, creating one of the first culinary schools in New York City. Kump's philosophy was to concentrate on teaching cooking techniques and flavor development at a time when most other cooking schools were only teaching recipes. In 1979, the school was relocated from his apartment to 307 East 92nd Street. In 1983, Kump inaugurated a professional program to train aspiring chefs. A number of his former teachers, including James Beard, Simone Beck, Marcella Hazan and Diana Kennedy taught classes. Other notable chefs, including Julia Child, James Peterson, David Bouley, and Jacques Pépin, were frequent guest instructors.

When Kump died in 1995, the school was acquired by Rick Smilow, an entrepreneur with an interest in education and the culinary arts. The school programs expanded and it moved to a new location in the Flatiron neighborhood of the Manhattan borough of New York City. It expanded in this location twice, once in 1999 and again in 2004, growing to 45,000 square feet over seven floors.

In 2001, the school's name was changed to the Institute of Culinary Education.

=== Since 2015 ===
In 2015, the school relocated to a 74,000-square-foot facility in Battery Park City that includes such amenities as the nation's first education-focused bean-to-bar chocolate lab, a hydroponic herb and vegetable garden, a culinary technology lab, and a mixology bar. It expanded in 2018 and opened a second campus in Pasadena, California. In 2019, the school began offering plant-based nutrition-focused culinary education at both campuses which was previously offered through the Natural Gourmet Institute.

In 2020, the Institute of Culinary Education acquired the International Culinary Center (ICC), a private, for-profit culinary school headquartered in New York City. ICC was founded as The French Culinary Institute by Dorothy Cann Hamilton in 1984.

In 2021, the Institute of Culinary Education launched an online diploma program in culinary arts. The same year, it launched a college-level associate degree program at its Los Angeles{ campus.

== Academics ==
The Institute of Culinary Education offers both in-person and online culinary programs at its campuses in New York City and Los Angeles. Programs include culinary arts, pastry and baking, plant-based culinary arts, restaurant and culinary management and hospitality management. It also provides continuing education and professional development courses in bread baking, cake decorating, and sommelier training. It also offers associate degree programs at its California campus in various culinary fields.

== Facilities and faculty ==
The Institute of Culinary Education has campuses in both New York City and Los Angeles. In New York City, ICE operates out of a 74,000-square-foot facility in Brookfield Place at 225 Liberty Street, across from the World Trade Center that includes ten teaching kitchens, a demonstration kitchen, three traditional classrooms and various amenities. In Los Angeles, its campus is 38,000 square feet with teaching kitchens, academic classrooms, and a learning resource center.

The faculty at Institute of Culinary Education includes chefs trained internationally and have included Barry Tonkinson, Herve Malivert, Michael Laiskonis, Penny Stankiewicz, and Rick Camac.

== Notable graduates ==
Notable graduates include Meredith Hayden.
