= Chef's Story =

Chef's Story is a 26-part Public Television series featuring Dorothy Cann Hamilton interviewing well-known chefs and restaurateurs. Hamilton, founder and CEO of The French Culinary Institute, conducts the interviews in front of culinary students in the first half of each episode. Each chef then moves into a kitchen in the second half and prepares a dish they consider signature or instructive. The FCI's International Culinary Theater acts as the host for each episode.

Inspired by Inside the Actors Studio, interviews focus on each guest's growth as a chef and the philosophy they bring to their restaurants.

Chef's Story is produced by Soho Culinary Productions, Full Plate Media, and Lemnos Development and debuted on public television stations in April 2007. A companion book compiled by Dorothy Hamilton and Patric Kuh was also published by HarperCollins.

== List of episodes ==
1. Rick Bayless
2. Anthony Bourdain
3. Lidia Bastianich
4. André Soltner
5. Bobby Flay
6. Daniel Boulud
7. Jacques Pépin
8. Thomas Keller
9. Cat Cora
10. Patrick O'Connell
11. Michel Richard
12. Alain Sailhac
13. Marcus Samuelsson
14. José Andrés
15. Todd English
16. Norman Van Aken
17. Suzanne Goin
18. Dean Fearing/Robert Del Grande
19. Dan Barber
20. Jacques Torres
21. Jean-Georges Vongerichten
22. Charlie Palmer
23. Charlie Trotter
24. David Bouley
25. Arun Sampanthavivat
26. Tom Colicchio
