= Lafayette (restaurant) =

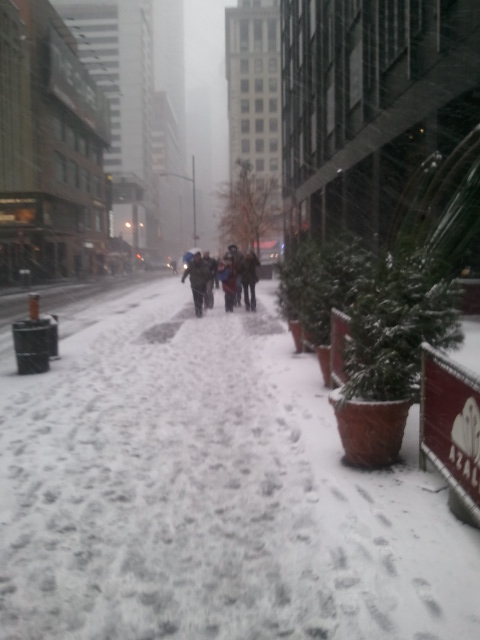
- Winter scene on 50th Street in Manhattan, the restaurant's former location
- Interactive map of Lafayette

Restaurant information
- Established: 1965
- Closed: late 1970s
- Previous owners: Jean Fayet; Jacqueline Fayet
- Food type: French
- Location: 202 East 50th Street, New York City, USA
- Coordinates: 40°45′20″N 73°58′13.5″W

Lafayette was a French restaurant in New York City located at 202 East 50th Street. It was established in 1965 and closed in the late 1970s. W magazine referred to it in 1972, as one of "Les Six, the last bastions of grand luxe dining in New York." The other five named were La Grenouille, La Caravelle, La Côte Basque, Quo Vadis, and Lutèce. In its heyday the restaurant was known for the quality of its cuisine, its celebrity clientele, and the legendary rudeness of its proprietor, Jean Fayet.

== History ==
The Lafayette was established in 1965 by two former employees of Le Pavillon, Jean Fayet (its former saucier and captain of waiters) and his wife Jacqueline (its former cashier). The Lafayette had a seating capacity of 50 and an intimate decor, with a fireplace surrounded by French tiles, copper tubs filled with dried flowers and artificial plants, and walls covered in red, blue and yellow striped fabric. The waiters were dressed in military-style blue tail coats with red piping. In his review of the restaurant shortly after it opened, Craig Claiborne, noted that the only jarring note in the decor was the "plethora of plastic greenery". The Lafayette's choicest table, where Jackie Kennedy often sat, was hidden around the corner of the blue-striped bar. The restaurant's popularity surged in December 1966 when Women's Wear Daily stationed a photographer outside to capture Jackie and her sister Lee Radziwill leaving the restaurant with Jackie wearing a skirt two inches above the knee. According to Nora Ephron, the photos were reprinted in virtually every American newspaper. Truman Capote and his friends were regular diners at the Lafayette as were Marion Javits, Aileen Mehle and Phyllis and Bennett Cerf whose publishing company Random House was across the street from the Lafayette.

Jean Fayet refused to accept credit cards, although he would allow selected customers to have charge accounts, and had very definite views about the way his customers should dress and behave, views which he did not hesitate to express or enforce. In March 1970, Gael Greene wrote a scathing review of the Lafayette in New York Magazine entitled "Lafayette, We are Leaving!" in which she chronicled the owner's legendary rudeness. According to Greene, people who had been refused tables included a male member of the Rothschild family for having long hair, the beauty editor of Glamour Magazine for having a skirt too short, and Valentino for wearing a turtle neck sweater. He chastised Angela Lansbury for propping her sunglasses on top of her head, Alfred Knopf Sr. for asking for coffee with his entrée, and Bette Davis for asking Yogi Berra (who was dining at another table) to autograph her menu. Fayet exclaimed, "The menus belong to the restaurant. They do not go out of the house." In a letter to the editor of New York Magazine after Greene's piece was published, Henry Grunwald, the managing editor of Time, praised the review and recounted how Fayet had recently refused to let him use his charge account because he had not eaten there for six months. Wrote Grunwald, "I'm afraid I made a bit of a scene with words such as 'Never darken our door again.' and 'Don't worry, I won't.'" Fayet's other prohibitions included women wearing trousers and anyone wearing a campaign badge or keeping shopping bags at their table.

In 1975, Gael Greene still listed Lafayette as one of the best French restaurants in New York City, despite her earlier criticisms of the owner's contentious attitude. However, she noted that on the night she visited, the restaurant was only 1/3 full and that the waiting staff had been cut significantly. By 1978, the restaurant had closed. In an interview in the New York Times that year, Fayet had no regrets about his strict dress code. "If, for example, I had permitted a man or a woman in a good-looking Christian Dior denim suit to dine in my restaurant, then someone else would have asked, 'Why not me?' But, alas, all the restaurants are giving in to a liberated dress policy."

== Cuisine ==
Fayet was from the Auvergne region of France, and this was reflected in both his menu and his wine list. The owner lamented that because of import controls many of the ingredients he would have liked to bring from the Auvergne such as raw Auvergne ham (a type of prosciutto), sheep tripe with calf's foot, tripe sausage, and unfrozen sweetbreads had to be substituted. Dishes which were praised in various reviews included cold sea bass with sauce gribiche, chicken with apples in a cream and Madeira sauce, coquille Prunier (scallops, shrimp, and other shellfish in a glazed cream, egg and white wine sauce), sea bass ambassadeur (with a mushroom purée and white wine sauce), pork country pâté with cubes of pork liver, lobster bisque, and several desserts—raspberry bavarois, bitter chocolate mousse, fresh pear tart, and floating island.

== Other Lafayette restaurants in New York City ==
There were two other well known restaurants in New York City with the name of Lafayette during the 20th century, both of which are also defunct. The earliest was Café Lafayette, a French restaurant in the Hotel Lafayette in Greenwich Village established by Raymond Orteig in 1902. He managed to keep it going through the Great Depression when many New York hotels and their restaurants went bankrupt, but it too eventually closed in 1949. In 1986 the Drake Hotel opened its Lafayette restaurant which reached the height of its popularity under its first chef Jean-Georges Vongerichten. After Vongerichten left in 1991 to start his own restaurant, it went through a series of chefs and its popularity declined. The Hotel Lafayette building was demolished in the late 1950s. The Drake Hotel was demolished in 2007.
