= Quo Vadis (New York restaurant) =

Restaurant information
- Established: 1946
- Closed: 1984
- Previous owners: Gino Robusti; Bruno Caravaggi
- Food type: French, Italian
- Location: 26 East 63rd Street, New York City, USA
- Coordinates: 40°45′57.2″N 73°58′9.7″W

Quo Vadis was a fashionable restaurant in New York City located at 26 East 63rd Street near the corner with Madison Avenue. It operated from 1946 until 1984. W magazine referred to it in 1972, as one of "Les Six, the last bastions of grand luxe dining in New York." The other five named were La Grenouille, La Caravelle, La Côte Basque, Lafayette, and Lutèce.

== History ==
The restaurant was established in 1946 by two Italians, Gino Robusti and Bruno Caravaggi, who met when they were both working in Spa, Belgium. They had originally come to the United States in 1939 to work in the Belgian Pavilion's restaurant at the 1939 New York World's Fair and stayed on to work at Brussels Restaurant on 26 East 63rd Street. Founded by Albert Giambelli who had run the Belgian Pavilion's restaurant, it was located on the ground floor of the Leonori Building, one of the first large apartment buildings in New York to convert their ground floor into retail space. In 1946 Robusti and Caravaggi bought the Brussels and renamed it Quo Vadis. The new restaurant's opulent decor featured Roman columns, Italian mosaics, and walls covered in red velvet. The Quo Vadis logo printed on their menus and matchbooks was an elaborate crest in red and green featuring a drawing of the Capitoline Wolf inside a large letter "Q". The two owners always wore tuxedos and their male customers were required to wear a coat and tie.

Within two years of its opening, Alexander Mackall's restaurant guide, Knife and Fork in New York, described Quo Vadis as "a delightful new restaurant unveiled by a couple of young paragons of politeness whose virtuosity as suggesters, carvers, servers and general pleasers is quite extraordinary." In 1968, Craig Claiborne wrote in The New York Times that it was one of the finest kitchens in Manhattan and awarded it four stars. Quo Vadis had its own publicist, Lanfranco Rasponi, who was also the publicist for The Colony, and in its heyday was frequented by numerous celebrities and socialites including Diana Vreeland, Lee Radziwill, Paulette Goddard, Jacqueline Kennedy, Frank Sinatra, Truman Capote, Andy Warhol as well as president Gerald Ford and Richard Nixon. Bob Colacello recalled that many of the celebrity interviews for Warhol's magazine Interview were taped at Quo Vadis because its vaulted ceiling and velvet-covered walls made for good acoustics. Amongst the interviews they recorded there were those with Truman Capote, Jack Nicholson, Burt Reynolds, and Mick Jagger. According to Colacello, Quo Vadis exempted Nicholson, Reynolds, and Jagger from its coat and tie requirement.

In 1975, New York Magazine's restaurant critic, Gael Greene, observed that while much of the cooking at Quo Vadis was still "impeccable", the quality of its service had declined and some of the dishes were undistinguished. She characterised the restaurant as "an aging grande dame in yellowed ermine." Robusti and Caravaggi retired in 1981 and sold Quo Vadis to Romeo Mattiusi and Bernard Norget, who also owned the nearby La Folie restaurant. However, the new owners filed for bankruptcy within two years. Robusti and Caravaggi briefly came out of retirement and resumed operation of the restaurant, but closed it definitively in 1984. A new restaurant, QV, then occupied the site, but it soon closed and in 1987 became Orsini's. Since 1996 the site has been occupied by Club Macanudo, a cigar bar.

== Cuisine ==
The restaurant described its cuisine as "Continental", combining classic French dishes with Italian ones. Their specialties included fondue bruxelloise (cheese croquettes with fried parsley), steak Diane, bollito misto, rare rack of lamb carved at the table, and eels in green sauce. Its Head Chef and Sous-chef in the 1960s were Marcel Grange and Leon Herviou.
