= La Grenouille (restaurant) =

French restaurant in Manhattan, New York

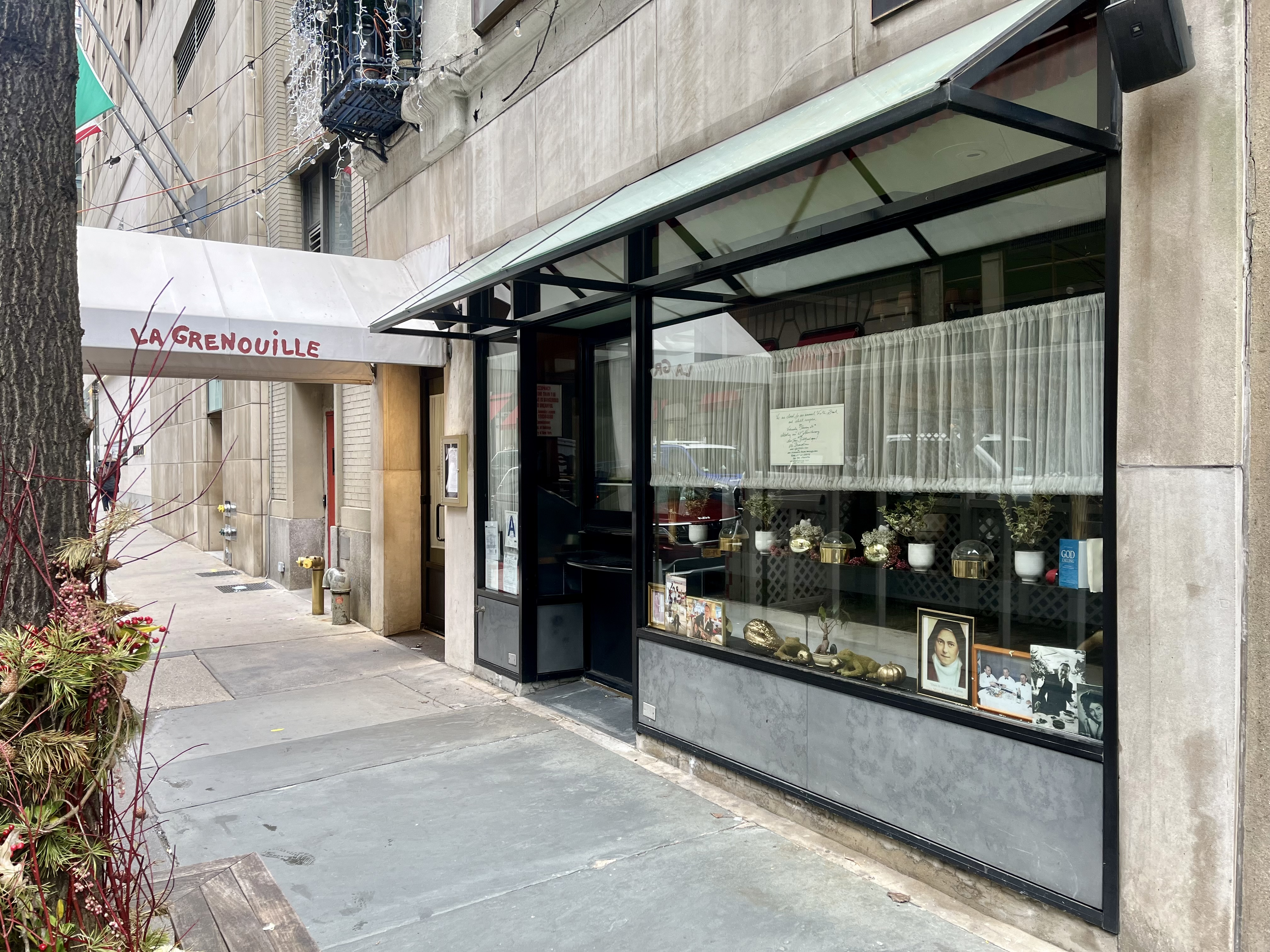
- La Grenouille in January 2024
- Interactive map of La Grenouille

Restaurant information
- Established: 1962
- Closed: September 2024
- Owner: Philippe Masson
- Previous owners: The Massons, Charles Sr. and Gisèle
- Head chef: Philippe Masson
- Food type: French
- Dress code: Jacket required
- Location: 3 East 52nd Street, New York, New York, 10022, United States
- Coordinates: 40°45′34.6″N 73°58′32.11″W
- Website: https://www.la-grenouille.com/

La Grenouille (French for "The Frog") was a French restaurant at 3 East 52nd Street between Fifth Avenue and Madison Avenue in Midtown Manhattan, New York City. Founded in 1962 by former Henri Soulé apprentice Charles Masson Sr. and his wife Gisèle, later with sons Philippe and Charles, La Grenouille became a location of choice among New York, U.S., and eventually international diners, including designers from the nearby Garment District of Manhattan.

The restaurant announced in September 2024 that it would close permanently. When the closure was announced, La Grenouille was the last operating New York French haute cuisine restaurant from the 1960s, and it remained a highly rated restaurant.

== History ==
The building at 3 East 52nd Street dates back to 1871. La Grenouille, the restaurant that now occupies the building, was founded in 1962 by Charles Masson Sr., a former Henri Soulé apprentice, and his wife Gisèle. Charles Masson Sr. had worked under Henri Soulé in Soule's original Le Pavillon restaurant at the 1939 World's Fair.

After the death of Charles Sr. in 1975, Gisèle continued to manage the restaurant until 2010. Their eldest son, Charles Jr., assisted Gisèle with her management duties from 1975 until 1994. At that time, Gisèle's younger son Philippe took over Charles Jr's duties until 2000, whereupon Charles Jr. returned. Gisèle died on November 5, 2014. After her death, Charles Jr. stepped down as manager in 2014 amidst a dispute with his brother.

La Grenouille was operated by Philippe Masson, from 2014. It was last operating New York French haute cuisine restaurant from the 1960s, having outlasted other well-known French restaurants like Lutèce, which closed in 2004.

In 2014, Charles Masson Jr. stepped down from his longtime role as general manager amid a bitter, longstanding dispute with his younger brother Philippe, who then took over direction of the restaurant. In 2021, the dispute between the brothers even led to fears that La Grenouille might close.

In June 2023, the restaurant was closed by Con Ed personnel when new gas meter detected a gas leak. The restaurant reopened on November 3, 2023. The restaurant building was subsequently placed for sale in early 2024. La Grenouille announced on September 12, 2024, that it would close at the end of the week. The restaurant space was then acquired by Quanjude, a Peking Duck chain originally based in Beijing with a Michelin-starred location in Vancouver, for $14.5 million with the restaurant opening in June 2025. The space kept the old aesthetics, outside of replacing the table lamps, for baiju bottles.

=== Antoine de Saint-Exupéry and Le Petit Prince ===
Earlier in the 20th century, before La Grenouille occupied the building of 3 East 52nd Street, the French painter Bernard LaMotte has his studio in the upper floors. An informal salon of creative people visited him, including Charlie Chaplin, Marlene Dietrich, Jean Gabin, and the writer and aviator Antoine de Saint-Exupéry, who wrote a good deal of Le Petit Prince there. In 2000, La Section Americaine du Souvenir Francais, put up a plaque outside the restaurant, memorializing the aviator and writer Antoine de Saint-Exupery, who often visited the building while in exile from German-occupied France during World War II.

== Menu ==
The menu of La Grenouille was essentially entirely "haute French cuisine," with menus presenting the French names of classic and more modern dishes, followed by the English translation, and an English description. Classic dinner menu staples included quenelles de brochet, sole grillée (grilled sole), sautéed frog legs, and the chocolate and Grand Marnier soufflés for dessert. In June 2023, the three-course prix-fixe "main seating" menu was $185 per person and the two-course prix-fixe main seating menu was $155 per person. There was also a "Late Night Jazz Menu" and a take-out menu.

== Renown ==
Aside from its haute French cuisine, La Grenouille was notable for its clientele, and was considered a location of choice among New York, U.S., and international diners. A segment of this clientele includes designers from the nearby New York fashion district; it was spoken of as a hotspot for its notables, e.g. Elle magazine creative director Joe Zee. Throughout its history, La Grenouille's patrons and visitors included Salvador Dalí, Carolina Herrera, Pauline Trigère, former New York City Mayor Michael Bloomberg, Woody Allen and more.

In addition, the restaurant was famous for its lavish floral arrangements and romantic lighting, a tradition started by Charles Masson Sr. and continued by his sons Charles Jr. and Philippe Masson. In 2008, Charles Jr. recounted for Vanity Fair magazine the story of his father painting individual lightbulbs with peach-colored paint to achieve the desired lighting effect, until G.E. started producing a similar bulb. When G.E. eventually discontinued the bulb in 1974, a crisis was averted when the Massons were able to custom order 50,000 similar lightbulbs from Westinghouse.

In 1972 W magazine referred to it one of "Les Six, the last bastions of grand luxe dining in New York." The other five were Lutèce, La Caravelle, La Côte Basque, Lafayette, and Quo Vadis. La Grenouille was the last operating New York French haute cuisine restaurant from the 1960s, a time when it dominated New York City's French haute cuisine.

In 2012, the restaurant won the James Beard Foundation Award for Outstanding Service.
