= Le Pavillon =

Le Pavillon may refer to:

- Le Pavillon (Henri Soulé restaurant), run by Henri Soulé
- Le Pavillon (Daniel Boulud restaurant), run by Daniel Boulud

== Similar titles ==
- Le Pavillon Hotel in New Orleans
- Le Pavillon brûle, a 1941 French comedy drama film
- Le Pavillon-Sainte-Julie, a commune in France
- Le Pavillon d'Armide, a ballet
