= Alan Yu (chef) =

Chinese-American chef

Chef Alan Yu, (Chinese: 余溟燁, born 24 January 1971), was born in Shanghai and raised in Washington, D.C.. Yu has worked in several kitchens around the world including some of New York City's and Washington DC's most desirable restaurants, including the original Jean-Georges Vongerichten and Michel Richard Citronelle. In Shanghai, he cooked at Le Plantane, 8 ½ Otto e Mezzo Bombana, Nice Meeting You – Chinese author Han Han's restaurant. He opened his own restaurant Le Rivage – a fine dining concept, situated on the northern stretch of the Bund.

== Awards and honors ==
Jury - S.Pellegrino Young Chef 2016
