= Charles Masson Sr. =

Charles Masson Sr. (May 1914 – February 4, 1975) was the founder, in 1962, and owner of Le Grenouille. Lawrence Van Gelder wrote in the New York Times that Masson "belonged to that aristocracy of New York restaurateurs who trace their professional lineage to the arrival here in 1939 of Henri Soulé".

== Biography ==
Masson would help his mother in the kitchen of the family hotel in Belfort when he was young. When he realized he could make more money working in the dining room, he changed his direction. He joined forces with Soulé in 1939 and came to New York with him and began working at Le Pavilion. In 1950, he opened Les Pyrenees in the Berkshires.

Masson died of cancer at the age of 60 at his home in Midtown Manhattan. His survivors include his wife Gisèle and two sons Charles Jr. and Philippe. Charles Jr. was 19 when his father died but he took over the restaurant. Brother Phillipe became majority owner.
