= Charles Masson (disambiguation) =

Charles Masson (1800–1853) is a British East India Company soldier, explorer and amateur archaeologist.

Charles Masson may also refer to:

- Charles Masson (ice hockey) (1884–1954), Canadian ice hockey player
- Charles Masson (field hockey), (born 1992), French field hockey player
- Charles Masson Sr., founder and owner of the restaurant Le Grenouille
- Charles Masson Fox (1866–1935), Cornish businessman
- Charles François Philibert Masson (1762–1807), French novelist and poet
