= Lutèce (restaurant) =

Defunct French restaurant in New York City

- Interactive map of Lutèce

Restaurant information
- Established: February 1961; 65 years ago
- Closed: February 14, 2004; 22 years ago
- Location: 249 East 50th Street, New York City, New York, United States
- Coordinates: 40°45′18.7″N 73°58′8.2″W
- Seating capacity: 60 (1961)
- Other locations: Venetian Hotel, Las Vegas Valley

Lutèce was a French restaurant in Manhattan that operated for more than 40 years before closing in early 2004. It once had a satellite restaurant on the Las Vegas Strip.

It was famous for its Alsatian onion tart and a sauteed foie gras with dark chocolate sauce and bitter orange marmalade. In 1972, W magazine referred to it as one of "Les Six, the last bastions of grand luxe dining in New York." The other five were La Grenouille, La Caravelle, La Côte Basque, Lafayette, and Quo Vadis, all of which are now closed.

== History ==
Lutèce was opened in 1961 by founder Andre Surmain, who brought young chef André Soltner to run the kitchen. The name (pronounced [ly.tɛs]) is the French version of "Lutetia," the ancient name of Paris. Shortly thereafter, Surmain and Soltner became partners, and they ran the restaurant together until Surmain returned to Europe. He first retired to Mallorca, then later ran Le Relais à Mougins in Mougins, southern France. In 1986, he returned to the US to open a branch of the same restaurant at the Palm Court Hotel in Palm Beach, Florida.

Soltner became chef-owner of Lutèce until he sold it to Ark Restaurants in the 1990s. A second branch, located in the Grand Canal Shoppes at The Venetian Las Vegas on the Las Vegas Strip, opened in 1999 with David Feau as executive chef. Both locations earned the Mobil Travel Guide four star rating for the year 2002.

Lutèce closed on February 14, 2004, after a period of declining revenues attributed to having alienated its longtime customers with a change in menu following the restaurant's sale, and more general industry changes such as a decrease in lunchtime expense account diners and the effects on New York City's tourism industry following the September 11, 2001, attacks.

Julia Child and a 1987 panel of food critics for Playboy magazine each proclaimed Lutèce the best restaurant in the United States, a rank it held in the Zagat's survey for six consecutive years in the 1980s.

== In popular culture ==
The restaurant's reputation has led to it being used as a touchstone in film and television work made or set during the period when it was open.

- In the 1963 Ian Fleming short story Agent 007 in New York, James Bond refers to Lutèce as "one of the great restaurants of the world".
- The 1971 film A New Leaf shows Walter Matthau's character, once wealthy but now broke, visiting his favorite restaurant for the last time.
- In the 1974 novel Marathon Man, "Doc" takes "Babe" and his girlfriend "Elsa" there for a meal.
- Referenced in Jane Chambers’s 1980 play Last Summer at Bluefish Cove where the character Donna mentions Lutèce mâitre ‘d who made a assumptive remark to character Sue, a wealthy Blueblood whom Donna is in a romantic relationship with.
- Mentioned in the movie Arthur, where the wealthy title character visits his dying butler, Hobson, in the hospital, and places a lunch order for Hobson, saying "l want the trout almondine from Lutèce. Tell Henri it's for me."
- In Walter Tevis's sci-fi novel The Steps of the Sun (1983), protagonist Belson laments the demise of the restaurant.
- During the restaurant's 1980s heyday at the top of the Zagat's survey, it was mentioned in the film Wall Street (1987) by Gordon's call girl when talking to Bud Fox (Charlie Sheen).
- Mentioned in the film Crossing Delancey by Isabelle Grossman (Amy Irving) as the place of her intended birthday dinner.
- Referenced in Wendy Wasserstein's 1988 play The Heidi Chronicles where character Scoop Rosenbaum praises the souffle to Heidi.
- Mentioned in the film The Prince of Tides by Pat Conroy, in a scene where Dr. Susan Lowenstein and Tom Wingo dine together.
- Mentioned in the film Other People's Money, when Kate Sullivan (Penelope Ann Miller) invites Lawrence Garfield (Danny DeVito) to discuss a proposition about New England Wire and Cable Company.
- Mentioned in Terrence McNally's 1995 Tony Award-winning play "Love! Valour! Compassion!" in Act I by Perry Sellars (Stephen Spinella(OOBC)/Anthony Heald (OBC))
- In the 1998 film The Last Days of Disco at the end of the film Josh mentions Alice invited him to go uptown to have lunch at Lutèce to celebrate her promotion.
- In season two of Mad Men, set in the 1960s, there are several scenes that are set at Lutèce and the restaurant is mentioned several times in other episodes.
- Referenced in Linda Fairstein's NY-based mystery series, especially Night Watch (2012). In it a renowned French restaurateur, son of the owner of a fictitious Lutèce, sets out to reopen the restaurant.
- In the HBO Max series Julia, episode “Foie Gras,” set in the mid 1960s, Julia Child's book editors have lunch at Lutèce and Julia has the signature foie gras.
- In the video game Genshin Impact, Café Lutėce is located in the Court of Fontaine. The food and recipes available for purchase refer to the signature dishes once served in the real-world Lutėce.
