= Michel Richard =

French and American chef (1948–2016)

- Born: March 7, 1948; Pabu, France
- Died: August 13, 2016 (aged 68); Washington, D.C., U.S.
- Citizenship: United States
- Occupations: Chef, painter, entrepreneur
- Known for: Citrus in Los Angeles and Citronelle and Central in Washington, D.C.

Michel Louis-Marie Richard (/mɪˈʃɛl rɪˈʃɑːrd/ mish-EL rish-ARD, French: [miʃɛl ʁiʃaʁ]; March 7, 1948 – August 13, 2016) was a French-born chef, formerly the owner of the restaurant Citrus in Los Angeles and Citronelle and Central in Washington, D.C. He owned restaurants in Santa Barbara, Tokyo, Carmel, New York City, Atlantic City, Las Vegas, and Washington D.C.

== Biography ==
Richard was born in Pabu, Brittany, France, on March 7, 1948, and raised in Champagne. Needing to help his mother care for his siblings, he learned to cook. By age 14, Richard was working full-time as an apprentice pâtissier at a hotel restaurant in Reims. After completing his military service as a cook in the French Army, he moved to Paris, where he was hired by French pastry chef Gaston Lenôtre at Maison Lenotre.

In 1974, Lenôtre sent Richard to the United States to open Lenôtre's short-lived New York branch, Chateau France. After 3 years, Chateau France closed, and Richard moved to Santa Fe, New Mexico, becoming pastry chef for the French Pastry Shop at La Fonda Hotel. In 1977, he was able to open the eponymous Michel Richard's Pastry Shop in Los Angeles.

By 1986, Richard was L.A.'s most famous French pastry chef when he opened his first restaurant, Citrus in West Hollywood. The success of Citrus led to opportunities to open more restaurants, including, in 1989, Citronelle in the Santa Barbara Inn Hotel, followed by satellites of Citrus in Baltimore, San Francisco, Philadelphia, and Tokyo, all of which eventually closed. In 1991, Richard was inducted into the James Beard Foundation's Who's Who of American Food. By 1993, Richard had nine restaurants, after opening a Citronelle in Georgetown.

In 1997, he sold half of his interest in Citrus (Los Angeles) to the Meristar Corporation, who were also his partners in Citronelle. In 1998, he moved to Washington, D.C., renovating the Citronelle there and renaming it Michel Richard Citronelle, making it his flagship restaurant. It would be his home-base until it closed in 2012.

In 2003, Richard became a U.S. citizen. He won the 2007 James Beard Foundation Award for Outstanding Chef.

In 2007, Richard opened a new restaurant, Central Michel Richard on Pennsylvania Avenue in Washington, D.C., and it won the James Beard Foundation Award for Best New Restaurant. That year, he also opened Citrus at Social in Los Angeles and Citronelle at Carmel Valley Ranch.

At 65, Richard opened a restaurant and bakery in the New York Palace hotel in 2013. The restaurant closed within a year.

On December 13, 2014, Michel was presented with the insignia of Chevalier de la Legion d'Honneur and Chevalier de l'Ordre National du Merit by the Republic of France.

Richard died at Sibley Hospital in Washington, D.C., on August 13, 2016, from complications after a stroke. At the time of his death, the Pomme Palais bakery in New York and Central Michel Richard were his last two restaurants.

== Awards and honors ==
- The Best Restaurants in the United States – Travelers Magazine (1987)
- Who's Who of Cooking in America – Cook's Magazine (1988)
- "Who's Who" in American Food and Wine – James Beard Foundation Award (1991)
- Best Chef, California & Hawaii – James Beard Foundation Award (1992)
- Top 20 Restaurants in the Country (Citronelle) – Gourmet Magazine (2001 and 2006)
- Member – Traditions & Qualité, Les Grandes Tables du Monde (2002)
- Best Fine Dining Restaurant and Chef of the Year, Best Chef of the Year – Restaurant Association of Metropolitan Washington (2002)
- Member – Relais & Chateaux Organization (2003)
- Outstanding Chef – James Beard Foundation Award (2007)
- Outstanding Wine Service [Mark Slater] – James Beard Foundation Award (2007)
- Best New Restaurant (Central) – James Beard Foundation Award (2008)

== Books ==
- Michel Richard's Home Cooking with a French Accent, Morrow, NY (January 1, 1993) ASIN: B001XGZ1Q8
- Happy in the Kitchen: The Craft of Cooking the Art of Eating, Artisan, (October 2006) ISBN 978-1-57965-299-9
- Sweet Magic: Easy Recipes for Delectable Desserts, Ecco, (November 2010) ISBN 0-06-192821-6

== Television ==
- Baking with Julia (Episodes 103 and 304)
- How to Cook Everything; Bittman Takes on America's Chefs (Episode 108)
- Great Chefs – Great Cities (Episodes 40, 62, and 76)
- Chef's Story (Episode 111)
- Cooking with Master Chefs (Chocolate Dome; Hot Chocolate Truffles. Episode 2)
- "Monet's Palate - A Gastronomic View from the Gardens of Giverny"
- "Colameco's Food Show - Michel Richard/Citronelle"
