= Jean-Claude Szurdak =

Franco-American chef (1937–2025)

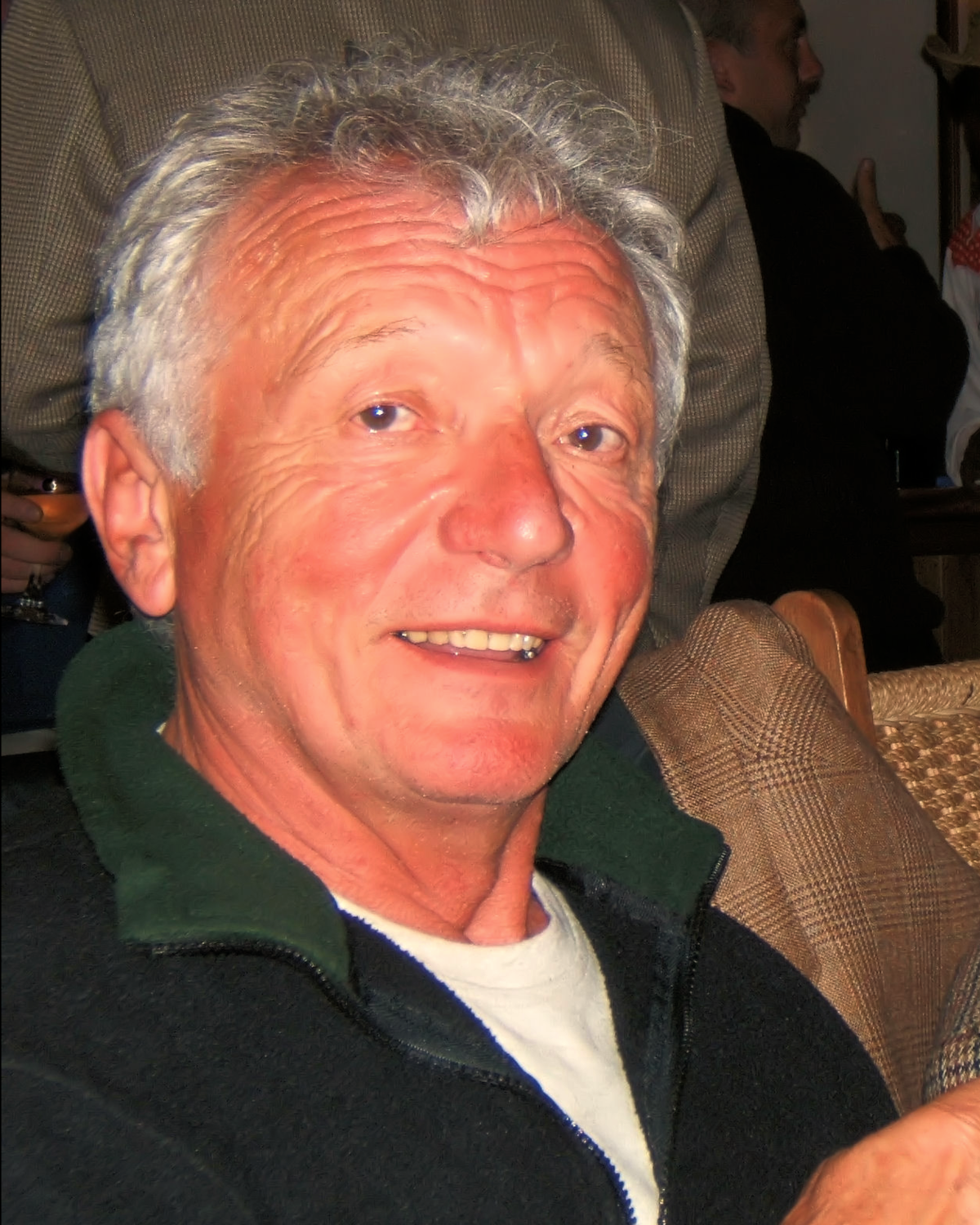
- Born: May 14, 1937
- Died: February 5, 2025 (aged 87)
- Occupation: Chef
- Spouse: Geneviève Szurdak
- Children: Nathalie, Valerie

Jean-Claude Szurdak (May 14, 1937 – February 2, 2025) was a Franco-American chef, best known as the life-long collaborator of Jacques Pépin. In the 1950s he was the chef to several French heads of state including Charles de Gaulle and other state dignitaries.

== Early life ==
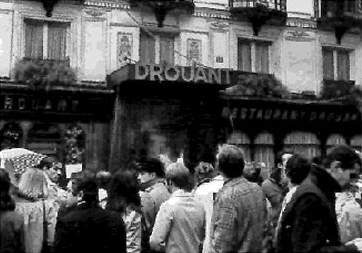
Drouant Restaurant, 1956

Szurdak fulfilled two apprenticeships in six years: one in cooking at the Drouant Restaurant and the other in pastry at a restaurant called L'Aubergade to the north of Paris. At L'Aubergade, only 14 years old, he studied under a patissier who had worked with Auguste Escoffier.

== Career ==
Szurdak met Jacques Pépin in 1956 when he was hired as a chef at Hôtel Matignon, the French Prime Minister's official residence, after Jacques asked to enlarge the kitchen staff. Jacques had this to say of their first meeting: "As [Jean-Claude] spun out the details of his training, I realized that the commander could not possibly have found a better partner for me in the kitchen." Together they were chefs for Prime Minister Félix Gaillard and also M. Aicardi, Gaillard's cabinet director, a presidential advisor, and a gourmand who demanded intricate and expensive meals to be prepared. One meal for twenty-eight took several days and nights of preparation. Later they cooked for Pierre Pflimlin, and finally for Charles de Gaulle, coordinating closely with Madame de Gaulle aka Aunt Yvonne. Official occasions were known to include foreign heads of state such as Dwight Eisenhower, Josip Broz Tito, Jawaharlal Nehru, and Harold MacMillan. Afterward, he served in the French army on a general's staff in Oran, Algeria.

By 1960, Szurdak moved to New York City. Shortly thereafter he started a traditionally French pastry business under the name of Elysee Pastries, Inc. with Jean-Pierre Lejeune. There were three locations. Offerings were sweet and savory which included petites fours, a variety of puff pastries, and tarts. By 1973, he was joined by Jacques de Chanteloup to open Elysee Charcuterie, expanding his goods to include authentically prepared meat products.

Szurdak later operated a catering business from Long Island named Jean-Claude Caterers for two decades. The business was popular with wealthy New Yorkers, gaining publicity mainly through word-of-mouth. Notable clients included Henry Kissinger, Jimmy Carter, Ronald Reagan, and Air France. Impressively, he was known to make one thousand pounds of salmon paté weekly with no written recipe reference.

His characteristic deadpan delivery was the comedic foil to Jacques Pépin's exaggerated tongue-in-cheek jests:

"I did nothing but work for 20 years [...] It took my soul away."

— Jean-Claude Szurdak

Later in life Szurdak was the back kitchen manager for Pépin's various TV series with KQED where he also made guest appearances to demonstrate various dishes and techniques with him. He would also visit classes and appear in lectures at Boston University, most notably in "Remembrance of Things Past."

Szurdak was an avid skier, frequenting Aspen, Colorado and the Catskill Mountains.

Szurdak's signature dish was puff pastry shells filled with potato salad, topped with chives, caviar, and crumbled hard-boiled egg.

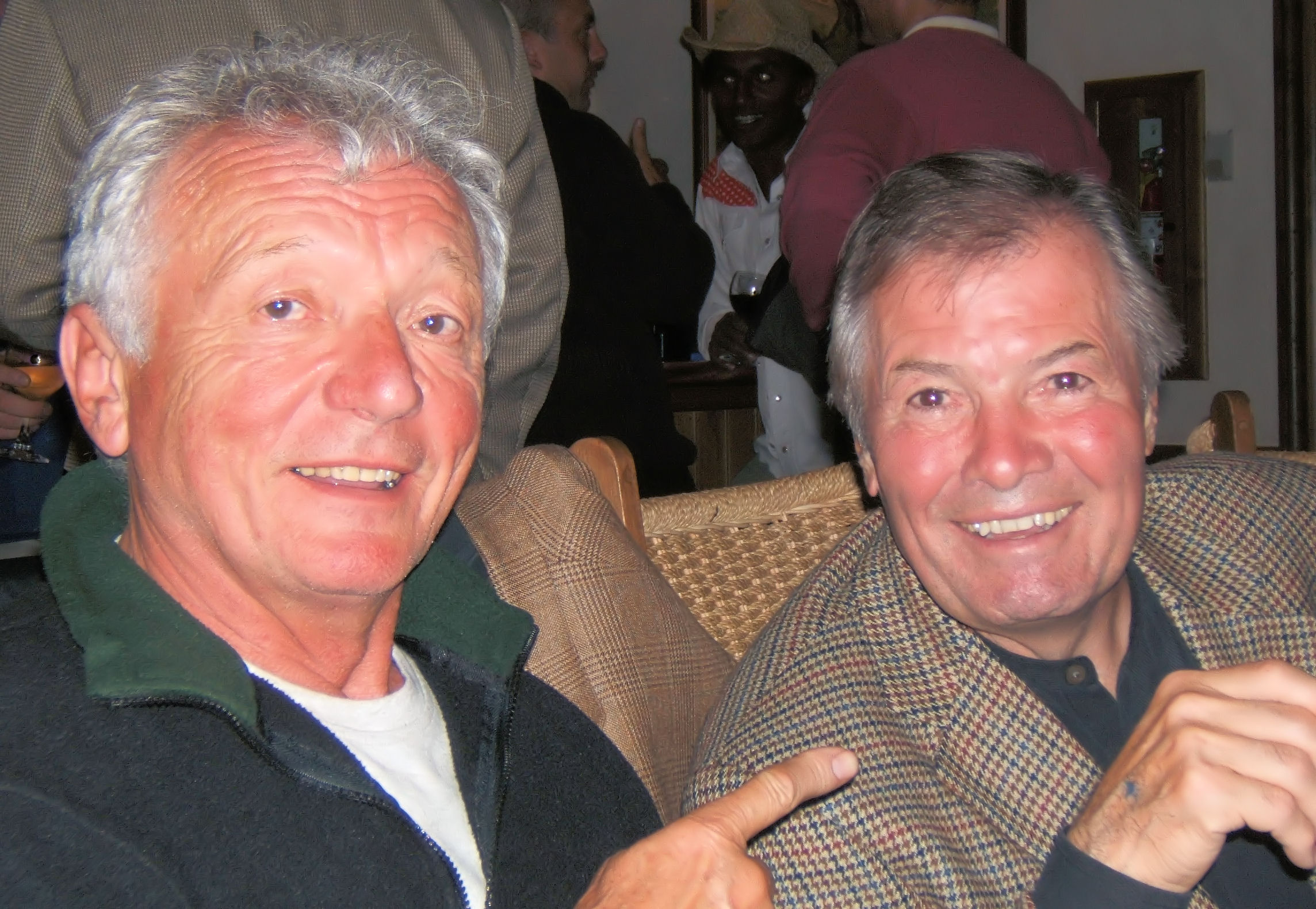
Life-long friends and collaborators: Jean-Claude Szurdak and Jacques Pépin, 2006

== Filmography ==
- Today's Gourmet (1991–1993) – Kitchen Staff, Guest Appearance as Self
- Fast Food My Way (2004) - Kitchen Manager, Guest Appearances as Self
- Essential Pépin (2011) - Kitchen Manager, Guest Appearances as Self
- Heart & Soul (2015) - Kitchen Staff, Guest Appearances as Self
- American Masters: Jacques Pépin: The Art of Craft (2017) - Self
