= Jacques Pépin =

French-American chef

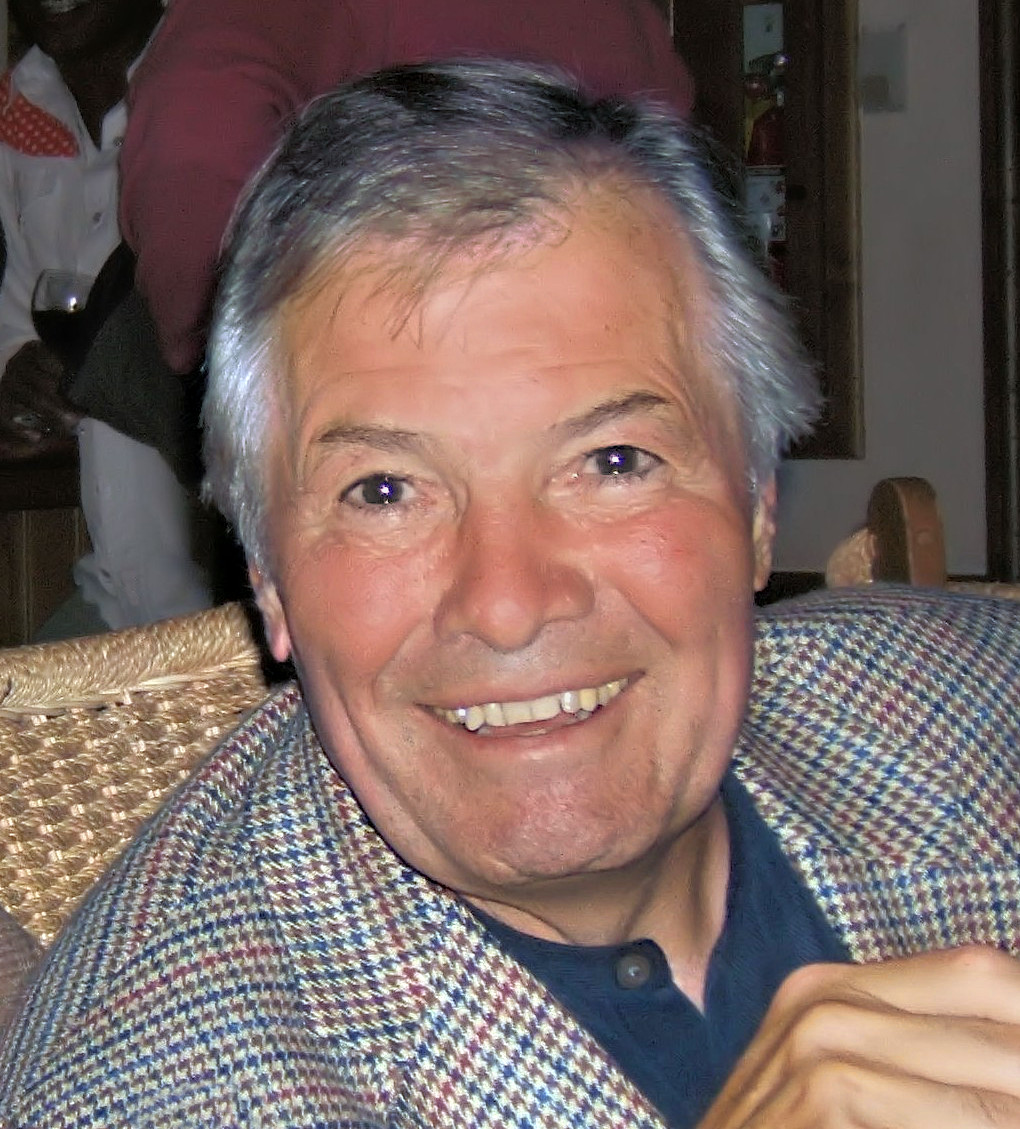
- Pépin in 2006
- Born: 18 December 1935 (age 90); Bourg-en-Bresse, France
- Education: Columbia University (B.A., M.A.)
- Spouse: Gloria Evelyn Augier (m. 1966; died 2020)
- Children: 1
- Culinary career
- Cooking style: American-French
- Previous restaurants
- Hôtel Plaza Athénée, Le Pavillon, Howard Johnson's, La Potagerie, Windows on the World, Russian Tea Room
- Television shows
- The Complete Pépin (PBS; originally aired 1997; relaunched 2007); Fast Food My Way; More Fast Food My Way; Jacques Pepin: Heart & Soul (2015–2016)
- Awards
- Legion d'Honneur (2004); L'Ordre des Arts et des Lettres (1997); L'Ordre du Mérite Agricole (1992)
- Website: jacquespepin.com

Jacques Pépin (French pronunciation: [ʒak pepɛ̃]; born December 18, 1935) is a French chef, author, culinary educator, television personality, and artist. After having been the personal chef of French president Charles de Gaulle, he moved to the US in 1959. He worked in New York's top French restaurants and took a culinary development job with Howard Johnson's. Pépin has appeared on American television and authored more than 30 cookbooks, some of which have become best sellers. He was a longtime friend of the American chef Julia Child, and their 1999 PBS series Julia and Jacques Cooking at Home won a Daytime Emmy Award.

Pépin has been honored with 24 James Beard Foundation Award nominations and 16 awards, the American Public Television lifetime achievement award, the Emmy Award for Lifetime Achievement in 2019, the Julia Child Award in 2015, and the Légion d'honneur, France's highest order of merit, in 2004.

Since 1989, Pépin has taught in the Culinary Arts Program at Boston University and served as dean of special programs at the International Culinary Center in New York City. In 2016, with his daughter, Claudine Pépin and his son-in-law, Rollie Wesen, Pépin created the Jacques Pépin Foundation to create culinary education opportunities, particularly for workforce development for adults with barriers to employment. He has lived in Connecticut since 1975.

== Early life and education ==
Pépin was born in 1935 in Bourg-en-Bresse, France. He was the second of three sons born to Jeannette and Jean-Victor Pépin. After World War II, his parents opened a restaurant called Le Pélican, where Pépin worked as a child, and later became known for his love of food.

At the age of 13, he started his apprenticeship at Le Grand Hôtel de l'Europe in Bourg-en-Bresse.

Pépin achieved his university education in his 30s, after his move to the United States in 1959. He enrolled in English for foreign students, a GED equivalent, and eventually General Studies classes toward a Bachelor of Arts degree at Columbia University. He earned his Bachelor of Arts in 1970 from Columbia University's School of General Studies, and in 1972, his Master of Arts in French Literature from the Columbia Graduate School of Arts and Sciences. He entered into a doctoral program at Columbia, but his proposed thesis on French food in literature was rejected for being too frivolous for serious academic pursuit.

== Early career ==
At age 16, Pépin worked in Paris, training under Lucien Diat at the Plaza Athénée. From 1956 to 1958, during his military service, he was recognized for his culinary training and skill and was ordered to work in the Office of the Treasury, where he met his long-time cooking partner, Jean-Claude Szurdak, and eventually became the personal chef to three French heads of state, including Charles de Gaulle.

In 1959, Pépin went to the United States to work at the restaurant Le Pavillon. Soon after his arrival, The New York Times's food editor Craig Claiborne introduced him to James Beard and Helen McCully. McCully introduced him to Julia Child, who became a lifelong friend and collaborator. In 1961, after Pépin had declined an offer from John F. Kennedy and Jacqueline Kennedy to serve as chef at the White House, Howard Johnson, a regular Le Pavillon customer, hired him to work alongside fellow Frenchman Pierre Franey to develop food lines for his chain of Howard Johnson's restaurants, where Pépin served as the director of research and development.

In 1970, Pépin opened a specialty soup restaurant and lunch counter on Manhattan's 5th Avenue called La Potagerie, and began to enjoy popular success with appearances on talk shows such as What's My Line? and To Tell the Truth. His career as a restaurant chef ended abruptly with a near fatal car accident in 1974.

== Middle career ==
After a car accident which damaged his left arm, Pépin began working as an educator, author and eventually television personality. Pépin worked as a consultant for restaurateur Joe Baum on his Windows on the World project, and offered classes at small cooking schools and cookware shops around the United States. In 1976, Pépin authored his cookbook La Technique, followed by La Méthode in 1979. The use of thousands of photographs illustrating techniques and methods. The books are credited by chef Tom Colicchio and others as helping them to learn the craft of cooking.

In 1982, along with Alain Sailhac and André Soltner, Pépin was invited by Dorothy Cann Hamilton to become one of the deans at the newly formed French Culinary Institute, in New York City, now known as the International Culinary Center (ICC). Also in 1982, he filmed his first television series, with PBS local station WJCT-TV in Jacksonville, Florida, and published a companion cookbook entitled Everyday Cooking with Jacques Pépin. Through the 1980s and into the 1990s, Pépin was published as a columnist for The New York Times, and a guest author for Gourmet and Food & Wine. He authored several more cookbooks, including The Art of Cooking, volumes 1 and 2, and The Short-Cut Cook.

In 1989, Pépin partnered with Julia Child and Rebecca Alssid to create a culinary certificate program within the Metropolitan College at Boston University (BU). This effort eventually led to the first, and still one of the few, master's degrees in Gastronomy. Pépin's 1991 television series Today’s Gourmet, filmed at KQED studios in San Francisco was created from recipes from several books, brought together in the companion cookbook Jacques Pépin's Table. In 1994 and 1996, Pépin and Julia Child appeared in 90 minute PBS specials, Cooking In Concert and More Cooking In Concert, filmed live before a Boston audience as part of the PBS annual fund drives for those years. In 1996, Pépin introduced his then 27-year-old daughter Claudine, in three television series and companion books: Cooking with Claudine, Encore with Claudine and Jacques Pépin Celebrates. Each of the three series earned the pair James Beard Foundation Awards. In 1999, Pépin teamed up with Julia Child for the series and companion book Jacques and Julia Cooking at Home. The TV series, produced by Susie Heller, won a Daytime Emmy Award and a James Beard Foundation Award. In 2003, Pépin published his autobiography, The Apprentice: My Life in the Kitchen.

== Later career ==
Pépin has toured and taught on cruise ships including the Queen Elizabeth 2, and the Crystal Cruises and Princess Cruises lines. In 2003, he was named the executive culinary director of Oceania Cruises, and "is credited with helping it achieve its reputation for culinary excellence and style".

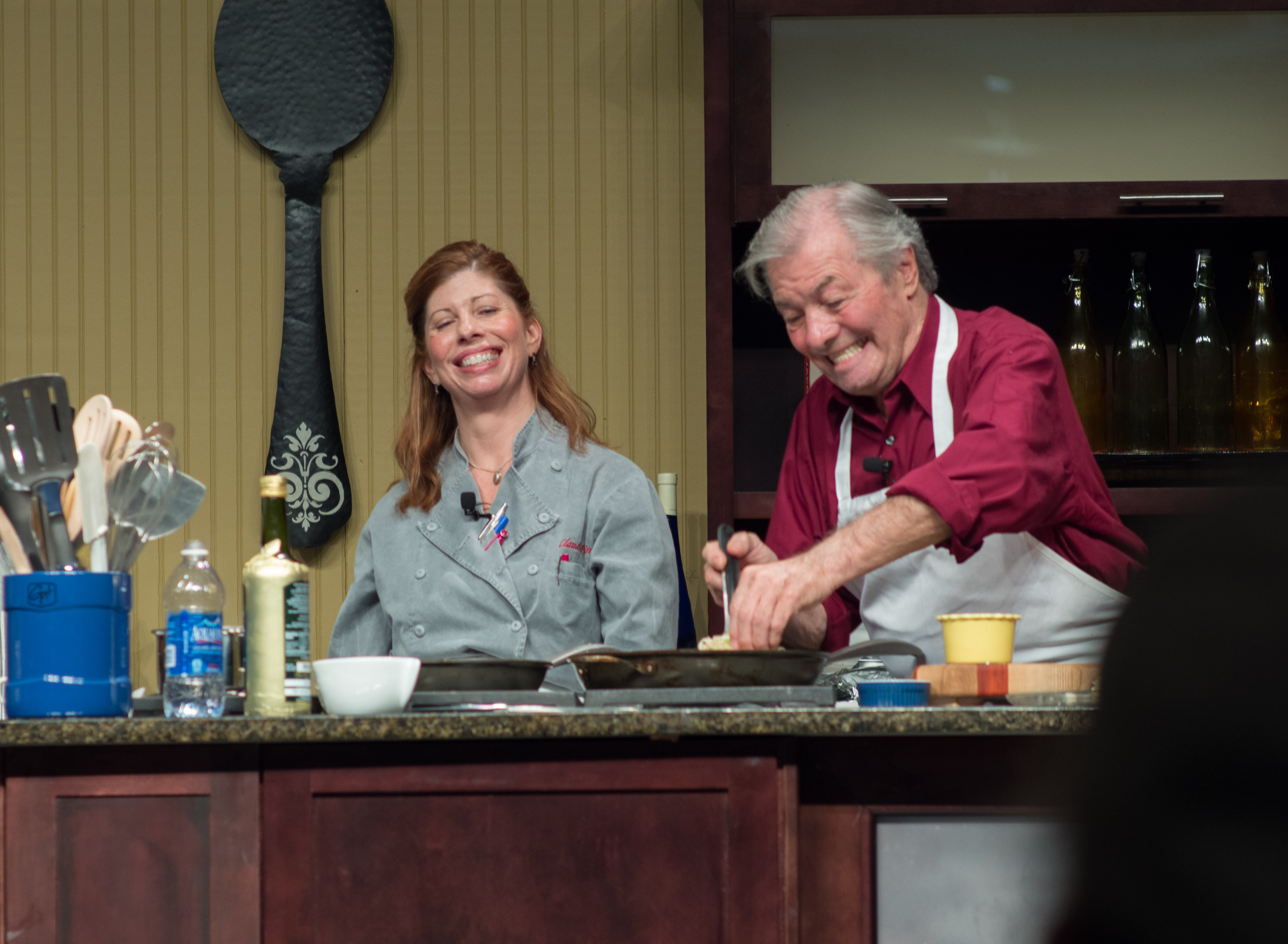
Claudine and Jacques Pépin at the Fabulous Food Show, 2012

Since his time as a student, Pépin has dabbled in and enjoyed drawing and painting. In recent years, he has committed more time to his art, and enjoyed some success with commercial sales on his art website and juried shows. In the first decade of the 2000s, Pépin published several more cookbooks including Fast Food My Way and More Fast Food My Way, which were paired with television series of the same name, produced by Tina Salter, and Chez Jacques: Traditions and Rituals of a Cook, that significantly featured Pépin's art. In 2011, Pépin filmed the series Essential Pépin at KQED studios and published a companion cookbook with more than 700 recipes and a set of technique-oriented videos. In 2012, he published New Complete Techniques, which combined and updated his important earlier works La Technique and La Méthode.

In 2015 Pépin, recovered at his home in Connecticut after suffering a minor stroke. He canceled his appearance at the annual International Association of Culinary Professionals conference in Washington D.C., but otherwise insisted on returning to his normal schedule, according to the Associated Press. "Oh my god, he made soup this morning", Pépin's daughter Claudine told the Associated Press. "I will do my best to lighten the load, but he's not of the mind to cancel anything. Honestly, he wanted to go to IACP. He's like, 'I'm talking. I can walk. Let's go.'"

In 2016, with his daughter Claudine and son-in-law Rollie Wesen, Jacques created his eponymous, non-profit, organization the Jacques Pépin Foundation (JPF):

The JPF advances Jacques Pépin’s love of culinary arts and education and supports the teaching of culinary skills through various channels to many communities. [It] supports community-based kitchens that offer culinary training to adults with high barriers to employment, including those impacted by the justice system, those experiencing homelessness, individuals in recovery, or those that have been underserved.

In 2017, Pépin published a cookbook with his granddaughter Shorey Wesen, entitled A Grandfather's Lessons. In the same year, Pépin received an honorary doctorate from the Columbia University School of General Studies. Pépin resided in Connecticut with his wife Gloria, until her death in 2020.

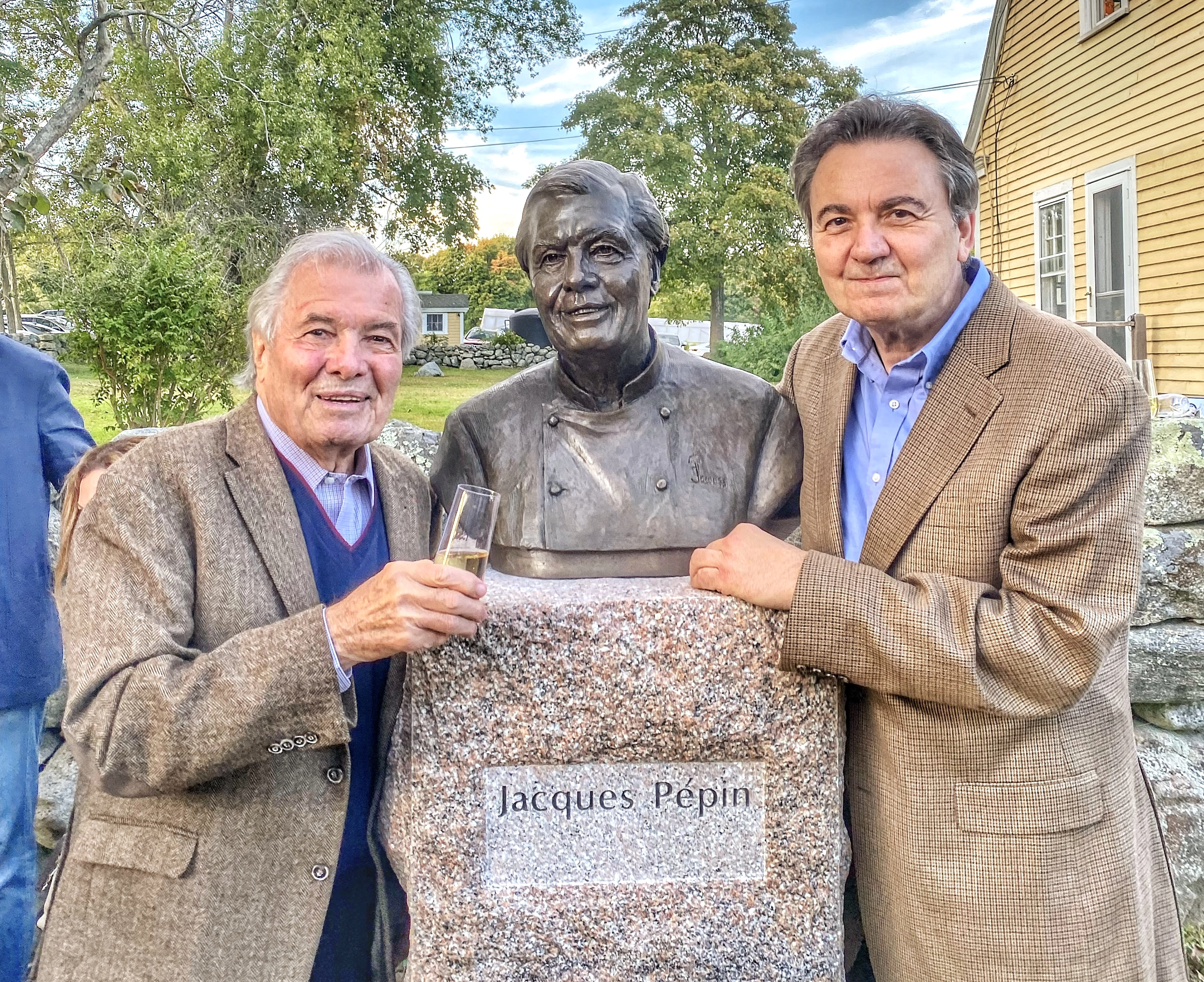
Jacques Pépín (left) with a bust in his likeness by sculptor Zenos Frudakis (right), 2019

== Television ==
The success of Pépin's book La Technique, used as a textbook for teaching the fundamentals of French cuisine, prompted him to launch a televised version resulting in a 1997 PBS series, The Complete Pépin. Relaunched on PBS ten years after its initial run, the series included a new introduction by Pépin where he stressed that the secret to being a successful chef and not a mere line cook lies in knowing and using the proper technique.

In 1999, Pépin co-starred in the PBS series Julia and Jacques Cooking at Home alongside Julia Child. The program was awarded a Daytime Emmy in 2001.

His show Jacques Pépin Fast Food My Way (based on his 2004 book of the same name) ran on PBS, and Jacques Pépin: More Fast Food My Way was broadcast on PBS' Create. In Essential Pépin (2011), Pépin brings modern touches to some of his favorite recipes from his career. In the 26-part public television series, Pépin demonstrates more than 125 dishes while the companion book, published by Houghton-Mifflin, contains more than 700 recipes.

Pépin was a guest judge on season five of the Bravo television show Top Chef, which aired in 2008. He was a guest on the television show Wahlburgers episode called "Pauli Day". Donnie Wahlberg arranged for Pépin to surprise his brother Paul Wahlberg for his birthday.

In 2015, his television series Jacques Pépin Heart & Soul began airing. The series premiered on KQED on September 12, 2015, and nationally on September 19.

A documentary about his life, Jacques Pépin: The Art of Craft, aired as part of the PBS series American Masters, premiering May 26, 2017. The film, narrated by Stanley Tucci, was produced and directed by Peter L. Stein, who had produced several of Pépin's early television cooking series at KQED in the 1990s.

In 2020, Jacques and KQED began filming "Cooking at Home" for release on YouTube.

== Awards and honors ==
In addition to the Daytime Emmy Award won with Julia Child, Pépin has received three of the French government's honors: He is a Chevalier de L'Ordre des Arts et des Lettres (1997) and a Chevalier de L'Ordre du Mérite Agricole (1992). In October 2004, he received France's Légion d'honneur. He has also received 24 James Beard Foundation awards.

On May 13, 2010, Pépin, along with other chefs from the French Culinary Institute (now known as the International Culinary Center), Alain Sailhac, Jacques Torres and André Soltner, prepared a $30,000-per-couple dinner for President Barack Obama's fund-raiser for the Democratic Congressional Campaign Committee at Manhattan's St. Regis Hotel.

On February 5, 2010, during the christening of MS Marina, Pépin was named an honorary commodore of the Oceania Cruises fleet, for which he serves as executive culinary director.

He received an honorary doctorate of Humane Letters from Boston University on May 22, 2011. In October 2011, Pépin was the recipient of the first tribute dinner at the New York Food and Wine Festival. In 2015, Pépin was the first recipient of the Julia Child Award from The Julia Child Foundation for Gastronomy and the Culinary Arts.

In May 2017, Pépin received an honorary doctorate of Humane Letters from Columbia University.

== Personal life ==
Pépin married Gloria Evelyn Augier in 1966, whom he met while working as a ski instructor. She died on December 5, 2020. They had one daughter, Claudine.

In 1974, Pépin was badly injured while driving on a country road after a deer leapt in front of his car. Despite swerving to avoid it, his car hit the deer, veered off the road and struck a telephone pole before crashing into a ravine, landing upside-down and catching on fire. He fractured 14 bones in his back, pelvis, and arms. His left arm was so badly injured that physicians initially wanted to amputate it. Pépin recovered, but his left shoulder remained limited in mobility and his left arm is several inches shorter than his right. In his autobiography, The Apprentice: My Life in the Kitchen, Pépin notes that his accident caused him to realize that he would not be able to continue working full-time as a chef/restaurateur; this realization motivated his reinvention as a teacher and author.

== Bibliography ==
- The Other Half of the Egg (1967) (with Helen McCully and William North Jayme)
- Jacques Pépin: A French Chef Cooks at Home (1975)
- La Technique (1976)
- La Methode (1979)
- Everyday Cooking With Jacques Pépin (1982)
- The Art of Cooking, Vol 1 (1987)
- The Art of Cooking, Vol 2 (1988)
- Short-Cut Cook (1990)
- Today's Gourmet (1991)
- Cuisine Economique (1992)
- Today's Gourmet II (1992)
- Jacques Pépin's Simple and Healthy Cooking (1994)
- Jacques Pépin's Table (1995)
- Jacques Pépin's Kitchen: Cooking with Claudine (1996)
- The Complete Pépin (1997)
- The French Culinary Institute's Salute to Healthy Cooking (1998) (with Alain Sailhac, Andre Soltner, and Jacques Torres)
- Jacques Pépin's Kitchen: Encore with Claudine (1998)
- Julia and Jacques: Cooking at Home (1999) (with Julia Child and David Nussbaum)
- Jacques Pépin Celebrates (2001)
- The Apprentice: My Life in the Kitchen (2003)
- Fast Food My Way (2004)
- Chez Jacques: Traditions and Rituals of a Cook (with Tom Hopkins, 2007)
- More Fast Food My Way (2008)
- Essential Pépin (2011)
- New Complete Techniques (2012)
- Jacques Pépin: Heart & Soul in the Kitchen (2015)
- A Grandfather's Lessons: In the Kitchen with Shorey (2017)
- Poulets & Légumes (2018)
- Jacques Pépin Quick & Simple (2020)
- Jacques Pépin Art of the Chicken: A Master Chef's Paintings, Stories, and Recipes of the Humble Bird (2022)
- Cooking My Way (2023)
- The Art of Jacques Pepin (2025)
- Complete Techniques (2026)
