= Alain Sailhac =

French chef (1935–2022)

Alain Pierre Sailhac (7 January 1936 – 1 December 2022) was a French chef working in New York City, where he was executive vice president and dean emeritus at The International Culinary Center, founded as the French Culinary Institute. Sailhac earned the first four-star rating from The New York Times while at Le Cygne in 1977. He went on to be a chef at Le Cirque, the 21 Club, and the Plaza Hotel.

== Culinary background ==
Sailhac, born in France on 7 January 1936, began his culinary career at age 14, working as an apprentice at the Capion restaurant in his small hometown of Millau, France. He worked in Paris, Corfu, Rhodes, and Guadeloupe before becoming sous chef at the Michelin Guide two-star Château de Larraldia. In New York City, beginning in 1965, Sailhac was chef de cuisine at Le Mistral and Le Manoir. Stints at several Paris hotels and restaurants and as executive chef at l'Hôtel Royal in New Caledonia and Le Perroquet in Chicago followed.

In 1974, Sailhac worked at Le Cygne, which during his tenure, received the coveted four stars from The New York Times in 1977. He was executive chef from 1978 through 1986 at the Le Cirque restaurant on Manhattan's Upper East Side, earning three stars in 1984 from The New York Times. Sailhac also was executive chef at the 21 Club, culinary director at the Plaza Hotel, and a consultant to the Regency Hotel. In 1991, Sailhac joined The French Culinary Institute as dean of culinary studies and was executive vice president and dean emeritus.

== Achievements ==
In 1984, Sailhac was welcomed into the world’s oldest savory culinary association: the Maîtres Cuisiniers de France (Master Chefs of France | MCF). In 1997, he received the MCF Silver Toque after being named Chef of the Year by the Maîtres Cuisiniers de France (Master Chefs of France).

Sailhac received the Silver Spoon Award with his wife, Arlene Feltman Sailhac, from Food Arts magazine in 2003. Also that year, he was the recipient of the 2003 James Beard Foundation "Who's Who of Food and Beverage in America. He also was the Chevalier du Mérite Agricole, and in 2004, he was presented France's Ordre National du Mérite.

Sailhac was a member of numerous culinary organizations, including the Maîtres Cuisiniers de France and the Société Culinaire Philanthropique.

In May 2010, Sailhac, along with other chefs from The French Culinary Institute (now known as The International Culinary Center), Jacques Pepin, Jacques Torres and André Soltner, prepared a $30,000-per-couple dinner for President Barack Obama's fund-raiser for the Democratic Congressional Campaign Committee at Manhattan's St. Regis Hotel.

== Death ==
Sailhac died in New York on 1 December 2022, at the age of 86.
