= Suzanne Goin =

American chef (born 1966)

- Born: September 25, 1966 (age 59); Los Angeles, California
- Occupations: Chef and cookbook writer

Suzanne Goin (born September 25, 1966) is an American chef and restaurateur from Los Angeles, California. She was named one of Food & Wine magazine's "best new chefs of 1999" and won a James Beard Award for Outstanding Chef in 2016. In 2006, Goin won the Beard Award for Best Chef: California and one for her cookbook, Sunday Suppers at Lucques.

== Career ==
When Goin was a high school senior at Marlborough School in Los Angeles, she interned at Ma Maison restaurant just after the departure of Wolfgang Puck. After graduation, she enrolled in Brown University where she graduated with honors. Goin then worked at a series of restaurants, including Alice Waters' Chez Panisse and Todd English's Olives. In the early 1990s, she traveled to France. She worked with Alain Passard at his three Michelin-star L'Arpège, along with stints at Didier Oudill's two-star Pain and Patisserie Christian Pottier. After returning to Los Angeles in 1995, she spent two years at Mark Peel’s restaurant Campanile ending up as executive chef. Goin has won or been nominated for a total of 11 James Beard Foundation Awards.

== Restaurants ==
In 1998, Suzanne Goin opened Lucques, which was recognized by Food & Wine and Gourmet magazines. In 2002, she opened A.O.C., which won 3 stars from the Los Angeles Times. Her third restaurant, Tavern, opened in 2009. In 2021, Goin opened two new restaurants at the Proper Hotel in Downtown Los Angeles, Caldo Verde and Cara Cara.

== Media ==
Goin's cookbook, Sunday Suppers at Lucques, was published in late 2005. The next year the book received the James Beard Foundation's award for "Best Cookbook From a Professional Viewpoint." She has also made several television appearances including PBS's series Chef's Story and New York Times food critic Mark Bittman's How to Cook Everything, and as a guest judge on Top Chef: Los Angeles.
