= Jacques Torres =

French pastry chef (born 1959)

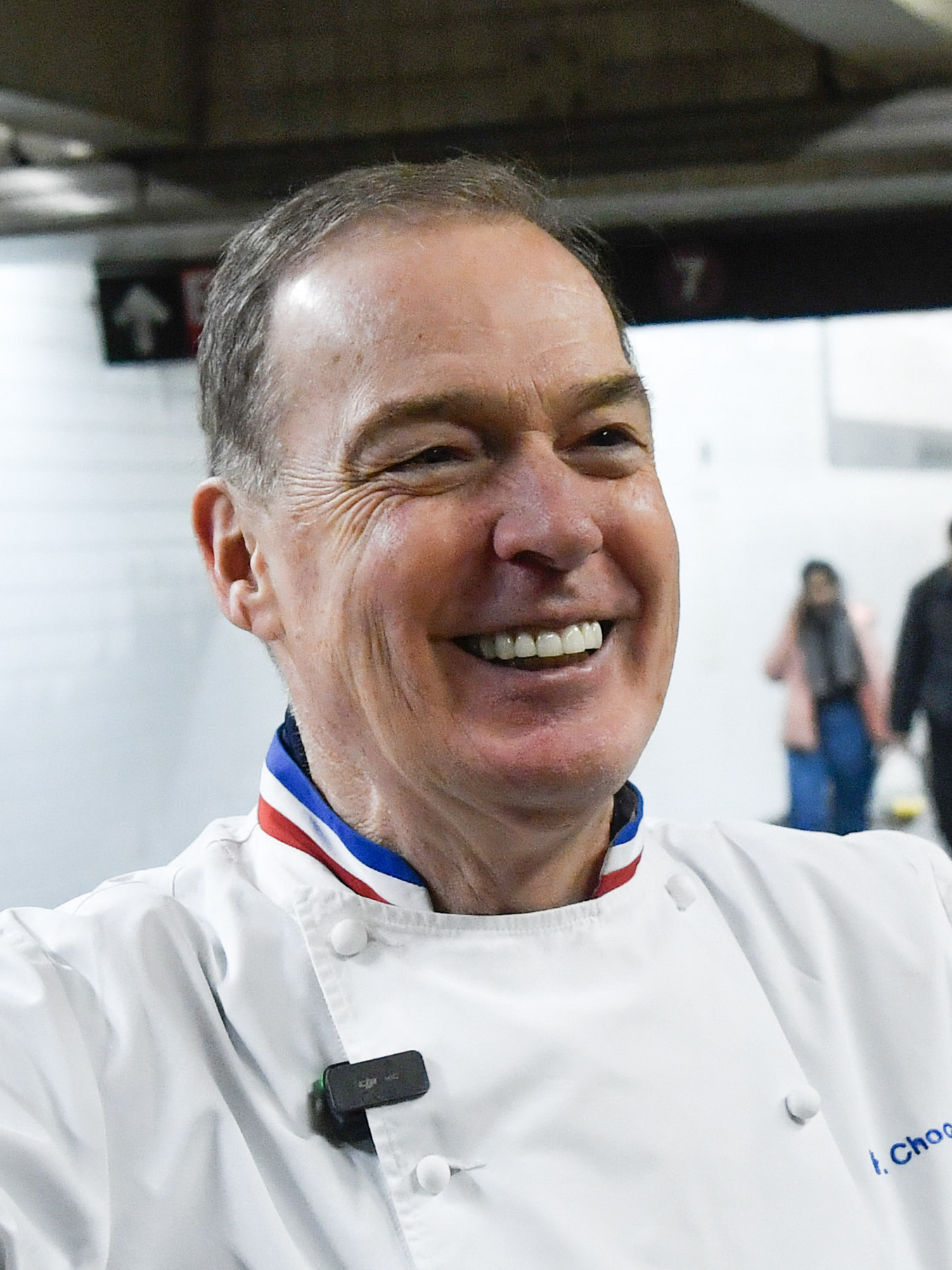
- Torres in 2025
- Born: 14 June 1959 (age 67); Algiers, French Algeria
- Spouse: Hasty Khoei (after 2007)
- Culinary career
- Current restaurants
- Madame Chocolat, Beverly Hills, California
- Television shows
- Dessert Circus with Jacques Torres (began 1998); Chocolate with Jacques Torres (began 2002); Passion for Chocolate with Jacques Torres (2003); Passion for Pastry with Jacques Torres; Next Great Baker (2014); Nailed It! (2018–2022); Nailed It! Holiday! (2018–2019)

Jacques Torres (born 14 June 1959) is a French pastry chef and chocolatier based in New York. Torres is a member of the International Culinary Center community as Dean of Pastry Arts, as well as holding pastry demonstrations. He appears on the show Nailed It!.

== Biography ==
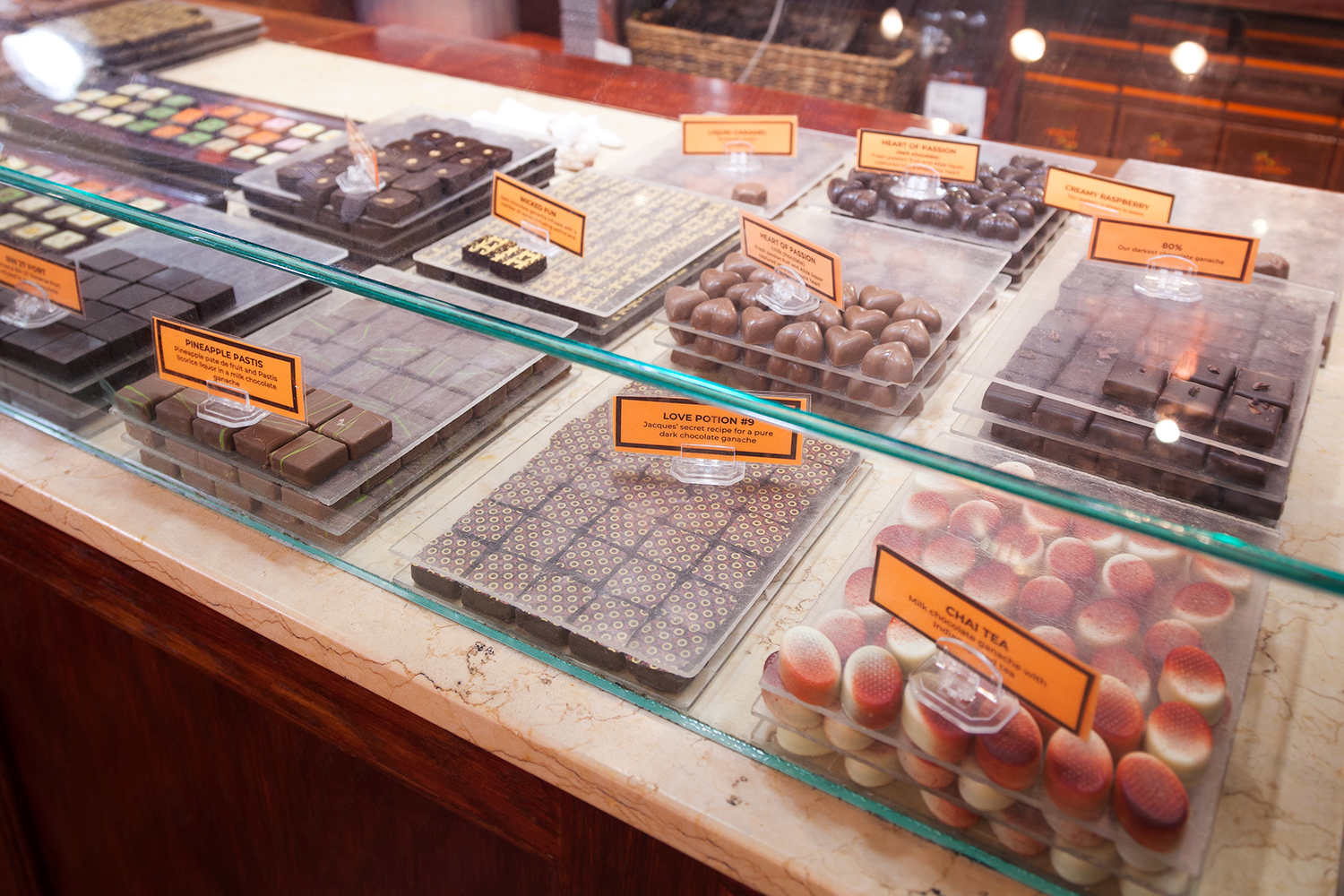
Counter display at Jacques Torres Chocolate store

Torres was born in Algiers and grew up in Bandol, a fishing village in the South of France. When Torres was 15 years old, he began an apprenticeship at a small pastry shop and completed his apprenticeship requirements in two years, graduating first in his class. In 1980 he began working with two-star Michelin chef Jacques Maximin at the Hotel Negresco. During that time, Torres also attended culinary school to earn a Master Pastry Chef degree. Next, he taught pastry courses at a culinary school in Cannes from 1983 to 1986. In 1986, Torres was the youngest person ever to win the Meilleur Ouvrier Pâtissier de France competition.

Torres moved to the United States, and in 1988 he served as the Corporate Pastry Chef for the Ritz Carlton Hotel Company before moving on to Le Cirque, where he worked for 11 years as Executive Pastry Chef. Torres joined the faculty of the International Culinary Center in 1993, and after designing the Classic Pastry Arts Curriculum in 1996, he became the school's Dean of Pastry Arts. In 2000, Torres left Le Cirque to open a chocolate factory and retail shop in Brooklyn, New York. Currently, there are eight Jacques Torres shops, including one chocolate factory in the Brooklyn Army Terminal and an ice cream shop in Grand Central Terminal. In March 2017 Jacques opened New York City's first chocolate museum, named Choco-Story New York. The 5,000-square-foot (460 m^{2}) museum opened at the site of his flagship store in Manhattan.

In 2007, Torres married chocolatier Hasty Khoei, who formerly worked under Torres in his chocolate factory. Khoei owned a chocolate shop, Madame Chocolat, in Beverly Hills, California. Their son, Pierre, was born on August 19, 2016. Their daughter, Jacqueline, was born on April 5, 2019. The family currently resides in New York City.

Torres appeared as a judge on Season 4 of Next Great Baker, and is a judge and co-host on the cooking comedy show Nailed It! alongside Nicole Byer.

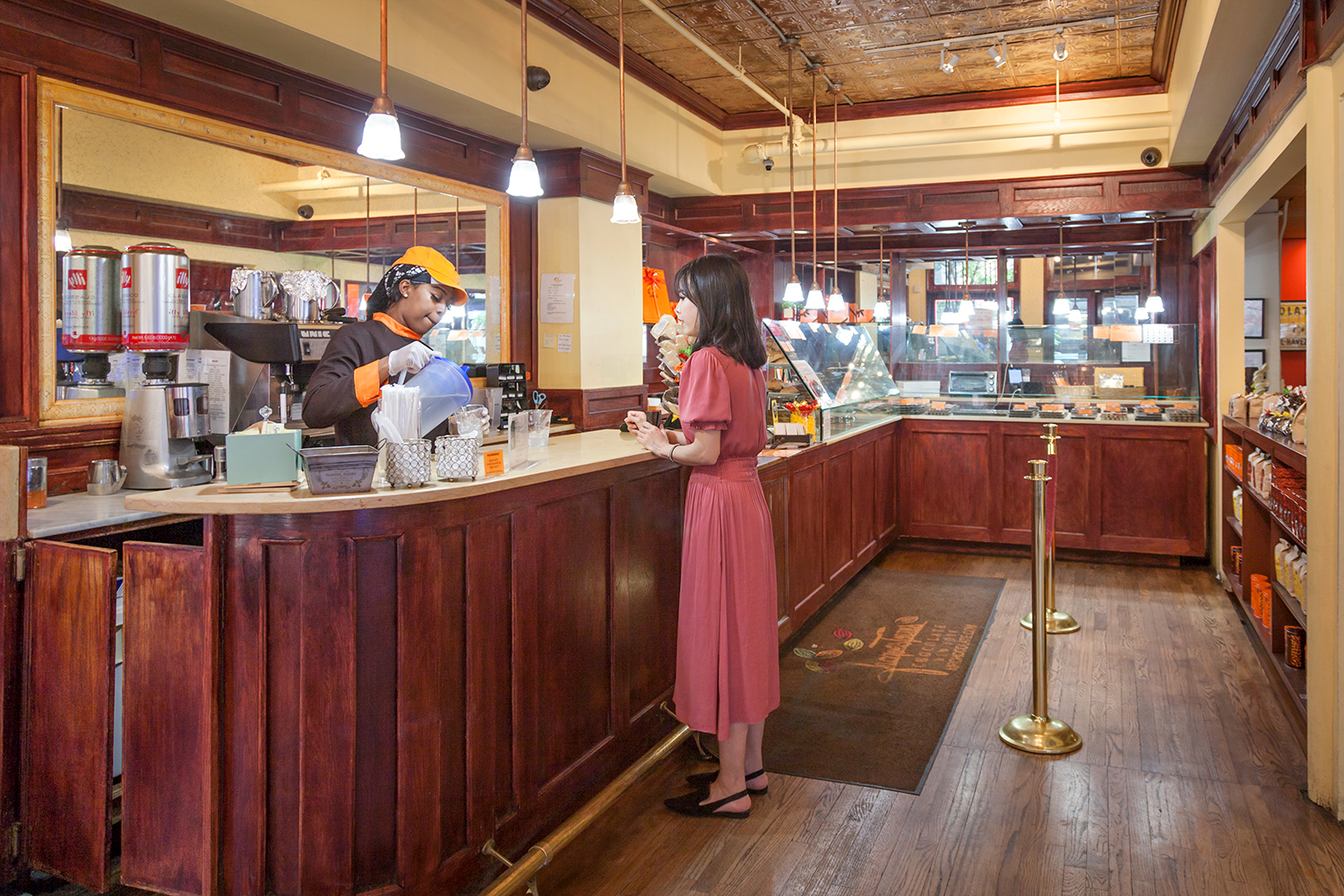
Jacques Torres Chocolate store in Brooklyn

== Achievements ==
Torres's awards include the James Beard Foundation Pastry Chef of the Year, Meilleur Ouvrier de France, the Chefs of America Pastry Chef of the Year, and Chartreuse Pastry Chef of the Year. He is a member of the Académie Culinaire de France, and in 2003 the James Beard Foundation inducted him into the Who's Who of Food and Beverage in America. Torres is the author of two Dessert Circus books, and the host of the Food Network TV show Chocolate with Jacques Torres. In 2004 he opened his chocolate factory and second retail location in Manhattan, Jacques Torres Chocolate Haven. On May 13, 2010, Torres, along with culinary chefs from the French Culinary Institute (now known as The International Culinary Center), Jacques Pepin, Alain Sailhac and André Soltner, prepared a $30,000-per-couple dinner for U.S. President Barack Obama's fund-raiser for the Democratic Congressional Campaign Committee at Manhattan's St. Regis Hotel.

== Chocolate with Jacques Torres ==
Chocolate with Jacques Torres is a North American television cooking show hosted by Jacques Torres. It premiered in on the Food Network in 2002. The show was taped in the United States and France, occasionally in Torres's home region of Provence. Its primary focus is on extravagant chocolate-based desserts, including chocolate sculptures, centerpieces, and other edible artwork. Torres often describes techniques viewers can use to make their own at home.
