= Andre Surmain =

French restaurateur (1920–2018)

Andre Surmain, at Lutèce,

Andre Surmain (December 5, 1920, Cairo - January 31, 2018, Saint-Paul-en-Forêt, France) was a restaurateur who opened Lutèce in 1961.

He announced his retirement in 1973 at age 52, selling Lutèce to its chef André Soltner. Surmain went on to open other restaurants - Fuc y Fum in Majorca, Spain, the Relais a Mougins, in Mougins, near Cannes, France, and its shorter-lived sister, also named the Relais a Mougins, in Palm Beach, Florida.

== Early life ==
Surmain was born Andre Sussman to the former Nina Ratzkovski, a chemist, and Richard Sussman, whose father's family were jewelers to the viceroy of Egypt. The couple also owned Aziza Cosmetics. Prior to the Battle of Normandy in 1944, he “changed his surname to Surmain, fearing that the name Sussman might give him away as Jewish if he were caught by the Nazis.”

He was educated at Lycée Janson de Sailly in Paris and the French artillery school in Fontainebleau. He served in the French Army until 1940 when he emigrated to the United States. Drafted by the American military, he was sent back to Europe by the Office of Strategic Services.

== Family ==
After his death, he was survived by his fourth wife, the former Patricia Terno, two sons and a daughter, two sisters, 14 grandchildren and five great-grandchildren. He was predeceased by daughter, Ghislaine Surmain, who died in 2017.
