= Lanfranco Rasponi =

Italian author, critic, and publicist

- Lanfranco Rasponi (center) with Lillian Gish and Ramon Novarro at the Sagittarius Gallery Fabrizio Clerici exhibition in 1955
- Born: Lanfranco Dwight Rasponi Dalle Teste; 11 December 1914; Florence, Italy
- Died: 9 April 1983 (aged 68); Rio de Janeiro, Brazil
- Occupations: writer; publicist

Lanfranco Rasponi (11 December 1914 – 9 April 1983) was an Italian author, critic, and publicist. He is primarily known for his writing on opera and opera singers, especially his 1982 book, The Last Prima Donnas. Born in Florence, he was the son of an Italian aristocrat and an American mother. From the late 1940s to the early 1960s Rasponi was the publicity agent for many opera singers as well as for socialites and fashionable restaurants in New York City. For a while, he also owned the Sagittarius Gallery in Manhattan which specialised in introducing contemporary European artists. After a financial scandal in 1963, he left the United States for Italy and dedicated himself to writing. He spent his last years in Rio de Janeiro where he died at the age of 68.

== Life and career ==
Rasponi was born in Florence, the son of Count Nerino Rasponi Dalle Teste and Caroline Montague, the daughter of a successful businessman in Chattanooga, Tennessee and divided his youth between Italy and the United States. He received a BA in English from the University of California Berkeley, which he attended on an exchange scholarship, and then an MA from the Columbia School of Journalism in 1937, after which he began writing articles and reviews for the New York Times and Opera News. With the outbreak of World War II, he was briefly interned as an "enemy alien", but was paroled and then removed completely from his parole restrictions when he was drafted into the US Army and stationed at Fort Lewis in Washington State.

After the war, he resumed his career as a music journalist and also began working for the public relations firm Hope Associates which handled publicity for the Metropolitan Opera. Then in 1948 he and Frank Chapman, a former opera singer and the husband of Gladys Swarthout, formed the public relations firm Chapman–Rasponi. However, they soon fell out and Rasponi opened his own firm, Rasponi Associates. His first two clients were the opera singer Licia Albanese and the cosmetics tycoon Elizabeth Arden. He soon added other opera singers, including Renata Tebaldi, Franco Corelli, and Cesare Siepi, as well as the fashionable New York restaurants Quo Vadis and The Colony. In 1955 Rasponi opened the Sagittarius Gallery in Manhattan as a sideline and travelled to Europe seeking out the work of artists to sell there. Artists whose work was exhibited at the gallery included Fabrizio Clerici, Horst (an old friend of Rasponi's from his army days), Cecil Beaton, and Don Bachardy. Bachardy's lover, Christopher Isherwood, was less than impressed with Rasponi who he felt had been dismissive of Bachardy's work despite the exhibition. He wrote in his diary after the opening of Bachardy's show: "He [Rasponi] is surprisingly undistinguished, prissy and languid and clerklike, like some unpleasant official at a passport office."

As a publicity agent, Rasponi also had a clientele of established New York socialites and aspiring ones. Amongst these were Ann Woodward, the wife of William Woodward; (Note: Ann Woodward was a former model and showgirl who later shot and killed her husband William Woodward, Jr.) Peggy Bancroft, the wife of William Woodward's nephew Thomas Bancroft; (Note: Peggy later divorced Thomas Bancroft to marry Prince Charles d'Arenberg.) the banker Mary Roebling; and Rosetta Valenti who organized lavish charity balls in aid of her Renaissance for Italian Youth Foundation. Sam Aldrich, (Note: Sam Aldrich was the son of Winthrop W. Aldrich.) who worked with Peggy Bancroft on one of her charity events, described meeting Rasponi for the first time: "Her escort was a nice-smelling, polished, pomaded young man with an obsequious air, a smooth Italian accent, and a clipboard." Rasponi's association with Rosetta Valenti proved to be his undoing as a publicist. In 1963 Valenti's foundation was dissolved by the New York Supreme Court after charges were brought by the state's attorney general that the actual beneficiaries of her charity balls were herself, Rasponi, and others who helped her promote the events. Rasponi closed his public relations firm and left for Italy, never again to work in the United States.

In the late 1960s, he published two books on the life of the jet set, The International Nomads and The Golden Oases, which featured many of Rasponi's friends and clients from his New York days. He then worked on what was to prove his most enduring book, The Last Prima Donnas, a 636-page exposition on 55 great women singers of the past whom he knew and had interviewed during his time New York and later in Europe. He spent the last years of his life in Rio de Janeiro because, he said, the city was "so soothing." From there he wrote reviews of Brazilian opera and ballet productions for Opera News and co-wrote Dorothy Kirsten's autobiography. A Time to Sing. His final book, The Last Prima Donnas, was published a few months before his death in Rio at the age of 68. He never married and was the last of the Rasponi Dalle Teste line. In 1977 he had sold the family's 17th-century palazzo in Ravenna to the city, where it has been since restored and opened to the public.

== Books ==
- The International Nomads, 1966, Putnam (also published in Italian as I nomadi internazionali, 1967)
- The Golden Oases, 1968, Putnam
- The Last Prima Donnas, 1982, Alfred A. Knopf
