= Pierre Franey =

French-American chef (1921–1996)

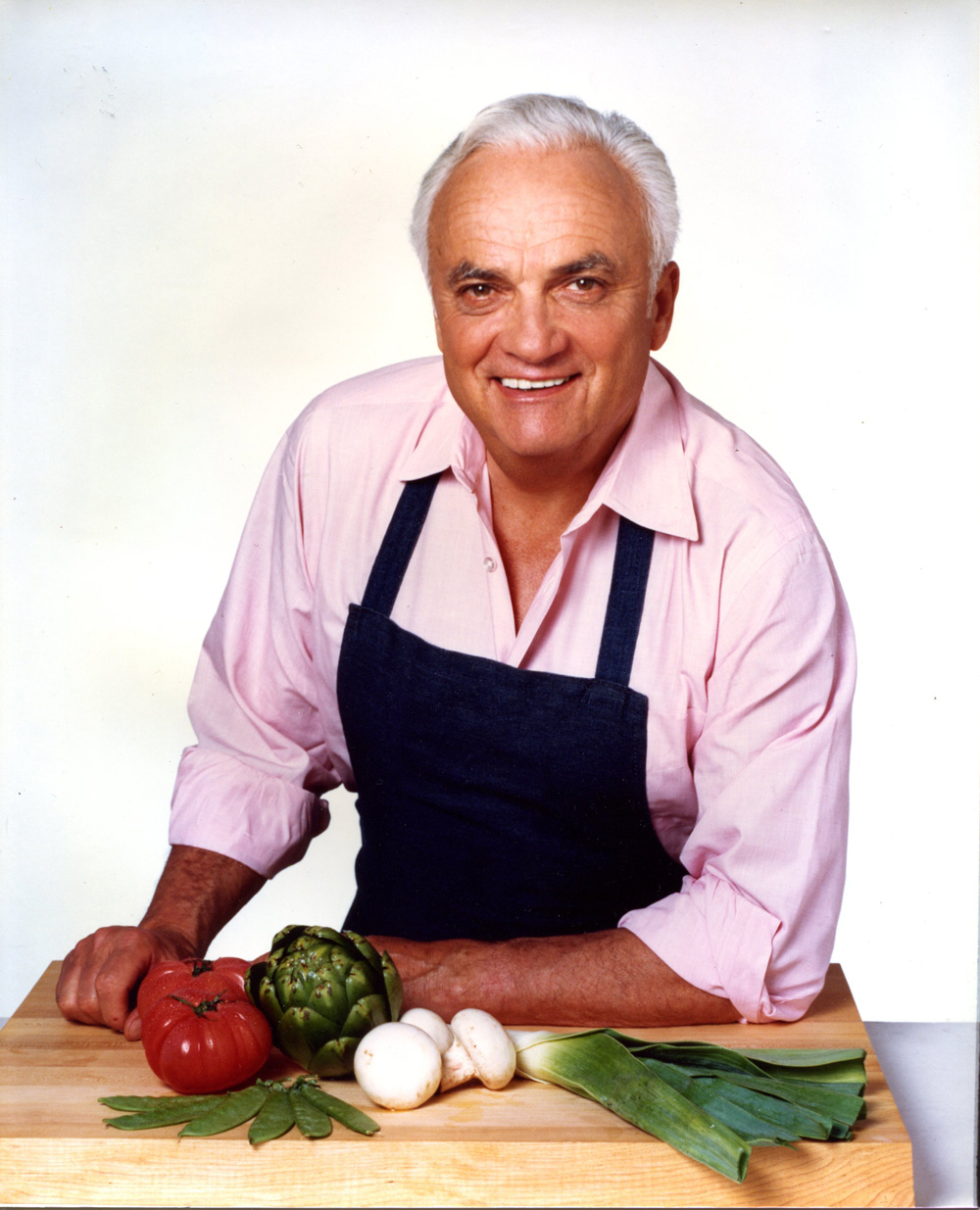
- Pierre Franey on the set of his TV show Cuisine Rapide
- Born: January 13, 1921; Saint Vinnemer, Yonne, France
- Died: 15 October 1996 (aged 75); Southampton, England
- Culinary career
- Cooking style: French
- Television shows
- Cuisine Rapide; Cooking in America; Cooking in France; Cooking in Europe
- Award
- James Beard Award for Best National Cooking Show in 1995
- Website: www.pierrefraney.com

Pierre Franey (January 13, 1921 – October 15, 1996) was a French-born American chef, best known for his televised cooking shows and his "60 Minute Gourmet" column in The New York Times.

== Early years ==
Franey grew up in northern Burgundy, France. As a young man, he was in the United States at the outbreak of World War II, cooking in the French Pavilion at the 1939 New York World's Fair, and remained in New York rather than returning to Occupied France. He turned down an offer to become the cook for Douglas MacArthur. Franey served as a machine gunner in the U.S. Army.

== Le Pavillon ==
After the war, Henri Soulé, who ran the French Pavilion's kitchen, re-opened Le Pavillon in New York City, and Franey became executive chef in 1952. Franey, along with Jacques Pépin, then an aspiring young cook on the staff of Le Pavillon, was hired in 1960 by the hotel and restaurant entrepreneur Howard Johnson, Sr., (a regular client at Le Pavillon) to revamp some of the Howard Johnson's restaurant chain's recipes. The nine to five, week-day job allowed Pierre to spend more time with his family and collaborate with New York Times food writer Craig Claiborne on weekends, often in East Hampton, NY, creating recipes for The New York Times as well as assisting with restaurant reviews.

== 60-Minute Gourmet and The New York Times ==
Over a twenty-year collaboration, Claiborne and Franey wrote weekly food articles, restaurant reviews and Sunday Magazine recipes for The Times and co-authored ten books. In 1975, Pierre moved on from Howard Johnson's to begin his own syndicated byline, “The 60 Minute Gourmet," for the new “Living" (now Dining) section of The New York Times. His widely read column, which appeared in over 360 newspapers worldwide, led to a second column entitled “Kitchen Equipment," which also appeared in the Times' Living section.

Franey and Claiborne made international headlines in 1975 when Claiborne won a Public Television fundraiser sponsored by American Express for dinner for two with an unlimited budget at any restaurant in the world. Choosing a "small but ruinously expensive" restaurant in Paris called Chez Denis, the two ate and drank their way through thirty-one courses. The check for the single, four-hour meal totaled over $4,000 including taxes and tip, creating considerable controversy in the press.

== Television shows ==
In 1989, Franey launched his national television career on public television with a cooking series titled Cuisine Rapide. Quickly becoming a hit, the series led to a companion book of the same title, followed by additional shows including Cooking in America and Cooking in France, which won the James Beard Foundation Award for the best cooking show in 1995, and finally Cooking in Europe.

== Bibliography ==
In 1994, along with colleagues from The New York Times, Richard Flaste and Bryan Miller, Franey wrote his memoir A Chef's Tale, interweaving his personal story with his passion for food, memorable meals, and favorite recipes. Franey authored or co-authored an additional 15 cookbooks including The 'New' New York Times Cookbook and The 60-Minute Gourmet. His final book, Pierre Franey Cooks With His Friends, was co-written in 1996 with his eldest daughter, Claudia Franey Jensen, as a companion to his public television series Cooking in Europe. The book was nominated for a James Beard Foundation Award that year.

- A Chef's Tale (Memoir)
- 60-Minute Gourmet
- More 60-Minute Gourmet
- Cooking with the 60-Minute Gourmet
- The New New York Times Cookbook
- Classic French Cooking - Foods of the World
- Veal Cookery - Craig Claiborne and Pierre Franey
- The Seafood Cookbook - From Classic to Contemporary
- Pierre Franey's Kitchen
- Cooking with Craig Claiborne and Pierre Franey
- Pierre Franey's Low-Calorie Gourmet
- Craig Claiborne's Gourmet Diet
- Cuisine Rapide
- Pierre Franey's Cooking in America
- Pierre Franey's Cooking in France
- Pierre Franey Cooks with his Friends

== Awards and honors ==
Decorated several times by the French government, including the National Merite of France, Franey held an honorary doctorate from Johnson & Wales University, served on the boards of the Culinary Institute of America and Johnson & Wales University, and was a past president of The Vatel Club, a French food industry organization founded in 1913 in New York. He was honored by the March of Dimes in 1985 with a Hirschfeld caricature drawing for his extensive fundraising work for that organization.

== Last years and legacy ==
Franey died in 1996 shortly after suffering a stroke while giving a shipboard cooking demonstration aboard the Cunard ocean liner, Queen Elizabeth 2. He is buried in Green River Cemetery in Springs, East Hampton, on Long Island. He was survived by his wife, Betty, and three children, Claudia, Diane, and Jacques. Scholarships are bequeathed in his honor at Johnson & Wales University in Providence, Rhode Island, and The Culinary Institute of America in Hyde Park, New York.
