= La Caravelle (New York City) =

Former restaurant in Manhattan, New York

- The restaurant in 2004, shortly before closing.

- Location in Manhattan La Caravelle (New York City) La Caravelle (New York)
- Address: 33 West 55th Street; New York City
- Coordinates: 40°45′45″N 73°58′35″W
- Owner: Fred Decré and Robert Meyzen (original)

Construction
- Opened: September 21, 1960
- Closed: May 22, 2004

La Caravelle was a restaurant in New York City, specializing in French cuisine. It opened on September 21, 1960, at 33 West 55th Street in Manhattan. The restaurant was established by Fred Decré and Robert Meyzen, with Roger Fessaguet as head chef, and took its name from the type of sailing ships Christopher Columbus sailed on his voyages to the New World. Like most European restaurants, La Caravelle had a menu that changed daily. This made the restaurant popular with new customers and also brought them back regularly. Salvador Dalí, John Lindsay, Leland Hayward, Walter Cronkite and Dorothy Kilgallen often dined at the restaurant in its early years. President John F. Kennedy was especially fond of La Caravelle's vichyssoise and chicken in champagne sauce, and he often requested them as takeout orders to eat on the plane while traveling.

Twenty years after its opening, chef Roger Fessaguet left the kitchen to become an owner with Meyzen due to the retirement of Fred Decré. In 1984, Robert Meyzen retired and Fessaguet and André Jammet took over ownership of the restaurant. The following year, a New York Magazine article cited it as one of the best restaurants in New York City, and mentioned that most guidebooks gave it their highest rating. Fessaguet retired in 1988, leaving ownership with Jammet and his wife. The Jammets redecorated La Caravelle in 1990, replacing the original red carpets and banquettes with a color scheme of green and peach. Artist Nina Duran was hired to create a small mural for the restaurant's foyer. The restaurant closed on May 22, 2004, despite garnering the James Beard Foundation's Most Outstanding Restaurant in the Country award in the same year. The name is now known for champagnes produced by the Jammets; the restaurant began serving them as its house brand in 1997.

== History ==
The restaurant was originally owned by Fred Decré and Robert Meyzen, with Roger Fessaguet as head chef. Decré and Meyzen, maîtres d’hôtel at Le Pavillon, left there to open the restaurant in midtown Manhattan's Shoreham Hotel, hiring Fessaquet, who also worked at Le Pavillon, as its first executive chef. The restaurant's name was taken from the type of sailing ships Christopher Columbus sailed on his voyages to the New World and represented their hopes for a new beginning in the restaurant business with its opening. Artist Jean Pagès was hired to create a series of murals depicting typical Parisian scenes for the space that was a speakeasy during the Prohibition era. Pagès added to the restaurant's murals in the 1960s; his work was accidentally altered by fellow artist Salvador Dalí when Dali scratched one of the murals with his cane while dining there with friends.

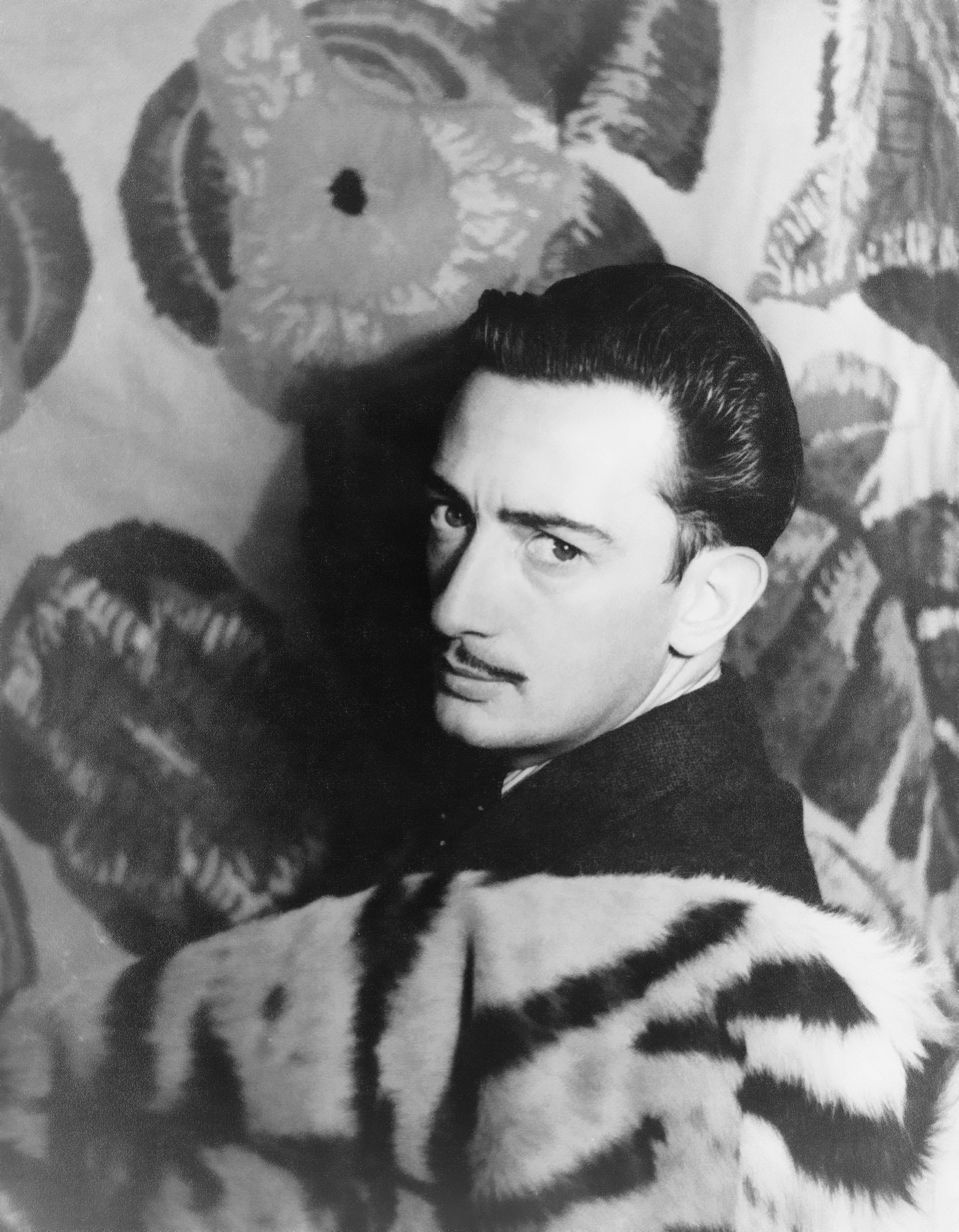
Salvador Dalí

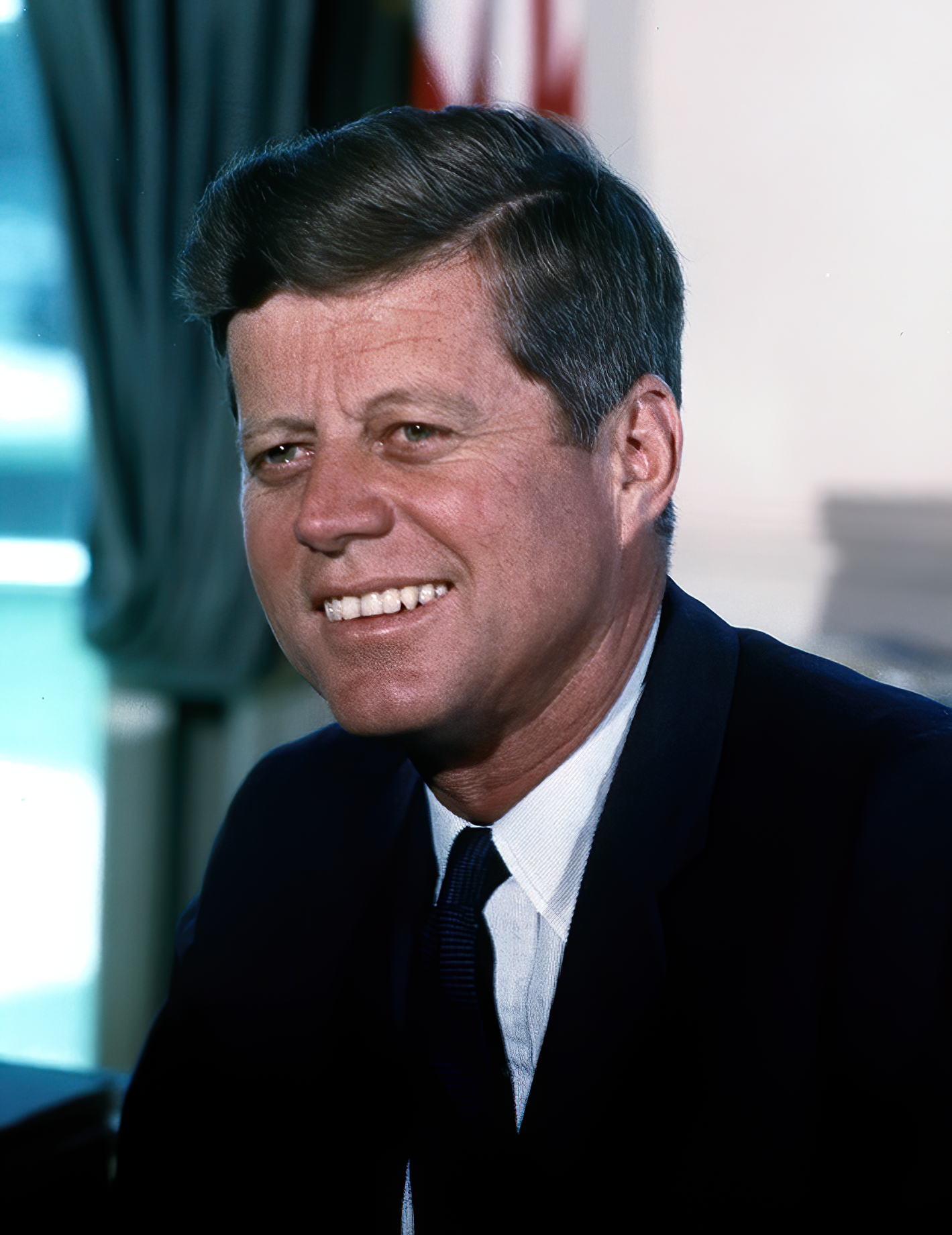
John F. Kennedy

Like most European restaurants, La Caravelle had a menu that changed daily. This made the restaurant popular with new customers and also brought them back regularly. Salvador Dalí, John Lindsay, Leland Hayward and Dorothy Kilgallen often dined at the restaurant in its early years. The journalist and broadcaster Walter Cronkite was a regular visitor to La Caravelle and enjoyed eating pike quenelles in lobster cream sauce. Other frequent visitors included the Duke and Duchess of Windsor and Marlene Dietrich.

Joseph P. Kennedy had been a patron of Le Pavillon, but after Decré and Meyzen opened their new restaurant, Kennedy switched his patronage to La Caravelle, dining there regularly when in New York. It became a popular place for the Kennedy family to visit. Fessaguet chose and trained René Verdon to be chef at the White House when John F. Kennedy was elected president the year after opening. Verdon spent some weeks working with Fessaquet on the Kennedy family's favorite dishes. (Note: At the White House, Verdon grew his own vegetables in a roof garden and was able to have herbs planted in the flower beds of the East Garden. He left the job during the Johnson Administration because of his differences with Johnson about the type and quality of the food to be served. Verdon eventually relocated to San Francisco, where he was the owner of the Le Trianon restaurant in the 1970s and 1980s.) President Kennedy was especially fond of La Caravelle's vichyssoise and chicken in champagne sauce. He often requested them as "take out" orders and would have them heated up on the plane as he traveled. Decré and Meyzen renamed the dish on their menu; Poularde Maison Blanch then became "White House Chicken". In 1964, the Kennedys held a family reunion at La Caravelle; one of the subjects of discussion at the reunion was said to be whether Robert F. Kennedy should ask to be nominated as vice president at the upcoming 1964 Democratic National Convention. Joseph P. Kennedy was in attendance and walked into the restaurant with the aid of a cane. (Note: While the news story lists Joseph P. Kennedy as a financial backer of La Caravelle, he was only a regular patron of the restaurant, having no financial interest in it.)

== Lunch preparation at La Caravelle ==
By 7:30 a.m., head chef Fessaguet had decided on the day's lunch menu, estimated the number of diners La Caravelle would have and ordered the provisions for it. An hour later, the fresh vegetables were being peeled and sliced and the various sauces were on the stoves. The restaurant's pastry chef began his work on the various pastries and desserts for the day's lunch; the lunch preparations were completed and the kitchen staff could sit down for lunch. By noon, the waiters had donned their uniforms and the prepared food was on silver trays on a kitchen table. At 12:45, the orders for the day's luncheon guests began coming into the kitchen; by 2 p.m., 92 patrons had been served.

In 1967, La Caravelle's preparations for lunch were the subject of a short film, French Lunch, which shows the preparation in the kitchen of an entire meal seating.

== Management and cuisine changes ==
Twenty years after its opening, chef Roger Fessaguet left the kitchen to become an owner with Meyzen due to the retirement of Fred Decré. In 1984, Robert Meyzen retired and Fessaguet and André Jammet took over ownership of the restaurant. The following year, a New York Magazine article cited it as one of the best restaurants in New York City, and mentioned that most guidebooks gave it their highest rating. Fessaguet retired in 1988, leaving ownership with Jammet and his wife. The Jammets redecorated La Caravelle in 1990, replacing the original red carpets and banquettes with a color scheme of green and peach. Artist Nina Duran was hired to create a smaller mural for the restaurant's foyer.

Beginning in 2001, the Jammets started replacing many of the dishes La Caravelle was noted for with updated cuisine they described as more pleasing to the "contemporary palate". Some of the old favorite selections were relegated to a menu section labeled "Les Classiques", which became the minority of the offerings. The couple decided not to renew the restaurant's lease and it was closed in 2004.

== Last night of business ==
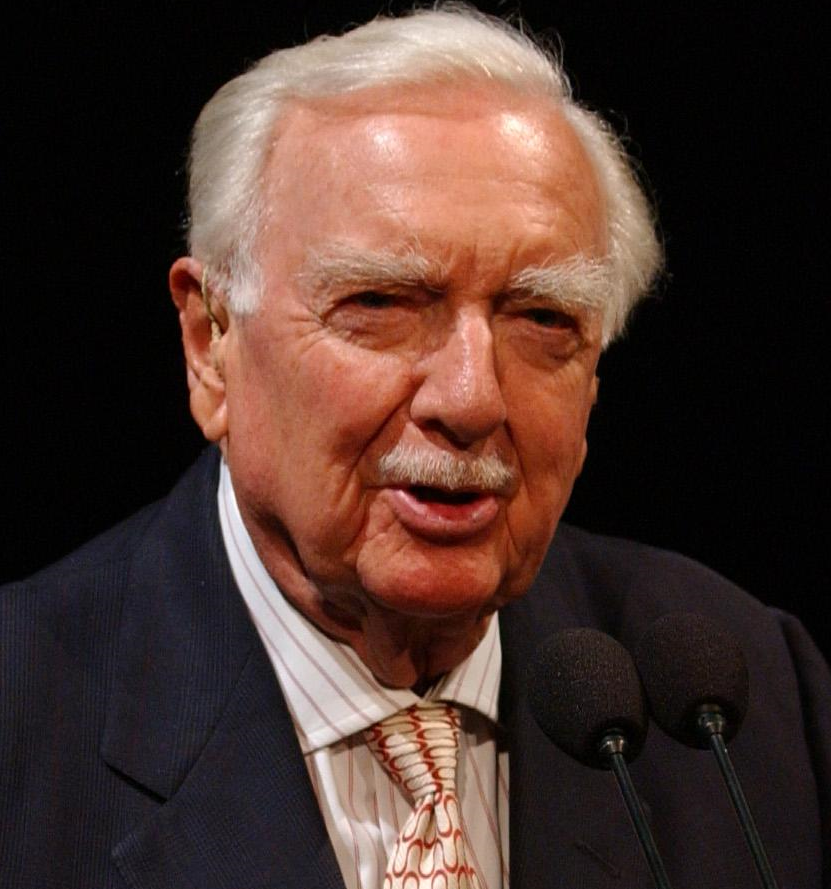
Walter Cronkite

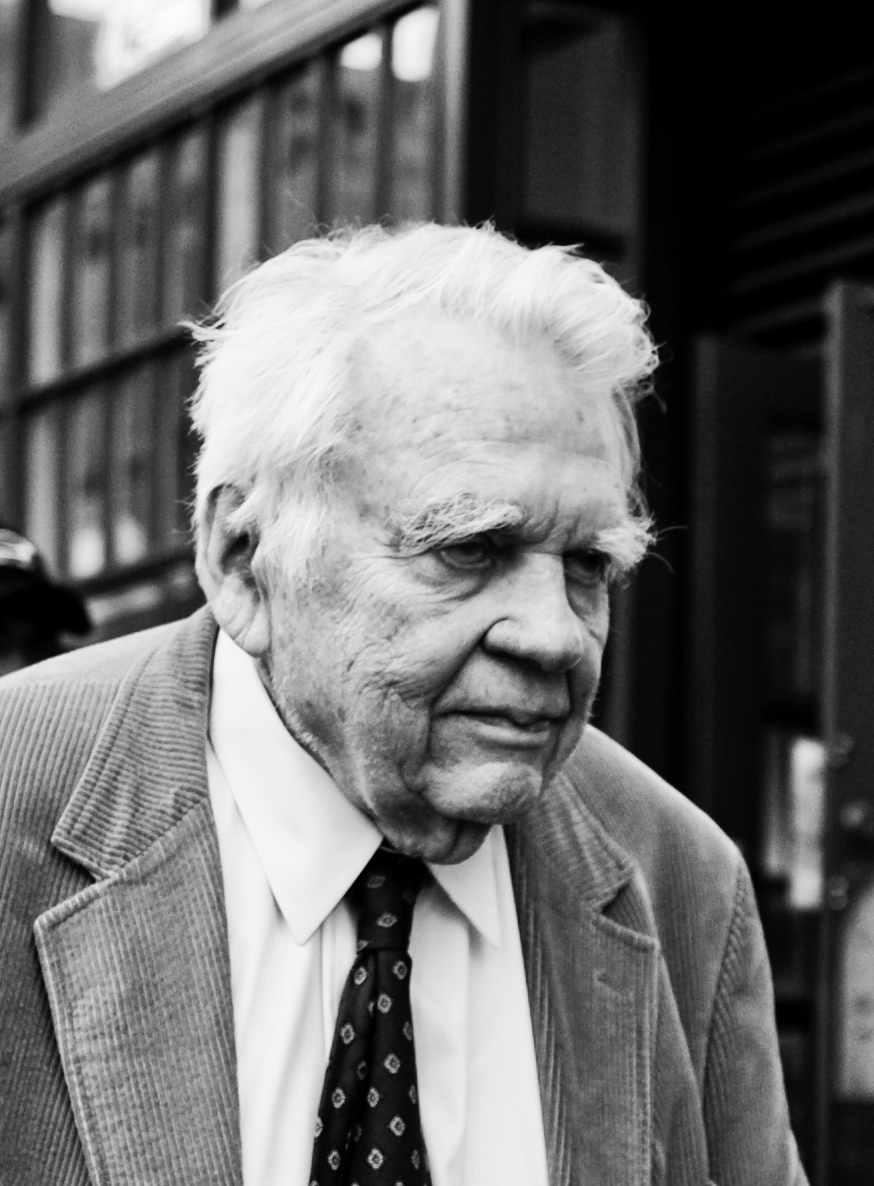
Andy Rooney

The customers who arrived on La Caravelle‍'s last night of business were a mixture of regulars who had come for one last meal and bid farewell, as well as those who had never visited it before and wanted to see a piece of New York history before it was no more. Walter Cronkite and his wife dined with colleague Andy Rooney and his daughter; the Cronkites said they had been patrons of La Caravelle for 43 years. A couple came with their teenage daughter, who was so fussy about food, the La Caravelle chef would cook a packaged macaroni and cheese dinner for her. Another family of three made reservations for four; one for the husband's mother who had been a La Caravelle regular and had died in 2000. People with no reservations managed to gain entrance to the restaurant's bar and were able to be seated at a table. A young couple who had come to have a drink on La Caravelle's last night was graciously seated at the table which was formerly reserved for Jacqueline Kennedy Onassis, who continued to patronize the restaurant after her marriage to Aristotle Onassis. Upon entering the restaurant's main room, a woman exclaimed that it was her best New York moment and she could now move to the suburbs. Though the restaurant never offered music or entertainment, the Jammets had arranged for Robert White, a tenor and teacher at the Juilliard School to perform "Danny Boy". White was a patron of La Caravelle on the restaurant's first night of business in 1960. It was awarded the James Beard Foundation's Most Outstanding Restaurant in the Country award in the year of its closing. (Note: Two other well-known New York French restaurants also closed in 2004: Lutèce and La Côte Basque.) The name is now known for champagnes produced by the Jammets; the restaurant began serving them as its house brand in 1997.
