= Michel Richard Citronelle =

Coordinates: 38°54′17.6″N 77°3′34.6″W

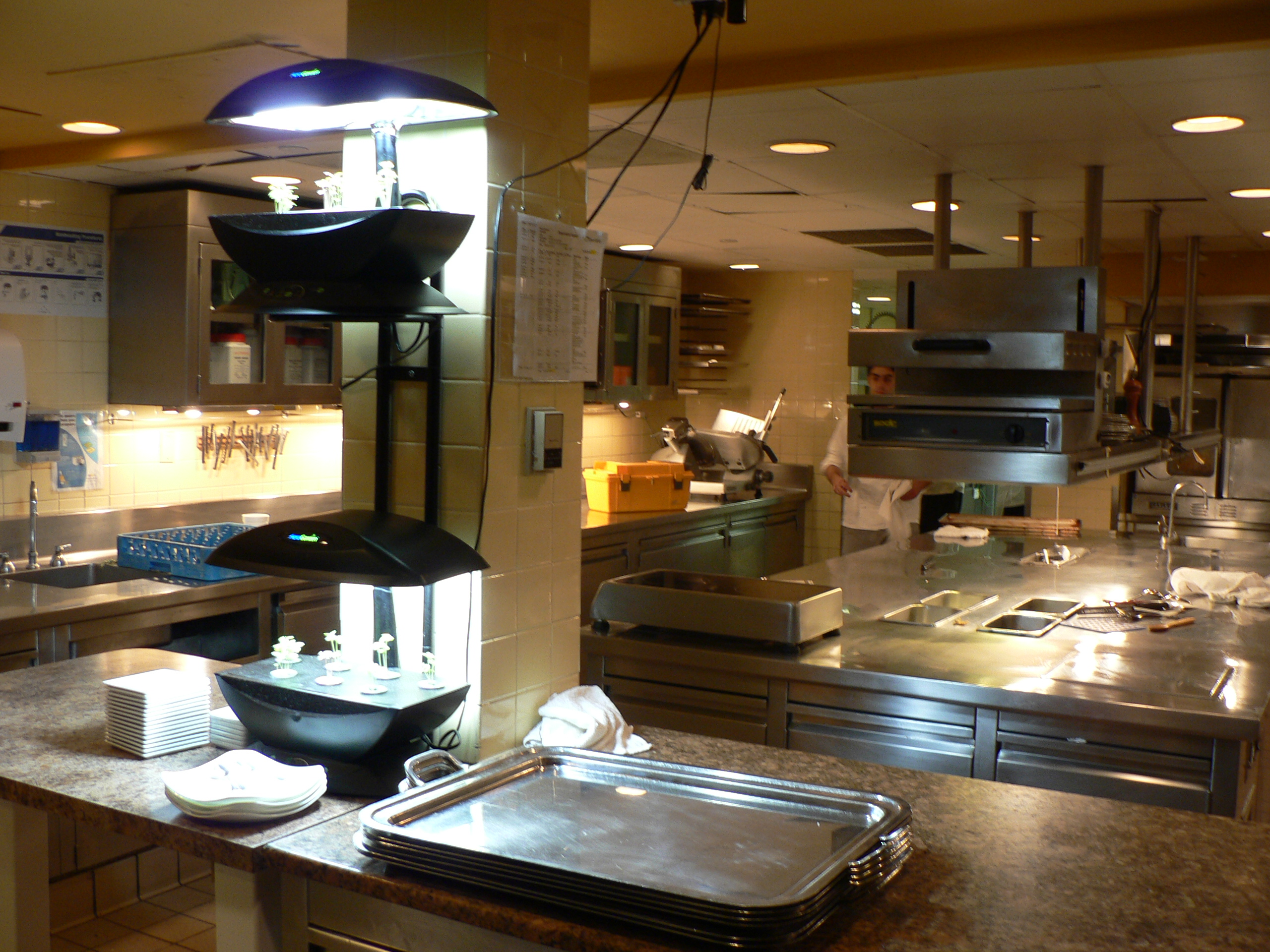
- Kitchen at Michel Richard Citronelle
- Interactive map of Michel Richard Citronelle

Restaurant information
- Established: 1993
- Closed: 2012
- Head chef: Michel Richard
- Food type: French with North American and Asian
- Location: 3000 M Street NW, Washington, D.C., United States

Michel Richard Citronelle was an American restaurant located in Georgetown, Washington, D.C. The chef and owner of Citronelle was James Beard Award-winning chef Michel Richard.

== Background and opening ==
Michel Richard became a nationally renowned chef in Los Angeles in the 1980s, and he opened his first Citronelle restaurant in Santa Barbara, California in 1989. In 1993, he opened Citronelle at the Latham Hotel at 3000 M St. NW in Georgetown, Washington, D.C., hiring Etienne Jaulin as the executive chef. Subsequent versions of Citronelle opened in Baltimore, Tokyo and Carmel, California.

A review in the Washington Post noted that even though Richard was not regularly in the kitchen, the food had "the brilliance, the originality and the quality of Richard's cooking in California." A Washingtonian magazine review noted the "sense of festivity," highlighting the Reuben sandwiche ravioli and Richard's re-envisioning of a Kit Kat bar. The New York Times called Citronelle "one of the most consistently excellent newcomers" in the D.C. dining scene.

In its early days, Citronelle was a regular destination for members of President Bill Clinton's administration. Attorney General Janet Reno was seen there having dinner with Barbra Streisand. Citronelle was also frequented by First Lady Hillary Clinton and Secretary of State Warren Christopher.

== Renovation and recognition ==
In 1998, Richard renovated the restaurant and renamed it Michel Richard Citronelle. He sold off half of his interest in his Los Angeles restaurants and moved to Washington, D.C., making Michel Richard Citronelle his flagship restaurant and giving it his full-time attention.

In 2002, Citronelle was named Fine Dining Restaurant of the Year by the Restaurant Association of Metropolitan Washington, and Richard was named Chef of the Year. In 2001 and 2006, it was named among the top 20 restaurants in the country by Gourmet magazine. In 2007, Richard won the James Beard Foundation Award for Outstanding Chef, and Citronelle wine director Mark Slater won for Outstanding Wine Service. Washingtonian magazine named Citronelle the No.1 Very Best Restaurant in Washington in 2007 and 2008.

In May 2009, President Barack Obama and Michelle Obama celebrated their first date night at Citronelle.

In July 2012, Citronelle closed due to water damage. The restaurant did not reopen.
