= Henri Soulé =

French-American restaurateur (1903–1966)

Henri Soulé (March 12, 1903–January 27, 1966) was the French-American proprietor of Le Pavillon and La Côte Basque restaurants in New York City. Soulé also operated The Hedges in East Hampton, New York.

He is credited with having "trained an entire generation of French chefs and New York restaurant owners." He is also credited with using Siberia to describe the least desirable seats in a restaurant.

== Biography ==
Soulé was a captain at the Café de Paris in London before becoming the maître d'.

At the request of the French government, he came to the United States to run the Le Restaurant Français at the 1939 World's Fair. He did not return to France at the end of the Fair due to the German occupation. He opened Le Pavillon in 1941, considered the most influential French restaurant in America in the 1940s and 1950s.

In his autobiography The Apprentice, noted chef Jacques Pépin describes Soulé, whom he worked for at Le Pavilion, as being exploitative and abusive to his employees, including his then head chef Pierre Franey. Soule used hired criminals to physically threaten his staff when they demanded increased pay. A goon lifted Pépin physically off the ground after an initial protest, which was suppressed. However, Soulé could not keep his employees from departing en masse for other employment, which they did: Le Pavilion shut down shortly thereafter.

When he died, New York Times restaurant critic Craig Claiborne said "we had lost 'the Michelangelo, the Mozart, the Leonardo of the French restaurant in America.'" One source states he died of a stroke at La Côte Basque. Another source says he died of a heart attack.
