= Craig Claiborne =

American critic, journalist and author (1920–2000)

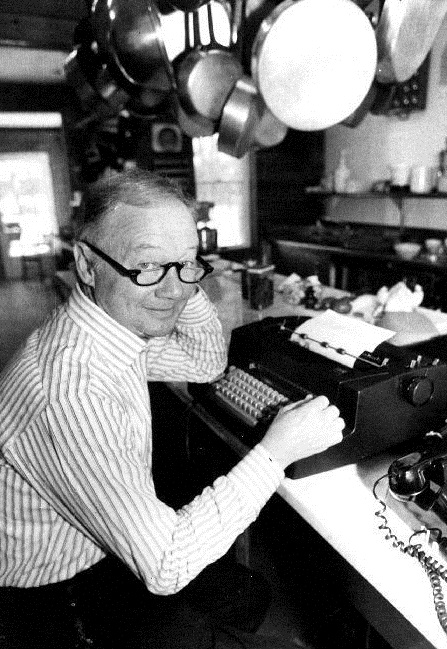
- Claiborne in 1981
- Born: September 4, 1920; Sunflower, Mississippi, US
- Died: January 22, 2000 (aged 79); New York City, US
- Education: University of Missouri (B.A.); École hôtelière de Lausanne (Lausanne Hotel School)
- Occupations: Newspaper columnist (restaurant criticism); journalist; book writer

Craig Claiborne (1920 – 2000) was an American restaurant critic, food journalist, and book author. A long-time food editor and restaurant critic for The New York Times, he was also the author of numerous cookbooks and an autobiography. He made many contributions to gastronomy and food writing in the United States.

== Early life ==
Craig Claiborne was born in Sunflower, Mississippi, on September 4, 1920. He was raised on the region's distinctive cuisine in the kitchen of his mother's boarding house in Indianola, Mississippi.

He essayed in premedical studies at the Mississippi State College from 1937 to 1939. Finding it to be unsuitable, he transferred to the University of Missouri, where he majored in journalism and got his Bachelor of Arts.

Claiborne served in the U.S. Navy during World War II and the Korean War. After deciding that his true passion lay in cooking, he used his G.I. Bill benefits to attend the École hôtelière de Lausanne (Lausanne Hotel School) in Lausanne, Switzerland.

== Career ==
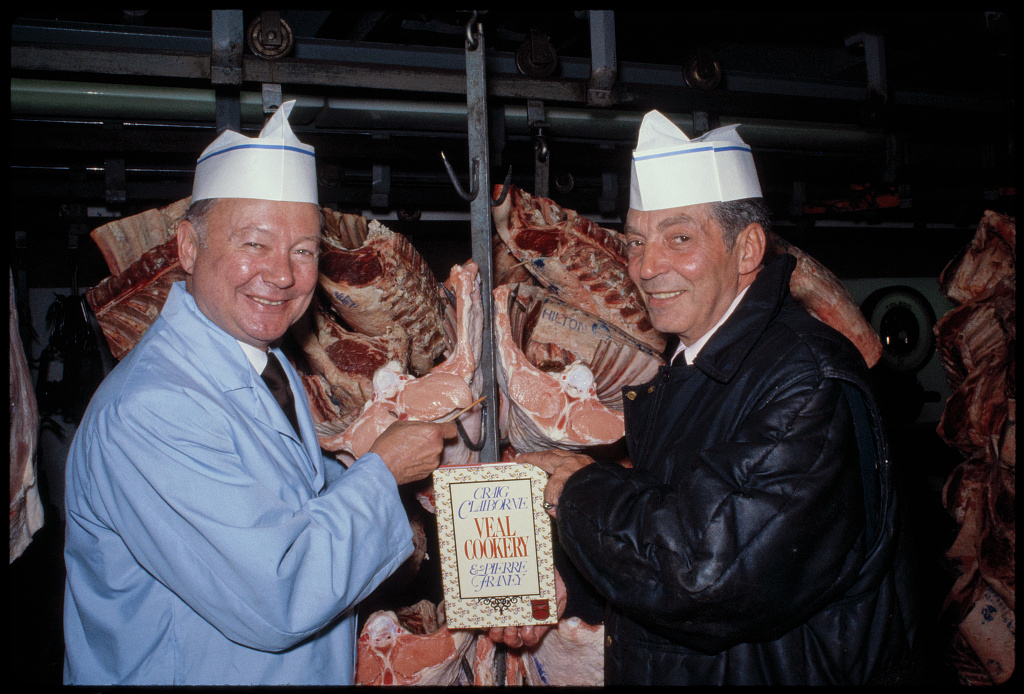
Claiborne in 1982

Returning to the U.S., he worked his way up in the food-publishing business in New York City, as a contributor to Gourmet magazine and a food-product publicist, finally becoming the food editor of The New York Times in 1957 following the newspaper's first food editor, Jane Nickerson.

Claiborne was the first man to supervise the food page at a major American newspaper and is credited with broadening The New York Times's coverage of new restaurants and innovative chefs. A typical food section of a newspaper in the 1950s was largely targeted to a female readership and limited to columns on entertaining and cooking for the upscale homemaker. Claiborne brought his knowledge of cuisine and own passion for food to the pages, transforming it into an important cultural and social bellwether for New York City and the nation at large.

Claiborne's columns, reviews and cookbooks introduced a generation of Americans to a variety of ethnic cuisines – particularly Asian and Mexican cuisines – at a time when average Americans had conservative tastes in food, and what little gourmet cooking was available in cities like New York was exclusively French (and, Claiborne observed, not terribly high quality). Looking to hold restaurants accountable for what they served and help the public make informed choices about where to spend their dining dollars, he created the four-star system of rating restaurants still used by The New York Times and which has been widely imitated. Claiborne's reviews were exacting and uncompromising, but he also approached his task as a critic with an open mind and eye for cooking that was different, creative and likely to appeal to his readers.

Inspired by food writers including M. F. K. Fisher, Claiborne also enjoyed documenting his own eating experiences and the discovery of new talent and new culinary trends across the country and across the world. Among the many then-unknown chefs he brought to the public's attention was the New Orleans, Louisiana, chef and restaurateur Paul Prudhomme. At the time, few people outside America's Deep South had any awareness of Louisiana's Cajun culture or its unique culinary traditions.

Along with chef, author and television personality Julia Child, Claiborne has been credited with making the often intimidating world of French and other ethnic cuisine accessible to an American audience and American tastes. Claiborne authored or edited over twenty cookbooks on a wide range of foods and culinary styles, including some of the first best-selling cookbooks dedicated to healthy, low-sodium and low-cholesterol diets. He had a long-time professional relationship and collaborated on many books and projects with the French-born New York City chef, author and television personality Pierre Franey. Claiborne was an advocate of a fad diet known as the Gourmet Diet. With Franey, he worked out two hundred low-sodium, low-cholesterol recipes for this diet.

In September 1966 thirteen mafia leaders were arrested at La Stella Restaurant while holding a meeting. The New York Times responded by sending out Claiborne to the restaurant, who gave it a two star rating.

=== $4,000 meal ===
In 1975, he placed a $300 winning bid at a charity auction for a no-price-limit dinner for two at any restaurant of the winner's choice, sponsored by American Express. He selected Franey as his dining companion, and the two settled on Chez Denis, a noted restaurant located in Paris, France, where they racked up a $4,000 tab (equivalent to $23,900 in 2025) on a five-hour, thirty-one-course meal of foie gras, truffles, lobster, caviar and rare wines. When Claiborne later wrote about the experience in his New York Times column, the newspaper received a deluge of reader mail expressing outrage at such an extravagance at a time when so many in the world went without. Even the Vatican and Pope Paul VI criticized it, calling it "scandalous." It was also noted that he and Franey ordered nearly every dish on the menu, but they took only a few bites of each one. Despite its scale and expense, Claiborne gave the meal a mixed review, noting that several dishes fell short in terms of conception, presentation or quality.

=== Death and legacy ===
Claiborne, who suffered from a variety of health problems in his later years, died on January 22, 2000 at age 79 at St. Luke's-Roosevelt Hospital, New York. No cause of death was given. In his will, he bequeathed his estate to The Culinary Institute of America, located in Hyde Park, New York.

== Bibliography ==
- The New York Times Cookbook (1961) Harper & Row
- The New York Times Menu Cook Book (1966) Harper & Row ISBN 006010791X
- The New York Times International Cookbook (1971) Harper & Row ISBN 006010788X
- Craig Claiborne's Favorites from The New York Times Vol. 1 (1975) Times Books ISBN 0517324180
- Craig Claiborne's Favorites from the New York Times Vol. 2 (1976) Times Books ISBN 0517324180
- Craig Claiborne's Favorites from the New York Times Vol. 3 (1977) Times Books ISBN 0812907086
- Craig Claiborne's Favorites from the New York Times Vol. 4 (1978) Random House Trade ISBN 081290768X
- Cooking with Herbs and Spices (1977) Bantam Books ISBN 0553230751
- Veal Cookery (1978) (with Pierre Franey) Harper-Collins ISBN 0060107731
- Classic French Cooking (1978) Time-Life Foods of the World ISBN 0809400472
- Craig Claiborne's The New New York Times Cookbook (1980) with Pierre Franey, New York Times Books, ISBN 0-517-12235-9
- A Feast Made for Laughter (1982) autobiography, Doubleday ISBN 0385157002
- The Master Cooking Course (1982) (with Pierre Franey), Putnam Pub. Group ISBN 0399505865
- Cooking with Craig Claiborne and Pierre Franey (1985) Ballantine Books ISBN 0449901300
- Craig Claiborne's Memorable Meals Menus, Memories and Recipes from over Twenty Years of Entertaining (1985) E P Dutton ISBN 0525243526
- Craig Claiborne's The New York Times Food Encyclopedia (1985) Crown Books ISBN 0812912713
- Craig Claiborne's Gourmet Diet (1985) (with Pierre Franey), Ballantine Books ISBN 0345336356
- Craig Claiborne's Southern Cooking (1987) New York Times Books ISBN 0517077574
- The New York Times Cook Book Revised Edition (1990) Harper & Row ISBN 0060160101
- Elements of Etiquette: A Guide to Table Manners in an Imperfect World (1992) William Morrow & Co ISBN 0688074022
- The Chinese Cookbook (1992) (with Virginia Lee) HarperCollins ISBN 0060922613
- Craig Claiborne's Kitchen Primer (1993) Random House ISBN 9780517093627
- The Best of Craig Claiborne: 1,000 Recipes from His New York Times Food Columns and Four of His Classic Cookbooks (1999) Times Books ISBN 0812930894

- (story on $4000 meal is anthologized in) American Food Writing: An Anthology with Classic Recipes, ed. Molly O'Neill (Library of America, 2007) ISBN 1-59853-005-4

== See also ==
- List of American print journalists
- List of gay, lesbian or bisexual people
- List of people from Mississippi
- List of people from New York City
