= André Soltner =

French-American chef (1932–2025)

- Soltner, c. 2000
- Born: 20 November 1932; Thann, Third French Republic
- Died: 18 January 2025 (aged 92); Charlottesville, Virginia, U.S.
- Occupations: Chef; Author
- Organizations: Lutèce; French Culinary Institute
- Spouse: Simone (m. 1962; died 2016)
- Awards: Meilleur Ouvrier de France; Légion d'honneur

André Soltner (French pronunciation: [ɑ̃.dʁe sɔlt.nɛʁ]; 20 November 1932 – 18 January 2025) was a French-American chef and author, based for decades at New York City's Lutèce, from its opening in 1961 as chef, later as partner and from 1973 as owner until 1994. He ran the restaurant together with his wife, Simone. He was regarded as one of America's first superstar chefs, and the restaurant as America's Best French Restaurant. Soltner later was Dean of Classic Studies at the French Culinary Institute.

== Career ==
Soltner was born in Thann in Alsace, on 20 November 1932, the son of a cabinet maker. As a boy he wanted to follow in his father's trade, but when the business went to his older brother, he turned to cooking, impressed by his mother's devotion to it. He started his career at age 15 at the Hôtel du Parc in Mulhouse with a three-year apprenticeship, learning all stations of the kitchen. He also trained at hotel restaurants in Normandy and Switzerland. After military service, he became chef at Chez Hansi in Paris, an Alsatian brasserie, where Simone Gomez, his future wife, was a waitress. He was recognized there by Andre Surmain who suggested running a restaurant in New York City together.

Soltner became chef at Lutèce at 29, when Surmain opened it in 1961. Soltner once told a reporter: "I thought I'd come back here, learn English, see what's what for a while, and then go back and open a business in France. Well, things don't work out the way we think." The first review in The New York Times by Craig Claiborne, one month after the opening, described the place as "impressively elegant and conspicuously expensive" awarding it only one star. The first years of the restaurant were difficult. Soltner struggled with lack of high-quality ingredients, saying “no chanterelles, no Dover sole. The bread was miserable.". Expressing a desire to move back to France, Surmain offered him a partnership. Soltner and his wife moved in above Lutece, to keep better tabs on the running of the restaurant. His wife, in particular, took care of reception and management.

Lutèce has been compared to a gilded bistro, serving specialties from Alsace in an intimate setting. Soltner was a pioneer in having high ingredient quality standards, such as fresh fish flown in overnight, and contracts with farmers to supply shallots and mushrooms. His technique was described as flawless and his approach to French cuisine as "modern-minded. He served classic dishes, such as tournedos Wellington, pied de porc, hot raspberry souffle and petits fours. The restaurant rose in recognition by both diners and critics, achieving a four-star rating from The New York Times. Soltner became the sole owner in 1972. He missed only 4 days while at Lutèce, because of funerals in his family.

Soltner sold the restaurant in 1994, after working there for 33 years, to Ark Restaurants, which ran it until it closed in 2004. It remained one of the highly ranked restaurants in the U.S.

Soltner received more than 25 awards, including the French government's Légion d'honneur and Officier du Mérite National. He was honored with the James Beard Foundation's Lifetime Achievement Award, the 1968 Meilleur Ouvrier de France, and was a Chevalier du Mérite Agricole.

Soltner was a member of several culinary organizations, including the American Institute of Wine & Food, for which he and his wife established the André and Simone Soltner Food Education Scholarship to support applicants pursuing a culinary career. He served for more than 20 years as Délegué Général of the Maîtres Cuisiniers de France, was a trustee of the Société Culinaire Philanthropique, and served as Dean of Classic Studies at the French Culinary Institute, part of the new International Culinary Center in New York City.

== Personal life ==
Soltner married Simone in 1962. They had no children. They lived in the apartment above the restaurant until 2004, when they moved to a new apartment in Manhattan. They spent Sundays at a home in Hunter Mountain where he liked to ski. Simone Soltner died in 2016. He also had a home in Cannes.

Soltner died at a hospital in Charlottesville, Virginia, on 18 January 2025, at the age of 92.
