= Le Pavillon (Henri Soulé restaurant) =

New York City restaurant from 1941 to 1966

- Interactive map of Le Pavillon

Restaurant information
- Established: October 15, 1941
- Closed: 1972
- Previous owner: Henri Soulé
- Head chef: Pierre Franey
- Food type: French
- Location: 111 East 57th Street (1957–1972); 5 East 55th Street (1941–1957), New York City, New York, United States
- Coordinates: 40°45′40″N 73°58′26″W

Le Pavillon was a New York City restaurant that defined French food in the United States from 1941 to 1972.

The restaurant started as the Le Restaurant du Pavillon de France at the 1939 New York World's Fair run by Henri Soulé (1904–1966). During this time, Charles Masson Sr., co-founder of New York City's famed restaurant La Grenouille had worked under Henri Soulé in Le Pavillon. When World War II began, Soulé and the Pavillon chef Pierre Franey stayed in the United States as war refugees.

The restaurant formally opened on October 15, 1941, at 5 East 55th Street on Fifth Avenue, across the street from the St. Regis New York. In 1957, Le Pavillon moved to the Ritz Tower on Park Avenue and 57th Street. Soulé died in 1966, and Le Pavillon closed in 1972.

In his autobiography, Jacques Pépin describes how he was first employed at Le Pavilion after emigrating to the US in 1959. He found that Franey and the rest of the staff were underpaid and treated poorly by Soulé, who insisted that he was barely making ends meet, even though he would offer complimentary meals and wine to a large number of celebrity guests. When Pépin and others organized a protest, he found himself physically threatened by organized-crime goons. However, there was soon an exodus of the staff (Franey and Pépin moved to Howard Johnson's) and the restaurant never recovered. Soulé's other faux pas was allowing paparazzi to disturb the Kennedy family (who were regular customers) and their staffers during John F. Kennedy's presidential campaign: when the Kennedy team, which was dining at the restaurant, asked the paparazzi to leave, Soulé insisted that only he had the right, as owner, to determine who entered and left the restaurant, and stated that, even before the election, "the Kennedys already think they are running the country." (Pépin was offered the job of White House chef after the election, but declined.)

Daniel Boulud opened a restaurant with the same name in 2021, in homage to Soulé's restaurant.

== See also ==
- List of French restaurants
