= La Côte Basque =

Former restaurant in New York City

- Interactive map of La Côte Basque

Restaurant information
- Established: 1959
- Closed: 2004
- Location: 60 West 55th Street, New York, New York, 10019, United States
- Coordinates: 40°45′45″N 73°58′37″W

La Côte Basque was a New York City restaurant. It opened in the late 1950s and operated until it closed on March 7, 2004. In business for 45 years, upon its closing The New York Times called it a "former high-society temple of French cuisine at 60 West 55th Street."

== History ==
Henri Soulé opened the restaurant in the late 1950s. Jean-Jacques Rachou became the owner and chef in 1979. At that time the restaurant was located a block to the east, moving to the West 55th Street location in 1995. It was "known as much for its elegantly arrayed tables, set against a backdrop of handsome French seaside murals, as for its food. Mr. Rachou said he spent more than $2,200 a week on flowers and more than $3,000 on linen."

Truman Capote's unfinished novel Answered Prayers includes a catty luncheon among thinly disguised socialites in the chapter "La Côte Basque 1965", first published in Esquire magazine in 1975. A scene from the film Light Sleeper features Willem Dafoe and Susan Sarandon eating lunch in the restaurant.

Famous patrons included Jacqueline Kennedy Onassis, Babe Paley, Nan Kempner, and Frank Sinatra.

The restaurant was prominently featured throughout the 2024 series Feud: Capote vs. The Swans.
