= Paul Feig's unrealized projects =

During his extensive career, American filmmaker Paul Feig has worked on several projects which never progressed beyond the pre-production stage under his direction. Some of these projects fell in development hell, were officially canceled, were in development limbo or would see life under a different production team.

== As director ==
=== Freaks & Geeks season 2 ===
In 2000, Feig could’ve directed and produced the second season of Freaks & Geeks after MTV offered to pick up the canceled NBC show.

=== Untitled Guy-obsessed-with-Woman film ===
In June 2011, Feig was set to direct and write a comedy film about a guy who is obsessed with a woman, with Jon Hamm and Melissa McCarthy possibly attached to star as the leads, and Judd Apatow & Feig are attached to produce the film for Universal Pictures.

=== Bridget Jones’s Baby ===
On July 8, 2011, Feig was in talks to direct the third Bridgett Jones film, with Renee Zellweger, Colin Firth, and Hugh Grant possibly attached to star as the leads, Helen Fielding was writing the screenplay, Working Title & Focus Features will produce, and Universal to distribute, until he left the movie and was replaced by Sharon Maguire.

=== The Better Woman ===
On January 9, 2012, Feig was set to direct The Better Woman, a rom-com written by Amy Sherman-Palladino, based on an idea by Ron Bass and Jen Smolka, Julie Yorn producing the film, & Universal Pictures will distribute.

=== Garlic and Sapphires feature film ===
On March 27, 2012, Feig was set to direct the feature film adaptation of Ruth Reichl’s novel Garlic and Sapphires, with Elizabeth Sarnoff re-writing the screenplay, & Fox 2000 will distribute.

=== American The Intouchables remake (aka The Upside) ===
On March 29, 2012, Feig was in talks to direct and write the American remake of Éric Toledano and Olivier Nakache’s film The Intouchables, with Colin Firth in talks to star for The Weinstein Company, which was released as The Upside with Neil Burger directing instead of Feig.

=== Wish List ===
On April 20, 2012, Feig was in talks to direct “Wish List,” a comedy fantasy film with Reese Witherspoon possibly attached to star, Jonathan Aibel and Glenn Berger rewriting Randi Mayem Singer’s original screenplay, Mark Ciardi & Gordon Gray will produce with Mayhem Pictures, and Walt Disney Pictures to distribute.

=== Wonder Woman action-comedy film ===
In October 2013, Feig pitched an action-comedy film about Wonder Woman to Warner Bros. that was tonally influenced by Iron Man. A non-comedic Wonder Woman movie was released in 2017 from director Patty Jenkins.

=== Animated Play-Doh film ===
On April 2, 2015, Feig was in negotiations to direct and produce the animated feature film adaptation of Play-Doh, with Craig Buck, Susan Carlson, Eric Carlson and James Keach will produce the film for 20th Century Fox. On March 17, 2022, Jon M. Chu was set to direct, and Feig won’t direct & produce the movie for Hasbro & eOne.

=== Groom ===
On March 8, 2016, Feig was set to direct and produce “Groom,” with Jessie Henderson producing the film for 20th Century Fox to distribute the film.

=== Late Night ===
On November 3, 2016, Feig was in talks to direct Late Night, a comedy written by Mindy Kaling, who would costar in the film with Emma Thompson, with Jessie Henderson producing the film for 20th Century Fox to distribute the film, until August 4, 2017, when Feig left the project, with Nisha Ganatra replacing him as the director and eventually being release by Amazon Studios instead of 20th Century Fox.

=== The Sweetest Fig feature film ===
On August 1, 2018, Feig was set to direct the feature film adaptation of Chris Van Allsburg’s book The Sweetest Fig, with Van Allsburg, William Teitler, Mike Weber, Ted Field, and Feigco’s Jessie Henderson producing the film for 20th Century Fox to distribute the film.

=== Dark Army ===
On September 12, 2019, Feig was reportedly going to direct, write, and produce Dark Army, a monster movie featuring the Universal Monsters line-up for Universal Pictures. but Feig said that he hopes that Universal will find the proper budget for the movie.

=== The House Across the Lake feature film ===
On March 20, 2023, Feig was set to direct and produce the feature film adaptation of Riley Sager’s novel The House Across the Lake, with Sarah Schechter, Greg Berlanti, Mike McGrath & Laura Fischer producing the movie for Netflix to distribute.

=== Untitled Failed Double Agent movie ===
On April 11, 2023, Feig was in talks to direct and produce Jenny Bicks’ failed double agent comedy pitch, with Sebastian Stan and Maria Bakalova set to star, and Stan producing with Emily Gerson Saines & FeigCo’s Laura Allen Fischer for Paramount Pictures to distribute.

=== Worst Roommate Ever feature film ===
On July 24, 2024, Feig was set to direct and produce the feature film adaptation of William Brennan’s article Worst Roommate Ever, with Stephen Susco attached to write the screenplay, and Laura Fischer, Jason Blum through Blumhouse Productions, Chris Morgan and Vox Media’s Scoop Wasserstein, while Chris Morgan Productions’ Ainsley Morgan, Brennan, Bea Sequeira and Shaun S. Sutton were attached as executive producers.

== As producer ==
=== Untitled musical film ===
On March 14, 2014, Feig was set to executive produce a movie musical written by Yana Gorskaya and Maia Rossini, based on an original pitch by Feig, with FeigCo Entertainment producing & 20th Century Fox set to distribute the film.

=== Supermodel Snowpocalypse ===
On July 26, 2016, Feig was set to executive produce Supermodel Snowpocalypse, the feature film adaptation of Mickey Rapkin’s Elle article “This Drug-Fueled, Multimillion-Dollar Supermodel Snowpocalypse Has Been Fashion's Best-Kept Secret Since '77,” with Jessie Henderson producing the film through FeigCo Entertainment along Chris Goldberg, & Paramount Pictures will distribute.

=== Girls Code TV series ===
On October 31, 2017, Feig was set to executive produce the workplace comedy series “Girls Code,” with Kim Rosenstock writing the series based on Joy Gorman Wettels’ original idea, and Rosenstock executive producing through FeigCo Entertainment, Paramount Television & Anonymous Content will produce the series for Freeform cable channel. and on February 20, 2018, the series was picked up for a pilot for Freeform.

=== Turned On ===
On August 6, 2018, Feig was set to produce Turned On, a sci-fi comedy about a brilliant but awkward engineer who creates an android clone to fill in with difficult situations, with Tamra Davis directing Charles Kesslering’s screenplay at FeigCo Entertainment and 20th Century Fox to distribute.

=== False Alarm ===
On February 11, 2019, Feig was set to executive produce Rob Turbovsky and Matteo Borghese’s ensemble comedy screenplay “False Alarm,” with Sam Esmail executive producing the movie while Dylan Clark & Beau Bauman are producing through Dylan Clark Productions in collaboration with Anonymous Content’s Chad Hamilton, and Universal Pictures was set to distribute.

=== Throw It Back ===
In June 29, 2021, Feig was set to produce Throw It Back, a musical dance dramedy with Shadae Lamar Smith directing from a script he co-wrote with Rochée Jeffrey, Young Thug, who is also the song supervisor, will star in the movie with Shahadi Wright Joseph, FeigCo producing with Tiffany Haddish’s She’s Ready company & Thug.

=== Suburban Hell feature film ===
On January 17, 2023, Feig was set to executive produce the feature film adaptation of Maureen Kilmer’s novel “Suburban Hell,” with Joanna Calo writing the screenplay, Sam Raimi, Rob Tapert, Laura Fischer, Romel Adam, and Jose Cañas producing with Legendary Entertainment.
