= Middle of the Night =

Middle of the Night may refer to:

- Middle of the Night (novel), a 2024 novel by Riley Sager
- Middle of the Night, a 1954 play by Paddy Chayefsky
- Middle of the Night (film), a 1959 film based on the play
- "Middle of the Night" (The Vamps and Martin Jensen song), 2017
- "Middle of the Night" (Elley Duhé song), 2020
- "Middle of the Night", a song by Amy Shark from the 2018 album Love Monster
- "Middle of the Night", a song by Brotherhood of Man from the 1978 album Higher Than High
- "Middle of the Night", a song by Monsta X from the 2020 album All About Luv
- "Middle of the Night", a 1952 B-side to "One Mint Julep", by the Clovers

== Other uses ==
- Middle-of-the-night insomnia, a medical condition

== See also ==
- Midnight (disambiguation)
- In the Middle of the Night (disambiguation)
