= In the Middle of the Night =

In the Middle of the Night may refer to:

- In the Middle of the Night (film), a 1984 Danish film directed by Erik Balling
- In the Middle of the Night (novel), a 1995 young-adult novel by Robert Cormier
- In the Middle of the Night, an album by Aerial, 1978
- "In the Middle of the Night" (Magic Affair song), 1994
- "In the Middle of the Night", a song by Eddie Meduza from Eddie Meduza and the Roarin' Cadillacs, 1979
- "In the Middle of the Night", a song by Madness from One Step Beyond..., 1979
- "In the Middle of the Night", a song by Martha Wainwright from I Know You're Married But I've Got Feelings Too, 2008
- Another name for Middle of the Night, a 1959 American film starring Fredric March and Kim Novak

== See also ==
- Middle of the Night (disambiguation)
