= Margaret Costa =

Margaret Costa may refer to:

- Margaret Jull Costa (born 1949), British translator of Portuguese- and Spanish-language fiction and poetry
- Margaret Costa (food writer), (1917–1999), British food writer and restaurateur
