= Omen III (song) =

1994 single by Magic Affair

Single by Magic Affair

from the album Omen (The Story Continues...)
- Released: 13 December 1993
- Genre: Eurodance; Eurodisco; hi-NRG; techno
- Length: 3:56
- Label: Electrola; Power Brothers
- Songwriters: Mike Staab; Rainer Kempf; A.K. S.W.I.F.T.; B. Waldstädt
- Producer: Mike Staab

Magic Affair singles chronology
"Omen III" (1993)	"Give Me All Your Love" (1994)

Music video
- "Omen III" on YouTube

"Omen III" is a song by German Eurodance band Magic Affair, which consisted of vocalist Franca Morgano and rapper A.K. Swift. Released in December 1993, by Electrola and Power Brothers, as the lead single from the band's debut album, Omen (The Story Continues...) (1994), it is also their most successful song. It was co-written and produced by Mike Staab and peaked at number-one in Germany, and number two in both Austria and Finland. In Germany alone it has sold 750,000 copies and gold status on the single were achieved within just eight weeks of release. On the UK Singles Chart, it reached number 17 and sold under 180,000 copies, missing the silver certification just barely. Magic Affair won the 1994 Echo award in Germany, for the best German dance single with "Omen III".

== Background and release ==
Magic Affair have only performed the third in the 'Omen' series, which all were produced and created by Frankfurt DJ Michael Staab (aka Mike Staab). The previous two Omen singles released back in '89 by Sony were sung by German dance floor house act Mysterious Art, which was founded in 1988. The first single, titled "Das Omen (Teil 1)" went to number-one and sold over half-a-million units in the GSA territories alone. It remained for nine weeks straight as number-one on the West German singles chart. The second, "Carma (Omen 2)" was released later that year and climbed to number nine, while the debut album, Omen - The Story was slow to take off, selling just 70.000 units and failing to make it into the charts.

"Omen III" was written by producer Staab with Rainer Kempf, A.K. Swift and B. Waldstädt. The song has 138 beats per minute. While German music TV channel VIVA and dealers got behind it, Germany's radio stations played a minor role in its story of success. One of the first German radio stations to believe in the record was Tillmann Uhrmacher of Rheinland-Pfalz Radio (RPR) in Ludwigshafen. It topped their "in & out" listeners poll for four weeks and was then added to their power play list.

== Chart performance ==
"Omen III" was very successful on the charts across Europe, remaining the band's biggest hit. The single peaked at number-one in Germany for four weeks, and number two in Austria and Finland. In Germany, gold status sales on the single were achieved within just eight weeks of release, and it ended up as the fifth most-sold singe in Germany that year. In Austria, the single peaked at number two on Ö3 Austria Top 40 for three weeks, being kept from the number-one position by "All for Love" by Bryan Adams, Rod Stewart and Sting. Additionally, "Omen III" entered the top 10 also in Belgium (8), Denmark (4), the Netherlands (4), Sweden (3) and Switzerland (3), as well as on the Eurochart Hot 100, where it peaked at number five after 12 weeks on the chart. On the European Dance Radio Chart, it peaked at number 20 in the same period.

In the United Kingdom, "Omen III" became a top-20 hit, peaking at number 17 in its first week on the UK Singles Chart, on 29 May, missing the silver certification just barely. On the Music Week Dance Singles chart, it reached number 12. The song was a top-20 hit also in France (12) and Ireland (14), and a hit on the dance charts of Finland, France and Greece. Outside Europe, the song was a huge hit in Israel, where it peaked at number five in its second week on the chart, on 5 April. It spent two weeks at that position and 7 weeks in total on the Israeli top 30.

It earned a gold record in Austria, with a sale of 15,000 singles, and a platinum record in Germany, after 500,000 units were sold. Magic Affair was also awarded the German 1994 Echo award for the best German dance single with the song.

== Critical reception ==
Larry Flick from Billboard magazine felt that Magic Affair "exerts tremendous energy in its effort to be rousing and ominous at the same time, with jarring and amusing results. Track rolls into the States on the power of massive European club and sales success, and is ripe for similar acceptance here. The swirling layers of glossy synths are positively hypnotic, driven home by a pounding hi-NRG beat." Hannsjörg Riemann from German Bravo gave it a score of four out of five, writing, "The Frankfurt dance floor formation is up and running again with a new line-up. 'Omen III', a fast, hot 3:56-minute techno piece, sounds like a hit." In his weekly UK chart commentary, James Masterton stated, "Euro-disco strikes again, shooting 'Omen III' in from nowhere. You can see instantly why it is such a hit, girlie vocals and a high-speed rap combining in a commercial formula that may well last another year before it finally runs out of steam."

Pan-European magazine Music & Media noted, "Now he [Mike Staab] figures the time is right for a new lineup and Part III. At 138 bpm, it's maybe even harder hitting than its predecessors." Alan Jones from Music Week also gave it four out of five, adding, "Frantic Teutonic dance, a la Snap, Culture Beat et al, and likely to achieve the same kind of crossover success, because it has an irresistible hook." Johnny Cigarettes from NME complimented the song as "a spectacularly formularised attempt to be 2 Unlimited, Snap and vaguely spooky, with a monstrous tune at the same time. Which means it is fantastic and will, by law, go Top Five." James Hamilton from the Record Mirror Dance Update deemed it a "sinister effects and 'Valkyries' started Culture Beat-like frantic shrill 0-137.6-0bpm German smash" in his weekly dance column.

== Music video ==
A music video was produced to promote the single, featuring the band performing inside a haunted house. Singer Franca Morgano appears as a witch, while rapper A.K. Swift raps among vampire-like females. German music television channel VIVA was instrumental in breaking the act and A-listed the video in February 1994. MTV Europe put it on active rotation in April and three months later, it was B-listed on France's MCM in July 1994. "Omen III" was later made available on YouTube in 2014, and as of late 2025, the video had generated more than 32 million views on the platform.

== Legacy ==
"Omen III" was featured in Finnish broadcaster Yle's "The ABC in Eurodance" in 2016. Jukka Isojoki said, "'Omen III' definitely belongs to the group of Eurodance songs that contain what I want a dance song to contain. Mystery, sex and a fat sound. That's 'Omen III' in a nutshell."

== Track listings ==
- 7-inch (UK, 1994)
1. "Omen III" (single version) – 3:56
2. "Omen III" (instrumental) – 4:40
- 12-inch (Germany, 1993)
1. "Omen III" – 6:10
2. "Omen III" (instrumental version) – 4:40
- CD maxi-single (Germany, 1993)
1. "Omen III" (single version) – 3:56
2. "Omen III" (maxi version) – 6:10
3. "Omen III" (instrumental version) – 4:40
- CD maxi-single (Europe, 1994)
1. "Omen III" (Cyber-Remix) – 5:10
2. "Omen III" (Cyber-Hyper-Remix) – 7:29
3. "Omen III" (single version) – 3:56
- CD maxi-single (US, 1994)
1. "Omen III" (original single version) – 3:56
2. "Omen III" (Cutler Ridge edit) – 3:59
3. "Omen III" (original maxi version) – 6:10
4. "Omen III" (Cutler Ridge extended mix) – 7:18
5. "Omen III" (Straight from Under G mix) – 5:05

== Charts ==
=== Weekly charts ===
Chart (1993–1994)	Peak position
Austria (Ö3 Austria Top 40)	2
Belgium (Ultratop 50 Flanders)	8
Belgium (VRT Top 30 Flanders)	7
Denmark (Tracklisten)	4
Europe (Eurochart Hot 100)	5
Europe (European Dance Radio)	20
Finland (Suomen virallinen lista)	2
France (SNEP)	12
Germany (GfK)	1
Ireland (IRMA)	14
Israel (Israeli Singles Chart)	5
Netherlands (Dutch Top 40)	4
Netherlands (Single Top 100)	7
Scotland (OCC)	75
Sweden (Sverigetopplistan)	3
Switzerland (Schweizer Hitparade)	3
UK Singles (OCC)	17
UK Dance (Music Week)	12

=== Year-end charts ===
Chart (1994)	Position
Austria (Ö3 Austria Top 40)	12
Belgium (Ultratop)	51
Europe (Eurochart Hot 100)	24
Germany (Media Control)	5
Netherlands (Dutch Top 40)	35
Netherlands (Single Top 100)	61
Sweden (Topplistan)	5
Switzerland (Schweizer Hitparade)	39

== Certifications ==
Region	Certification	Certified units/sales
Austria (IFPI Austria)	Gold	25,000^{*}
Germany (BVMI)	Platinum	500,000^{^}
^{*} Sales figures based on certification alone.^{^} Shipments figures based on certification alone.

== Release history ==
Region	Date	Format(s)	Label(s)	Ref.
Germany	13 December 1993	12-inch vinyl; CD	Electrola; Power Brothers	
United Kingdom	23 May 1994	7-inch vinyl; 12-inch vinyl; CD; cassette	Electrola; EMI	
Japan	16 November 1994	Mini-CD	SBK	
