= Fore Street (restaurant) =

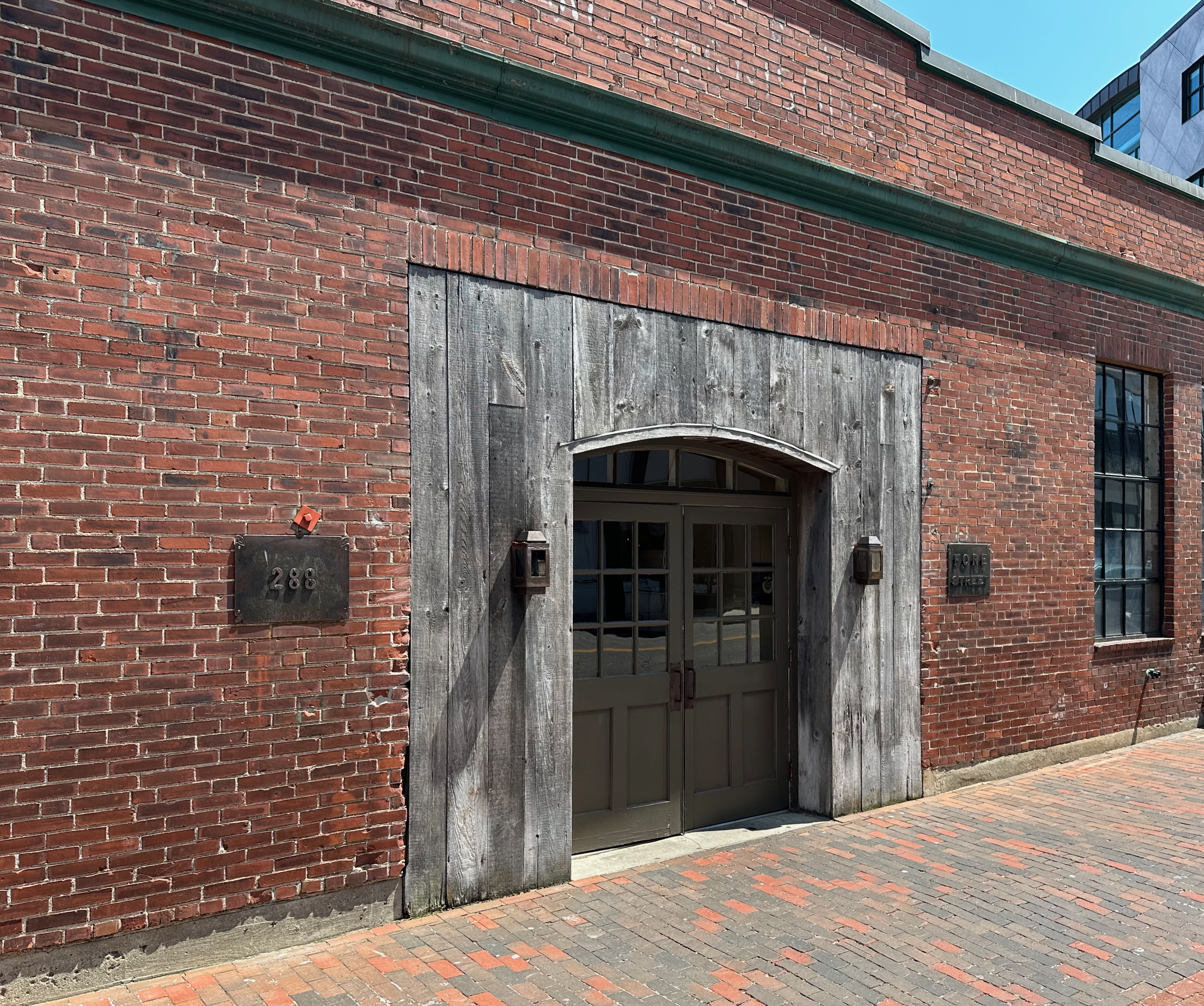
- The restaurant's entrance (2023)
- Interactive map of Fore Street

Restaurant information
- Established: 1996 (30 years ago)
- Owners: Dana Street; Sam Hayward
- Head chef: Tony Pastor
- Location: 288 Fore Street, Portland, Cumberland County, Maine, 04101, United States
- Coordinates: 43°39′29″N 70°15′03″W
- Website: www.forestreet.biz

Fore Street is a restaurant at 288 Fore Street in the Old Port neighborhood of Portland, Maine, United States.

Owned by Dana Street and Sam Hayward, the restaurant opened in 1996. It was named one of Gourmet magazine's top 50 restaurants in the United States in 2002, being placed 16th on the list. Its former chef Hayward was named the top chef in the Northeastern US in 2004 by the James Beard Foundation. In 2002, The Atlantic magazine named Fore Street a "restaurant to build a trip around." In February 2011, Fore Street was nominated by the Beard Foundation for the award of 'Most Outstanding Restaurant'.

Dana Street owns three other businesses in the city: Street & Co., Standard Baking Co. (located in the same building as Fore Street) and Scales.

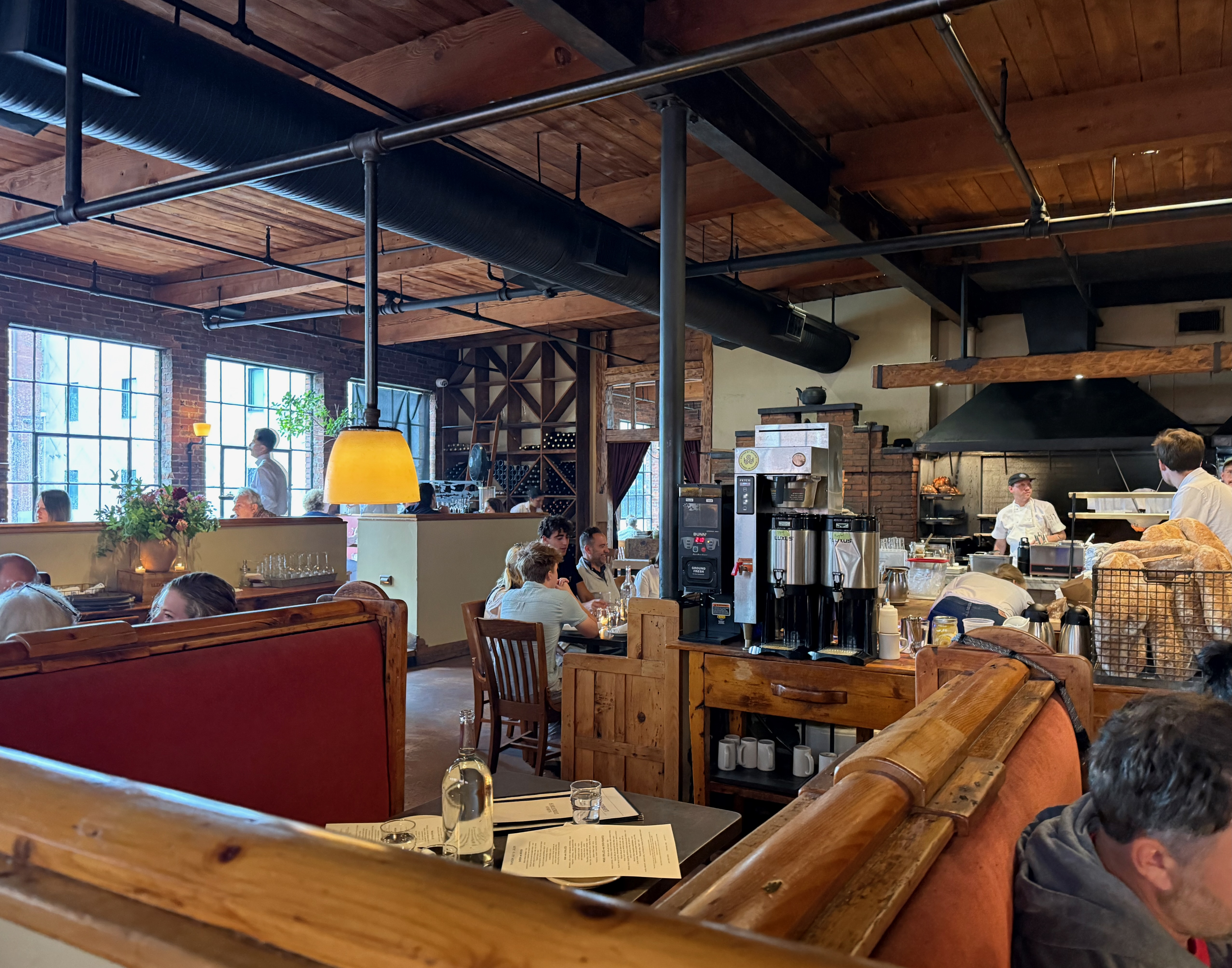
Interior (2025)

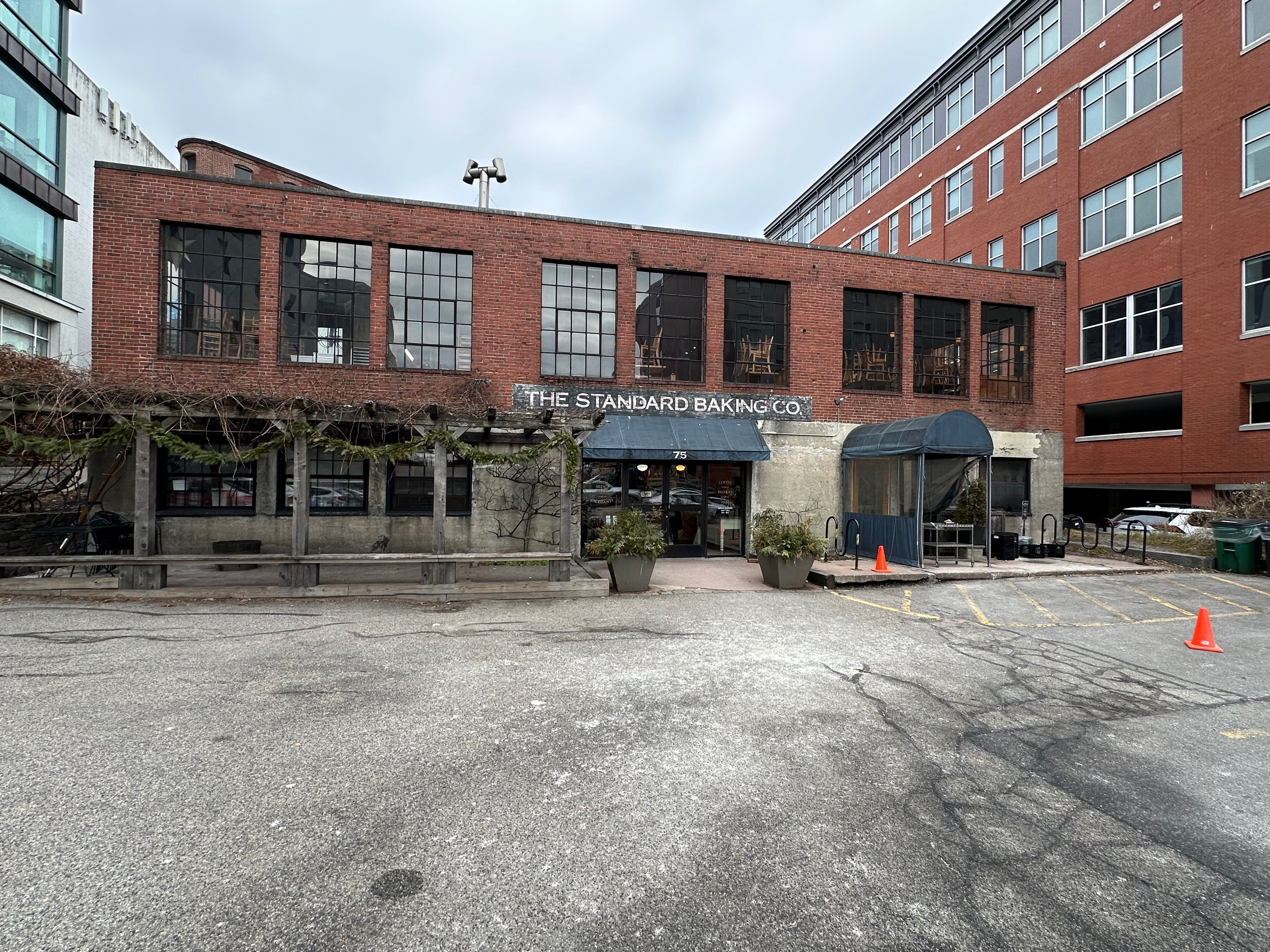
The lower rear of the building is occupied by Standard Baking Company in this 2024 photograph
