= Survive the Night (disambiguation) =

Survive the Night is a 2020 American action thriller film directed by Matt Eskandari.

Survive the Night may also refer to:

- Survive the Night (novel), a 2021 thriller novel by Riley Sager
- "Survive the Night", a 2022 song by Chris Brown from Breezy
- "Survive the Night", a 2022 song by The Boyz from Be Aware
