= Laurie Colwin =

American novelist (1944–1992)

Laurie Colwin (June 14, 1944 – October 24, 1992) was an American writer who wrote five novels, three collections of short stories and two volumes of essays and recipes. She was known for her portrayals of New York society and her food columns in Gourmet magazine. In 2012, the James Beard Foundation inducted her into its Cookbook Hall of Fame.

== Early life ==
Colwin was born in Manhattan, New York City, and grew up in Lake Ronkonkoma, on Long Island, Philadelphia and Chicago, the second child of Estelle Colwin (née Woolfson) and Peter Colwin. In Philadelphia, she attended the Cheltenham High School, which inducted her posthumously into its Hall of Fame in 1999.

== Career ==
From an early age, Colwin was a prolific writer. Her work first appeared in The New Yorker and, in 1974, her first collection of short stories was published. She was a regular contributor to Gourmet magazine and had articles in Mademoiselle, Allure, and Playboy. Her non-fiction books (Home Cooking and More Home Cooking) are collections of essays, and are as much memoirs as cookbooks. In the foreword to Home Cooking, Colwin wrote: "Even at her most solitary, a cook in the kitchen is surrounded by generations of cooks past, the advice and menus of cooks present, the wisdom of cookbook writers. In my kitchen I rely on Edna Lewis, Marcella Hazan, Jane Grigson, Elizabeth David, the numerous contributors to The Charleston Receipts, and Margaret Costa (author of an English book entitled The Four Seasons Cookery Book),"

In 2012, the James Beard Foundation posthumously inducted Colwin into their Cookbook Hall of Fame.

=== Works ===
Her published works include Passion and Affect (1974), Shine on, Bright and Dangerous Object (1975), Happy All the Time (1978), The Lone Pilgrim (1981), Wet (1974), Family Happiness (1982), Another Marvelous Thing (1988), Home Cooking (1988), Goodbye without Leaving (1990), More Home Cooking (1993), and A Big Storm Knocked It Over (1993). The PBS series American Playhouse adapted Colwin's short story An Old-Fashioned Story as a 90-minute film retitled Ask Me Again, which aired February 8, 1989.

Her last two books, More Home Cooking and A Big Storm Knocked It Over, were published posthumously. She also appears in Nancy Crampton's 2005 book of photography, Writers, which features Crampton's portraits of various literary figures.

== Personal life ==
In 1983, Colwin married Juris Jurjevics (died 2018), who was a novelist and cofounder of Soho Press. They had one child, RF Jurjevics, who became a technology professional and writer-illustrator.

Colwin died unexpectedly in 1992, in Manhattan, from an aortic aneurysm at the age of 48.

== Bibliography ==
=== Novels ===
- Shine On, Bright and Dangerous Object (Viking, 1975)
- Happy All the Time (Knopf, 1978)
- Family Happiness (Knopf, 1982)
- Another Marvelous Thing (Knopf, 1988)
- Goodbye Without Leaving (Poseidon Press, 1990)
- A Big Storm Knocked It Over (HarperCollins, 1993)

=== Stories ===
- Passion and Affect (Viking, 1974) aka Dangerous French Mistress and Other Stories
- The Lone Pilgrim (Knopf, 1981)

=== Food writing ===
- Home Cooking (Knopf, 1988)
- More Home Cooking (HarperCollins, 1993)

=== Short stories ===
Title	Publication	Collected in
"The Man Who Jumped Into the Water"	The New Yorker (December 20, 1969)	Passion and Affect
"The Elite Viewer"	Mademoiselle (September 1971)	Passion and Affect
"The Girl with the Harlequin Glasses"	Redbook (November 1971)	Passion and Affect
"The Big Plum"	Antaeus 5 (Spring 1972)	Passion and Affect
"A Road in Indiana"	Cosmopolitan (May 1972)	Passion and Affect
"The Smartest Woman in America"	Audience (September–October 1972)	Passion and Affect
"Animal Behavior"	The New Yorker (October 14, 1972)	Passion and Affect
"The Water Rats" aka "Man with a Gun"	Redbook (November 1972)	Passion and Affect
"Firing Jenny"	Mademoiselle (January 1973)	-
"Mr. Parker"	The New Yorker (April 14, 1973)	Passion and Affect
"Dangerous French Mistress"	Antaeus 10 (Summer 1973)	Passion and Affect
"Late Romantic"	Redbook (April 1974)	-
"Passion and Affect"	Passion and Affect (1974)	Passion and Affect
"Imelda"	Passion and Affect (1974)	Passion and Affect
"Children, Dogs, and Desperate Men"	Passion and Affect (1974)	Passion and Affect
"Wet"	Passion and Affect (1974)	Passion and Affect
"Travel"	The New Yorker (March 24, 1975)	The Lone Pilgrim
"The Lone Pilgrim"	The New Yorker (April 12, 1976)	The Lone Pilgrim
"The Smile Beneath the Smile"	Mademoiselle (November 1976)	The Lone Pilgrim
"An Old-Fashioned Story"	McCall's (March 1977)	The Lone Pilgrim
"A Girl Skating"	The New Yorker (May 30, 1977)	The Lone Pilgrim
"The Boyish Lover"	McCall's (January 1978)	The Lone Pilgrim
"Saint Anthony of the Desert" aka "An End to Innocence"	McCall's (April 1979)	The Lone Pilgrim
"Intimacy"	Cosmopolitan (March 1980)	The Lone Pilgrim
"Delia's Father"	Vogue (March 1981)	The Lone Pilgrim
"Sentimental Memory"	The Lone Pilgrim (1981)	The Lone Pilgrim
"A Mythological Subject"	The Lone Pilgrim (1981)	The Lone Pilgrim
"The Achieve of, the Mastery of the Thing"	The Lone Pilgrim (1981)	The Lone Pilgrim
"Family Happiness"	The Lone Pilgrim (1981)	The Lone Pilgrim
"My Mistress"	Playboy (March 1982)	Another Marvelous Thing
"Swan Song"	The New Yorker (April 18, 1983)	Another Marvelous Thing
"Frank and Billy"	Cosmopolitan (September 1983)	Another Marvelous Thing
"A Country Wedding"	The New Yorker (January 23, 1984)	Another Marvelous Thing
"French Movie"	Cosmopolitan (August 1984)	Another Marvelous Thing
"Another Marvelous Thing"	The New Yorker (February 11, 1985)	Another Marvelous Thing
"A Little Something"	New Woman (May 1985)	Another Marvelous Thing
"A Couple of Old Flames" aka "Old Flames"	The New Yorker (May 13, 1985)	Another Marvelous Thing
"Becoming Somebody's Mother"	Redbook (July 1990)	-
"Evensong"	The New Yorker (April 17, 2023)	-
