= Home Before Dark (disambiguation) =

Home Before Dark can refer to the following:

- Home Before Dark, the twenty-seventh studio album by American singer-songwriter Neil Diamond
- Home Before Dark (film), the 1958 motion picture
- Home Before Dark (TV series), an American mystery drama web television series
- Home Before Dark (novel), a 2020 thriller novel by Riley Sager
