= Final Girls =

2017 novel by Todd Ritter

- First edition
- Author: Riley Sager
- Audio read by: Erin Bennett
- Language: English
- Genre: Thriller
- Publisher: Dutton
- Publication date: June 14, 2017
- Publication place: United States
- Media type: Print (hardback, paperback) ebook audiobook
- Followed by: The Last Time I Lied

Final Girls is a 2017 thriller novel by Todd Ritter, writing under the penname Riley Sager.

== Synopsis ==
Ten years ago, Quincy Carpenter joined her friends in a vacation at Pinewood Cottage. The trip ended with a massacre, of which Quincy was the sole survivor. She was saved by Franklin “Coop” Cooper, the police officer who responded to the scene. Joe Hannen, an escaped mental patient who arrived at their camp, is blamed for the murders. The press dubs Quincy a "final girl," comparing her to two other final girls; Lisa Milner and Samantha "Sam" Boyd. Quincy is contacted by Lisa, and the two begin communicating with each other, albeit very infrequently. Lisa does not have a similar relationship with Sam.

Years later, Quincy is barely holding herself together, as she finds it hard to trust anyone other than Coop and her boyfriend Jeff. She is unable to remember anything from the night of the massacre. Her fragile living situation is thrown into an upheaval when she learns that Lisa has killed herself, and Sam arrives at her home. Sam is determined to make Quincy remember Pinewood Cottage, which puts Quincy on edge. They learn that Lisa's death had been ruled a homicide instead of suicide.

Though Quincy and Sam become friends, eventually Quincy is unsettled by Sam's odd behavior and starts questioning her motives. Quincy looks into Samantha Boyd, and the alias she claims to have used to stay off the radar, "Tina Stone". She makes contact with a sleazy journalist named Jonah Thompson who had requested comment from her previously, giving him Sam's alias in exchange for what information he had on her. When Quincy finds out that Sam was likely in Indianapolis with Lisa before she died, she travels to Lisa's home to see if anything can be found to tie Sam to Lisa's death. While searching Lisa's closet, she finds folders with details on Lisa's own case, Sam's, and Quincy's. Quincy soon realizes Sam had posed as Lisa to collect information on Quincy from people involved with the case. Feeling certain that Lisa had found out about Sam's duplicity, and Sam had killed her for it, Quincy returns home only to find Sam and Coop seemingly about to have sex.

Enraged, Quincy kicks Coop out and later leaves to talk to Coop at his motel. There, he confesses his longstanding love for Quincy, who gives in to his advances and the two have sex. In the morning, riddled with guilt, Quincy reaches out to Jonah again when she receives word that he has new information. There, she discovers that Tina Stone is actually "Sam's" true name, and that she had been impersonating Samantha Boyd the entire time to get close to Quincy. Quincy returns home to confront her, but Tina has drugged her usual drink. When Quincy awakes, Tina has driven them to Pinewood Cottage. Quincy manages to send a text to Coop for help before Tina forces her inside the cabin. Quincy's memories return — her boyfriend Craig cheating on her with her best friend Janelle, having sex with Joe Hannen in her rage and grief, stalking after Craig and Janelle with a knife only for Joe to stop her, leaving the knife in the forest and Janelle's later screams as she emerged from the woods, bloody and dying. She never saw the face of the man wielding the knife. It's revealed that Joe was Tina's only friend in the asylum, where she had been abused and mistreated, and she was seeking the truth of what happened that night and justice for Joe.

Quincy realizes that Joe hadn't been the killer. At that moment, Coop breaks in the room and shoots Tina, seemingly dead. Coop admits to having psychopathic tendencies and killing Lisa and the original Samantha Boyd. Quincy momentarily fools him into believing she loves him before stabbing him to death as he attempts to strangle her, and Tina is revealed to be alive still.

Months later, Quincy gets a SURVIVOR tattoo to match Tina's. News breaks of a massacre with only one teenage girl, Hayley, surviving. With the media already dubbing Hayley a new Final Girl, Quincy flies out to meet her, and help her work through her trauma of becoming a Final Girl like Lisa had once tried to do for her.

== Development ==
Ritter came up with the book's premise while watching Halloween on Halloween. He began to wonder what life would be like for a Final Girl years after the initial event, questioning "Do they think about it every day? Do they try to forget it? Can they ever truly trust anyone?". He briefly debated making it a YA novel, but decided against it.

== Release ==
Final Girls was released under the penname of Riley Sager, a gender neutral name. In later press coverage of the novel and author, media outlets noted that the official author website lacked an author photo and did not use gender pronouns when discussing Sager. Ritter and his agent chose to do this because "since we were looking for a new publisher, one could argue that editors would be willing to go with someone who had a clean slate, rather than a critically acclaimed author with a spotty sales record."

Final Girls was first published in hardback and ebook format on July 11, 2017, through Dutton. An audiobook adaptation narrated by Erin Bennett was released simultaneously through Penguin Audio. The novel was released in paperback on January 23, 2018, also through Dutton.

== Reception ==
Final Girls received praise from Stephen King, who called it “the first great thriller of 2017" and compared it favorably to Gone Girl. USA Today reviewed the book, stating that "It’s a page-turner with an intriguing premise, hampered only by bad writing and a general lack of literary merit."

=== Awards ===
- International Thriller Writers Awards for Best Hard Cover Novel (won, 2018)

== Adaptation ==
Plans for a film adaptation were announced in November 2017. Universal Pictures won the option rights for Final Girls and Nicole Clemens, Ashley Zalta, and Michael Sugar were attached as producers.

== See also ==
- The Final Girl Support Group, a 2021 novel with a similar premise
