= Give Me All Your Love (Magic Affair song) =

Single by Magic Affair

from the album Omen (The Story Continues...)
- Released: May 1994
- Genre: Eurodance
- Length: 3:51
- Label: Cologne Dance Label; EMI
- Songwriters: Swift; Breiter; Kempf
- Producer: Mike Staab

Magic Affair singles chronology
"Omen III" (1994)	"Give Me All Your Love" (1994)	"In the Middle of the Night" (1994)

Music video
- "Give Me All Your Love" on YouTube

"Give Me All Your Love" is a song recorded by German Eurodance band Magic Affair. It is the follow-up single to their acclaimed song "Omen III", and was released in 1994 via Cologne Dance Label as the second single from their debut studio album, Omen (The Story Continues...) (1994). It also broke away from the Omen theme and was a more pop-oriented track. The single was successful in many European countries, peaking at number three in Finland, number four in Denmark and number eight in both Sweden and Switzerland. In Germany, it peaked at number six and was certified gold for 250,000 records sold. German Sales stood at 400,000 copies in 1995. On the Eurochart Hot 100, "Give Me All Your Love" reached number 14. Rap parts are performed by AK Swift, and lead vocals by Franca Morgano.

== Critical reception ==
Mark Frith from Smash Hits spoke favorably of the song, writing, "If you think you're sick of the male rapper/female singer duos Europe is currently offering us, just wait until everyone comes back from their summer holidays talking about loads more of them. Then you really will know it. This will be one of the best: a Snap-esque, Sci-fi sounding electro vibe with a very impressive video."

== Music video ==
The accompanying music video for "Give Me All Your Love" was directed by Czar. It received active rotation on MTV Europe was A-listed on German music television channel VIVA in May and June 1994.

== Track listing ==
No.	Title	Writer(s)	Length
1.	"Give Me All Your Love" (Single Cut)	Swift, Breiter, Kempf	3:51
2.	"Give Me All Your Love" (Maxi Cut)	Swift, Breiter, Kempf	6:19
3.	"Homicidal"	Waldstädt	6:22

== Credits ==
- Co-producer – Breiter (tracks: 1 2), Kempf (tracks: 1 2)
- Design – Udo Poppinga, X-Space
- Lyrics – Swift, Breiter (tracks: 1 2), Kempf (tracks: 1 2)
- Music – Breiter (tracks: 1 2), Kempf (tracks: 1 2)
- Producer – Mike Staab

== Notes ==
- Tracks 1, 2: Recorded and mixed at BK Studio
- Published by Edition Nosferatu/BK Verlag
- Track 3: Recorded and mixed at Homeland Studios N.B. FFm
- Published by Edition Nosferatu
- Many Thanks to: Silke, Uli, Jesse B, M. Hosp, Blow and Traumi, Tillmann Uhrmacher.
- Special Thanks to: Helmut Fest, Erwin Bach, Donald Valbert, Thomas Weber, Bodo Krohn, Friedhelm Kaulen, Jörg Klaudies.
- Many special Thanks to: Ully Jonas, Peter Power, Marco Quirini, Monika Marcowitz, Charly Prick and VIVA Television for their outstanding support on OMEN III.
- From the forthcoming Album: Omen (The Story Continues...)

== Charts ==
=== Weekly charts ===
Chart (1994)	Peak position
Austria (Ö3 Austria Top 40)	13
Belgium (Ultratop 50 Flanders)	18
Denmark (IFPI)	4
Europe (Eurochart Hot 100)	14
Europe (European Dance Radio)	19
Finland (Suomen virallinen lista)	3
France (SNEP)	20
Germany (GfK)	6
Ireland (IRMA)	24
Netherlands (Dutch Top 40)	9
Netherlands (Single Top 100)	9
Scotland Singles (OCC)	27
Sweden (Sverigetopplistan)	8
Switzerland (Schweizer Hitparade)	8
UK Singles (OCC)	30
UK Dance (OCC)	34

=== Year-end charts ===
Chart (1994)	Position
Europe (Eurochart Hot 100)	89
Germany (Media Control)	48
Netherlands (Dutch Top 40)	87
Sweden (Topplistan)	65

== Certifications ==
Region	Certification	Certified units/sales
Germany (BVMI)	Gold	250,000^{^}
^{^} Shipments figures based on certification alone.
