= Bad Moon (Ritter novel) =

2011 book

- Author: Todd Ritter
- Language: English
- Genre: Mystery fiction
- Publisher: Minotaur
- Publication date: 11 October 2011
- Publication place: United States
- ISBN: 1429978171
- OCLC: 701806417
- Preceded by: Death Notice
- Followed by: Devil's Night

Bad Moon is a mystery novel written by Todd Ritter. It is the second novel in Ritter's Kat Campbell series and his second novel overall.

== Reception ==
Kirkus Reviews gave the novel a starred review, opining that it "draws you in irresistibly and doesn’t spit you out till the very end, your head spinning with surprising revelations." Publishers Weekly wrote: "Readers will find themselves ensnared by this unusual tale of love, loss, enduring pain, and betrayal." Carole Barrowman, writing for the McClatchy-Tribune News Service opined that Ritter has "crafted a stellar story with some didn't-see-them-coming twists." Mary Foster of the Associated Press wrote that while there are "some obvious plot problems", Ritter "moves the story along and keeps the action interesting."
