= In the Middle of the Night (Magic Affair song) =

1994 single by Magic Affair

Single by Magic Affair

from the album Omen (The Story Continues...)
- Released: 16 July 1994
- Length: 4:06
- Label: Cologne Dance Label; Electrola
- Composers: Stefan Stieber; Mike Staab; Rainer Kempf
- Lyricists: Rainer Kempf; AK Swift; Bernd Breiter
- Producer: Mike Staab

Magic Affair singles chronology
"Give Me All Your Love" (1994)	"In the Middle of the Night" (1994)	"Fire" (1994)

Music video
- "In the Middle of the Night" on YouTube

"In the Middle of the Night" is a song by German Eurodance band Magic Affair, released in July 1994 as the third single from their debut studio album, Omen (The Story Continues...) (1994). The raps are performed by American rapper AK Swift, and the lead vocals are sung by German singer Franca Morgano. The song peaked at number 10 in Finland, number 14 in Austria, and number 16 in both Germany and Sweden. On the Eurochart Hot 100, it reached number 34 in September 1994.

== Critical reception ==
Alan Jones from Music Week wrote, "Steamroller subtlety from the Teutonic techno team on a song with less substance than "The Omen", and following the well tried female singer/male rapper formula. A hit but probably not set for an extended run in the Top 40."

== Music video ==
The accompanying music video for "In the Middle of the Night" was directed by Manuela Hiller and Oliver Sommer. It was A-listed on Germany's VIVA in September 1994.

== Track listings ==
- 7-inch, UK (1994)
1. "In the Middle of the Night" (single edit) – 4:06
2. "In the Middle of the Night" (Midnight club mix) – 6:10
- 12-inch, Germany (1994)
1. "In the Middle of the Night" (maxi edit) – 6:20
2. "In the Middle of the Night" (Midnight club edit) – 6:10
- CD single, Germany (1994)
1. "In the Middle of the Night" (single edit) – 4:06
2. "In the Middle of the Night" (Maxi edit) – 6:20
- CD maxi-single, Germany (1994)
1. "In the Middle of the Night" (single edit) – 4:06
2. "In the Middle of the Night" (Maxi edit) – 6:20
3. "In the Middle of the Night" (Midnight club edit) – 6:10
- CD maxi-single, UK (1994)
1. "In the Middle of the Night" (club remix) – 4:57
2. "In the Middle of the Night" (303 State mix) – 5:25
3. "In the Middle of the Night" (Maxi edit) – 6:20
4. "In the Middle of the Night" (Work Out mix) – 5:52
5. "In the Middle of the Night" (Midnight club mix) – 6:10
- CD maxi-single (Remix), Germany (1994)
1. "In the Middle of the Night" (club re-mix) – 4:57
2. "In the Middle of the Night" (303 State mix) – 5:25
3. "In the Middle of the Night" (Work Out mix) – 5:52

== Charts ==
=== Weekly charts ===
Chart (1994)	Peak position
Austria (Ö3 Austria Top 40)	14
Belgium (Ultratop 50 Flanders)	39
Europe (Eurochart Hot 100)	34
Finland (Suomen virallinen lista)	10
France (SNEP)	26
Germany (GfK)	16
Netherlands (Dutch Top 40)	21
Netherlands (Single Top 100)	29
Scotland Singles (OCC)	34
Sweden (Sverigetopplistan)	16
UK Singles (OCC)	38
UK Club Chart (Music Week)	99

=== Year-end charts ===
Chart (1994)	Position
Netherlands (Dutch Top 40)	177
Sweden (Topplistan)	89

== Release history ==
Region	Date	Format(s)	Label(s)	Ref.
Germany	17 July 1994	CD	Cologne Dance Label; Electrola	
United Kingdom	24 October 1994	7-inch vinyl; 12-inch vinyl; CD; cassette	EMI	
