= Death Notice (Ritter novel) =

2010 book

- Author: Todd Ritter
- Language: English
- Genre: Mystery fiction
- Publisher: Minotaur
- Publication date: 12 October 2010
- Publication place: United States
- ISBN: 1429941480
- OCLC: 751738901
- Followed by: Bad Moon

Death Notice is a mystery novel written by Todd Ritter. His debut novel, it is the first entry in the Kat Campbell series.

== Reception ==
Kirkus Reviews opined that Ritter "has enough experience with both crime and obituaries to pen a convincingly blood-soaked debut novel." Jean Graham of The Star-Ledger called it a "well-wrought mystery with an abundance of twists, turns and red herrings." Publishers Weekly wrote that while the action "verges on pulp fiction melodrama" and the conclusion "fully lives up—or down—to that standard", Ritter "treats his main characters—sympathetic, believably vulnerable people—with respect." Stephanie Zvirin of Booklist called it a "well-wrought mystery with an abundance of twists, turns and red herrings."
