= Garlic and Sapphires =

2005 memoir by Ruth Reichl

Garlic and Sapphires: The Secret Life of a Critic in Disguise
- Author: Ruth Reichl
- Genre: Memoir, food writing
- Set in: New York City
- Publisher: Penguin Press
- Publication date: 2005

Garlic and Sapphires: The Secret Life of a Critic in Disguise is a 2005 memoir by Ruth Reichl describing her tenure as restaurant critic for The New York Times. It also includes some recipes and reprints some of Reichl's columns for the Times. The book was received favorably by critics and became a New York Times best seller.

== Writing and publication ==
Reichl began the book during a MacDowell residency. It was published in 2005 by Penguin Press.

== Synopsis ==
Garlic and Sapphires recounts Reichl's 1993 move from the Los Angeles Times, where she was a restaurant critic and editor, to become head restaurant critic of The New York Times. Seated next to a waitress on the flight to New York, Reichl learns that the city's restaurants have been on the lookout for her in her newly powerful role and she finds that she receives special treatment as a consequence. In order to visit restaurants without being recognized, she enlists Claudia, an acting teacher and friend of Reichl's late mother, to help her devise disguises. Reichl takes on a series of different personas, which allows her different perspectives on specific restaurants as well as her own personality as she steps into someone else's shoes. Times Living section secretary Carol Shaw often accompanies her on her outings and the book also follows the development of their friendship. They visit high-end restaurants like Rocco DiSpirito's Union Pacific as well as less recognized cuisine, exploring the Chinese food of Flushing, Queens. These experiences are interspersed with recipes and reprints of Reichl's reviews for the Times. The book concludes with Shaw's death and Reichl's departure from the Times to become the editor-in-chief role at Gourmet magazine in 1999, ending her days as a restaurant critic.

== Reception ==
Garlic and Sapphires received a starred review in Publishers Weekly. In The Washington Post, Jonathan Yardley called it a "wonderful book, which is funny -- at times laugh-out-loud funny -- and smart and wise." In The Guardian, Jay Rayner praised Reichl as "a writer who happens to be filing dispatches on food, rather than a restaurant expert who happens to have been given the opportunity to write about them. She is both self-aware and not above burying the (steak) knife deep between the shoulders of those who deserve it."

The book became a New York Times best seller.
