= Magic Affair =

German Eurodance band

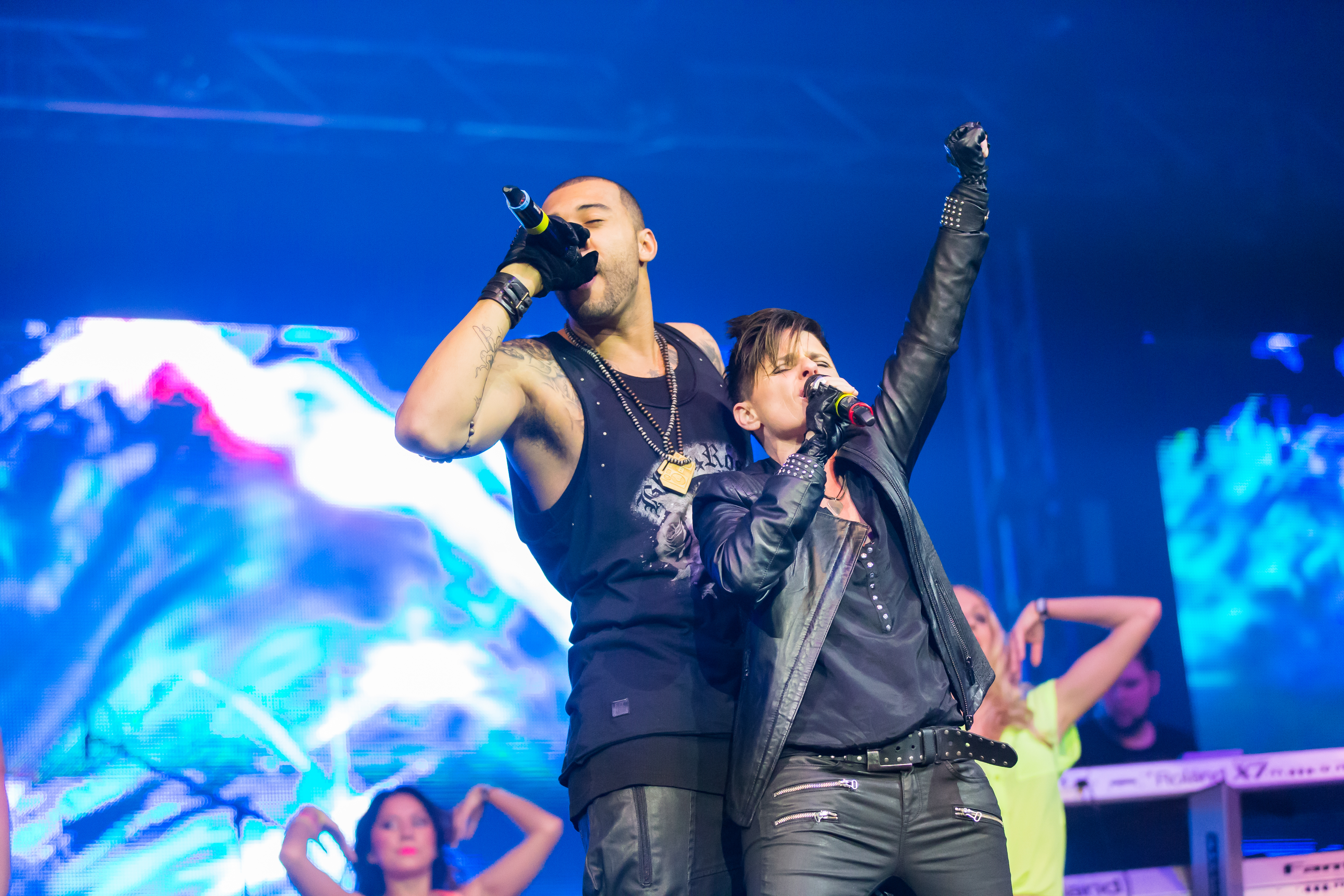
- Magic Affair in 2014

Background information
- Also known as: M.A.
- Origin: Frankfurt, Germany
- Genres: Eurodance, Hip hop
- Years active: 1993–present
- Labels: CDL; EMI; Nosferatu
- Members: Franca Morgano (1993–1995, 2004–present); Nitro (2013–present)
- Past members: Burnell Keith Herring (1993–1994, 2008–2013); Alfonso Daniel Morgan (1994); Anita Davis (1995–1997); Jannet Schüttler (1995–1996); Richard Michael Smith (1996–1997)
- Website: Official website

Magic Affair is a German Eurodance project that originated in Frankfurt, Germany, in 1993, created by music producer Mike Staab. German singer Franca Morgano and American rapper Burnell Keith Herring (A.K. Swift) were the project's initial front members. Magic Affair is best known across Europe for its hit singles "Omen III", "Give Me All Your Love", and "In the Middle of the Night", as well as the album Omen (The Story Continues...). To date, the project has sold 2.5 million records in Germany and over 8 million records worldwide.

== Band history ==
=== 1993–94: Formation and Omen (The Story Continues...) ===
Magic Affair was created by producer Mike Staab as a spin-off from the group Mysterious Art, where Staab was both a member and producer. German singer Franca Morgano and American rapper Burnell Keith Herring (A.K. Swift) fronted the act. The first single, "Omen III," was released in 1993 under the shortened group name M.A. The single achieved success in Europe and internationally, reaching No. 1 in Germany. "Omen III" later attained Platinum status in Germany and Gold in Austria. The single also peaked at No. 17 on the UK Singles Chart. "Omen III" was followed in 1994 by the debut studio album Omen (The Story Continues...) and three singles: "Give Me All Your Love", "In the Middle of the Night", and "Fire", which peaked at No. 6, No. 16, and No. 20 on the German singles chart, respectively. At the end of 1994, Herring was briefly replaced by Alfonso Daniel Morgan due to internal issues between Morgano and Herring. However, Herring returned shortly after, and nothing was recorded with Morgan.

=== 1995–97: Departure of Morgano and Herring and Phenomenia ===
In February 1995, both Morgano and Herring were fired and replaced by two female singers, Anita Davis and Jannet De Lara (Jannet Schüttler). With the new lineup and a shift toward a more pop-oriented sound, which included female verses and excluded male raps, Magic Affair released the single "The Rhythm Makes You Wanna Dance" in 1995, ahead of their second studio album. This was followed in 1996 by the album Phenomenia and two singles, "Energy of Light," co-written by Daisy Dee, and "World of Freedom." These singles became moderate hits, peaking at No. 37 on the Swiss Singles Chart and No. 15 on the Finnish Singles Chart, respectively. Singer Lori Glori provided guest vocals on the album track "Magical Love Affair."

In September 1996, Schüttler was fired and replaced by the rapper Ras-Ma-Taz (Richard A. Smith), previously of E-Rotic and S.E.X. Appeal. With the third line-up, the group also appeared on the Queen tribute compilation album Queen Dance Traxx, with the song "Bohemian Rhapsody", which also saw a single release. The tribute album also featured another Queen song, "We Are The Champions", recorded with all artists who participated on Queen Dance Traxx as a supergroup labeled as "Acts United". Meanwhile, Morgano and Herring formed their own band called Blaxone and released a single, "Good Times", in 1996, which was later credited as a Magic Affair song in 2008 and included in Magic Affair's remix album series Remixcollection I-III. In 1997, two more singles were released: the fourth and final single from "Phenomenia," titled "Break These Chains," which had a different single edition with additional raps by Smith, and the new song "Night of the Raven," which was the first single released on the new Dutch label CNR and the first single for the planned but never materialized third studio album. "Night of the Raven" became a minor hit, peaking at #54 in the Swedish Singles Chart. After this release, Davis and Smith both left the band. In 1997, Herring launched his solo career.

=== 1998–99: Single releases and hiatus ===
In 1998 and 1999, the promotional singles "Sacrifice," an instrumental trance track without vocalists, and "Miracles" were released, both without major chart success. After these single releases, Magic Affair went on hiatus. Meanwhile, Davis launched her solo career, released several solo singles, and formed her girl group The Clarkettes alongside singers Brenda Hale and Brooke Russell.

=== 2004–07: Return of Morgano and brief comeback ===
After a short absence, Magic Affair briefly returned in 2004 with the single release "Fly Away (La Serenissima)" alongside a music video. This single also marked the return of original lead singer Morgano to Magic Affair. "Fly Away (La Serenissima)" reached #13 in the German DJ Playlist and peaked at #70 in the Swiss Singles Chart. In 2007, former member Schüttler was featured on guest vocals on Raul Rincon & Coronabros's single "La Verdad".

=== 2008–12: Return of Herring and comeback ===
In 2008, a remix album series entitled "Remixcollection I - 1993-1994," "Remixcollection II - 1995-1996," and "Remixcollection III - 1996-1998" was digitally released, containing most remixes from the mentioned eras. Also in 2008, the single "Stigmata (Of Love)," originally an unreleased song recorded back in 2003, was released. "Stigmata (Of Love)" marked the return of original rapper Herring to Magic Affair, although he was only credited as a featured artist on the single as the narrator. Alongside the single, a promotional version of Magic Affair's very first hit "Omen III" was released in 2008 with new mixes by The Nightshifterz, Pussylickerz, Dirty Boyz, and Blackzone. In addition to these Magic Affair releases, Morgano released her first solo album titled "Bleeding Love Songs (Italian American Songbook)." In 2009, Morgano and Herring performed "Omen III" live at RTL Ultimative Chart Show for the first time in years. Magic Affair was working on a third studio album, produced by Mike Staab, Rainer Kempf, and Bernd Waldstadt; however, the project was ultimately canceled due to Mike Staab's death in May 2009. In 2010, Morgano released her second studio album "You Want It" and the compilation album "Remember Me." In 2012, Morgano released her first holiday album, "Christmas Part I."

=== 2013–present: Second departure of Herring ===
In 2013, Herring left Magic Affair again and was replaced by German rapper Nitro, previously of the hip hop collective Brothers Keepers. Meanwhile, Morgano released her third, fourth overall, and first German-language studio album ...Nach dem Sturm ("...After the Storm"). In 2014, Morgano and Nitro introduced the single "Hear the Voices," along with another new song, the B-side "We're Insane." In 2022, Magic Affair released a cover of "Rebel Yell" by Billy Idol.

== Members ==
Member	1993	1994	1995	1996	1997	1998	1999	2000	2004	2005	2008	2009	2010	2011	2012	2013	2014
Franca Morgano (1993–1995, 2004, 2008–present)																	
Anita Davis (1995–1997)																	
Jannet Schüttler (1995–1996)																	
Burnell Keith Herring (1993–1995, 2008–2013)																	
Richard Michael Smith (1996–1997)																	
Nitro (2013–present)																	

Other members:

- Alfonso Daniel Morgan (brief replacement for Herring in 1994, but no material had been released)

== Discography ==
=== Studio albums ===
Title	Details	Peak chart positions					
Title	Details	AUT	FIN	GER	NED	SWE	SWI
Omen (The Story Continues...)	Release date: 16 May 1994; Label: CDL; Formats: CD	11	9	8	71	18	7
Phenomenia	Release date: August 1996; Label: CDL; Formats: CD	—	—	99	—	—	—
"—" denotes studio album that did not chart.

=== Remix albums ===
- 2008: Remixcollection I - 1993-1994
- 2008: Remixcollection II - 1995-1996
- 2008: Remixcollection III - 1996-1998

=== Singles ===
Year	Single	Peak chart positions									Certifications (sales thresholds)	Album
Year	Single	AUT	FIN	FRA	GER	IRE	NED	SWE	SWI	UK	Certifications (sales thresholds)	Album
1993	"Omen III"	2	2	12	1	14	7	3	3	17	AUT: Gold; GER: Platinum	Omen (The Story Continues...)
1994	"Give Me All Your Love"	13	3	20	6	24	9	8	8	30	GER: Gold	Omen (The Story Continues...)
1994	"In the Middle of the Night"	14	10	26	16	—	29	16	—	38		Omen (The Story Continues...)
1994	"Fire"	17	9	—	20	—	—	34	23	—		Omen (The Story Continues...)
1995	"The Rhythm Makes You Wanna Dance"	32	17	—	54	—	—	36	—	—		Phenomenia
1996	"Energy of Light"	—	—	—	54	—	—	—	37	—		Phenomenia
1996	"World of Freedom"	—	15	—	—	—	—	—	—	—		Phenomenia
1997	"Break These Chains"	—	—	—	—	—	—	—	—	—		Phenomenia
1997	"Night of the Raven"	—	—	—	—	—	—	54	—	—		Non-album singles
2004	"Fly Away (La Serenissima)"	—	—	—	—	—	—	—	70	—		Non-album singles
2008	"Stigmata (Of Love)"	—	—	—	—	—	—	—	—	—		Non-album singles
2014	"Hear the Voices"	—	—	—	—	—	—	—	—	—		Non-album singles
2022	"Rebel Yell"	—	—	—	—	—	—	—	—	—		Non-album singles
"—" denotes singles that did not chart.

=== Promotional singles ===
Title	Year	Peak chart positions	Album
Title	Year	GER	Album
"Good Times" (Note: "Good Times" has been released in 1996 by Morgano and Herring as Blaxone, but later in 2008 credited as Magic Affair and included on Magic Affair's remix album series "Remixcollection I-III".)	1996	—	N/A
"Bohemian Rhapsody"	1996	—	Queen Dance Traxx
"Sacrifice"	1998	—	N/A
"Miracles"	1999	—	N/A
"Omen III (2008 version)"	2008	—	N/A
"—" denotes promotional single that did not chart.

=== Other appearances ===
- 1996: "We Are the Champions" (as part of the supergroup Acts United on the album Queen Dance Traxx)
