= The Only One Left =

2023 novel by Riley Sager

- First edition (US)
- Author: Riley Sager
- Language: English
- Genre: Thriller
- Publisher: Penguin (US)
- Publication date: 2023
- Publication place: United States
- Media type: Print, ebook
- Pages: 400 pages
- ISBN: 9780593183229 First edition hardback
- Preceded by: The House Across the Lake
- Followed by: Middle of the Night

The Only One Left is a 2023 murder mystery/horror novel by American author Todd Ritter, writing under the pen name Riley Sager. The plot concerns a woman who takes a job caring for elderly invalid Lenora Hope, who was accused decades ago of murdering her parents and younger sister. She slowly unravels the truth behind the Hope murders and a missing nurse.

== Plot ==
Kittredge "Kit" McDeere is a 30-something caregiver accused of fatally overdosing her mother, who was dying of stomach cancer. Because of this Kit is unable to find work until she is hired as a home health aide by Lenora Hope, an elderly woman who was also accused of murdering her family. Lenora's prior aide, Mary, went missing a week prior. Once at the mansion Kit meets the other servants: the housekeeper Mrs. Baker, chef Archie, maid Jessie, and the groundskeeper Carter, who believes that he is the illegitimate grandson of Lenora Hope and the heir to the Hope family fortune.

At Lenora's request Kit begins typing out the history of the Hope family and particularly Lenora's relationship with her sister Virginia, which Lenora cannot do as she is mute and almost completely paralyzed, save for her left hand. Kit later discovers Mary's corpse and realizes that she was murdered after discovering that Lenora had been impregnated by a man named Ricky. She also learns that Mrs. Baker is the true Lenora and that her employer is actually Virginia, who was the true mother of the child. The real Mrs. Baker was sent by the sisters' parents to live in Canada with the baby, who died in 1982 after having a child of his own. Upon further questioning, Lenora states that she forced a paralyzed Virginia to assume her identity and bribed a doctor to declare Virginia dead. She then used the trust funds to travel the world while "Lenora" was blamed for their parents' deaths.

Later, during a drive with Carter, Kit learns that Mary had performed a paternity test on Carter and found that he was not related to the Hope family. She begins to suspect that Carter murdered Mary and kicks him out of the car before fleeing to her family home. Kit meets her father and has the further revelation that he, Patrick McDeere, was "Ricky", the father of Virginia's child.

The narration then switches to Virginia, who reveals that neither she nor Lenora murdered their parents. Their mother had stabbed their father while defending Virginia, after the woman learned that he had paid off Ricky and sent the baby to Canada. Ricky, who had been present, had fled to the home's grand stairway with Virginia, where her mother goads Ricky into killing her. Devastated, Virginia tries to hang herself but is discovered by Lenora, who assumed she killed their parents. Lenora alters the scene to make it appear as if Virginia was murdered. The police arrive and find that Virginia is still alive, but paralyzed and mute due to damage to her spine and throat.

In present day, Patrick goes to the house to kill Virginia, as she is the only one who knows that he committed murder, but is stopped by Lenora. Patrick confesses that he was the one who helped his wife commit suicide and that Kit is innocent. The cliff on which the home sits begins to collapse. Patrick and Lenora help Kit and Virginia escape the home before walking back in to die in house as it falls into the sea.

Virginia goes to live with Kit. Three months later, Virginia leaves Kit's home without notice. A few months go by when Kit receives a letter from Virginia, explaining that she was in fact, not paralyzed and had full bodily function since four months after she tried to kill herself. She reveals that she has left to travel the world with Jessie - her granddaughter by her long-lost son. Along with the letter, Virginia sends two tickets to Paris, one for Kit and one for Archie. Kit remains Virginia's friend and travel companion until Virginia dies at the age of 101. The novel ends with Virginia Hope's obituary.

== Release ==
The Only One Left was published on June 20, 2023.

== Reception ==
Reviewers noted the strong influences of the Lizzie Borden incident, Daphne du Maurier's novel Rebecca, and Edgar Allan Poe's short story "The Fall of the House of Usher".

Early reviews were generally positive. Becky Meloan in The Washington Post called it "hair-raising" and "edge-of-your-seat entertainment", while Publishers Weekly approved of its "jaw-dropping twists" and called it a "superior nail-biter". Book critic Felecia Wellington Radel, writing in USA Today, felt the characters and Hope's End itself were some of the best parts of the book, and called the book a "thrilling page-turner".

Other reviews were less supportive. Danielle Trussoni in The New York Times called the novel "a dizzying Gothic whodunit" and a "propulsive mystery". She wrote that the book had "Sager’s signature breakneck pace" but also pointed to plot twists that "stretch believability".
