= Gourmet's Adventures with Ruth =

- Genre: Cooking
- Presented by: Ruth Reichl
- Country of origin: United States
- Original language: English
- No. of seasons: 1

Original release
- Network: PBS
- Release: October 17, 2009

Gourmet's Adventures With Ruth is a cooking program that is produced by WGBH-TV and aired nationally on the Public Broadcasting Service (PBS) in the United States. The show follows former Gourmet magazine Editor in Chief Ruth Reichl around the USA and the rest of world, where in the company of various celebrities, the program instructs the viewer about different countries and regions and their cuisines.

== Overview ==
The show is an extension of the Gourmet brand, following the closure of Gourmet magazine on October 5, 2009, after 68 years of publication. According to Mike Hale, it continues the magazine's "conjunction of a fastidious, locavore approach to food and a lush, almost sybaritic approach to its consumption."

== Episodes ==
For the series premiere, Reichl and actress Frances McDormand traveled to Blackberry Farm, where they go fly-fishing, beekeeping, and cook Southern recipes. In other episodes, Reichl travels to Marrakesh, Morocco, for lessons on couscous and tagines with Lorraine Bracco and then to Bath, England, to learn the secrets of homemade bread with Dianne Wiest. Then she fishes in Seattle with Tom Skerritt and explores New York City's Indian community with Jeffrey Wright.

== Critical reaction ==
Mike Hale in The New York Times said the program had a tendency to "artlessly meander", but felt that in its refusal to compromise the magazine's values it would appeal to the same core followers; other viewers might find it a "glossy anachronism" and prefer simpler, more modern cooks like Rachael Ray.
