= Things Half in Shadow =

- Author: Alan Finn
- Language: English
- Genre: Historical fiction, Mystery fiction
- Publisher: Gallery Books
- Publication date: 2014
- Publication place: United States
- ISBN: 1476761736
- OCLC: 902854253

Things Half in Shadow is a historical mystery novel written by Todd Ritter under the pseudonym Alan Finn. His only novel published under that pseudonym, it follows crime reporter and Civil War veteran Edward Clarke and fraudulent medium Lucy Collins as they investigate the murder of medium Lenora Grimes, which occurs during a séance.

== Reception ==
Jacqueline Cutler of The Star-Ledger called the novel "terrific" and a "delicious yarn", praising the "intricate" plotting, the "surprising" twists, the setting and the lack of padding in spite of its length. Vince Liaguno of Lambda Literary opined that Ritter "precisely re-creates the nuances of the period on the page" and "deftly straddles multiple genres–from historical fiction to mystery to horror–without losing an ounce of cohesion", calling it "so expertly assembled" that the "conclusion is both satisfying and faithful to what's come before it." Jeff Westerhoff of Historical Novel Society wrote that he "found the storyline exciting, with drama that resulted in a solidly paced and engaging story."
