= Omen (The Story Continues...) =

Studio album by Magic Affair
- Released: 16 May 1994
- Length: 1:02:36
- Labels: Bertelsmann Club 35229 4 Cologne Dance Label 7243 8 29698 2 2 Electrola 7243 8 29698 2 2
- Producer: Mike Staab

Magic Affair chronology
Omen (The Story Continues...) (1994)	Phenomenia (1995)

Singles from Omen
- 1. "Omen III" Released: 13 December 1993; 2. "Give Me All Your Love" Released: 2 May 1994; 3. "In The Middle Of The Night" Released: 16 July 1994; 4. "Fire" Released: 29 October 1994

Professional ratings
Review scores
Source	Rating
Music Week	3/5 stars

Omen (The Story Continues...) is the debut studio album by German Eurodance project Magic Affair. It was initially released on 16 May 1994 via Cologne Dance Label. The record also produced four singles, with the lead single "Omen III" becoming a big success in many European countries. The album continues the direction of the band's previous record Omen - The Story released in 1989 under name Mysterious Art; its first two singles were "Das Omen (Teil 1)" and "Carma (Omen 2)". Sales of the album exceeded 250,000 copies in 1995.

== Track listing ==
No.	Title	Length
1.	"The Commutation"	2:45
2.	"Omen III (Single Edit)"	3:56
3.	"In the Middle of the Night"	6:20
4.	"Homicidal"	6:22
5.	"Fire"	6:07
6.	"Water of Sin"	4:59
7.	"Under the Sea"	1:55
8.	"Carry On"	6:01
9.	"Make Your Mind Up"	5:37
10.	"Give Me All Your Love"	6:19
11.	"Wonderland"	5:04
12.	"Thin Line"	4:29
13.	"Fall Out"	2:18
14.	"Fire" (Trance Mix)	6:26

== Credits ==
- Co-producer – Bernd Breiter, Bernd Waldstädt, Rainer Kempf
- Mastering – Dave Bell
- Producer – Mike Staab

== Chart performance ==
Chart (1994)	Peak position
Ö3 Austria Top 40	11
Dutch Albums Chart	71
Finnish Albums Chart	9
German Media Control Charts	8
Hungarian Albums (MAHASZ)	17
Swedish Albums Chart	18
Swiss Albums Chart	7
