= Devil's Night (novel) =

2013 book

- Author: Todd Ritter
- Language: English
- Genre: Mystery fiction
- Publisher: Minotaur
- Publication date: 20 August 2013
- Publication place: United States
- ISBN: 125002854X
- OCLC: 811597849
- Preceded by: Bad Moon

Devil's Night is a mystery novel written by Todd Ritter. It is the third entry in his Kat Campbell series and his third novel overall.

== Reception ==
Kirkus Reviews stated: "Kat's third shakes up her love life and offers a twisty mystery with enough suspects to keep you guessing to the bitter end." Publishers Weekly called the novel "satisfying" and opined that Ritter "smoothly blends history and mystery, tragedy and near-tragedy". Teresa L. Jacobsen of the Library Journal stated: " Ritter's thriller series is just right for those who love a story told in a 24-hour frame in which tons of improbable deeds transpire."
