= Lock Every Door =

2019 novel by Todd Ritter

- First edition
- Author: Riley Sager
- Audio read by: Dylan Moore
- Language: English
- Genre: Thriller
- Publisher: Dutton
- Publication date: 2019
- Publication place: United States
- Media type: Print (hardback, paperback) ebook audiobook
- Pages: 384 pages
- ISBN: 1524745146 First edition hardcover
- Preceded by: The Last Time I Lied
- Followed by: Home Before Dark

Lock Every Door is a 2019 thriller novel by American author Todd Ritter, writing under the pen name of Riley Sager. The plot concerns an apartment sitter at an exclusive building in Manhattan who discovers that her predecessor in the job disappeared under suspicious circumstances. The novel made the New York Times Bestseller List for July 21, 2019 and a television adaptation is planned.

== Synopsis ==
Jules Larsen has lost her family, her job, and her boyfriend and is now living with her best friend, Chloe, in New York City. With no job prospects, Jules answers a job posting for an apartment sitter in an exclusive building called The Bartholomew. Property manager and longtime resident Leslie Evelyn explains that the former occupant has died, but they cannot let an apartment sit empty due to fear of burglars. She explains that Jules will live in the apartment for three months, for which she will be paid $12,000. Ms. Evelyn cautions Jules against interactions with the other residents and warns her not to bring outsiders into the building.

Jules moves in and meets the other residents, including fellow sitters Dylan and Ingrid, handsome "Dr. Nick," and the irascible author Greta Manville, whose novel features The Bartholomew on its cover.

Jules learns the building has a checkered history, including the murder of a servant girl by another resident, the suicide of the original builder, and the disappearances of other apartment sitters. Among these is Erica Mitchell, who had previously stayed in Apartment 12A before her. Jules grows even more suspicious after Ingrid goes missing. She enlists Dylan's help to seek out the truth until Dylan also vanishes.

Jules discovers that Marjorie Milton - the occupant of 12A that Leslie Evelyn claimed had died - is in fact alive. She tracks the woman down, but cannot convince her to reveal any information. Jules finds Ingrid living in a homeless shelter and they compare notes. Combining Ingrid's knowledge with her own research, Jules comes to believe that the building owners are part of a satanic group called the Golden Chalice and that the missing people were used as sacrifices to lengthen their lifespans.

Terrified, Jules flees The Bartholomew, but is hit by a car and hospitalized. She tries to explain what has happened to the hospital staff, only to discover that the hospital is inside The Bartholomew and run by Dr Nick, who is revealed as the great-grandson of the founder. Dr. Nick informs her that the true purpose of the building is not devil worship, but organ harvesting. Wealthy people buy apartments and hire sitters with the intention of using them as unwitting donors. While she was unconscious, Jules herself "donated" one kidney and recipients have already been selected for her liver and heart.

When left unattended, Jules lights her bed on fire using a lighter dropped by one of the nurses. In the ensuing chaos, she escapes from the building. After the fire has been extinguished, the police investigate the building and uncover the scheme. As a result many celebrities and former residents of the building are either arrested or commit suicide and the building itself is demolished.

== Release ==
Lock Every Door was first published in the United States in hardback and ebook format on July 2, 2019 through Dutton Publishing. An audiobook adaptation narrated by Dylan Moore was released on the same day through Penguin Audio. Dutton also released a paperback edition of Lock Every Door on May 5, 2020.

== Television series ==
In July 2019 Paramount Television, Sugar 23, and Anonymous Content announced plans to adapt Lock Every Door into a television series. Brian Buckner will serve as an executive producer and writer for the series while Angela Robinson has been announced as director.

== Reception ==
Lock Every Door received reviews from outlets such as the Wall Street Journal and NY Journal of Books, the former of which stated that Sager "relates ominous events and spooky developments with skill, adding an element of social commentary and a surprise twist ending—elevating this exercise in terror above the ordinary shocker." Oline Cogdill, writing for the Associated Press, drew favorable comparisons between the novel and Ira Levin's Rosemary's Baby, noting that Sager dedicated the book to Levin. The Virginian-Pilot also wrote a favorable review.
