= The Last Time I Lied =

2018 novel by Todd Ritter

- First edition
- Author: Riley Sager
- Audio read by: Nicol Zanzarella
- Language: English
- Genre: Thriller
- Publisher: Dutton
- Publication date: 2018
- Publication place: United States
- Media type: Print (hardback, paperback) ebook audiobook
- Pages: 384 pages
- ISBN: 1524743070 First edition hardcover
- Preceded by: Final Girls
- Followed by: Lock Every Door

The Last Time I Lied is a 2018 thriller novel by American author Todd Ritter under the pen name Riley Sager. The plot concerns the reopening of a summer camp from which three girls disappeared 15 years before. Their former roommate, now a counselor, attempts to solve the disappearance while dealing with her own survivor guilt. The novel was inspired by the classic Australian film Picnic at Hanging Rock. It received favorable reviews and reached the New York Times Bestseller List.

== Plot ==
Fifteen years ago, three girls named Vivian, Natalie, and Allison snuck out of their cabin at Camp Nightingale, a prestigious summer camp for the wealthy, and were never seen again. Their fellow camper, Emma, was the last to see them alive. Their disappearance stuck with Emma throughout her life and now, as an artist, she includes pieces of that past in all of her artwork. At one of Emma's showings, she meets the owner of Camp Nightingale, old money socialite Francesca Harris-White, who plans to reopen the camp and hires Emma to work as an art counselor.

Once back at the camp, Emma meets three new campers, Miranda, Sasha, and Krystal, who remind her of the original three girls. When Emma discovers a surveillance camera outside her cabin door, Francesca's adopted son, Theo Harris-White, explains that the family knows Emma's history of trauma and had the camp groundskeeper place it there for her safety. In anger, Emma reveals that 15 years ago, she falsely accused Theo of being behind the disappearance of the original trio. At the time, she had a crush on Theo and became jealous when she found him having sex with Vivian. Theo's brother Chet sympathizes with Emma and reveals that, like her, Theo was traumatized by the events of 15 years before.

In her spare time, Emma delves into the mystery of what happened to the original campers. In the process, she discovers that Camp Nightingale was built on the site of a former women's insane asylum known as Peaceful Valley. Emma theorizes that the girls, who were also researching the camp's history, may have discovered something which led to their disappearance. She suspects that the family may be hiding a secret.

One night, Miranda, Sasha, and Krystal disappear in circumstances similar to the original girls. Suspicion focuses on Emma, who was caught on camera leaving the cabin five minutes after them. Emma is questioned by Police Detective Nathan Flynn, who makes it clear she is his prime suspect. Emma confronts the family, who insist there is nothing untoward in the history of either the asylum or the camp.

Emma sneaks out during the night and finds Miranda, Sasha, and Krystal trapped in a remote area of the woods. After rescuing them, she runs back to camp and is found by Chet, who attacks her. Chet reveals that he kidnapped the girls and framed Emma as revenge for her having accused Theo of the disappearance of Vivian, Natalie, and Allison. He takes her to the ruins of the Peaceful Valley Asylum, now underwater, with the intention of leaving her there. They discover the remains of several human bodies before Theo rescues Emma.

The following police investigation recovers the remains of Natalie and Allison, along with proof that they were murdered. Months later, Vivian appears at one of Emma's art shows and reveals that she murdered them. The girls were present when Vivian's sister drowned, but made no move to save her, so she killed them as an act of revenge. Emma paints a portrait of Vivian and sends it to law enforcement and the media so that Vivian may be caught.

== Development ==
Author Todd Ritter came up with the idea for The Last Time I Lied after viewing the film Picnic at Hanging Rock and thinking "Yes, this is it: girls vanish into the woods, never to be seen again, and it messes everyone up. That’s my next book.” He had initially intended to not include flashbacks, as he used this as a plot device in the last book, but that "the past just kept coming back in these chapters, and it came to the point where I just needed to do flashbacks, there’s just no way around it."

== Release ==
The Last Time I Lied was first published in hardback and ebook format in the United States on July 3, 2018, through Dutton. An audiobook adaptation narrated by Nicol Zanzarella was released simultaneously through Penguin Audio.

The book has been published in the United Kingdom and has been translated into Chinese and German.

== Reception ==
Upon release, Booklist called The Last Time I Lied "tense and twisty" and deemed it superior to Ritter's first novel, Final Girls. It reached the New York Times Bestseller List for the week of July 22, 2018. In The New York Times Alafair Burke wrote that "in the end, the author delivers the kind of unpredictable conclusion that all thriller readers crave — utterly shocking yet craftily foreshadowed. For some readers, though, these might be the only pages that linger." The Wall Street Journal also reviewed the book.
