= Street & Co. =

- Interactive map of Street & Co.

Restaurant information
- Established: 1989 (37 years ago)
- Owner: Dana Street
- Location: 33 Wharf Street, Portland, Cumberland County, Maine, 04101, United States
- Coordinates: 43°39′21″N 70°15′15″W
- Website: www.streetandcompany.net

Street & Co. is a restaurant at 33 Wharf Street in the Old Port neighborhood of Portland, Maine, United States. It was established in 1989 by Dana Street, who also owns three other businesses in the city: Fore Street, Standard Baking Co. (located in the same building as Fore Street) and Scales.
