= Middle of the Night (novel) =

2024 thriller novel by Riley Sager

- Book cover
- Author: Riley Sager
- Audio read by: Santino Fontana
- Language: English
- Genre: Psychological thriller
- Set in: Princeton, New Jersey
- Publisher: Dutton
- Publication date: 2024
- Publication place: United States
- Pages: 384
- ISBN: 9780593472378
- Preceded by: The Only One Left
- Followed by: With a Vengeance

Middle of the Night is a 2024 psychological thriller novel by Riley Sager. The book follows Ethan Marsh, who returns to his childhood home and is haunted by the disappearance of his best friend Billy decades ago during a backyard sleepover.

== Plot ==
In July 1994, 10-year-old Ethan Marsh lives in the Hemlock Circle cul-de-sac in Princeton, New Jersey. One day, Ethan and his best friend Billy Barringer explore the grounds of the nearby Hawthorne Institute, a parapsychological research facility founded by the eccentric Ezra Hawthorne. They are joined by another friend Russ as well as Ragesh and Ethan's babysitter Ashley, two neighborhood teenagers.

Ragesh locks Billy, Ethan, and Russ inside the institute's mausoleum as a prank. Ethan and Russ escape but abandon Billy, who is caught by institute staff. Billy is taken to see Ezra Hawthorne, and the two converse about ghosts, one of Billy's interests.

That night, Ethan and Billy are camping in Ethan's backyard; the boys fight about Billy's belief in ghosts. When Ethan wakes up, he discovers that the tent has been sliced open and Billy is missing. There are no solid clues or suspects, and Billy's case receives widespread media attention as the "Lost Boy". Ethan continues to be haunted by a recurring dream of hearing the tent being sliced open.

In July 2024, Ethan returns to Hemlock Circle to tend the house after his parents move to Florida. While the Barringers and their other son Andy left long ago, Russ still lives in the neighborhood, and Ashley has returned with her 10-year-old son Henry to care for her ailing father.

Ragesh, now a local police detective, tells Ethan, Russ, and Ashley that Billy's remains have just been discovered. The body was at the bottom of a waterfall on the Hawthorne Institute's grounds. Evidence suggests that Billy suffered blunt trauma and his body was dumped at the falls.

Ethan probes the institute for its potential involvement in Billy's death. He learns that Ragesh and Johnny—Russ' older brother who died of a drug overdose the year before Billy's disappearance—were volunteers at the institute, and suspects that Billy and Johnny's deaths are linked. He also learns that his mother worked at the institute as a secretary, but was fired the day before Billy's disappearance after she accidentally witnessed an occult ritual.

Meanwhile, Ethan experiences a series of unusual events: motion detector lights turn on at night, handwritten notes appear in his house, and baseballs are placed in his yard (a signal Billy used when he wanted to play). It is revealed that Ethan's wife Claudia, to whom he has been sending voicemails and text messages, died a year ago of an aortic aneurysm. Ethan wants to believe in a paranormal explanation for these events to help process his grief about Claudia.

Ethan attempts to recreate the night of Billy's disappearance by camping in his backyard. He discovers in his dream that the person slicing the tent was Russ, who resented Ethan and Billy's friendship. Ethan confronts Russ, who is arrested.

Henry is abducted by Billy's brother Andy, who has been off the grid for years and returned to the neighborhood after learning Billy's body was found. Ethan realizes that Ashley's senile father, who mentioned seeing the "Barringer boy" in the neighborhood recently, was actually talking about Andy. He also realizes that Andy is responsible for the "paranormal" events—tripping the motion detectors, writing the notes, and placing baseballs in Ethan's yard.

Ethan and Ashley confront Andy at the institute's waterfall. Andy, who has come to believe that Ethan killed Billy, threatens to drop Henry over the falls. Ashley confesses that her car struck Billy late at night while she was driving through the woods under the influence. Billy had left the tent on his own through the gash left by Russ, and was trying to return to the institute after his fight with Ethan. Ashley then hid Billy's body at the falls, telling her parents that she hit a deer. Henry falls into the water and is rescued by Ethan, who feels a supernatural presence helping them.

One year later, Russ has departed Hemlock Circle. Ashley is sentenced to prison for vehicular manslaughter and disposing of Billy's body, with the possibility of parole after eight years. She encourages Ethan to legally adopt Henry, and the pair move in together.

== Background ==
After seven novels with a female main character, Middle of the Night is Sager's first novel with a male protagonist. Also unusual for Sager, the story is told from multiple points of view. Like the book's protagonist Ethan, Sager lived on a cul-de-sac in Princeton, New Jersey at the time of writing; he was inspired by "the idea of writing about a place that everyone thinks is so safe and so quiet and nothing bad ever happens".

The book's cover features artwork by the Spanish-American artist Alberto Ortega.

== Reception ==
Middle of the Night spent three weeks on the New York Times Best Seller list in the "Hardcover Fiction" category. Gabino Iglesias, in the Times, wrote that Middle of the Night was "a creepy and unnerving thriller that flirts with the supernatural", calling Sager "a master of twists". USA Today's Felecia Wellington Radel gave the book three out of four stars; she called it a "twisty mystery" with "many sudden turns" and "suburban secrets", but was disappointed that the book's deeper questions "largely go unanswered".

In a starred review, Publishers Weekly called Middle of the Night a "standout work of psychological suspense" which "confirms that Sager has few equals when it comes to merging creepiness and compassion." Library Journal's Elisha Sheffer said that the story's paranormal element "adds a pleasant chill as the tension gradually builds", and that Sager's "signature style will leave readers dizzyingly satisfied." Kirkus Reviews gave Middle of the Night a negative review due to the book's red herrings and "a complicated resolution that raises more questions than it answers", calling it "intensely boring" with a "punishingly slow" pace.
