= The House Across the Lake (novel) =

2022 novel by Riley Sager

- First edition (US)
- Author: Riley Sager
- Audio read by: Bernadette Dunne
- Language: English
- Genre: Thriller
- Publisher: Dutton (US); Hodder & Stoughton (UK)
- Publication date: July 7, 2022
- Publication place: United States
- Media type: Print, ebook, audiobook
- Pages: 368 pages
- ISBN: 0593183193 First edition hardback
- Preceded by: Survive the Night
- Followed by: The Only One Left

The House Across the Lake is a thriller novel published on July 7, 2022 by American author Todd Ritter, writing under the pen name Riley Sager. The plot concerns a woman who investigates the disappearance and possible murder of her glamorous neighbor at a Vermont lake resort. Reviewers favorably compared the book to the classic film Rear Window and a movie adaptation is planned.

== Plot summary ==
Alcoholic actress Casey Fletcher has retreated to her family's cabin at Lake Greene, Vermont in order to hide from the press. She is haunted by the death of her screenwriter husband Len, who drowned in Lake Greene the previous year. While watching the lake one afternoon, she rescues her neighbor, former runway model Katherine Royce, from drowning.

Over the next several days, Casey befriends Katherine and her husband, app developer Tom. She develops a habit of watching the Royces in their large house across the lake from her own. While sharing an expensive bottle of wine, Katherine reveals to Casey that Tom's startup is struggling for lack of capital and that her own money is keeping the two of them afloat. She complains of headaches and dissociative episodes before collapsing from the heavy drinking.

The next morning, Katherine disappears. Social media posts suggest she has returned to Manhattan, but Casey discovers these have been fabricated, leading her to think that Tom may have killed his wife. She confesses her suspicions to local handyman Boone Conrad, to whom she develops an unspoken attraction. Boone, a former police officer, contacts a former coworker, Wilma Anson. Wilma dismisses their suspicions until Casey recovers a broken piece of the wineglass Katherine drank from the night before she disappeared. Wilma reveals that the Royces may be connected to an active investigation: three young girls who disappeared from the surrounding area and are now presumed dead, victims of a serial killer.

Despite Wilma's warnings, Casey continues spying on the Royce home then to find more evidence, as well as Katherine's phone hidden into a dresser drawer with many missed calls. She and Boone begin to investigate the case of the missing girls. Casey's suspicions turn to Boone himself when she discovers that Boone was at one point a suspect in his wife's death, as well as finds out the missing calls on Katherine's phone end up being Boone calling her. Feeling she can no longer trust anyone else, Casey takes matters into her own hands. She breaks into the Royce home and finds Katherine tied up in the basement, but still alive. Tom confronts both of them and "Katherine" explains that she is in fact Casey's dead husband Len.

It is revealed that Len was the serial killer behind the three dead girls. When Casey found out, she drugged him and drowned him in Lake Greene. Since then, Len's ghost has been haunting the lake, waiting for a new body to possess. He took over Katherine's body when she fell in the lake and was rescued by Casey.

Casey takes Katherine/Len to her home and forces him to reveal where he hid the bodies of the three girls. She sends the information to the authorities, then tricks Len into moving from Katherine's body into hers and drowns herself in the lake, only to be rescued by the now-conscious Katherine. Casey realizes that Tom really was trying to murder his wife.

Back home, Casey is confronted by Tom, who attacks her for uncovering his plot to murder his wife. She kills him in self-defense, with him being possessed by Len, who she stabs to death. Casey and Katherine bond over their shared experience and Casey decides to stay at Lake Greene in case Len's spirit returns.

== Release ==
The House Across the Lake was first published in the United States on June 21, 2022 through Dutton in hardback and ebook formats. An audiobook adaptation narrated by Bernadette Dunne was released simultaneously through Penguin Audio.

The book placed on the Publishers Weekly bestseller list for the week of July 10, 2022.

== Film adaptation ==
In March 2023, it was reported that Netflix will adapt the novel into a feature film with Paul Feig set to direct for Berlanti-Schechter Films and Feigco Entertainment.

== Reception ==
Reviews for the book commented on the novel's twists, with some reviewers praising them while others did not. USA Today and BookPage were both favorable in their reviews, with both comparing the storyline to Alfred Hitchcock's Rear Window. The St. Louis Post Dispatch and Daily Herald were both more critical, as the Daily Herald felt that "As with Sager's first five thrillers, the characters are well-drawn and the prose is first-rate. However, the book takes readers on such a wild ride that some may find it too improbable to swallow."
