= Mysterious Art =

German band

- Origin: Frankfurt, Germany
- Genres: Synthpop, electronic
- Years active: 1987–1992, 2012-2019
- Labels: NOSTRUM Records; CBS Records; Cream Studios
- Past members: Mike Staab; Michael Krautter; Tillmann Uhrmacher; Nicole Kolb; Stephanie Trautmann

Mysterious Art is a German electronic dance music group founded in 1987. The group became famous for its hit single "Das Omen”.

== History ==
Mysterious Art was founded in 1987 by Michael Krautter (keyboards and mouse). By December 1988, copies of this instrumental were played throughout the whole German club scene, and sparked the interest of DJ Mike Staab and the record label CBS. Vocals for the debut single "Das Omen" were added and recorded at Cream Studios in Frankfurt in January 1989. The single saw its first release on May 13, 1989. The song quickly reached the #1 position of the official German Media Control singles charts, where it remained for nine weeks straight. The song sold over 490,000 singles in Germany alone and has since remained the most successful published work under CBS Publishing GmbH.

The song prominently sampled part of Carl Orff's Carmina Burana and Goethe's Faust. The lyrics refer to the pact with the devil, the main motif of Faust.

Mysterious Art also toured as the opening act for Madonna's Blond Ambition Tour in Germany.

Their second single, "Carma - Omen 2" reached #9 on the German charts and remained there for three weeks. It was followed up by the album Omen – The Story in the fall of 1989. In 1991, the band published their second album, Mystic Mountains.

In 2011 Nicole Boeúf (now Kolb) and Michael Krautter reformed Mysterious Art and played some shows on and off from 2012 until 2019.

== Members ==
- Michael Krautter - keyboards, programming
- Nicole Boeúf - vocals
- Stephanie Trautmann - backing vocals
- Tillmann Uhrmacher - bass, keyboards, programming
- Mike Staab - drums, keyboards, programming, producer

== Life after the band ==
In 1994, Mike Staab produced Magic Affair as a Eurodance follow-up group. Their first song, titled "Omen 3", was first under the moniker M.A., and again hit the top position of the German charts under the record label EMI. Mike Staab died on May 11, 2009, from a heart attack.

Michael Krautter moved to Canada and continues to work as a composer and producer for music and film. Under the Mysterious Art moniker he provided music for the film Eternal, published in the US and Canada by Columbia Pictures in 2004

Tillmann Uhrmacher became a famous DJ (RPR Maximal) and released a great number of remixes and original tracks. He used to hold the record for the longest non-stop radio hosting (80 hours in 1994). He died in 2011.

Nicole Kolb (née Boeúf) released an unsuccessful single under the name of Viva and is singing in a band called Chicahlgo.

Stephanie Trautmann left the band before the first album was released and returned to classical music. She lives in the Taunus, working as a secretary.

== Discography ==
=== Albums ===
- 1989: Omen - The Story
- 1991: Mystic Mountains
- 2008: 20th Century Complete Works (Box-Set including their two albums with bonus tracks - even though this album was called "Complete Works", this release was not authorized and does not contain the whole works of Mysterious Art)

=== Singles ===
- 1989: "Das Omen (Teil 1)" (D #1, A #2, CH #2)
- 1989: "Das Omen (Teil 1)" (Remix)
- 1989: "Carma (Omen 2)" (D #9, A #17, CH #10)
- 1989: "Carma (Omen 2)" (Remix)
- 1990: "Requiem"
- 1990: "Requiem" (Remix)
- 1991: "High On Mystic Mountain"
- 1991: "Lovin' You"
- 1991: "Lovin' You" (Remix) (cover)
- 1994: "Omen III M.A." (The original authorized title)
