= Home Before Dark (novel) =

Novel by Riley Sager

- First edition
- Author: Riley Sager
- Audio read by: Cady McClain; Jon Lindstrom
- Language: English
- Genre: Thriller
- Publisher: Dutton
- Publication date: 2020
- Publication place: United States
- Pages: 384 pages
- ISBN: 1524745170
- Preceded by: Lock Every Door
- Followed by: Survive the Night

Home Before Dark is a 2020 psychological horror novel by pseudonymous author Riley Sager. The novel was first published on June 30, 2020, through Dutton. Sager references the 1977 Jay Anson book The Amityville Horror during the novel, which also served as part of Home Before Dark's inspiration.

The novel is told via a split narrative in alternating chapters. It focuses on the characters of Maggie Holt, via her first person narrative, and her father Ewan, through excerpts taken from a book. The book-within-a-book focuses on supernatural events that Ewan claims drove them to flee their home and never return. Reviewers were impressed by the use of parallel structure.

== Synopsis ==
The novel is told via a split narrative. Maggie Holt narrates events as they happen during current day, while her father Ewan's narrative occurs via passages of his book House of Horrors, which details the family's time at Baneberry Hall during the 1990s.

=== House of Horrors ===
Ewan Holt and his wife Jess have purchased Baneberry Hall, a Victorian home in need of some repair. In the 2020 hardcover edition of Home Before Dark, the haunted house, named Baneberry Hall for all of the baneberries that grew in the area, was built in 1875 by the richest man in town, lumber man, William Garson, as referenced on page 19 as part of the House of Horrors book-within-a-book, who later lost his fortune in The Great Depression. The realtor reluctantly informs them that the home was the site of a murder suicide; prior owner Curtis Carver murdered his daughter Katie before taking his own life, leaving his wife Marta to discover their bodies.

The Holts experience several strange events that appear to reference both the Carver murder-suicide as well as the house's original owner, William Garson, and his daughter Indigo. Five-year-old daughter Maggie has expressed fear of a being she calls "Mister Shadow" and has an imaginary playmate called "Miss Pennyface", so named because she has pennies on her eyes. Ewan begins to investigate the house's history, assisted by Petra Ditmer, teenage daughter of housekeeper Elsa Ditmer.

After the kitchen ceiling collapses, Ewan discovers letters that detail a love affair between Indigo Garson and a painter. The letters contradict local legend that Indigo had committed suicide. It is revealed that Indigo was murdered and that her spirit has been taking revenge by killing young girls in a way that pushes the blame onto their fathers. The Holt family flee the house, never to return.

=== Maggie Holt ===
Approximately twenty-five years later, Maggie revisits Baneberry Hall with the intention to sell it and hires Dane, the son of the prior caretaker, as her assistant. Dane informs Maggie that, though most of the people mentioned in House of Horrors still live in the area, including the Ditmers and Marta Carver, they resent the notoriety they have gained from the book. It is revealed that Petra Ditmer disappeared on the same night the Holts fled the house.

Maggie experiences several strange occurrences within the home that mirror events in the book. When Petra's bones are discovered in the kitchen ceiling, Police Chief Tess Alcott informs Maggie that locals believe Ewan to have murdered her. Feeling duty-bound to clear her father's name, Maggie investigates the truth behind the story, only to discover that, contrary to what she believed, most events in the book unfolded as written.

Maggie discovers a backdoor into the house, leading to her childhood bedroom, and that her father had hired Dane to work on the house prior to Petra's death. Believing Dane to be the killer, the two fight. In the process, Dane is injured and taken to the hospital. Maggie's mother arrives and reveals that Maggie killed Petra, who had been babysitting her, by pushing her down the stairs. In order to protect Maggie, Ewan wrote House of Horrors.

After Maggie's mother leaves, Marta Carver enters through the secret passage. Marta tells Maggie she used to sneak into the house to watch Maggie sleep, due to her reminding Marta of Katie. One night, Petra confronted Marta and Marta accidentally killed her during a scuffle. In order to keep the past hidden, Marta has decided to murder Maggie and pushes her down the stairs. Maggie sees Elsa, possibly assisted by Petra's ghost, creep up behind Marta and push her down the stairs as well, killing her. She realizes that "Miss Pennyface" and "Mister Shadow" were in fact Marta and Elsa.

In the aftermath, Maggie writes a book about the true events of the house.

== Development ==
Sager began planning the novel after listening to a podcast about The Amityville Horror, as the hosts stated that "most people agree it was a hoax, but no one knows why the Lutz family did it". He felt that this "could be an interesting story to explore" and chose to use the book-within-a-book structure in order to alternate between the fictional novel House of Horrors and Maggie's own first person narrative. Sager has noted that this made the writing more challenging, as "changing something in one meant having to make changes in the other, which would then cause changes in the other."

== Release ==
Home Before Dark was released in hardback in the United States on June 30, 2020, through Dutton. An audiobook adaptation narrated by Cady McClain and Jon Lindstrom was released by Penguin Audio alongside the hardback. Paperback and Kindle editions were released in the United Kingdom through Hodder & Stoughton in 2021.

== Reception ==
Home Before Dark was on the New York Times Bestseller List for July 19, 2020.

The novel was reviewed by USA Today and BookPage, both of which commented favorably on the use of a book-within-a-book structure. Judith Reveal of the New York Journal of Books also noted the structure in her review, stating that "Although the multiple first-person points of view (written in different print fonts) can at times be distracting, Sager has laid out an exciting story that is hard to put down."

Tina Jordan of the New York Times criticized some of the book's dialogue and supporting characters while also praising the multiple points of view.

== Adaptation ==
In February 2020 Deadline announced that Sony Pictures won film adaptation rights to Home Before Dark. Shawn Levy’s 21 Laps Entertainment is to produce the film. In a July 2020 interview with The Big Thrill, Sager stated that the production process had been impacted by the COVID-19 pandemic.
