= Tillmann Uhrmacher =

Tillmann Rudolf Uhrmacher
- Born: 14 May 1967
- Died: 30 May 2011 (aged 44)
- Genres: Electronica, trance
- Occupations: Producer, DJ
- Instruments: Turntable, Mixer
- Years active: 1989–2011
- Labels: MaxiMal, Direction Recordings

Tillmann Uhrmacher (German pronunciation: [ˈtɪlman ˈʔuːɐ̯maxɐ]; 14 May 1967 – 30 May 2011) was a German electronic DJ, producer, and radio host.

== Career ==
Tillmann Uhrmacher started his career as a DJ in a well-known little club, worked in a record shop and went on to become an internationally renowned DJ.

Musical recognition was first achieved when Uhrmacher was one of the founding members of the electronic group Mysterious Art, along with members Michael Krautter, Mike Staab, Nicole Boeúf and Stephanie Trautmann. In 1988, the band's first single "Das Omen" became a number one hit in Germany, selling over 400,000 copies. It spent 29 weeks in the German charts and was the second most successful single of the year. This was followed by a second single "Karma – Omen 2", which also reached the top 10. In 1990, the band supported Madonna's Blond Ambition World Tour.

In June 1990, Uhrmacher began his own radio-show broadcast every Saturday evening on RPR1. Later, this show was broadcast on sunshine live. This ran from its inception in 1990 until 18 March 2011 and is the longest-running electronic music show on German radio. In 1994, he entered into the Guinness Book of Records for an 80-hour non-stop broadcast. In addition, Tillmann Uhrmacher also produced a compilation series called Maximal in the mix. The last issue appeared in April 2009, after the tenth edition.

Uhrmacher published his first solo single "Bassfly" in 1999. In 2001, the single "On the Run" did well on the UK club charts and attained number 16 in the UK singles charts. A collaboration with Mauro Picotto under the pseudonym of Lava brought about two singles Autumn and Spring Time. Between 2000 and 2002, he presented the Tillmann Uhrmacher Show on Hitradio RPR1. He was chosen to be a judge for the German Dance Awards in Hamburg, and also became the stadium speaker of the 1. FC Kaiserslautern Bundesliga football outfit.

Tillmann Uhrmacher also appeared at both small and large festivals in the field of electronic music. Since 1999, he had appeared at least once every year on one of the main stages at Nature One and additional performances on smaller stages. In addition, he hosted the live coverage of the Nature One on Sunshine Live. An appearance had been planned for Nature One 2011.

== Final activity ==
=== 2010 ===
In 2010 Uhrmacher was still presenting his Saturday evening show on RPR1. In May, he took part in the ZDF Fernsehgarten show. With other VIPs, he held a flea-market stand, telling nostalgic stories and presenting abstract objects. The show was also broadcast on radio RPR1.

=== 2011 ===
Tillmann presented his last radio show in March, but had to put it on hiatus due to ill health.

== Death ==
On 8 June 2011, it was announced by Uhrmacher's family that he had been found dead in his apartment of as yet unknown causes. His obituary lists 30 May 2011 as his date of death.

== Discography ==
=== Singles ===
==== With The Mysterious Art ====
- 1989: "Das Omen (Teil 1)"
- 1989: "Karma – Omen II"
- 1990: "Requiem"
- 1991: "High on Mystic Mountain"
- 1991: "Lovin' You / Awaken"

==== With Mauro Picotto (as Lava) ====
- 2000: "Autumn"
- 2001: "Spring Time (Let Yourself Go)"

==== Solo ====
- 1999: "Bassfly"
- 2000: "Free"
- 2001: "On the Run"
- 2001: "Friends"
- 2006: "The Pride in Your Eyes (Om Nama Shiva)"

=== Remixes (select) ===
- Culture Beat – "Got to Get It" (1993)
- Culture Beat – "Anything" (1994)
- Masterboy – "Is This the Love" (1994)
- Culture Beat – "Crying in the Rain" (1996)
- Marky Mark – "Hey DJ" (1997)
- Taucher – "Pictures of a Gallery" (2001)
- Rochus – "High Noon" (2001)
- CRW feat. Veronika – "Like a Cat" (2002)
- Ian Van Dahl – "Try" (2002)
- Mauro Picotto – "Pulsar" (2002)
- Tomcraft – "Loneliness" (2003)
- DJ Tatana – "Elements of Culture" (2004)
- Nature One Inc. – "Live Your Passion" (2006)
- Nature One Inc. – "Das dreizehnte Land" (2007)
- Members of Mayday – "New Euphoria" (2007)
- Milo.nl & CJ Stone feat. Lizzy Pattinson – "Surrender" (2008)
