= Margaret Costa (food writer) =

British food writer and restaurateur

Margaret Mary Costa (30 August 1917 – 1 August 1999) was a British food writer and restaurateur, and an early contributor to the Good Food Guide. Her 1970s Four Seasons Cookery Book influenced subsequent food writers and remains in print.

== Early life ==
Costa was born Margaret Mary Murphy on 30 August 1917 in Umtali, where her father worked for the then Southern Rhodesian government. The family moved to England in 1932. Margaret won an exhibition scholarship to Lady Margaret Hall, Oxford, to read English but switched to French.

She moved to London during World War II to be a senior civil servant in the Ministry of Fuel and Power after a period working for Chatham House whilst it was in Oxford. She was an Air Raid Warden for the Seven Dials area of London. She then worked for theatre manager Jack Pemberton.

== Career ==
By 1945, Costa was a freelance writer for magazines such as the Sunday Pictorial and the Farmer and Stockbreeder. She also worked as a translator for English businessmen visiting France. She became friends with Raymond Postgate and assisted him in compiling early editions of the Good Food Guide.

In 1948, Margaret Murphy married her first husband, John (Bill) Costa. She then wrote as Margaret Costa, retaining the name after they divorced in 1958.

In 1958, Costa translated Plats Nouveaux by Paul Reboux into English as Food for the Rich. Her columns for the Farmer's Home magazine were collected and published as A Country Cook in 1960.

In 1965, Costa took over the regular cookery column in The Sunday Times colour magazine from Robert Carrier. She also wrote about food and travel for the American magazine Gourmet, where she promoted Albert and Michel Roux early in their careers.

She met the chef William James (Bill) Lacy, and in 1970 they opened the Lacy's restaurant on Charing Cross Road. It ran for a decade, closing in 1980. Costa and Lacy were married in November 1979.

Her 1970s book, Four Seasons Cookery Book, had chapters based around ingredients rather than courses. It was republished in 1996, and she was given a special award and standing ovation at the Glenfiddich Awards.

== Later life ==
After Lacy's restaurant closed, the couple lost their money. At one point, they were living in their car. Costa was diagnosed with Alzheimer's disease in 1984. She moved to a care home in Sussex after Lacy's death in 1994.

Costa died on 1 August 1999 in St Leonards, East Sussex.

== Influence ==
Nigel Slater and Ruby Tandoh have suggested that Costa set the tone for modern food writing.

== Selected works ==
- A Country Cook (1960)
- Four Seasons Cookery Book (1970)
