= Riley Sager =

American author

Todd Ritter
- Occupation: Writer
- Writing career
- Pen name: Riley Sager; Alan Finn
- Language: English
- Notable works: Final Girls; Lock Every Door; Home Before Dark
- Website: www.rileysagerbooks.com

Todd Ritter, also known under the noms de plume of Riley Sager and Alan Finn, is an American author of thriller novels.

== Early life, family and education ==
Ritter grew up in a ranch-style house in Pennsylvania.

== Early career ==
Before becoming a full-time novelist Ritter worked as a journalist, editor and graphic designer.

== Writing career ==
As of 2022 Ritter has released six novels as Sager and three novels under his real name, the latter of which make up the Kat Campbell series. Ritter has also released one novel under the pen name Alan Finn, Things Half in Shadow. He referenced the choice to write under the name Sager, stating that "since we were looking for a new publisher, one could argue that editors would be willing to go with someone who had a clean slate, rather than a critically acclaimed author with a spotty sales record." The author's website for "Riley Sager" initially lacked an author photo or any gender identifying language, including pronouns. This has since changed, as the current website features a photo of Ritter and uses he/him pronouns.

== Bibliography ==
=== As Riley Sager ===
- Final Girls (2017)
- The Last Time I Lied (2018)
- Lock Every Door (2019)
- Home Before Dark (2020)
- Survive the Night (2021)
- The House Across the Lake (2022)
- The Only One Left (2023)
- Middle of the Night (2024)
- With a Vengeance (2025)
- The Unknown (2026)

=== As Todd Ritter ===
==== Kat Campbell series ====
1. Death Notice (2010)
2. Bad Moon (2011, also released as Death Falls)
3. Devil's Night (2013, also released as Death Night)

=== As Alan Finn ===
- Things Half in Shadow (2014)

== Awards ==
Work	Year & Award	Category	Result	Ref.
Final Girls	2017 Goodreads Choice Awards	Horror	Nominated	
Final Girls	2018 International Thriller Writers Awards	Hard Cover Novel	Won	
The Last Time I Lied	2018 Goodreads Choice Awards	Mystery & Thriller	Nominated	
Lock Every Door	2019 Goodreads Choice Awards	Mystery & Thriller	Nominated	
Lock Every Door	2020 RUSA CODES Reading List		Shortlisted	
Home Before Dark	2020 Goodreads Choice Awards	Mystery & Thriller	Nominated	
The Only One Left	2023 Dragon Awards	Horror	Nominated	
The Only One Left	2023 Goodreads Choice Awards	Mystery & Thriller	Nominated	
Middle of the Night	2024 Goodreads Choice Awards	Mystery & Thriller	Nominated	
