= Survive the Night (novel) =

2021 novel by Todd Ritter

- First edition (US)
- Author: Riley Sager
- Audio read by: Savannah Gilmore
- Language: English
- Genre: Thriller
- Publisher: E. P. Dutton (US); Hodder & Stoughton (UK)
- Publication date: June 29, 2021
- Publication place: United States
- Media type: Print, ebook, audiobook
- Pages: 336 pages
- ISBN: 0593183169 First edition hardback
- Preceded by: Home Before Dark
- Followed by: The House Across the Lake

Survive the Night is a 2021 thriller novel by American author Todd Ritter, under the penname Riley Sager. It was first published in the United States on June 29, 2021 through Dutton and centers upon a woman who realizes that she may be sharing a car ride with a murderer.

== Synopsis ==
The book follows Charlie, a young woman who drops out of film college due to the trauma of her best friend Maddy being murdered by a serial killer. Dubbed "The Campus Killer", the murderer had been picking off women on their campus. At the time Charlie had assumed that the murder was one of her visual hallucinations, something she is prone to experiencing, especially in emotional situations. These hallucinations typically appear as film scenes. As she did not stop the murder and cannot provide many helpful details, Charlie is extremely guilt stricken. She arranges for a ride home via a ride share, as she doesn't drive due to her parents dying in a car crash, and through this meets Josh.

Their ride is initially pleasant and the two hit it off, however Charlie becomes convinced that he is the murderer when he mentions that the murderer took one of Maddy's teeth, something that the police did not reveal to the general public. Josh also admits that he came to campus specifically to find Charlie. The two stop at a diner, where Charlie meets a waitress named Marge. She is briefly offered a chance to escape with Marge's help and even manages to call her boyfriend Robbie, but Charlie decides to keep traveling with Josh in order to get revenge and stop him from killing anyone else. This surprises Josh, who assumed that she would have chosen to escape. The two talk some more and Charlie admits that she tried killing herself. She then stabs Josh and flees back to the diner, where she is captured by Marge and taken to an abandoned resort lodge.

Marge reveals that she is Maddy's grandmother and that Josh is a bounty hunter. She hired him in order to bring Charlie to her and force her to give her details of the murder. Unable to give her any of the information she desires as she has begun to hallucinate, Charlie is almost attacked by Marge but saved by the last minute by Josh. Marge shoots Josh and accidentally sets the building on fire by dropping a lantern. Charlie's boyfriend Robbie appears, responding to her earlier call, and saves Charlie from both Marge's fury and the burning building but is injured in the process. This makes it necessary for Charlie to drive.

While she is prepping herself to drive she discovers a ring box containing several teeth, revealing that Robbie is the true murderer. Horrified, Charlie manages to handcuff Robbie to the car and drive it into the river, drowning him. Charlie escapes, but manages to take one of Robbie's teeth in the process. She tells the police about her discovery but leaves out any information about Marge's involvement. She's taken to the hospital where she reunites with Marge, giving her Robbie's tooth to show that Maddy has been avenged. Outside the hospital she also reunites with Josh and the two begin dating.

The book's epilogue reveals that the events of the novel were a film adaptation of the truth. Robbie was the murderer and Charlie did start a relationship with Josh, who left the bounty hunter profession in order to become a chauffeur. She muses that the real life events were more tragic and less picturesque, as Marge had shot herself after Charlie left the lodge, but that she prefers real life to films.

== Development ==
Per Sager, he had planned for Charlie to be a former film student from the start as "that’s what I was in the ’90s" and wanted to include several film and music references from the era. The character's visual hallucinations and past trauma involving cars were included in the book in order to resolve the issue of why Charlie would remain in the car with a suspected murderer, as she would see herself as an unreliable narrator for what is happening around her.

== Release ==
Survive the Night was first published in hardback and ebook formats in the United States on June 29, 2021 through Dutton. An audiobook adaptation read by Savannah Gilmore was released simultaneously through Penguin Audio. A paperback edition will be released on August 30, 2022, also through Dutton.

== Reception ==
USA Today gave Survive the Night a favorable review, as did Bruce DeSilva, who praised it as a "first-rate read". A reviewer for the Sun Sentinel was also positive, noting that "Sager constantly keeps the reader off-kilter with clever twists and turns that are as terrifying as they are believable, while blurring the line between Charlie’s experiences and her fantasies."
