= Ruth Reichl =

American chef, writer, and editor (born 1948)

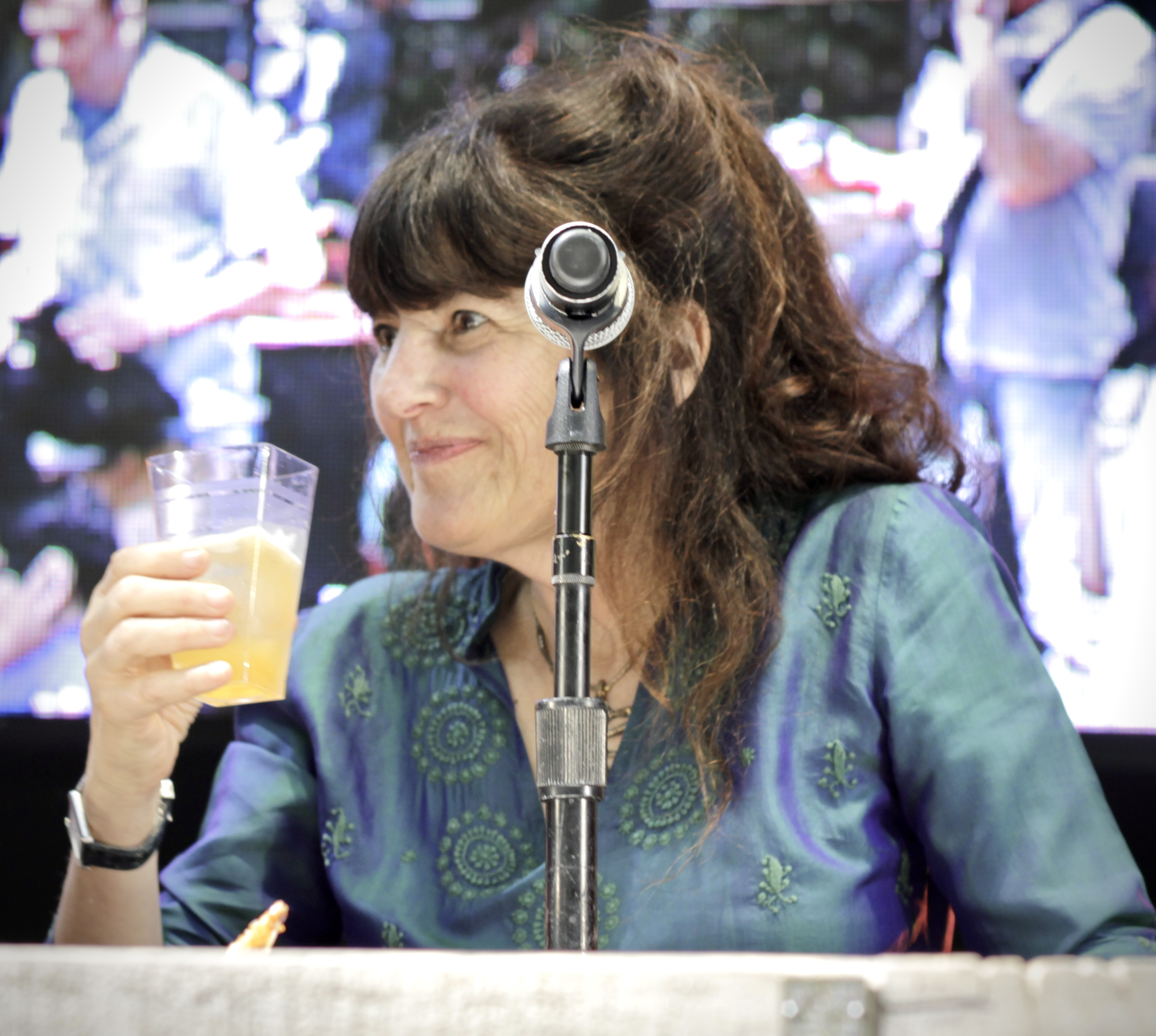
- Reichl in 2012
- Born: 1948 (age 77–78); New York City, New York, U.S.
- Occupations: Food writer, magazine editor, chef
- Writing career
- Genre: Cooking

Ruth Reichl (/ˈraɪʃəl/ RY-shəl; born 1948) is an American chef, food writer and editor. In addition to two decades as a food critic, mainly spent at the Los Angeles Times and The New York Times, Reichl has also written cookbooks, memoirs and a novel, and has been co-producer of PBS's Gourmet's Diary of a Foodie, culinary editor for the Modern Library, host of PBS's Gourmet's Adventures With Ruth, and editor-in-chief of Gourmet magazine. She has won six James Beard Foundation Awards.

Reichl's memoirs are Tender at the Bone: Growing Up at the Table (1998), Comfort Me with Apples: More Adventures at the Table, Garlic and Sapphires: The Secret Life of a Critic in Disguise, Not Becoming My Mother, and Save Me the Plums: My Gourmet Memoir (2019). In 2009, she published Gourmet Today, a 1,008 page cookbook containing over 1,000 recipes. She published her first novel, Delicious! in 2014, and, in 2015, published My Kitchen Year: 136 Recipes That Saved My Life, a memoir of recipes prepared in the year following the shuttering of Gourmet.

== Early life and education ==
Born in 1948 to Ernst, a typographer, and Miriam (née Brudno), her German-Jewish refugee father and American-Jewish mother, Reichl was raised in Greenwich Village and spent time at a boarding school in Montreal as a young girl. She attended the University of Michigan, where she earned a degree in sociology in 1968 and met her first husband, the artist Douglas Hollis. In 1970 she earned an M.A. in art history, also from the University of Michigan.

== Career ==
Reichl and Hollis moved to Berkeley, California, where her interest in food led to her joining the collectively owned Swallow Restaurant as a chef and co-owner from 1973 to 1977. Reichl began her food-writing career with Mmmmm: A Feastiary, a cookbook, in 1972. She moved on to become food writer and editor of New West magazine in 1978, then to the Los Angeles Times as its restaurant editor from 1984 to 1993 and food editor and critic from 1990 to 1993. She returned to her native New York City in 1993 to become the restaurant critic for The New York Times. As a critic, she was known for her ability to "make or break" a restaurant with her attention to detail. For Reichl, her mission was to "demystify the world of fine cuisine". Despite her success and tales of how she used to disguise herself to mask her identity while reviewing, eventually she said: "I really wanted to go home and cook for my family. I don't think there's one thing more important you can do for your kids than have family dinner." In 1999, Reichl left the Times to assume the editorship of Gourmet, which she managed until it closed in 2009. During her tenure, the magazine sold 988,000 copies per month (as of March 2007) and commissioned works like David Foster Wallace's "Consider the Lobster".

Reichl's memoirs are Tender at the Bone: Growing Up at the Table (1998), Comfort Me with Apples: More Adventures at the Table (2001), Garlic and Sapphires: The Secret Life of a Critic in Disguise (2005), Not Becoming My Mother (2009), and Save Me the Plums: My Gourmet Memoir (2019). In 2009, she published Gourmet Today, a 1,008 page cookbook containing over 1,000 recipes. She published her first novel, Delicious! in 2014, and, in 2015, published My Kitchen Year: 136 Recipes That Saved My Life, a memoir of recipes prepared in the year following the shuttering of Gourmet.

From 2011 to 2013, Reichl appeared as a judge on seasons 3, 4 and 5 of the Bravo reality television show Top Chef Masters.

In 2021, Reichl joined Substack to begin publishing a newsletter about food writing.

== Honors ==
Reichl has been the recipient of six James Beard Awards, and in 2024 the foundation gave her a Lifetime Achievement Award.

== Personal life ==
Reichl has been married twice. Her first husband was the artist Douglas Hollis. She was married to her second husband, the television producer Michael Singer, for forty years until his death on May 13, 2026. Together Reichl and Singer had one son. They lived in Spencertown, New York.

== Movie credits ==
She is featured in the 2021 documentary on Wolfgang Puck, Wolfgang, as one of the prominent food world figures influenced by Puck.

== Books ==
- Mmmmm: A Feastiary (cookbook), (1972)
- Tender at the Bone: Growing Up at the Table (memoir) (1998)
- Comfort Me with Apples: More Adventures at the Table (memoir) (2001)
- Garlic and Sapphires: The Secret Life of a Critic in Disguise (memoir) (2005)
- The Gourmet Cookbook: More Than 1000 Recipes (2006)
- Not Becoming My Mother: and Other Things She Taught Me Along the Way (2009)
- Gourmet Today: More than 1000 All-New Recipes for the Contemporary Kitchen (2009)
- For You, Mom. Finally. (2010; first published under the title Not Becoming My Mother)
- Delicious! (novel) (2014)
- My Kitchen Year: 136 Recipes That Saved My Life (2015)
- Save Me the Plums: My Gourmet Memoir (2019)
- The Paris Novel (2024)
