= Gourmet (magazine) =

American food magazine

- Editor in chief: Ruth Reichl (1999–2009)
- Former editors: Gail Zweigenthal (1991–1998); Jane Montant (1980–1991); Earle R. MacAusland (1941–1980)
- Frequency: Monthly
- Publisher: Earle R. MacAusland (1941–1980); Condé Nast (1983–2009); Independent, worker-owned (2026-present)
- First issue: January 1941
- Final issue: November 2009
- Country: USA
- Based in: New York City
- Website: gourmet.com (original) gourmetmagazine.net (unaffiliated newsletter) buffetmagazine.net (rebranded newsletter)
- ISSN: 0017-2553

Gourmet magazine was a monthly publication of Condé Nast and the first U.S. magazine devoted to food and wine. The New York Times noted that "Gourmet was to food what Vogue is to fashion." Founded by Earle R. MacAusland (1890–1980), Gourmet, first published in January 1941, also covered "good living" on a wider scale, and grew to incorporate culture, travel, and politics into its food coverage. James Oseland, an author and editor in chief of rival food magazine Saveur, called Gourmet "an American cultural icon."

The magazine's contributors included James Beard, Laurie Colwin, M.F.K. Fisher, Lucius Beebe, George Plimpton, Anita Loos, Paul Theroux, Ray Bradbury, Annie Proulx, Elizabeth David, Madhur Jaffrey, and David Foster Wallace, whose essay "Consider the Lobster" appeared in Gourmet in 2004.

On October 5, 2009, Condé Nast announced that Gourmet would cease monthly publication by the end of 2009, due to a decline in advertising sales and shifting food interests among the readership. Editor Ruth Reichl, in the middle of a tour promoting the Gourmet Today cookbook, confirmed that the magazine's November 2009 issue, distributed in mid-October, was the magazine's last.

The Gourmet brand continues to be used by Condé Nast for book and television programming and recipes appearing on Epicurious.com. Since the end of its regular run, Condé Nast has also used the Gourmet brand in a series of special edition magazines, covering niches ranging from grilling and Italian food, to quick recipes, holiday foods, and comfort foods.

In 2021, the trademark registration lapsed, and in January 2026, a group of five food journalists launched an online newsletter called Gourmet, unaffiliated with the original Gourmet or Condé Nast. Condé Nast sued for trademark infringement, and in August 2026, the new publication changed its name to Buffet Magazine.

== History ==
=== Founding and early years ===
First issue of Gourmet, January 1941

Gourmet was founded by Earle MacAusland who went on to serve as publisher and editor in chief for nearly forty years. Its first issue, dated January 1941, announced that the new magazine was to be for "the honest seeker of the summum bonum of living." Its main competitor at the time was American Cookery, formerly the Boston Cooking School Magazine, also known as the “Boston Cooking-school Magazine Of Culinary Science And Domestic Economics”, which had been published since 1896. The Boston Cooking Magazine was founded by S.S. Pierce, a man who MacAusland took a lot of inspiration and lessons from. Much of the content was similar – articles on food, recipes by the magazine, recipes submitted by readers, recipes requested by readers and advice sought by readers. But American Cookery was illustrated in black-and-white, printed on newsprint, with smaller pages and content focused on America. Gourmet was upscale, slick, in color, with a focus on Europe and New York City, and most of its recipes carrying French names. In 1947, American Cookery closed, in part due to the rise of Gourmet. From 1945 to 1965, Gourmet's offices were located in the Plaza Hotel, in New York. In 1965, the magazine established its own test kitchen.

James Beard came on as an editor at Gourmet in the 1940s, becoming its restaurant critic in 1949. He left in 1950 after feuding with MacAusland, but returned in 1969. At some point, Craig Claiborne worked as a receptionist.

The publication introduced two popular features: "You Asked for It!," in which the magazine's staff answered recipe requests from readers, and "Sugar and Spice," which allowed readers to respond to each other's queries. In the 1950s, the magazine transitioned from illustration to photography under the supervision of Jane Montant, who would go on to become the magazine's executive editor from the early 1960s to 1980, and its editor in chief from 1980 to 1991.

=== Subsequent years ===
MacAusland died in 1980. Condé Nast bought the magazine in 1983. Montant remained editor in chief until 1991, when she retired. During Montant's tenure, Gourmet's circulation rose from 671,000 to 895,000. Montant was succeeded by Gail Zweigenthal, who had been working at the magazine since 1965.

In January 1999, it was announced that Ruth Reichl would leave her post as restaurant critic of The New York Times to become editor in chief of Gourmet. (Reichl had joined the Times in 1993; previously, she had been the restaurant critic for The Los Angeles Times.) Gourmet then had a circulation of about 880,000. Reichl was seen to raise the ambition level of Gourmet, introducing stories on such subjects as the plight of migrant tomato pickers in Florida, not-so-sustainably farm-raised salmon, and the ethical questions generated by boiling lobsters alive (in David Foster Wallace's now widely read piece "Consider the Lobster"). The magazine went on to win a number of National Magazine and James Beard Awards, and, with Houghton Mifflin Harcourt publishers, brought out The Gourmet Cookbook in 2004. The book featured 1,200 recipes published in the magazine over the previous 60 years. (In 2002, the Modern Library published Endless Feasts: Sixty Years Of Writing From Gourmet.)

The magazine poured extensive resources into developing and testing recipes, with 12 test-kitchen chefs and an in-house photographer. Food costs alone ran to over $100,000 a year.

The English journalist and food writer Jay Rayner noted that "Working for Gourmet was like flying the Atlantic first class. It ruined you for other food magazines. It wasn't just the pay, which could be multiple dollars per word. It was also the awe inspiring heft of the operation: the way food photography events were organised like they were Hollywood movie shoots, complete with casting calls and on-site catering; the attentions of the many editors; the pursuit by dreaded fact checkers."

In January 2008, Gourmet launched its own website. (Its content had previously been funneled into Epicurious.) The site included stories, reviews, videos, recipes, and archival material dating to the magazine's launch in 1941. Contributors included John T. Edge, Michael Pollan, Eric Ripert, Heston Blumenthal, and Colman Andrews. Reichl had been lobbying Condé Nast for a standalone Gourmet site since 1999. (To the chagrin of the magazine's staff, Gourmet's recipes would continue to appear on the Epicurious site.)

=== Closure ===
On October 5, 2009, Condé Nast Publications CEO Chuck Townsend announced that, as part of the continuing fallout from the economic downturn of 2008, the magazine would cease monthly publication; the company, he said, would "remain committed to the brand, retaining Gourmet's book publishing and television programming, and Gourmet recipes on Epicurious. We will concentrate our publishing activities in the epicurean category on Bon Appétit." Townsend acknowledged the difficulties for magazines in the wake of the economic meltdown of 2008. Reichl noted, "Our biggest advertising categories were automotive, banking, beauty, travel, high-end appliances and virtually that whole market was hit.” The decision to close the magazine was unexpected; the chef and restaurateur Alice Waters is said to have nearly cried when she heard the news of Gourmet's demise. (The magazine's circulation was about 980,000.)

In the aftermath of the announcement that Gourmet was folding, a new cookbook, Gourmet Today, released a few weeks before the news, saw a significant spike in sales. The cookbook included over 1,000 recipes for everything from vegetable dishes to cocktails.

In December 2009, the 3,500 cookbooks in Gourmet's research library were acquired by the Fales Library of New York University.

In September 2010, Condé Nast revived the brand as an app, but stopped updating it two years later.

In 2019, Reichl published Save Me the Plums, a memoir of her time at Gourmet.

=== Trademark lapse and relaunch ===
In 2021, the trademark registration lapsed, and in January 2026, a group of five food journalists launched a worker-owned online newsletter on Ghost using the name. However, after Condé Nast filed suit to protect the trademark, the publication rebranded as Buffet magazine.

== Editors ==
As of 2009, the editor in chief for Gourmet was Ruth Reichl. The executive editor was John Willoughby, the executive food editor was Kemp M. Minifie, and the executive chef was Sara Moulton.

Editors in chief:

- Pearl V. Mezelthin (1941–1943)
- Earle R. MacAusland (1943–1980)
- Jane Montant (1980–1991)
- Gail Zweigenthal (1991–1998)
- Ruth Reichl (1999–2009)

== Expansion into television ==
Gourmet's Diary of a Foodie premiered on PBS in October 2006. The series won a James Beard Foundation Award in 2008. In October 2009, Gourmet's Adventures With Ruth premiered on PBS as a follow-up to Gourmet's Diary of a Foodie. The show featured Reichl visiting cooking schools around the world with well-known chefs.

== See also ==
- List of food and drink magazines
