= Who's Who of Food and Beverage in America =

The Who's Who of Food and Beverage in America was an award from the James Beard Foundation that was given during the period of 1991-2018.

It was presented to members of the food and beverage industry who have been "identified by his or her peers as having displayed remarkable talent and achievement." The Who's Who awards were voted on by past honorees, with a ballot of 20 candidates distributed to the entire Who's Who group each year. The honors were initially awarded by Cook's Magazine (the predecessor to Cook's Illustrated), which inaugurated the award in 1984 but ceased publication in 1990. The award was administered by the James Beard Foundation from 1990 to 2018 and presented at the annual gala.

The foundation decided to retire the awards after 2018, citing a new commitment to inclusion. Including the inductees from the 1980s, the final Who's Who list included nearly 300 individuals.

Who's Who list by year
Year	Inductees	Ref
1991	David Bouley, Ken Hom, Bryan Miller, Michel Richard, Nancy Silverton	
1992	Albert Kumin, Julee Rosso, Sheila Lukins, Drew Nieporent, Jane and Michael Stern, Patricia Wells	
1993	Ariane and Michael Batterberry, Gael Greene, Robert M. Parker, Jr., Carl Sontheimer, Chuck Williams, Gregory Usher	
1994	Jean Anderson, Cecily Brownstone, Narcisse Chamberlain, Ariane Daguin, George Faison, Joel Dean, Giorgio DeLuca, Zack Hanle, Nancy Harmon Jenkins, Elizabeth Schneider, Jeff Smith, Tim and Nina Zagat	
1995	Rick Bayless, Joachim Splichal, Harold McGee, Daniel Boulud, Milton Glaser, Madhur Jaffrey, Martha Stewart	
1996	Lidia Bastianich, Christopher Kimball, Zelma Long, Nick Malgieri, Danny Meyer, Jean-Jacques Rachou, Charlie Trotter	
1997	Flo Braker, Barbara Haber, Graham Kerr, Michael and Timothy Mondavi, Julian Niccolini, Alex von Bidder, Adam Tihany	
1998	Paula Lambert, Carolyn O'Neil, Charles Palmer, Alan Richman, Jean-Georges Vongerichten	
1999	R. W. Apple Jr., Ernest Gallo, Molly O'Neill, Bill Shore, Gail Zweigenthal	
2000	Barbara Fairchild, Thomas Keller, Michael Romano, Jeffrey Steingarten, Larry Stone	
2001	Mario Batali, Michael Ginor, Izzy Yanay, Lynne Rossetto Kasper, Joan Nathan, Martin Yan	
2002	Tom Colicchio, Alain Ducasse, Nobu Matsuhisa, Sara Moulton, Frank J. Prial	
2003	Hubert Keller, Marion Nestle, Alain Sailhac, Jacques Torres, Norman Van Aken	
2004	Michael Bauer, Rose Levy Beranbaum, Todd English, Andrea Immer, Eric Ripert	
2005	Joseph Bastianich, Greg Drescher, Carol Field, Corby Kummer, Deborah Madison	
2006	Sue Conley, Peggy Smith, Jean Joho, Gray Kunz, Kermit Lynch, Ari Weinzweig	
2007	José Andrés, Jim Clendenen, Bobby Flay, Dorie Greenspan, Michael Pollan	
2008	Dan Barber, Anthony Bourdain, Nancy Oakes, Russ Parsons, Zanne Early Stewart, Steve Sullivan	
2009	David Burke, John T. Edge, Betty Fussell, Dorothy Cann Hamilton, Clark Wolf	
2010	Leah Chase, Jessica B. Harris, Paul C. P. McIlhenny, David Rockwell, L. Timothy Ryan, Susan Spicer	
2011	Jonathan Gold, Lee Jones, Charles Phan, Frank Stitt, Nick Valenti	
2012	Grant Achatz, Mark Bittman, Dana Cowin, Emily Luchetti, Marvin Shanken	
2013	Eric Asimov, Dorothy Kalins, Barbara Lynch, Zarela Martinez, Michael Mina, Bill Yosses	
2014	Edward Behr, John Besh, David Chang, Barry Estabrook, Paul Kahan, Sherry Yard	
2015	Allan Benton, Dale DeGroff, Wylie Dufresne, Nathalie Dupree, Maricel Presilla	
2016	Gina Gallo, Jim Lahey, Ed Levine, Temple Grandin, Marcus Samuelsson	
2017	Suzanne Goin, Evan Kleiman, Roger Berkowitz, Michel Nischan, Rajat Parr	
2018	Jody Adams, Lally Brennan, Ti Adelaide Martin, Allison Hooper, Daniel Johnnes	
