= Phyllis Richman =

American writer and food critic

Phyllis Chasanow Richman (born Phyllis Chasanow on March 21, 1939) is an American writer and former food critic for The Washington Post for 23 years, a role that led Newsweek magazine to name her "the most feared woman in Washington". Washingtonian magazine listed her as one of the 100 most powerful women in Washington.

Richman is also the author of three murder mysteries set in the restaurant world, and many articles written for such publications as Gourmet, Bon Appétit, and Food Arts. She has appeared on numerous radio and television shows, including the Diane Rehm Show, NPR's All Things Considered and Weekend Edition, and the Oprah Winfrey Show.

== Personal life ==
The second of four children, Richman was born to Helen and Abraham Chasanow. Her father was a part-time lawyer and a civil servant. After being fired from his US Navy job for being a security risk, Chasanow brought suit; the case eventually secured an apology from the Navy and changes in government regulations. It also led to the movie Three Brave Men (with Ernest Borgnine playing the Chasanow-like character) and to a Pulitzer Prize-winning article in the Washington Daily News by Anthony Lewis. Helen Chasanow worked as a real-estate agent. When Richman was very young, the family moved to the cooperative town of Greenbelt, Maryland, where she grew up in a progressive environment.

Richman enrolled at Brandeis University, from which she graduated with honors in 1961. That same year, she intended to apply for graduate work at Harvard University, but received a letter from a professor in the Department of City and Regional Planning who doubted that she would be able to combine academic work with "responsibilities to [her] husband and a possible future family". Instead, Richman did graduate work in urban planning at the University of Pennsylvania, and later in sociology at Purdue University.

Following her junior year of college, she married Alvin Richman, who went on to teach political science at Purdue before specializing in public opinion polling for the United States Information Agency and the State Department. They had three children — Joe, the producer of Radio Diaries on NPR; Matt, an audio engineer; and Libby, a TV producer — before they divorced in 1985. Richman has six grandkids named Mayim, Kirk, Adi, Zeke, Ivy, and Asa. Richman was married to Bob Burton, a retired statistician at the US Department of Education, before he died in 2020. She lived in Takoma Park, Maryland before moving to a retirement home in Washington, D.C. In 2009, Richman was diagnosed with Parkinson's disease, but continues to contribute freelance articles to various publications.

== Career ==
Richman began her career as a food critic at the Baltimore Jewish Times, where she worked for two years. In 1976, she was hired by The Washington Post and served as that newspaper's restaurant critic until her retirement in 2000. She was the first woman to hold that position. She also served as the newspaper's Food Editor from 1980 to 1987. Her nationally syndicated weekly column "Richman's Table" appeared from 1985 to 1989. Between 1973 and 1980, she wrote several other columns, including one on feeding children (1973–1976), "Try It" (1974–1980), and "Turning Tables", which appeared in the Washington Post Magazine from 1976 to 1980, and in the Washington Post Weekend section from 1980 to 1990. As a restaurant critic, Richman "kept a low profile, was rarely photographed, and often wore a silk scarf over the bottom of her face when she went out in public".

Until her retirement, Richman served on the James Beard Restaurant Awards committee and also on the International Association of Culinary Professionals Cookbook Awards executive committee, as well as on the editorial board of Gastronomica: The Journal of Food and Culture.

Richman turned to prose in the mid-1990s, publishing her first culinary murder mystery, The Butter Did It: A Gastronomic Tale of Love and Murder, in 1997. Publishers Weekly reviewed it: "Richman's prose is as smooth and easy to swallow as premium ice cream... She brings a welcome angle and authenticity to the expanding menu of culinary mysteries."

=== Awards ===
Awards include the Productive Aging Award, Jewish Council for the Aging, 2010; Duke Zeibert Capital Achievement Award, Restaurant Association of Metropolitan Washington, 2006; Penney-Missouri Journalism Honorable Mention (for movie review on the role of food in The Godfather Part III); First Place, Best Newspaper Section, Association of Food Journalists (1986); Nominee, James Beard Foundation newspaper awards, 1994, 1996, 1997; Who's Who of Food and Beverage in America (James Beard Foundation, 1985).

=== Novels ===
- The Butter Did It: A Gastronomic Tale of Love and Murder (HarperCollins, 1997; nominated for an Agatha award)
- Murder on the Gravy Train (HarperCollins, 1999)
- Who's Afraid of Virginia Ham (HarperCollins, 2001)

=== Other books ===
- Best Restaurants & Others: Washington, DC (101 Productions, 1980, 1982, 1985; Ortho, 1989)
- The Washington Post Dining Guide (1996, 1998)
- Barter: How to Get Almost Anything Without Money (with Constance Stapleton) (Scribner, 1978)
