= Bertagni =

Italian food company

Bertagni 1882 S.p.A.
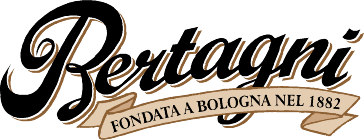
- Type: Società per azioni
- Industry: Italian food
- Founded: 1882 in Bologna
- Headquarters: Arcugnano VI, Italy
- Products: Food
- Website: www.bertagni.it

Bertagni is an Italian food company founded in Bologna by Luigi Bertagni in 1882.

== History ==
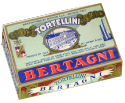
Tortellini pack

The birth of "Pastificio Bertagni" was in 1882 in the workshop of Luigi Bertagni in Bologna. Luigi Bertagni, with his brothers Ferdinando and Oreste, not only made quality fresh tortellini, but also studied a method in order to package and conserve them, and thus Luigi developed his business.

Thanks to the entrepreneurial spirit of Bertagni brothers, their tortellini saw greater sales in Italy and abroad. The Bertagni brothers entered their pastas in numerous World Fairs, winning the bronze medal at The World's Fair in Paris in 1889 and at The Chicago Fair in 1894, and the gold medal in St. Louis in 1904.

Pastificio Bertagni continued its rapid growth and by the beginning of the 20th century was a well known pasta producer. The Bologna Commercial Guide described the company: "Tortellini from Bologna, whose fame went across the seas, by all the gourmets are reputed astoundingly good! It is the Bologna company Bertagni that holds the record of this production and sells tortellini all over the world."

In 1986, the gastronomic critic Corby Kummer declared: "Bertagni specialty filled pastas ... are excellent and are the closest thing to having a pasta store down the street."

In 2002, the company was sold to pasta industry veterans, resulting in a great increase in sales.
