= Gian Carlo Grassi =

Italian mountaineer and alpine guide

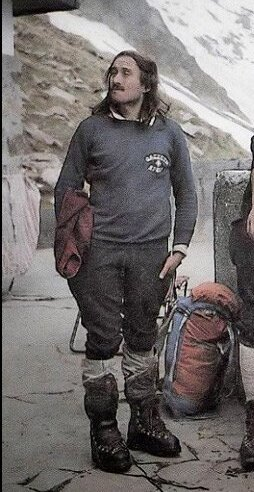
- Grassi at the terrace of the Monzino Hut in August 1978

Personal information
- Born: October 14, 1946 Condove
- Died: April 1, 1991 (aged 44) Monte Bove

Sport
- Country: Italy
- Sport: Mountaineering
- Event: Ice climbing

Gian Carlo Grassi (Condove, October 14, 1946 - Monte Bove, April 1, 1991) was an Italian mountaineer and mountain guide. He was a pioneer of ice climbing in Italy in the 1980s, making many first ascents among waterfalls and goulotte in high mountains.

== Biography ==
Originally from Val di Susa, in the 1970s he was part of the “New Morning” movement, where he associated with, among others, Gian Piero Motti and Danilo Galante. These were the years of climbing routes in Orco Valley, on the Caporal and the Sergent, and bouldering on erratic blocks in the lower Val di Susa.

Towards the end of the 1970s, Grassi became passionate about the emerging discipline of icefall climbing and soon became a leading figure. Grassi also succeeded in applying ice climbing techniques to high mountains, becoming a specialist in climbing so-called phantom couloirs, gullies where snow and ice create a climbable route only in winter.

During these years, he met Gianni Comino and together they accomplished a series of significant ascents in the Mont Blanc massif. In 1978, they opened a new goulotte on the north face of the Aiguille Verte and the Ypercouloir on the south face of the Grandes Jorasses. In the summer of 1979, they undertook the extremely dangerous ascent of two seracs: on 4 July, the serac of Col Maudit, and on 11 August, the one to the left of the Poire. It was on a serac that, a few months later, Gianni Comino, just twenty-eight years old, lost his life. On 28 February 1980, after a thorough study of the terrain conditions, Comino attempted a solo ascent of the serac to the right of the Poire, but near the exit, a collapse of ice caused him to fall.

After Comino’s death, Grassi continued his ice exploration, climbing new icefalls throughout Piedmont and the Aosta Valley: in Valle Orco, Valli di Lanzo, Val di Susa, Val Varaita, and Val di Cogne. In 1983, with Isidoro Meneghin, he opened a new route on Monte Rosa, along the Pilastro Vincent at 4,050 m in one of the wildest sectors of the Valle Gressoney face of Monte Rosa. Rated TD-. He also climbed abroad: in California, Canada, the Andes, Patagonia, and the Himalayas. In 1984, with Renato Casarotto and Guido Ghigo, he climbed Pomme d’Or in Quebec (180 meters of stalactite), Polar Circus, and Slipstream (a 900-meter icefall) in the Canadian Rockies. In 1985, with Mauro Rossi, he repeated the Supercanaleta route on Fitz Roy.

In the early 1980s, the mountaineer cataloged and described numerous routes on the erratic blocks of the lower Valle di Susa in the book Sassismo spazio per la fantasia.

At forty-four, still at the height of his mountaineering career, Grassi lost his life on 1 April 1991 after climbing the Torre di Luna icefall on Monte Bove in the Sibillini Mountains, due to the collapse of a snow cornice.

In 2011, the new Giuseppe Lampugnani Bivouac at the Eccles Col (Mont Blanc) was dedicated to him.

== Ascents in the Alps ==
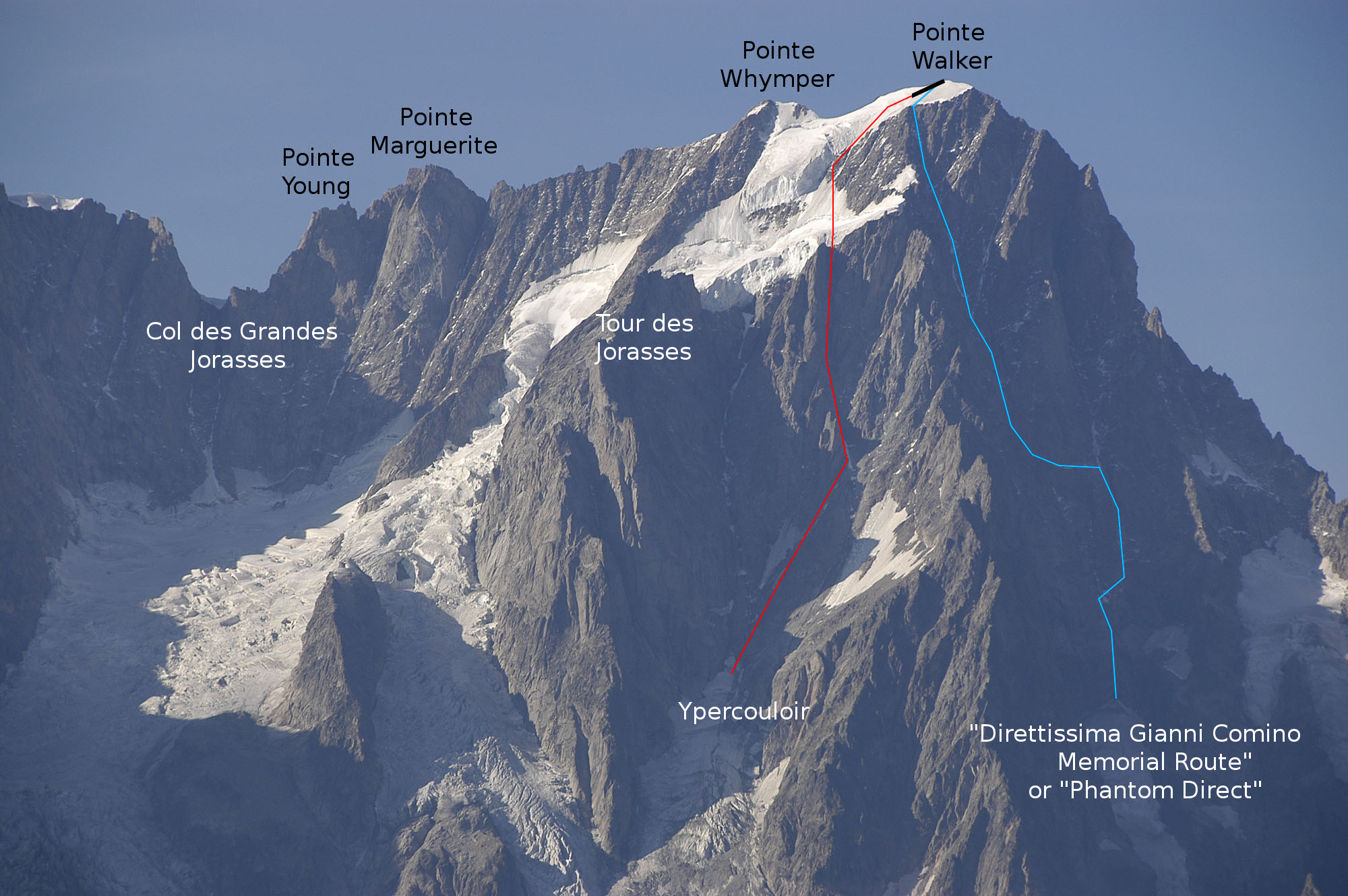
The south face of the Grandes Jorasses with the Ypercouloir route of 1978 and the Direttissima of 1985

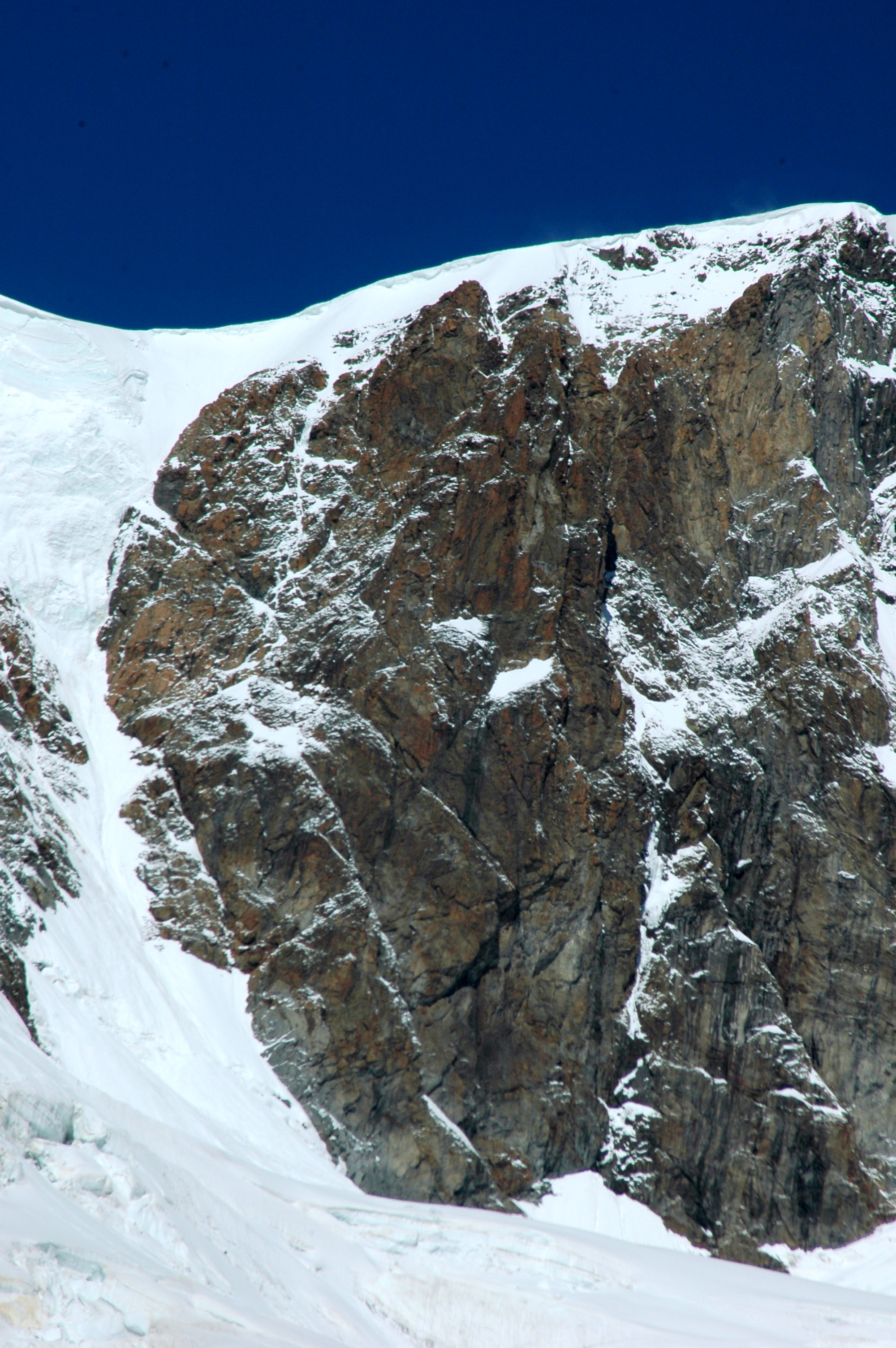
Valle Gressoney face of Monte Rosa, Pilastro Vincent m.4050

The following list includes some of Gian Carlo Grassi’s most significant ascents in the Alps.

- Via Grassi-Re - Southern Becco della Tribolazione - 6 October 1968 - First ascent with Alberto Re, 250 m/VI+
- Via del Naso - Bec di Mea - January 1969 - First ascent with Gian Piero Motti, 170 m, 5c/A1
- Sole Nascente - Caporal - 18 April 1973 - First ascent with Mike Kosterlitz and Gian Piero Motti
- Cannabis Rock - Sergent - 1973 - First ascent with Danilo Galante
- Goulotte Comino-Grassi-Casarotto - Aiguille Verte - 18 July 1978 - First ascent with Gianni Comino and Renato Casarotto, north face, 1000 m IV/4+
- Ypercouloir Grassi-Comino - Grandes Jorasses - 20 August 1978 - First ascent with Gianni Comino, south face
- Via del Gran Diedro - Mont Maudit/Southwest Shoulder - 26–27 August 1978 - First ascent with Giovanni Groaz
- Seracco del Col Maudit - Col Maudit - 4 July 1979 - First ascent with Gianni Comino, 350 m V/5-6
- Seracco a sinistra della Poire - Mont Blanc/Brenva - 11 August 1979 - First ascent with Gianni Comino
- Goulotte Comino-Grassi - Col Maudit - 2 September 1979 - First ascent with Gianni Comino, 300 m III/4
- Goulotte Grassi-Bernardi o Del Gran Diedro - Roccia Nera - 1980 - First ascent with Marco Bernardi, 500 m, V/5
- Goulotte Grassi - Ailefroide West - 3 July 1980 - First ascent with Renzo Luzi and Franco Salino, northwest face, 730 m/TD+.
- Cascata del Freney - Mont Blanc - 3 September 1980 - First ascent with Marco Bernardi and Renzo Luzi
- Emeraude de droite - Ailefroide East - 14 March 1982 - First ascent with Carlo Stratta, 450 m/TD
- Via Grassi-Meneghin - Punta Gugliermina - 23 July 1982 - First ascent with Isidoro Meneghin, 650 m/VI-/TD+
- Goulotte Grassi-Tessera - Monte Ferra - 16 March 1983 - First ascent with Enrico Tessera, 350 m, IV/4
- Pilastro Vincent per lo spigolo sud-est - Valle Gressoney face of Monte Rosa - 13 July 1983 - First ascent with Isidoro Meneghin, 350 m/V+/TD-
- Via Casarotto-Grassi - Pic Tyndall - 29 September 1983 - First ascent with Renato Casarotto, 1300 m/ED.
- Filo di Arianna - Monte Maudit/Northeast Shoulder - 5 July 1984 - First ascent with A. Faré and C. Longhi
- Via Grassi-Meneghin - Col Maudit/Left Pillar of the Three Gendarmes - 19 August 1984 - First ascent with Isidoro Meneghin
- Lacrima degli Angeli - Col Maudit - 5 February 1985 - First ascent with Carlo Stratta, 350 m III/5
- Direttissima Gianni Comino Memorial Route o Phantom Direct - Grandes Jorasses - 19 June 1985 - First ascent with Renzo Luzi and Mauro Rossi, 1400 m, VI/6, the route remained unrepeated for 25 years until 2010
- Overcouloir - Monte Maudit - 13 October 1986 - First ascent with Nello Margaria and Angelo Siri, 700 m, IV/5
- Goulotte Valeria - Petit Capucin - 26 June 1987 - First ascent with Valeria Rudatis, 400 m III/4
- Via Grassi-Ghirardi-Barus - Mont Blanc/Quota 3095 meters - 13 September 1990 - First ascent with M. Ghirardi and F. Baraus, Grassi’s last route opened on Mont Blanc

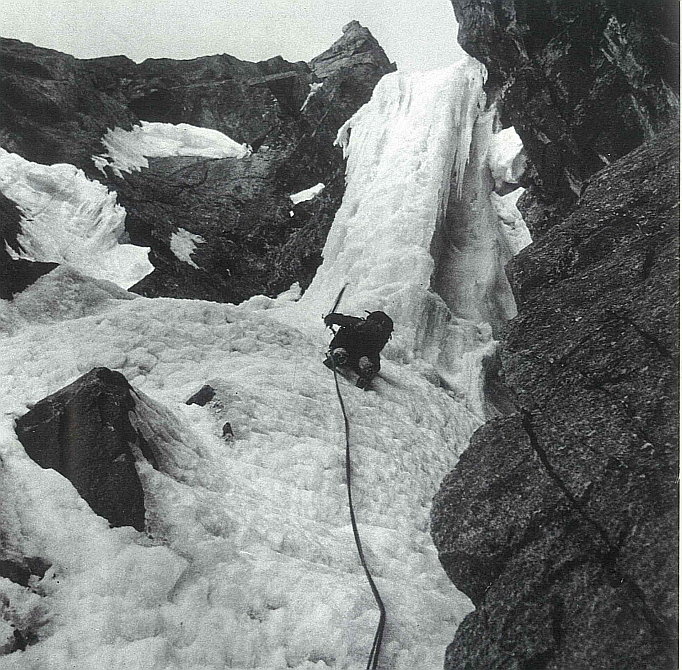
The Ypercouloir, the goulotte opened by Grassi and Comino in 1978 on the south face of the Grandes Jorasses. In the photo, taken by Grassi, Comino is engaged on the second pitch.

== Icefalls ==
The following list includes some of the most significant icefalls climbed by Gian Carlo Grassi.

- Balma Fiorant - Orco Valley - 1979 - First ascent with Gianni Comino, 160 m I/4
- Cascata Pian dei Morti - 1981 - Val d’Ala - First ascent with E. Cavallo, III/4+,5
- Cold Couloir - 20 December 1985 - Val di Cogne - First ascent with Nello Margaria, 600 m IV/4+
- Lillaz Gully - Val di Cogne - January 1986 - First ascent with Nello Margaria, 200 m II/4
- L’altro volto del pianeta - Valle Argentera - 26 January 1986 - First ascent with Nello Margaria, II/5, the first ED+ difficulty icefall in the Western Alps
- Dies Irae - 1988 - Val Troncea - First ascent with Sergio Rossi and Piero Marchisio, 100 m V/6 ED+
- Il Cero di Natale - Valle di Viù - 24 December 1988 - First ascent with Elio Bonfanti, Fulvio Conta, and Angelo Siri, IV/5
- Repentance Super - Val di Cogne - 2 March 1989 - First ascent with François Damilano and Fulvio Conta, 220 m III/5+, the most difficult in the Aosta Valley at the time
- Un giorno di ordinaria Follia - Satanik Pencil - Valle di Viù - 1989 - First ascent with Sergio Rossi, II/5

== Filmography ==
- L’uomo dal Giardino di Cristallo, directed by Angelo Siri (2009)

== Bibliography ==
- Labande, François (1988). Monte Bianco [Mont Blanc] (in Italian). Vol. 1 Vallot Guide. Edizioni Mediterranee. ISBN 88-272-0239-0.
- Cambiolo, Aldo; Grassi, Gian Carlo (1994). Diamanti di cristallo. Guida alle cascate di ghiaccio della Valle d'Aosta [Crystal Diamonds. Guide to the Icefalls of the Aosta Valley] (in Italian). Cda & Vivalda. ISBN 978-88-7808-409-4.
- Sertori, Mario (2004). Cascate. Alpi Centrali. Lombardia e Svizzera [Icefalls. Central Alps. Lombardy and Switzerland] (in Italian). Blu Edizioni. ISBN 978-88-87417-95-1.
- Damilano, François (2005). Neige, glace et mixte [Snow, Ice, and Mixed] (in French). Vol. 1. JMEditions. ISBN 978-2-9521881-1-1.
- Damilano, François (2006). Neige, glace et mixte [Snow, Ice, and Mixed] (in French). Vol. 2. JMEditions. ISBN 978-2-9521881-3-5.
- Constant, Sébastien (2009). Ascensions en neige et mixte [Snow and Mixed Ascents] (in French). Vol. 1. Editions Constant. ISBN 978-2-918970-00-2.

=== Books by Gian Carlo Grassi ===
- Gian Carlo Grassi, Sassismo spazio per la fantasia Arrampicate sui massi erratici della Valle di Susa, CAI sezione di Torino, 1982
- Gian Carlo Grassi, 100 scalate su cascate di ghiaccio, Gorlich - Istituto Geografico De Agostini, Novara, 1983
- Gian Carlo Grassi, Arrampicata in Valle Susa, Ghibaudo, 1986
- Gian Carlo Grassi, Gran Paradiso e Valli di Lanzo, Zanichelli, 1986
- Gian Carlo Grassi, 90 Scalate su guglie e monoliti, Gorlich, 1987
- Gian Carlo Grassi, Sogno di Sea, 1988
- Gian Carlo Grassi, Ghiaccio dell’Ovest, Associazione Guide Alpine Piemontesi, Club Alpino Italiano, 1989
