= Southern Foodways Alliance =

Institute of the University of Mississippi

Southern Foodways Alliance (SFA) is an institute of the Center for the Study of Southern Culture at the University of Mississippi, dedicated to the documentation, study and exploration of the foodways of the American South. Member-funded, it stages events, recognizes culinary contributions with awards and a hall of fame, produces documentary films, publishes writing, and maps the region’s culinary institutions recording oral history interviews. The group has about 800 members, a mixture of chefs, academics, writers, and eaters.

== Founders and Board ==
John T. Edge, a writer and commentator, has served as the director of the SFA since its foundation in 1999. A journalist, John Egerton, was one of the group's founders. In 2007, the SFA established the John Egerton Prize to recognize annually selected "artists, writers, scholars, and others—including artisans and farmers—whose work in the American South addresses issues of race, class, gender, and social and environmental justice, through the lens of food." John Martin Taylor was also a founding member. Current board members include Francis Lam and Rob Long.

== Annual awards ==
The annual Ruth Fertel Keeper of the Flame Award is made jointly by the Southern Foodways Alliance and the Fertel Foundation, and honors an unsung hero or heroine who has made a great contribution to food. The award was first made in 2000. The honoree receives a monetary award and a documentary film is made about them.

Claiborne Award recipients:

- 2019 Ann Abadie
- 2018 Marcie Cohen Ferris
- 2017 Hugo Ortega
- 2016 Ira Wallace
- 2015 JoAnn Clevenger
- 2014 Sandor Katz
- 2013 Vertamae Grosvenor
- 2012 Ben and Karen Barker
- 2011 Dori Sanders
- 2010 Christiane Lauterbach
- 2009 Ronni Lundy
- 2008 John Folse
- 2007 Allan Benton
- 2006 Frank Stitt
- 2005 Joe Dabney
- 2004 Nathalie Dupree and Jessica B. Harris
- 2003 John Egerton
- 2002 Ella Brennan
- 2001 Marie Rudisill
- 2000 Leah Chase
- 1999 Edna Lewis

== Reception ==
In the Atlantic Monthly, Corby Kummer described the SFA as “this country’s most intellectually engaged (and probably most engaging) food society."
