= Renato Casarotto =

Italian mountaineer (1948–1986)

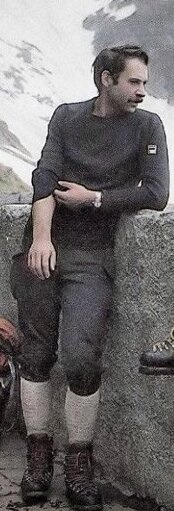
- Casarotto in 1978
- Born: May 15, 1948; Arcugnano, Veneto, Italy
- Died: July 16, 1986 (aged 38); K2, Pakistan
- Cause of death: Injuries from falling into a crevasse
- Occupation: Alpinist
- Known for: First ascents of a number of new routes in the Alps and South America
- Spouse: Goretta Traverso

Renato Casarotto (Arcugnano, 15 May 1948 – K2, 16 July 1986) was an Italian mountaineer.

He was one of the strongest Italian alpinists of the 1970s and 1980s and was famous for his difficult solo winter climbs on the Dolomites and Mont Blanc and for opening new routes for mountains in Patagonia, Peru and in the Karakorum range. He lost his life during an attempt to scale the south-south-west ridge of K2.

== Biography ==
Casarotto began to practice alpinism at the age of 20 in 1968, during his military service as part of the Alpini in Cadore. He had previously only done some hikes in the mountains, some via ferrata and some rock climbing in Valle dei Calvi near his hometown of Arcugnano. During military service he took part in courses on rock and ice climbing and took part in about 20 summits over 5 months.

=== The Dolomites ===
After his military service, Casarotto would spend every weekend on the Piccole Dolomiti to repeat some old routes or to open new ones. He was especially interested in free climbing as opposed to aid climbing.

In 1971 he tried solo climbing as a way to measure himself against the mountains and to find his limits. On the 4th of July he performed a solo climb of the Carlesso route at Soglio Rosso, in the Pasubio group, using only a rudimentary belaying technique. One month later he also performed a solo climb of the Carlesso route of Sengio della Sisilla. He had always preferred to be the lead member of a rope team even when accompanied by capable alpinists, allowing him to easily transition to solo climbing. In 1973 he also began to perform winter ascents.

In 1973 he met Goretta Traverso, though she did not come from a mountaineering background she became important for his later expeditions; they would marry two years later.

In 1974, along with Piero Radin he performed the first ascent on the Casarotto-Radin route on the east face of the Spiz di Lagunaz in the Pale di San Lucano group. In 1975 he performed the first solo winter ascent of the Andrich-Faè route on Monte Civetta.

=== England ===
In 1975 he spent one week in England with other alpinists of the Club Alpino Italiano for a meeting organised by the British Mountaineering Council. In this trip he experienced the high level of free climbing reached by the English who were routinely using climbing shoes and nuts. Casarotto bought his first pair of climbing shoes.

=== Huascarán and Fitz Roy ===
Monte Fitz Roy, with the Goretta Pillar (10)

In 1977 Casarotto left his job as a nurse to dedicate himself professionally to mountaineering, earning a living as a consultant to mountaineering companies as well as by writing books, articles and giving talks. In June of that year he opened a new route on the north face of Huascarán. The ascent took 17 days and was performed solo, completing the ascent despite being without food for the final three days and bivouacking for the final time on the descent without his sleeping bag as he had lost it at the end of the climb. He was assisted only by his wife Goretta Traverso by radio from base camp. This ascent propelled him to international acclaim.

He joined the Messner expedition on K2 in 1979. While the initial plan was to summit along the south-south-west ridge (the "magic lines") this was abandoned due to the expedition arriving late. Messner chose to summit along the well established Abruzzi Spur route, however Casarotto was unable to reach the summit on this occasion as the weather turned before he had his chance. That same year he performed a solo ascent of the Yvon Chouinard route of Mount Watkins in Yosemite Valley, California.

He went to Patagonia in 1979 to perform the first solo climb of the north pillar of Fitz Roy, which is named Goretta after his wife who was assisting him from base camp.

=== The Frêney triple ===
After several years of planning, in 1982 Casarotto launched an attempt to perform solo winter ascents of the three routes of the Frêney Glacier basin back to back without having previously climbed them. Casarotto had first attempted this in 1980 beginning on the south crest of Aiguille Noire de Peuterey, but he had to stop at Welzenbach tower. In his 1982 attempt he started on the west face of Aiguille Noire.

On the 1st of February he began approaching the base of the face with a 40 kg pack containing his tent, climbing equipment and supplies for many days of climbing. He did not bring a radio and did not leave supplies for himself along the route. The following day he started on the Ratti-Vitali route on the west face of Aiguille Noire, reaching the summit on the 4th and slept for the night in his tent before beginning the descent towards the Frêney Glacier, before going back up on the 6th along the Gervasutti-Boccalatte route of Picco Gugliermina.

Between the 7th and 9th he ascended the Gervasutti-Boccalatte route under heavy snow, reaching the Aiguille Blanche de Peuterey, and descending Col de Peuterey, bivouacking for a night.

On the 11th of February he started ascending the Bonington route of the Pilone Centrale del Frêney. After two days he reached the base of the Chandelle, the hardest part of the route. After overcoming this section in difficult weather conditions he reached the summit of Mont Blanc on the 14th under heavy fog, before descending the next day to Chamonix along the French side.

=== Other solo climbs ===
Between the 30th of December 1982 and the 9th of January 1983 he performed a solo climb of the north face of the Piccolo Mangart di Coritenza in the Julian Alps, a route that had been opened by Enzo Cozzolino of Trieste, a route that Messner had described as a precursor to the 7th grade.

In April 1984 he climbed the West spur of Denali along the south-east ridge (nicknamed "the ridge of no return").

In 1985, he performed the first solo winter climb of the Gervasutti route on the east face of the Grandes Jorasses.

In 1985 he also climbed Gasherbrum II, along with his wife Goretta Traverso who became the first Italian woman to reach the peak of one of the eight-thousanders.

=== K2: south-south-west spur and accident on the return ===
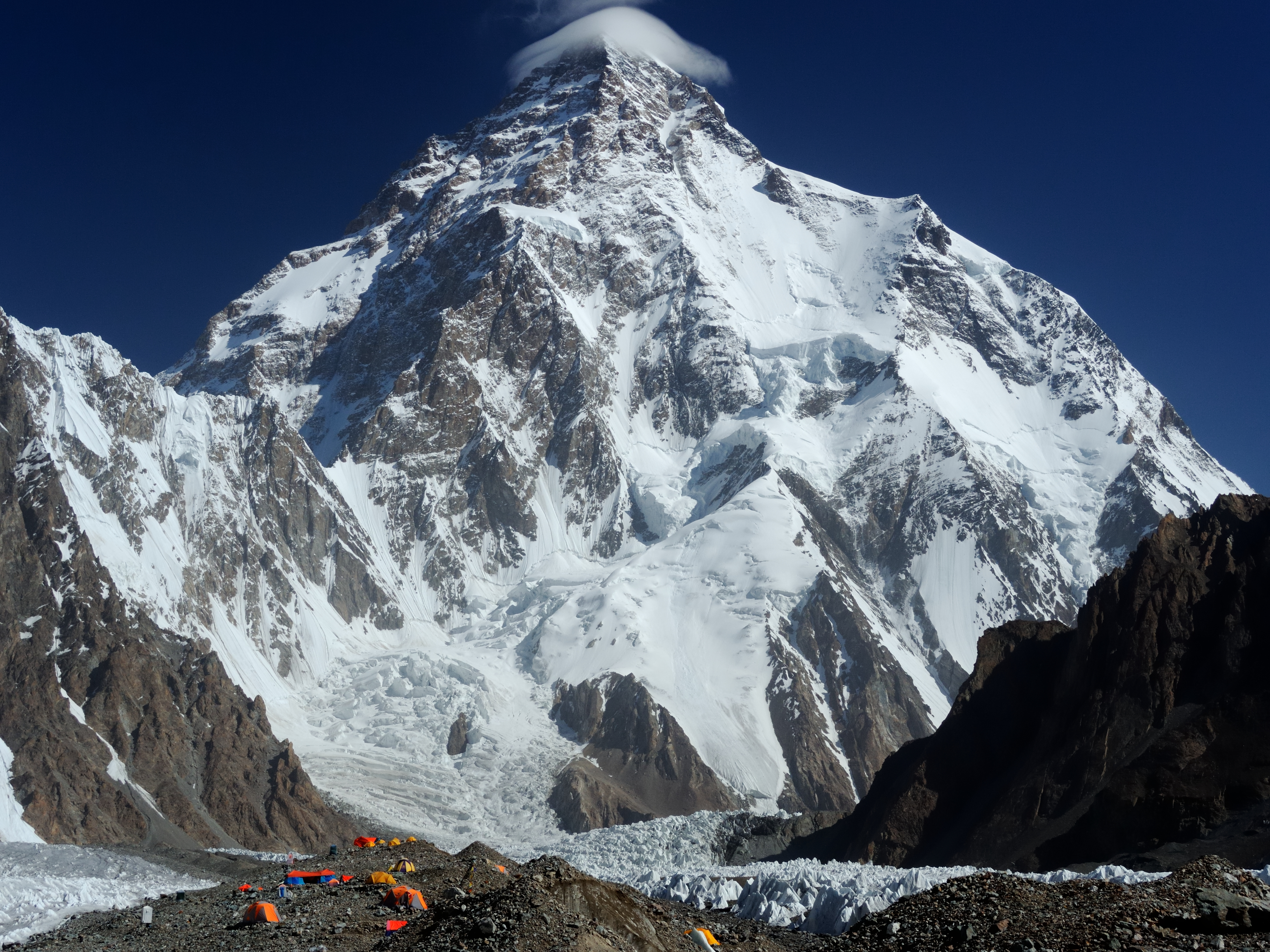
K2 with the de Filippi glacier, the site of the accident.

In 1986 Casarotto attempted to climb the south-south-west spur of K2 along a route attempted by a 1979 French expedition. At 300 meters from the summit he made the decision to turn back due to a change in the weather. On the descent from the Negrotto col and only a short distance from base camp, an ice bridge collapsed under his weight on the de Filippi glacier and Casarotto fell 40 meters to the bottom of a crevasse.

Casarotto was able to raise the alarm by radio and was able to summon the Italians of the Quote 8000 group who had been following his descent with binoculars and saw him disappear into the crevasse. Though still alive he was gravely injured, rescuers were able to bring him back to the surface but after attempting to walk a few steps he collapsed on his backpack and died shortly afterwards from numerous internal haemorrhage on the 16th of July. He was laid to rest in the same crevasse into which he had fallen, following the wishes of his wife, Goretta.

After 17 years, the moving of the glaciers caused his remains to become exposed. They were found in August 2003 by a group of climbers from Kazakhstan, who moved the remains to the Gilkey Memorial, and a memorial plaque is placed there in 2005.

== Ascents in the Alps ==
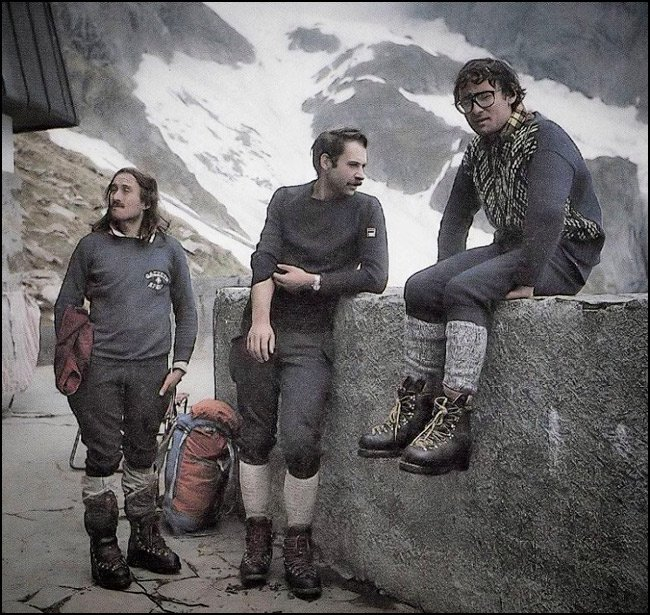
From left to right:Gian Carlo Grassi, Casarotto and Gianni Comino in August 1978

List of Casarotto's most notable climbs in the Alps:

- Solledar Route – Sass Maor – December 1972 – Winter ascent with Adriana Valdo, Renato Gobbato, Renzo Timellero, Paolo and Ludovico Cappellari.
- Monte Civetta/Torre Trieste – 18–19 March 1973 – Winter ascent with fifteen year old Diego Campi.
- Monte Civetta – August 1973 – Full traverse with Giacomo Albiero in five days ascending 22 peaks with 4000 meters of election change.
- Casarotto-Campi route – Pasubio/Soglio Rosso – 1 May 1973 – First ascent with Diego Campi, 270 m/VI+.
- Spigolo Strobel – Rocchetta Alta di Bosconero – March 1974 – First winter ascent with Diego Campi and Piero Radin.
- Simon-Rossi route – Pelmo – 19–23 December 1974 – First solo winter ascent.
- Andrich-Faè route – Monte Civetta – 22–27 February 1975 – First solo winter ascent.
- Casarotto-Radin route – Pale di San Lucano/Spiz di Lagunaz – 8–11 June 1975 – First ascent with Piero Radin.
- Casarotto route – Cima Busazza – 1976 – First ascent with Giuseppe Cogato and Giacomo Albiero, 1000 m/ED.
- Casarotto-De Donà route – Pale di San Lucano/Spiz di Lagunaz – 1977 – First ascent with Bruno De Donà, Casarotto rates the route VII grade.
- Goulotte Comino-Grassi-Casarotto – Aiguille Verte – 18 July 1978 – First ascent with Gianni Comino and Gian Carlo Grassi, north face, 1000 mIV/4+.
- Casarotto-Albiero route – North West face Civetta – 15–16 September 1979 – First ascent with Giacomo Albiero, V+ grade with some VI sections.
- Frêney triple: Ratti-Vitali route on Aiguille Noire de Peuterey, Gervasutti-Boccalatte route on Picco Gugliermina and classic route on Pilone Centrale del Freney – 1–15 February 1982 – Ascents performed successively in winter with no re-stocking along the route.
- Diedro Cozzolino – Piccolo Mangart di Coritenza – from 30 December 1982 to 9 January 1983 – First solo winter ascent.
- Casarotto-Grassi route – Pic Tyndall – 29 September 1983 – First ascent with Gian Carlo Grassi, 1300 m/ED.
- Gervasutti route – Grandes Jorasses – March 1985 – First solo winter ascent, 550 m/ED.

== Non-European ascents ==
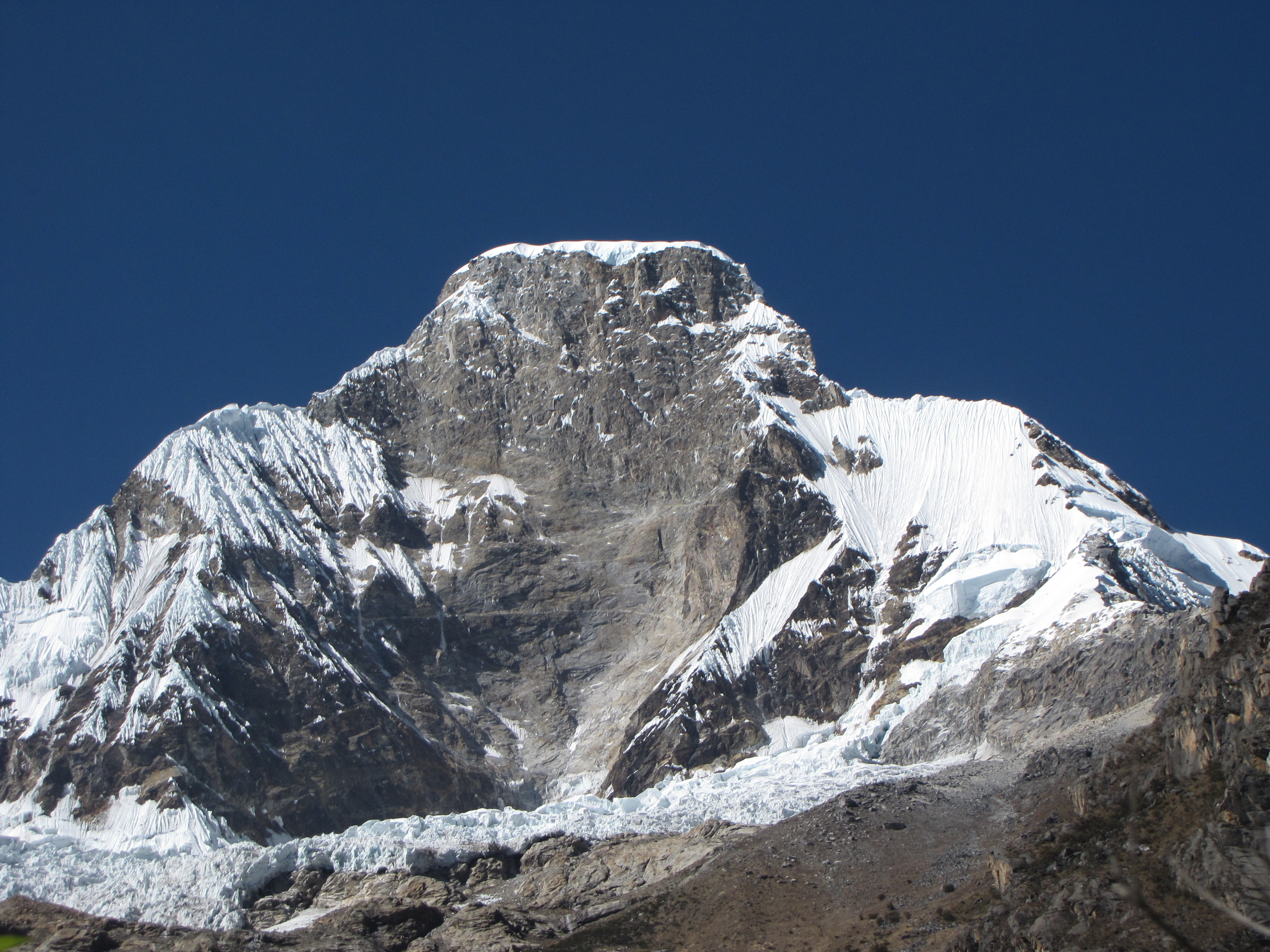
North face of Nevado Huascaran

- Huandoy South – 6 July 1975 – New route on the south face
- Huandoy East – 6 August 1975 – New route on the north-east ridge.
- Huascarán – 5–21 June 1977 – New route opened solo on the previously unclimbed north face of the northern peak.
- Yosemite/Mount Watkins – 1978 – First solo ascent of the Yvon Chouinard route on the south face.
- Fitz Roy – January 1979 – New route opened on the previously un-conquered North-East pillar.
- Makalu – 1980 – Failed attempt at a solo winter ascent along the southeast ridge.
- Broad Peak North – 21–28 June 1983 – First ascent of the 7550 m peak belonging to Broad Peak, along the north spur.
- Diamond Peak – 1984 – Opens a new route.
- Denali – April 1984 – Solo ascent along the South-East ridge in 12 days.
- Gasherbrum II – July 1985 – Ascent with his wife, Goretta Traverso, who becomes the first Italian woman to summit one of the eight-thousanders.
- K2 – June–July 1986 – Casarotto made three attempts on the South-South-West ridge, reaching 8200m on the 23rd of June, a similar height on the 5th of July and 8300m in mid July. He lost his life on the way back to base camp.

== Casarotto Kor ==
An expedition to Pakistan was launched called "Chiantar 2000", organized by the Club Alpino Italiano of Montecchio Maggiore which summited a number of previously unconquered mountains on the Hindu Raj mountain chain. Among these was Garmush II (6244m), which was renamed Renato Casarotto Kor in his honor.

== Other media ==
The theatrical show Due Amori, adapted from a text by Nazareno Marinon, tells his story.

The film Solo di cordata (2015) was produced by Davide Riva to tell his story using previously un-released materials as well as testimonies from his friends and climbing partners.
