= Clinton, Georgia =

- Unincorporated settlement
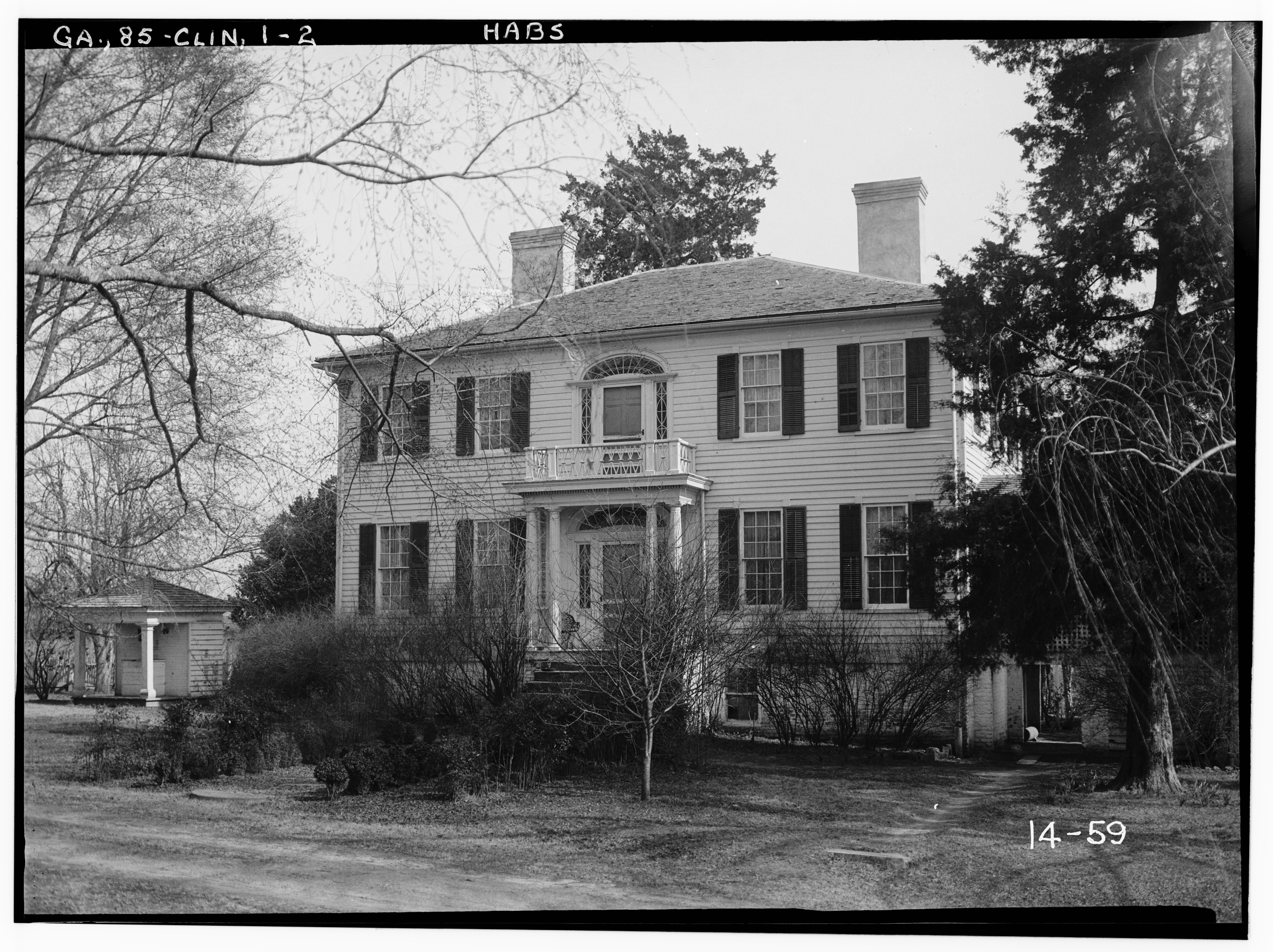
- Lowther Hall in 1934

- Location within Georgia Location within the United States
- Coordinates: 32°59′55″N 83°33′20″W
- Country: United States
- State: Georgia
- County: Jones
- Elevation: 548 ft (167 m)
- Time zone: UTC-5 (Eastern (EST))
  - Summer (DST): UTC-4 (EDT)
- Area code: 478
- GNIS feature ID: 355194

Clinton is an unincorporated town in Jones County, Georgia, United States. Formerly the county seat of Jones County, Clinton is located along Georgia State Route 18 (and the former US 129) only 1 1/2 miles (2.4 km) southwest of the center of Gray. The center of the formerly incorporated town forms the Old Clinton Historic District.

== History ==
Clinton was originally called Albany and served as the first county seat of Jones County, which was formed in December 1807 from Baldwin County.

The town was renamed Clinton for DeWitt Clinton (1769–1828), the seventh and ninth governor of New York, or possibly his uncle George Clinton, vice president of the U.S. from 1805 to 1812. It was established as the county seat by the Georgia General Assembly on December 22, 1808.

The Georgia General Assembly incorporated the "Town of Clinton" in 1816. A post office called Clinton was established in 1821, and remained in operation until 1924.

In the early and middle 1800s, Clinton grew as a center of commerce and the cotton trade, and was one of the most populous cities in Georgia. During this period, impressive homes were constructed and the town was visited by the Marquis de Lafayette during his 1825 tour of the U.S. The Clinton Female Seminary, incorporated in 1821 and established in 1828, was the forerunner of what would become Macon’s Wesleyan College in neighboring Bibb County.

Clinton began a period of near-terminal decline first with the destruction of the town in 1864 at the hands of the invading Northern armies of William T. Sherman in the American Civil War. This was compounded when the Central of Georgia Railway bypassed Clinton in favor of nearby Gray due to local opposition.

The county seat of Jones county was moved to Gray in 1905, and Clinton's municipal charter was officially dissolved in 1995 along with those of many other inactive Georgia municipalities.

Today, the nucleus of the original residential portion town forms the Old Clinton Historic District (listed in 1974). The town's former business district no longer exists.

== Geography ==
Outside of Old Clinton, the town functions much like a suburb of Gray, especially along the four-lane divided Gray Highway (formerly US 129, which now bypasses Clinton and Gray). Small parcels of Clinton along Gray Highway have been formally annexed to Gray.

== Culture ==
Since the late 20th century, the Old Clinton Historic District has been the site of War Days, an event reenacting 19th century life, including the Jones County Civil War battles of Sunshine Church and Griswoldville.

== Notable people ==
- Ellen Craft – abolitionist leader
- John T. Edge - author, former director of the Southern Foodways Alliance, and host of the SEC Network's show TrueSouth
- Brigadier General Alfred Iverson Jr. (February 14, 1829 – May 2, 1911) was a Confederate infantry and cavalry officer during the American Civil War. Born in Clinton, Georgia, he served in both the Mexican–American War and the United States Army before resigning his commission to join the Confederate States Army. He is best known for the disastrous destruction of his brigade on the first day of the Battle of Gettysburg and his subsequent redemption during the Atlanta Campaign, where he successfully captured Union Major General George Stoneman.
