= Barbara Haber =

Culinary historian

Barbara Haber is a culinary historian and speaker. She is the former book curator of the Schlesinger Library at Harvard University. Haber is credited with expanding the library's focus on women's social history to include food-related books and cookbooks, as well as fiction and memoirs, despite critics that were originally against it. She has authored and co-written books on subjects related to culinary history.

== Life and career ==
Haber was born and raised in Milwaukee.

In 1968, she began a part-time job at a then-small women's history library, the Schlesinger Library. For over 30 years, Haber curated books and organized events at the Schlesinger Library on the History of Women in America at Harvard University. During her time at Schlesinger, she expanded the library's collection from 8,000 to about 80,000 books—16,000 of which were food-related books or cookbooks.

Her addition of cookbooks to the library was initially controversial. The debate on whether cookbooks should have a substantial role in the library's collection started in 1943, and up until the late 1980s, the library generally did not allow the purchase of cookbooks. Critics were concerned about adding cookbooks to a feminist library. Speaking about the controversy, Haber said, "For some reason, cooking, more than any other household chore… was the symbol of the patriarchy." In the early 1990s, culinary history was not seriously considered as an academic subject. During that time, however, Haber was a supporter of creating academic studies on the role of food in culture and establishing more formal degrees on subjects like "Culinary History".

In 1989, Julia Child added to the library's collection, donating 500 rare cookbooks from the American Institute of Wine and Food. In 1997, the James Beard Foundation honored Haber with a Who's Who of Food and Beverage in America award.

Her 2002 book, Hardtack to Home Fries: An Uncommon History of American Cooks and Meals, drew on materials in the Schlesinger Library to explore a range of culinary history topics, including its connection to society, politics, and economics. Haber retired from the Schlesinger Library in 2003 to pursue writing full-time.

With Arlene Voski Avakian, Haber co-authored From Betty Crocker to Feminist Food Studies, a culinary history book published in 2005. In 2005, Haber joined the James Beard Foundation awards board of governors. She later became a Committee Chair of the Who's Who of Food and Beverage in America.

== Works ==
- Women in America: A Guide to Books, 1963-1975 (1981) ISBN 025200826X
- Hardtack to Homefries: An Uncommon History of American Cooks and Meals (2002) - ISBN 1439137595
- From Betty Crocker to Feminist Food Studies (2005, with Arlene Voski Avakian) ISBN 1558495118
