= Arlene Voski Avakian =

Armenian-American academic

- Born: 1939
- Education: University of Massachusetts Amherst
- Occupations: Women's studies; food history

Arlene Voski Avakian (born 1939) is an Armenian-American academic specializing in women's studies and food history.

Avakian came to the University of Massachusetts Amherst as a graduate student, helping to found the Women's Studies Program. She later joined the faculty at what grew into the university's Department of Women, Gender, and Sexuality Studies. She retired from UMass Amherst in 2011.

Avakian's papers are held in the university's archives collection.

== Life ==
Avakian was born in New York to Iranian Armenian and Turkish Armenian parents in 1939. Some of her experiences as child and young adult led her to her work in feminism. Due to the conservative nature of her childhood, Avakian married in order to distance herself from her family. She and her husband had two children together; one of her children, Neal, was on the autism spectrum, which was one of the factors that led her to her career path. Avakian’s marriage ended, and she eventually identified herself as a lesbian when she was 34. Her relationship with partner Martha Ayres lasted for 42 years.

Avakian’s Armenian-American and LGBTQ identities made a recognizable impact on her areas of academic specialty, and she acknowledges how her unique identity has allowed her to contribute a valuable perspective to academia. Avakian notes there are very few people who “identify as both Armenian and LGBTQ,” so her contributions to academia serve as representation for people who share Avakian’s complex identity.

== Education ==
Avakian originally attended Alfred University before transferring to Columbia University. During her time at Columbia University, she became “involved in women’s studies.” She received a Bachelor of Science degree in Art History from Columbia University in 1961.

After a notable gap in her academic journey, she received her Master of Arts in American History-Social History of American Women from University of Massachusetts Amherst in 1975. While she was obtaining her Master of Arts student at University of Massachusetts Amherst, Avakian tailored her academic experience to “focus on the construction of identity, primarily regarding the interactions of components such as gender, race, ethnicity, and nationality.”

One of the most notable elements of Avakian’s contributions while receiving her education was her role in helping to “co-found the new program in Women's Studies at UMass Amherst.” Her contributions were vital to the program's success, as she focused on incorporating diverse perspectives beyond traditional white feminism.

Avakian completed her EdD at University of Massachusetts Amherst in 1985, with her dissertation, "Culture and Feminist Theory: An Armenian American Women's Perspective." Her dissertation was a memoir, which she acknowledges as a reflection of the non-traditional nature of her academic journey.

Avakian notes the civil rights movement as one of the inspirations that led her to tailor her educational interests. In her words, “It meant so much to me to see people who were oppressed standing up for themselves." Avakian’s rebellious spirit as a young person stemmed from her experiences of restrictive gender roles that impacted the trajectory of education, and eventually her career.

Another element that Avakian says jumpstarted her re-entry into education and helped her find her academic specialty was the feminist movement, which she discovered by “reading about it,” when she was 24 years old. Avakian was married to her husband at the time, and learning about the feminist movement caused her to reflect on her experiences. As she states, “…I was a wife and mother and the women's movement said, you don't have to be this. You can be something else. The women's movement basically said, your life is not over.”

The political elements of her education were also inspired by her experiences caring for her autistic son Neal. Avakian has explained that caring for her son’s unique needs “gave [her] another view on the world and how it was for people who are not in the mainstream.” Overall, Avakian’s educational focus upon her re-entry into education were inspired by her exposure to the civil rights movement, the feminist movement, and her son’s experiences as an autistic individual.

== Career and research interests ==
Avakian served a highly regarded Associate Professor at University of Massachusetts Amherst from 1993 to 2001. In 2001, she became a Professor as well as the Chair of the Women, Gender, and Sexuality Studies department at University of Massachusetts Amherst. She remained in these positions until she retired in 2011.

Apart from her contribution to the “nationally-recognized Department of Women, Gender, and Sexuality Studies” at University of Massachusetts Amherst, Avakian has contributed to scholarship relating to the causes closest to her heart, which she identified at various stages throughout her life. Her contributions to academia have been significant, and she has used her unique perspective and identity to inform her scholarship "on topics ranging from the lives and experiences of Armenian American and African American women to culinary history and the construction of whiteness.”

One of Avakian’s most notable contributions to academia is that she is one of the figures that “helped shape the concept of women's studies as a legitimate field.” In addition to helping shape the field of women’s studies, Avakian notes the role of both Black studies as being integral to the trajectory of her academic career. Her focus in the development of women’s studies as a department was to create a field that centralizes matters of race in the study of gender. In Avakian’s own words, “Now, race is in the center of that department, alongside of gender. It's not displacing gender, it's enriching it.”

== Works ==
- Lion woman's legacy: an Armenian-American memoir, New York: Feminist Press at the City University of New York, 1992
- (ed.) Through the kitchen window: women explore the intimate meanings of food and cooking, Boston: Beacon Press, 1997
- (with Barbara Haber) From Betty Crocker to feminist food studies: critical perspectives on women and food, Amherst: University of Massachusetts Press, 2005
