= Abraham Chasanow =

United States government employee (1910-1989)

Abraham Chasanow (December 1, 1910 – June 11, 1989) was a United States government employee who was suspended from employment in July 1953, during the McCarthy era, on the grounds that he was a security risk. He was later reinstated.

== Career in government ==
Chasanow was born on December 1, 1910, and attended what later became American University Washington College of Law.

Chasanow was employed by the U.S. Navy's Hydrographic Office for 23 years when suspended without pay on July 29, 1953, and charged as a security risk. Unidentified informants had accused him of having left-wing associations. He was removed from government employment on April 7, 1954. At the time, he lived in Greenbelt, Maryland, where he had been head of the Citizens' Association and a director of the Lions Club.

The charges against him included:

- associating with people "suspected of having Communistic tendencies"
- attending a party where funds were raised for Victims of the Spanish Civil War
- being, according to "[s]everal reliable informants", "a leader and very active in a radical group in Greenbelt, Md." that included "those described as ever willing to defend Communism."

He was first exonerated by the unanimous decision of a security board and then that judgment was set aside. He appealed and followed the advice of his attorney, Joseph A. Fanelli, to make his case public. The Navy announced on May 4, 1954, that a special hearing board would review his case. That board reversed his dismissal.

On September 1, 1954, Assistant Secretary of the Navy James H. Smith, Jr. issued a formal apology to Chasanow and described the accusations against him as "a grave injustice." Smith said the informants did "a disservice to the security procedures of the nation" and announced that the Navy was modifying its security procedures in response to Chasanow's case. To reestablish Chasanow's reputation, Smith detailed the findings of the special hearing board that found Chasanow an "above average loyal American citizen" and praised his "exemplary family life", civic participation, and "active religious life". The board found that Chasanow's contacts with others suspected of disloyalty predated their identification as subversives and had been "short or casual". Chasanow commented: "All I can say is that it seems like I woke up from a bad dream and the sun was shining." He was awarded back pay. The American Jewish Congress praised Smith's action, but asked for an investigation of the role of antisemitism in the charges against Chasanow. It said in a letter to Charles S. Thomas, Secretary of the Navy, that "under the present loyalty program there is far too much room for action based on suspicion, arbitrary conjecture and secrecy." Time magazine called Smith's statement "a handsome apology".

Chasanow testified in 1955 when his and several other security cases were reviewed in hearings before a Senate subcommittee investigating abuses in the government security program. He proposed reforms that included the punishment of those who made false accusations and legal aid for those accused. His case continued to be cited as Democrats criticized the Eisenhower Administration's management of security reviews.

Investigative reporter Anthony Lewis won the 1954 Heywood Broun Award of the American Newspaper Guild for a series of articles describing the Chasanow case. He won the Pulitzer Prize for National Reporting in 1955 for the same series. The articles were credited with helping Chasanow win the Navy review that exonerated him.

In 1956, the Anti-Defamation League of B'nai B'rith sponsored the publication of a study of antisemitism in the United States, Cross-Currents in America, that used the security investigation of Chasanow as a principal example.

A management study later proposed the elimination of Chasanow's position. He agreed with the study and resigned from his post as director of the distribution control office of the Hydrographic Office.

His case was also the subject of a 1957 movie Three Brave Men starring Ray Milland and Ernest Borgnine. Bosley Crowther in The New York Times called it a "plainly pussyfooting picture" in which "the obvious point of the real-life drama is avoided and an imaginary target is devised." The film assigned blame to a vague personal enemy and local gossips while the role of those responsible for the investigation was "sweetly glossed". Chasanow's name in the film is Bernie Goldsmith. Chasanow served as an adviser on the film.

== Later life ==
After leaving government service, Chasanow practiced law and worked as a real estate broker until retiring in the 1970s.

He died of an aneurysm on June 11, 1989, while vacationing in Atlantic City. Anthony Lewis eulogized him:

Abraham Chasanow died the other day, and attention should be paid. He was not a famous person; he disliked the limelight. But when he was victimized at a time of fear and injustice in this country, he fought back. He made a difference.
Abe Chasanow was a victim of the Federal loyalty-security program that terrorized Government employees in the 1950s. He was a ludicrously unlikely victim: a middle-class man, uninterested in politics, without a radical bone in his body. That was what made his case, and his stubborn heroism, so significant.

Abraham was married to Helen Chasanow, who also worked as a real-estate agent. Their second child Phyllis C. Richman (née Chasanow) became an influential writer who served as the food critic for The Washington Post for 23 years.

== Sources ==
- Broadwater, Jeff (1992). Eisenhower & the Anti-Communist Crusade. Chapel Hill: University of North Carolina Press. ISBN 0-8078-2015-6.
- Shrecker, Ellen (1998). Many Are the Crimes: McCarthyism in America. Boston: Little, Brown and Company. ISBN 0-316-77470-7.
