= Lally Brennan =

- Born: Claire Lally Brennan; 1953 (age 72–73)
- Occupation: Restaurateur
- Known for: Co-proprietor of Commander's Palace
- Relatives: Ella Brennan

Lally Brennan is an American restaurateur. She is co-proprietor of Commander's Palace with her cousin, Ti Adelaide Martin. In 2018 Brennan and Martin were named to the James Beard Foundation's Who's Who in Food & Beverage in America.

== Early life and education ==
Claire Lally Brennan was born in 1953 to John Brennan and Claire Lally Brennan. She attended Southern Methodist University where she studied art history. She married and lived in Memphis before divorcing and moving back to New Orleans, where she worked occasionally in the family restaurants, eventually ending up at Commander's Palace.

== Restaurants ==
Brennan is co-proprietor of Commander's Palace with her cousin, Ti Adelaide Martin. The pair ran day-to-day operations for Martin's mother, Ella Brennan, before taking over proprietorship from her in 1997.

Brennan and Martin opened another restaurant, Cafe Adelaide, in 2003.

== Recognition ==
In 2018 Brennan and Martin were named to the James Beard Foundation's Who's Who in Food & Beverage. In 2019 Brennan and Martin were named to Nation's Restaurant News Power List. In 2020 Biz New Orleans named them Executives of the Year for their handling of the COVID-19 pandemic closures.

== Books ==
- In the Land of Cocktails: Recipes and Adventures from the Cocktail Chicks. HarperCollins Publishers. 2007. ISBN 978-0-06-187754-4. with Ti Martin
- Miss Ella of Commander's Palace. Gibbs Smith. 2016. ISBN 978-1423642558. with Ti Martin
