= Joe Dabney =

American author

Joe Dabney (January 29, 1929 – December 26, 2015) was an American author. He received the 2005 Lifetime Achievement Award from the Southern Foodways Alliance and his Smokehouse Ham, Spoon Bread & Scuppernong Wine won the James Beard Cookbook of the Year award in 1999. He also authored Mountain Spirits about American moonshine. He used oral histories and historical research.

== Bibliography ==
- Mountain spirits: a chronicle of corn whiskey from King James' Ulster plantation to America's Appalachians and the moonshine life (1974)
- HERK: hero of the skies (1979)
- More mountain spirits: the continuing chronicle of moonshine life and corn whiskey, wines, ciders & beers in America's Appalachians (1985)
- Smokehouse ham, spoon bread & scuppernong wine: the folklore and art of Southern Appalachian cooking (1998)
- The Food, folklore, and art of lowcountry cooking: a Celebration of the foods, history, and romance handed down from England, Africa, the Caribbean, France, Germany, and Scotland (2010)
