= Old Clinton Historic District =

Historic district in Georgia, United States

- U.S. National Register of Historic Places
- U.S. Historic district
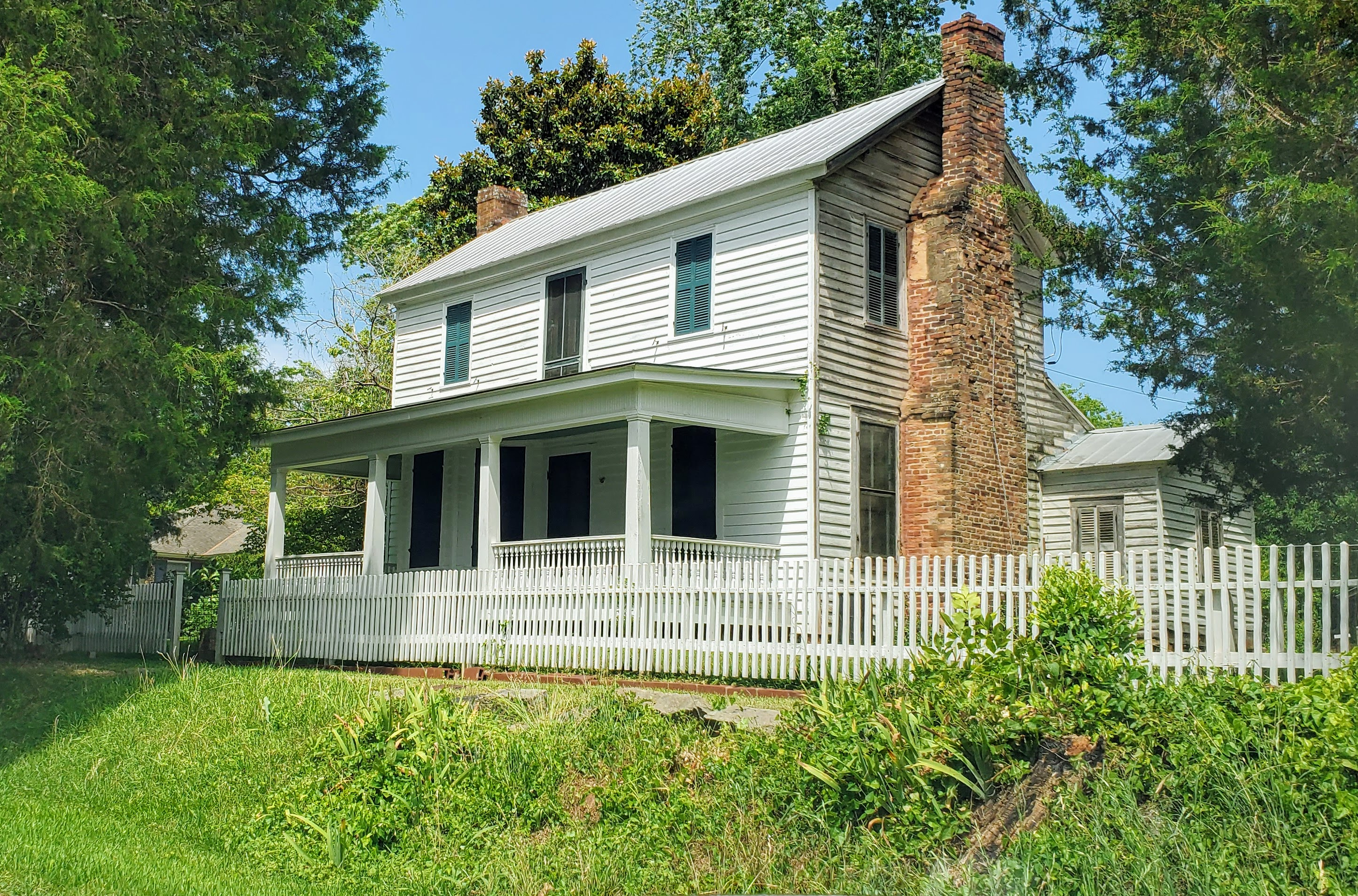
- Hutchings-Carr House located on Pulaski Street

- Location within Georgia Location within the United States
- Location: Runs along US 129 and SR 11, Clinton, Georgia
- Coordinates: 32°59′48″N 83°33′32″W
- Area: 290 acres (1.2 km^{2})
- Architect: Pratt, Daniel; Et al.
- Architectural style: Georgian
- NRHP reference No.: 74000690
- Added to NRHP: September 12, 1974

The Old Clinton Historic District, also known as Old Clinton, is a 290 acres (1.2 km^{2}) historic district in Clinton, Georgia which was listed on the National Register of Historic Places in 1974.

It then included 11 contributing buildings and it included Georgian Revival architecture.

Amongst its notable buildings are:

- Glower-Gaultney House (c.1816-19), on Madison Street, a two-story frame house (see photo #14 with NRHP nomination)
- Parrish-Hutchings-Johnson, on Madison Street, a two-story frame house which once served as a boardinghouse
- Mitchell-Smith-Bowen-Blair House (during 1810s), also known as the Judge Bowen House.

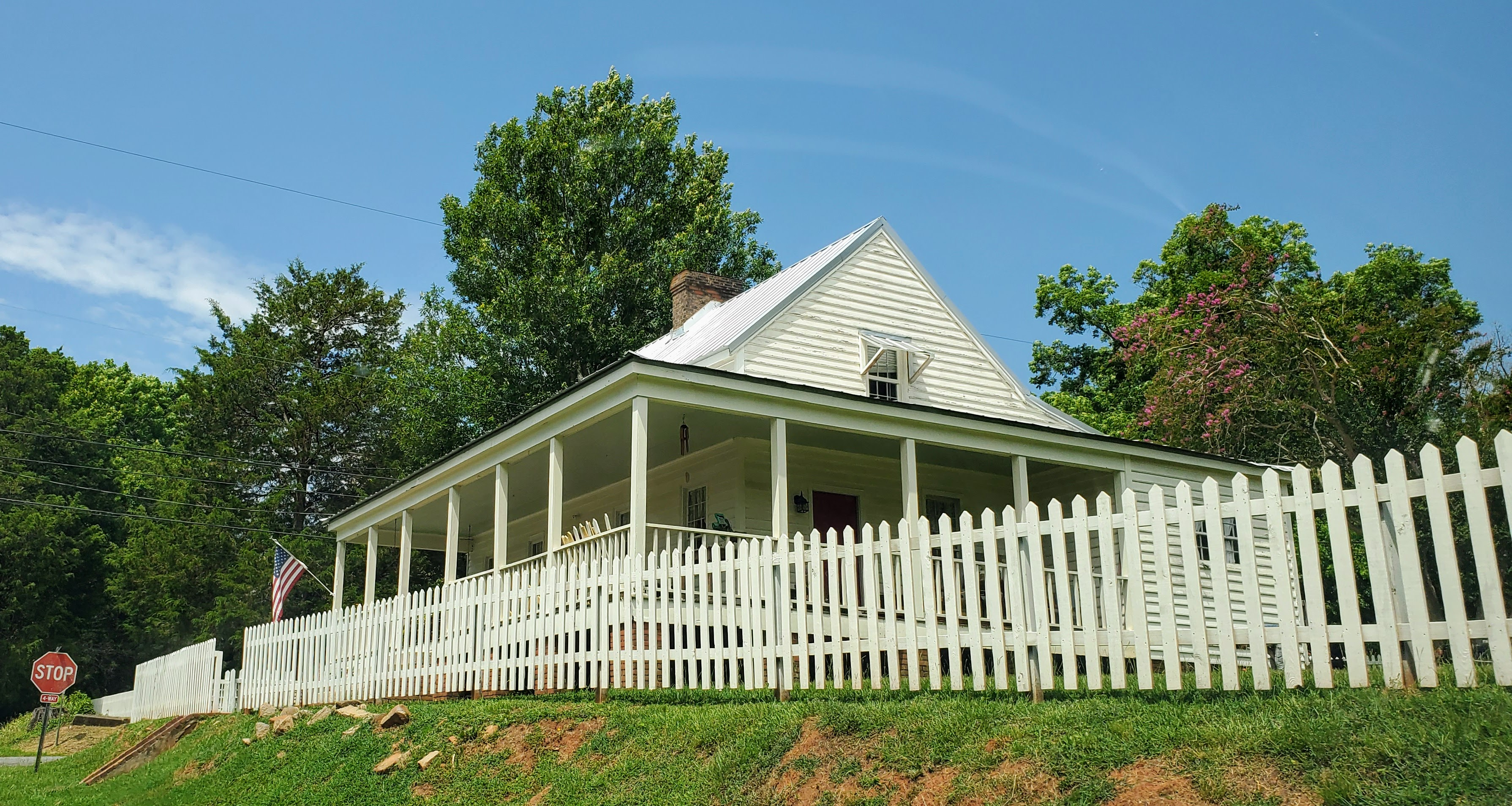
Milling-Hutchings-Kingman House at the corner of Pulaski and Randolph Streets

It includes the old courthouse square, site of former two-story brick Jones County Courthouse (1818), which was demolished in the 1920s or 1930s.

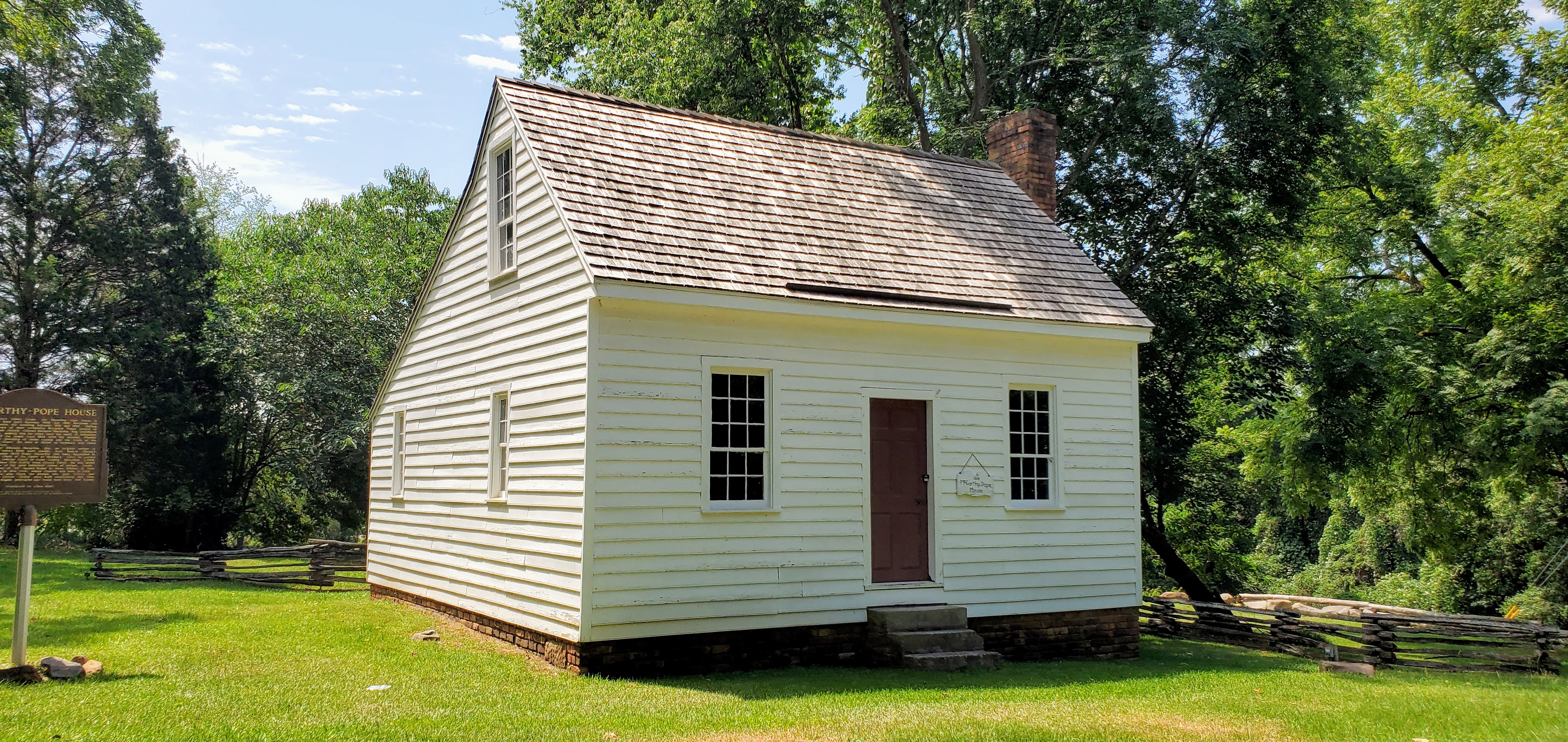
McCarthy-Pope House in the Old Clinton Historic District
