= Nick Malgieri =

American pastry chef and author

Nick Malgieri is an American pastry chef and author.

His book Dough: Simple Contemporary Bread by Nick Malgieri was the recipient of the 2006 James Beard award in the Baking and Desserts category.

He was the first chef to teach a workshop at the James Beard Foundation headquarters.

He is a former teacher at the Institute of Culinary Education.

== Early life and education ==
Malgieri went to Seton Hall University and the Culinary Institute of America.

== Books ==
- Nick Malgieri's Bread
- How to Bake: The Complete Guide to Perfect Cakes, Cookies, Pies, Tarts, Breads, Pizzas, Muffins, Sweet and Savory (revised 2018)
- Nick Malgieri's Pastry
- BAKE!: Essential Techniques for Perfect Baking
- The Modern Baker: Time-Saving Techniques for Breads, Tarts, Pies, Cakes and Cookies
- Perfect Light Desserts
- A Baker's Tour: Nick Malgieri's Favorite Baking Recipes from Around the World
- Perfect Cakes
- Cookies Unlimited
- Nick Malgieri's Perfect Pastry: Create Fantastic Desserts by Mastering the Basic Techniques
- Chocolate: From Simple Cookies to Extravagant Showstoppers
- How to Bake: The Complete Guide to Perfect Cakes, Cookies, Pies, Tarts, Breads, Pizzas, Muffins, Sweet and Savory
- Great Italian Desserts
