= Monte Bove =

Mountain in central Italy

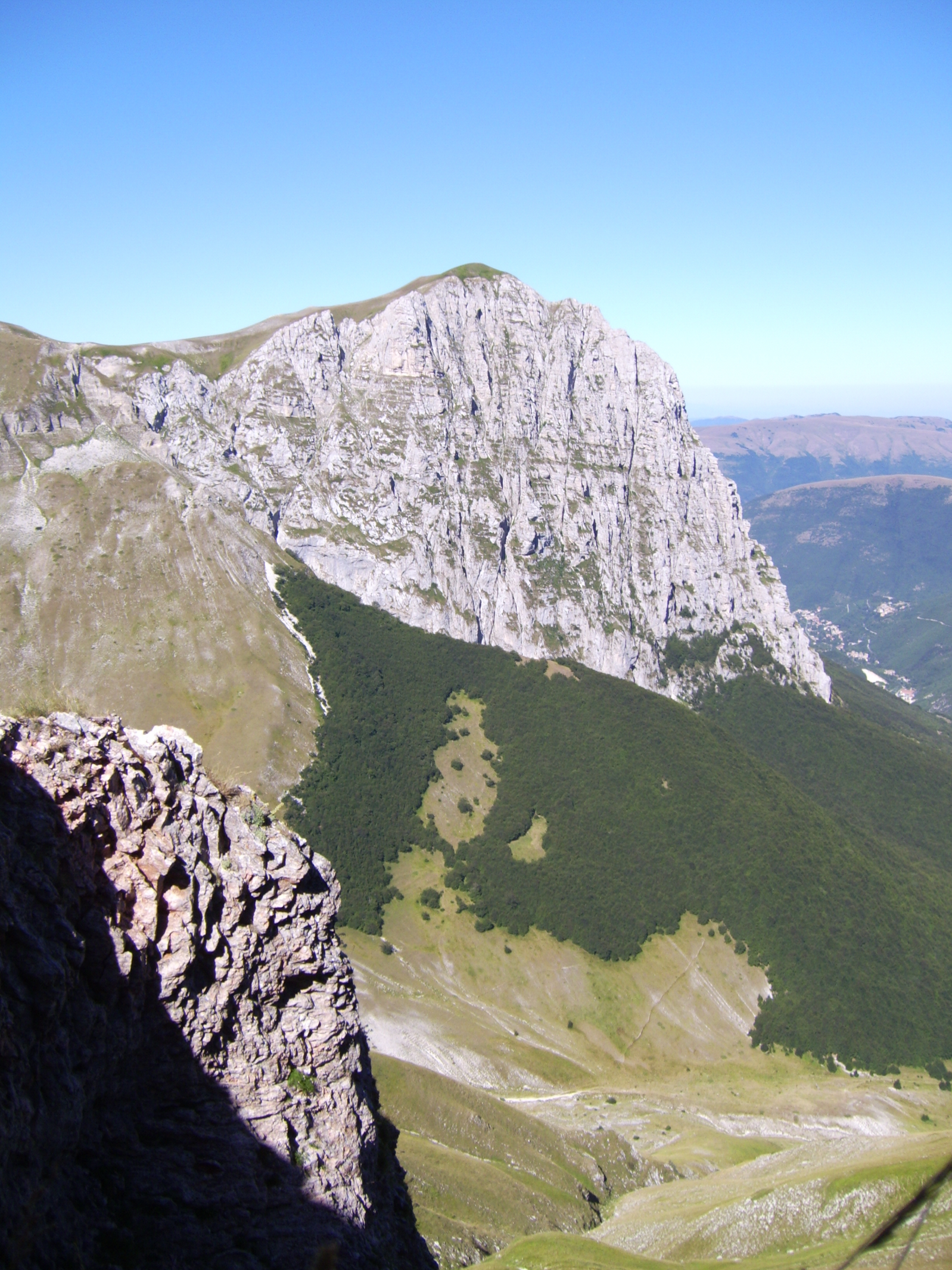

Highest point
- Elevation: 2,169 m (7,116 ft)
- Prominence: 269 m (883 ft)
- Coordinates: 42°56′10″N 13°11′25″E

Geography
- Location within Italy
- Location: Macerata, Italy
- Parent range: Monti Sibillini

Monte Bove is a mountain in the Monti Sibillini range of the Apennines, Marche, central Italy. It has an elevation of 2169 metres.

It is limited from north by the Ussita stream and from south by the Vallinfante valley. Then northern and eastern slopes are characterized by wide rock cliffs of dolomitic limestone.
