= Three Brave Men =

1956 film by Philip Dunne

- Theatrical release poster
- Directed by: Philip Dunne
- Written by: Philip Dunne
- Based on: articles by Anthony Lewis
- Produced by: Herbert Bayard Swope
- Starring: Ray Milland; Ernest Borgnine; Frank Lovejoy
- Cinematography: Charles G. Clarke
- Edited by: David Bretherton
- Music by: Hans J. Salter
- Production company: 20th Century Fox
- Distributed by: 20th Century Fox
- Release date: December 1956
- Running time: 88 minutes
- Country: United States
- Language: English
- Budget: $1,050,000

Three Brave Men is a 1956 American drama film directed by Philip Dunne and starring Ray Milland, Ernest Borgnine and Frank Lovejoy.

The film was based on real-life events arising in Greenbelt, Maryland, the investigation of Abraham Chasanow, a U.S. government employee, as a security risk in 1954–55. Bosley Crowther in The New York Times called the film a "plainly pussyfooting picture" in which "the obvious point of the real-life drama is avoided and an imaginary target is devised." The film assigned blame to a vague personal enemy and local gossips while the role of those responsible for the investigation, in his view, was "sweetly glossed". Chasanow's name in the film is Bernie Goldsmith. Chasanow served as an adviser on the film.

== Plot ==
Communist conspiracies seem to be everywhere in the 1950s, particularly in Washington, D.C., where word has reached John Rogers, the Secretary of the Navy, that one of his subordinates is strongly suspected to be a Communist sympathizer.

Bernie Goldsmith has no idea that he is the man in question as he enjoys his daughter's school essay on patriotism. The news that he is being suspended from work and investigated comes as a complete shock to him.

Friends and neighbors, including a Protestant minister and a Catholic neighbor, rally to Bernie's side after others begin to shun him. Joe DiMarco agrees to represent him in court, where a female lieutenant, Mary Jane McCoy, paints a suspicious picture of Bernie in the Navy's eyes. Others recant their original testimony against Bernie. Some witnesses discredit themselves when they issue antisemitic tirades about Jewish control of industry or a Jewish-Communist conspiracy. Joe's diligent work results in conclusive testimony that Bernie is not a Communist and all charges against him are dismissed.

A grateful Bernie can not wait to be reinstated at work. Secretary Rogers, however, has stubbornly decided that he still cannot trust him. Months go by, with Bernie unable to find gainful employment. Those who believe in Bernie go to great lengths again to get the Secretary to apologize and restore the innocent man's good name.

== Cast ==
- Ray Milland as Joe DiMarco
- Ernest Borgnine as Bernard F. "Bernie" Goldsmith
- Frank Lovejoy as Capt. Amos Winfield U.S.N.
- Nina Foch as Lt. Mary Jane McCoy
- Dean Jagger as John W. Rogers, Secretary of the Navy
- Virginia Christine as Helen Goldsmith
- Edward Andrews as Mayor Henry L. Jensen
- Frank Faylen as Enos Warren
- Diane Jergens as Shirley Goldsmith
- Warren Berlinger as Harry Goldsmith
- Andrew Duggan as Pastor Stephen Browing
- Joseph Wiseman as Jim Barron
- James Westerfield as Chief of Police Timothy Aloysius O'Reilly
- Richard Anderson as Naval It. Bill Horton
- Olive Blakeney as Miss Victoria Scott
- Jason Wingreen as Perry
- Robert Burton as W. L. Dietz

== Production ==
The film was originally called The Chasanow Story and was announced in March 1956. It was based on a series of articles by Anthony Lewis. The producer was Herbert Swope and the writer director was Phillip Dunne, who had just collaborated on Hilda Crane.

The title was eventually changed to Three Brave Men, based on the title of a newspaper editorial after Chasanow had been reinstated. Producer Swope wanted Ernest Borgnine to play Chasanow and Alan Ladd to play his attorney. Eventually the leads were played by Borgnine and Ray Milland. Filming began in September.

Borgnine was loaned out by Hecht Hill Lancaster. He later sued that company for money owing him on the fees he (and they) earned on The Catered Affair, The Best Things in Life Are Free and Three Brave Men.

=== Script ===
In July 1956, Twentieth-Century Fox submitted to the U.S. Navy a copy of the screenplay for review as a general cooperative "voluntary censorship" act routinely practiced at the time when a film involved the U.S. military.

The acting Secretary of the Navy, Thomas S. Gates, Jr., found it misleading and at his request Dunne produced a revised version making it clear, in the Navy's words, that "the Chasanow case was far from being a typical case and that under current procedures it could not happen again." He also removed direct references to antisemitism as a motivation for the proceedings against Chasanow. Another draft was required to identify international Communism as the threat that required rigorous security procedures.

In his autobiography, Dunne regretted that he did not make the film he first imagined, "a Kafkaesque tale of the denial of human rights," "a story (the true one) of unseen terror, of a man fighting in the dark against unseen enemies," unable to draw upon his constitutional rights to defend himself. The point of view, he wrote, became that of the Navy and its crusade to maintain security, making only a rare mistake. The film's closing words delivered by a Navy official whitewashed the Navy's responsibility for Chasanow's persecution: "A free country learns from its mistakes. I offer you the Navy's apology for the grave injustice you've suffered."

== Sources ==
- Robb, David L. (2004). Operation Hollywood: How the Pentagon Shapes and Censors the Movie. Amherst, NY: Prometheus Books. ISBN 1-59102-182-0.
