= Frank Stitt =

American chef and restaurateur

Frank Stitt III is the owner and executive chef of Highlands Bar and Grill, Bottega Restaurant, Bottega Cafe, and Chez Fon Fon in Birmingham, Alabama.

Stitt learned about food in California at Alice Waters' Chez Panisse, and later in France. In 1982 he opened Highlands Bar and Grill, an in 1988 opened Bottega Restaurant, which served Italian fare. He has since opened a number of restaurants. Over his career, Stitt has written cookbooks and engaged in advocacy for using local food.

== Early life and education ==
Stitt was born in 1954, grew up in Cullman, Alabama, and graduated high school in 1972. He began his studies at Tufts University in Medford, Massachusetts, then transferred to the University of California, Berkeley, as a philosophy major. It was through philosophical treatises on food by authors such as Richard Olney and Elizabeth David that he developed an interest in cooking. After graduation, he spent time in Europe. He tried unsuccessfully to apprentice himself to area chefs, until Fritz Luenberger brought him on at his Casablanca restaurant.

== Career ==
Stitt worked in the kitchen at Alice Waters' Chez Panisse. There he was introduced to Olney, who was living in Provence and compiling a multi-volume Time–Life series on cooking. While there, he met other notable chefs and food writers such as Julia Child, Jeremiah Tower, and Simone Beck. He also took more menial jobs, such as grape harvesting, that would allow him to learn more about foods.

After leaving France, Stitt worked in the Caribbean for a while before returning to Alabama. He took a job as a sommelier at a wine shop and as a chef for the Hyatt House Hotel while teaching cooking classes privately. He was unable to persuade local banks to lend him money to start his own restaurant, so he turned to friends and family for assistance. His mother re-mortgaged her house to help out, and Highlands Bar and Grill opened in November 1982.

In 1988, Stitt opened Bottega Restaurant near Highlands Bar and Grill, borrowing Italian cooking traditions as its staple. Both restaurants spawned more casual sibling establishments, Bottega Cafe adjoining Bottega, and Chez Fonfon next door to Highlands. Stitt's kitchens have directly influenced local culinary professionals, such as Chris Hastings, owner of Hot and Hot Fish Club. Stitt's activism on behalf of locally grown farm products contributed to the area's local food movement.

His first cookbook, Frank Stitt's Southern Table, was a bestseller and was named "Best Cookbook" for 2005 by the Southern Booksellers Association.

== Awards ==
Stitt III was inducted into the James Beard Foundation's "Who's Who of Food and Beverage" in 2011. The foundation also named him the "Best Chef in the Southeast" in 2001 and he was a 2008 finalist for its national "Outstanding Chef" award. Highlands Bar and Grill was selected the winner of its "Outstanding Restaurant" award in 2018. The restaurant's pastry chef, Dolester Miles, was the winner of its "Outstanding Pastry Chef" award in 2018.

Stitt received a Lifetime Achievement Award from the Southern Foodways Alliance for his elevation of Southern cuisine and his advocacy for locally grown food.

== Publications ==
- Stitt, Frank. (2004) Frank Stitt's Southern Table: Recipes and Gracious Traditions from Highlands Bar and Grill. New York: Artisan Books. ISBN 1579652468
- Stitt, Frank (2008) Frank Stitt's Bottega Favorita: A Southern Chef's Love Affair with Italian Food. New York: Artisan Books. ISBN 1579653022
