= Arcugnano =

Arcugnano Arcugnan (Venetian)
- Comune
- Comune di Arcugnano
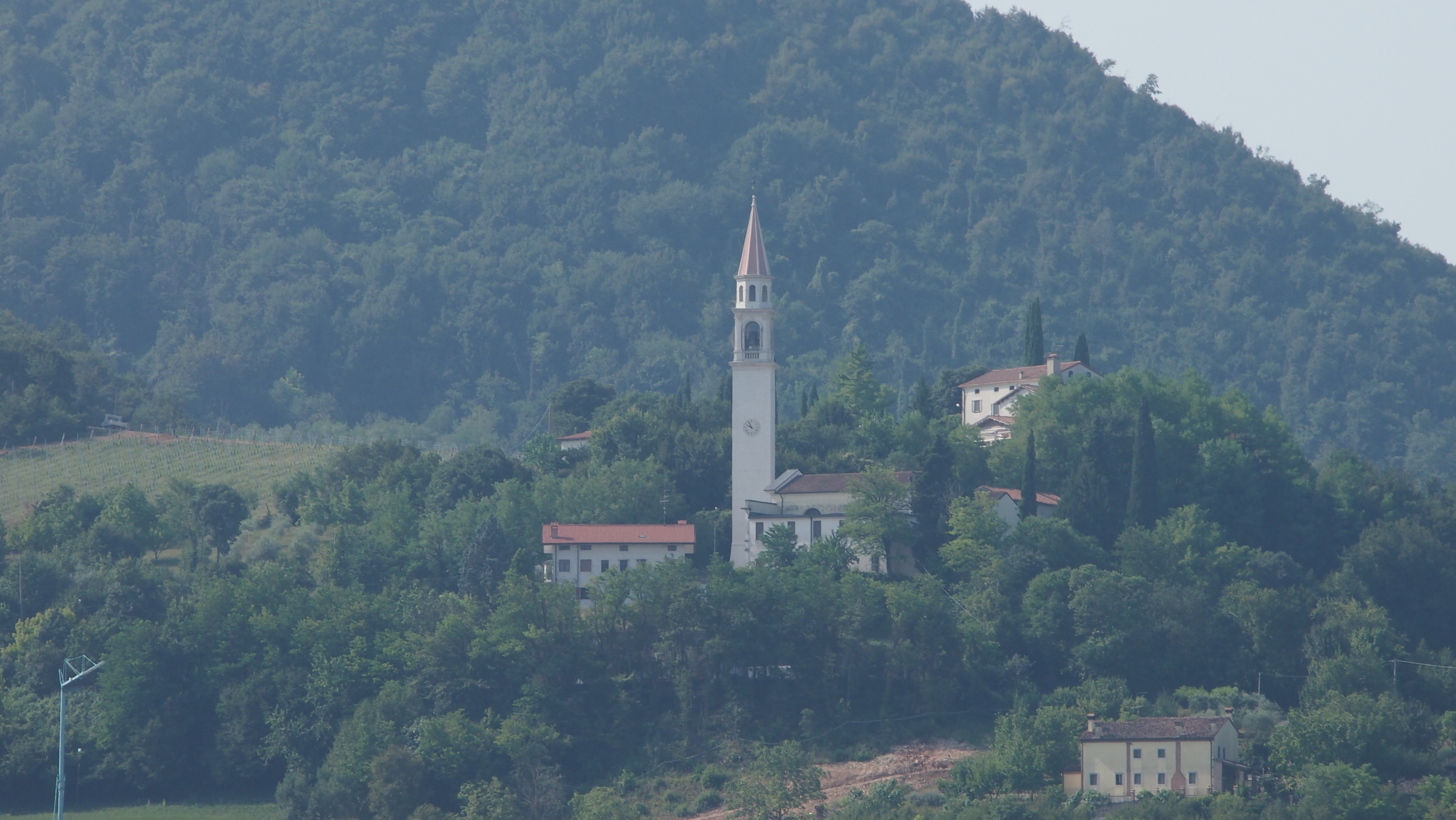
- View of Arcugnano

- Location within Italy Location within Veneto
- Coordinates: 45°30′N 11°32′E
- Country: Italy
- Region: Veneto
- Province: Vicenza (VI)
- Frazioni: Arcugnano, Fimon, Lapio, Perarolo, Pianezze, Sant'Agostino, Torri (municipal seat), Villabalzana

Government
  - Mayor: Emanuele Cassaro (prefectural commissioner)

Area
  - Total: 41.57 km^{2} (16.05 sq mi)
- Elevation: 60 m (200 ft)

Population (30 April 2017)
  - Total: 7,837
  - Density: 188.5/km^{2} (488.3/sq mi)
- Demonym: Arcugnanesi
- Time zone: UTC+1 (CET)
  - Summer (DST): UTC+2 (CEST)
- Postal code: 36057
- Dialing code: 0444
- Patron saint: St. Justina
- Website: www.comune.arcugnano.vi.it

Arcugnano (Venetian: Arcugnan) is a town and comune (municipality) in the province of Vicenza, Veneto, north-eastern Italy. It is located south of A4 motorway.

Arcugnano attracted international attention in 2026 for its so called "Monumental Complex of the Porto degli Angeli Maritime Amphitheater" (Italian: Complesso Monumentale dell’Anfiteatro Marittimo Porto degli Angeli), a fake Roman amphitheatre built by a local businessman named Franco Malosso. The site was determined to be falsely portrayed as a genuine archaeological park, and Malosso was found guilty of various fraudulent activities.

Arcugnano is also known for the Angelo Bianco symbol of hope for end of the Corona pandemic erected by an anonymous artist in mid January 2022.

The town is home to the food company Bertagni.
