= John T. Edge =

American food writer (born 1962)

- Born: December 22, 1962 (age 63); Clinton, Georgia
- Education: Master's degree in Southern Studies from the University of Mississippi; MFA in Creative Non-Fiction from Goucher College
- Occupations: Writer, Commentator, and Director of the Southern Foodways Alliance
- Writing career
- Language: English
- Subjects: American food, history of American food
- Notable works: Fried Chicken: An American Story; Apple Pie: An American Story; Southern Belly; The Truck Food Cookbook
- Notable awards: 2012 MFK Fisher Distinguished Writing Award from the James Beard Foundation
- Website: www.johntedge.com

John T. Edge (born December 22, 1962) is a writer, commentator, and from 1999 to 2020 was director of the Southern Foodways Alliance, an institute of the Center for the Study of Southern Culture at the University of Mississippi. He has written several books on Southern food. For 21 years (1999–2020) he contributed to the Oxford American and for three years he contributed to the New York Times. He writes a column for Garden & Gun and has written for, among others, Afar. In 2017, he published The Potlikker Papers, a food history of the modern South.

== Education ==
John T. studied at the University of Georgia. Edge holds a bachelor's degree and a master's degree in Southern Studies from the University of Mississippi and an MFA in Creative Non-Fiction from Goucher College.

== Southern Foodways Alliance ==
In 1999, Edge became the founding director of the Southern Foodways Alliance, an institute of the Center for the Study of Southern Culture at the University of Mississippi. Every October, the Southern Foodways Alliance sponsors a symposium in Oxford, Mississippi, on American southern cuisine. Edge was one of the primary organizers and the master of ceremonies for the many events, which attracted several hundred attendees. The SFA also engages in oral history work, makes films, and stages other events. Edge retired from the SFA in 2021. He now teaches at the University of Mississippi and the University of Georgia and directs the Mississippi Lab at the University of Mississippi.

== Media ==
Edge has authored numerous books detailing how America eats, including, "The Potlikker Papers: A Food History of the Modern South," Fried Chicken: An American Story, Apple Pie: An American Story, Southern Belly, and The Truck Food Cookbook. Edge has been a regular contributor for the weekend edition of NPR's All Things Considered and has appeared on various television shows including CBS Sunday Morning and Iron Chef.

He has won 4 James Beard awards. In 2012, he won the MFK Fisher Distinguished Writing Award from the James Beard Foundation. His work has also been featured in 10 editions of the Best Food Writing Anthology.

In 2013, he guest appeared on an episode of the Travel Channel's Burger Land.

Since 2018 he has hosted the SEC Network / ESPN television show TrueSouth.

== Personal life ==
Edge was born in the rural community of Clinton, in Jones County, Georgia. He lives in Oxford, Mississippi, with his wife, Blair Hobbs, a painter, writer, and teacher. They have one son, Jess.

== Publications ==
- Edge, John T. The Potlikker Papers: A Food History of the Modern South. Penguin Press, 2017. ISBN 978-1594206559
- Edge, John T. The Truck Food Cookbook: 150 Recipes and Ramblings from America's Best Restaurants on Wheels. Workman, 2012. ISBN 978-0761156161
- Edge, John T. and Roahen, Sara, editors. The Southern Foodways Alliance Community Cookbook. UGA Press, 2010. ISBN 978-0820332758
- Edge, John T. Southern Belly: The Ultimate Food Lovers Companion to the American South. 2012. ISBN 978-1565125476.
- Edge, John T. Donuts: An American Passion. Putnam Adult, 2006. ISBN 0-399-15358-6.
- Edge, John T. Hamburgers and Fries: An American Story. Thorndike Press, 2005. ISBN 0-399-15274-1.
- Edge, John T. Fried Chicken: An American Story. Putnam Adult, 2004. ISBN 0-399-15183-4.
- Edge, John T. Apple Pie: An American Story. Putnam Adult, 2004. ISBN 0-399-15215-6.
- Edge, John T. and Hobbs, Blair. Southern Belly: The Ultimate Food Lover's Guide to the South. Hill Street Press, 2002. ISBN 1-892514-65-6.
- Edge, John T. A Gracious Plenty: Recipes and Recollections from the American South. G. P. Putnam's Sons, 1999. ISBN 0-399-14534-6

== See also ==
- Austin Leslie
