= Benton's Smoky Mountain Country Hams =

American producer of cured meats

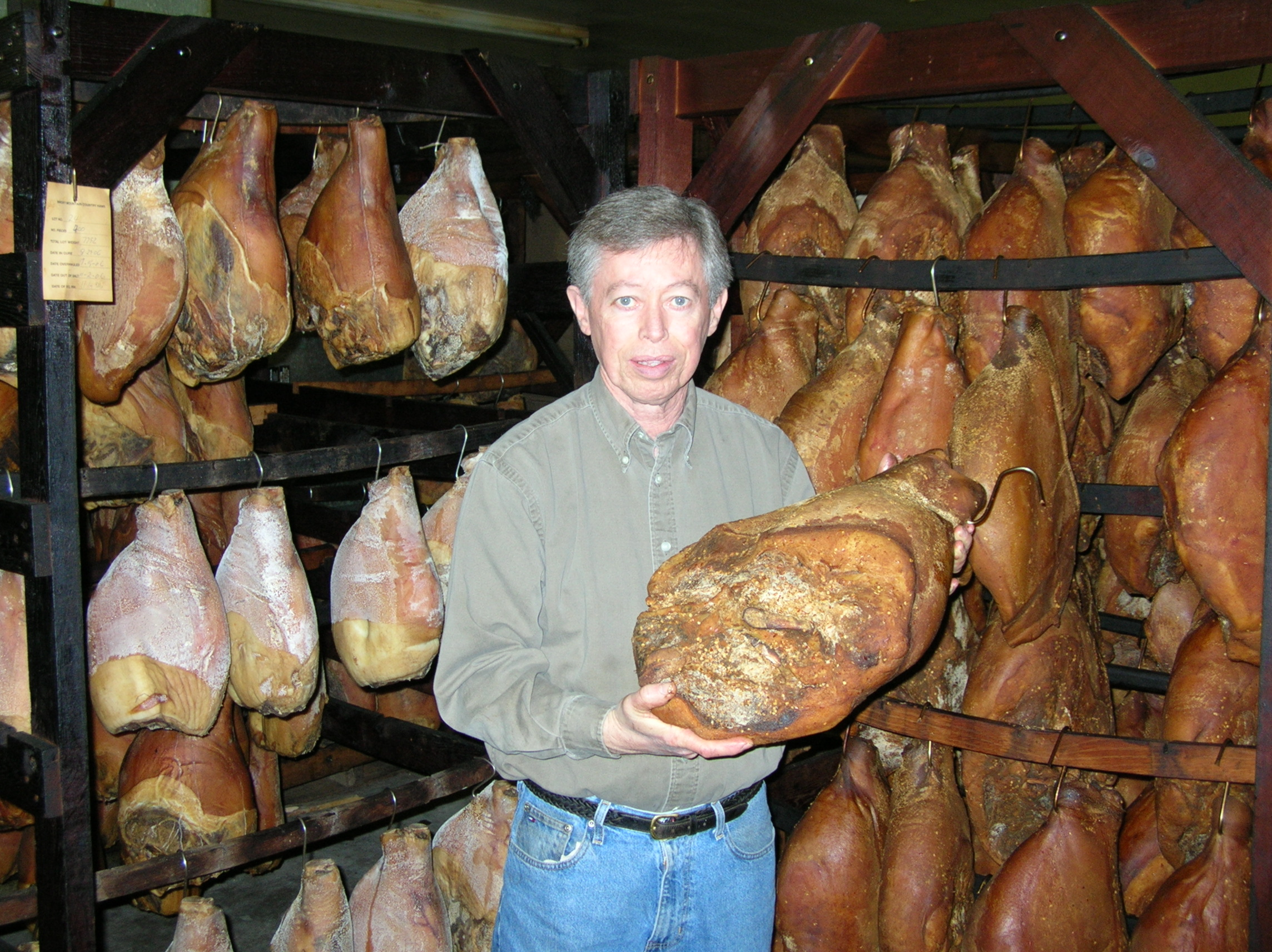
- Allan Benton holding a hickory smoked country ham
- Founded: 1947
- Founder: Albert H. Hicks
- Headquarters: Madisonville, Tennessee
- Products: Cured meats
- Website: bentonscountryhams2.com

Benton's Smoky Mountain Country Hams is a producer of cured meats in Madisonville, Tennessee, United States. The business was started in 1947 by the late Albert H. Hicks.

Allan Benton and his father, B.D. Benton, took over the business in 1973 and it was subsequently renamed and moved to its current location in Madisonville.

== Overview ==
The company uses a slow curing process using salt, brown sugar, and sodium nitrite. The mixture is rubbed onto fresh hams in a maple box; the hams are then aged an average of 9 to 10 months, but often up to 18 months. Many of the hams are also smoked in a small, wood-fired smokehouse that sits behind the shop. Benton's also produces prosciutto, cured bacon, and fresh pork sausage.

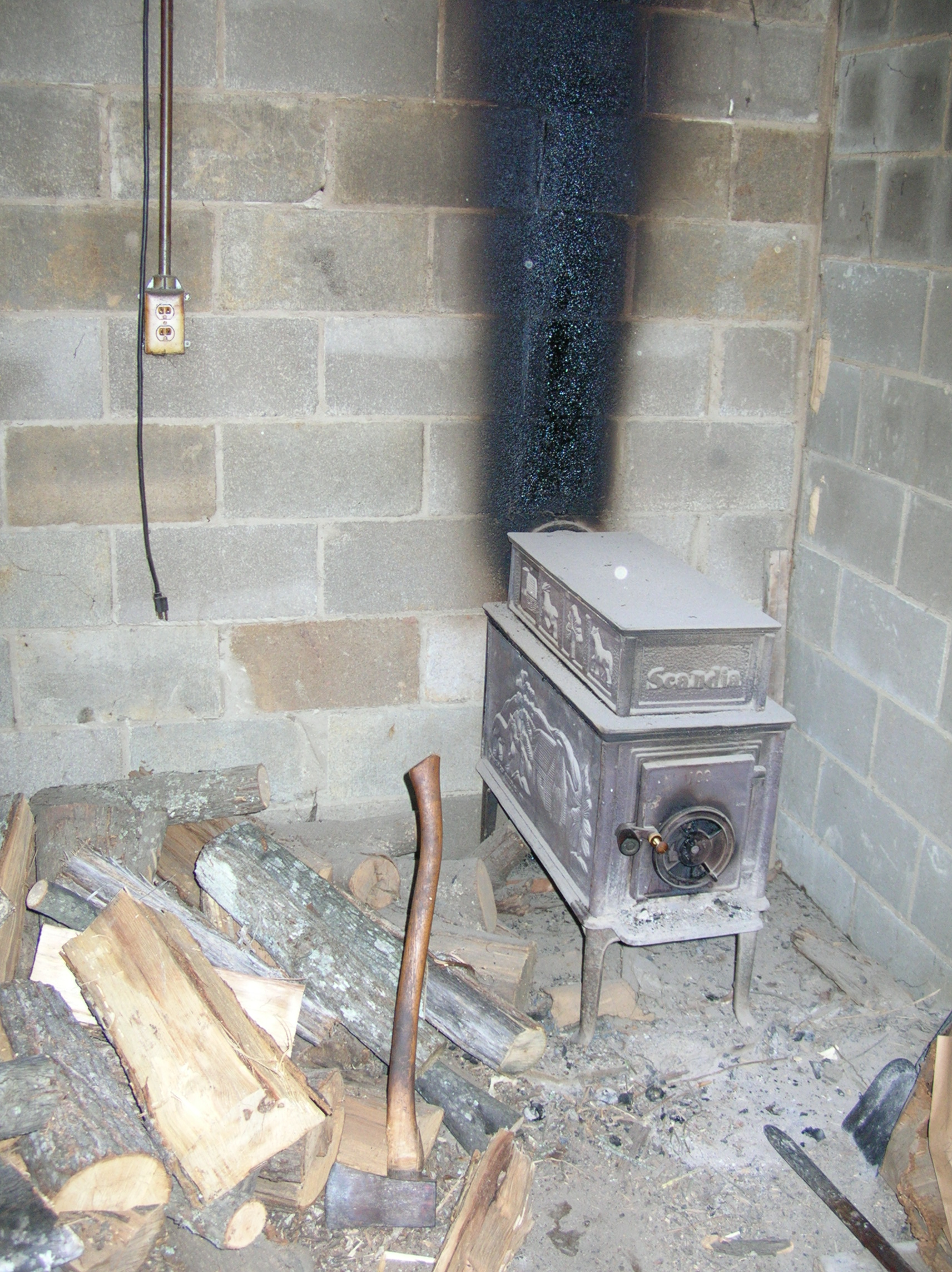
Benton's wood-fired stove, smokehouse

== See also ==
- List of smoked foods
