= Corby Kummer =

American food writer

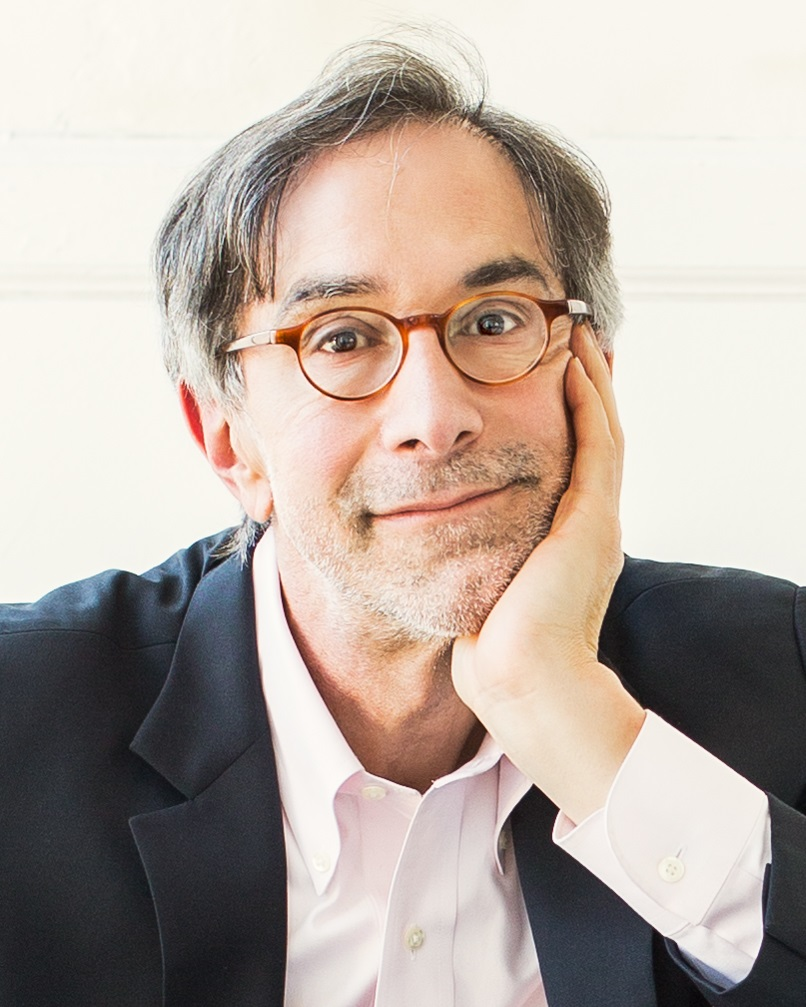
Kummer is executive director of the Food and Society policy program at the Aspen Institute, a senior editor of The Atlantic, and senior lecturer at the Tufts Friedman School of Nutrition Science.

Corby Kummer is executive director of Food & Society at the Aspen Institute, a senior editor of The Atlantic, and a senior lecturer at the Tufts Friedman School of Nutrition Science.

Kummer is the author of The Joy of Coffee and The Pleasures of Slow Food, the first book in English on the Slow Food movement, He has been called "a dean among food writers in America" by The San Francisco Examiner. Julia Child once said, "I think he's a very good food writer. He really does his homework. As a reporter and a writer he takes his work very seriously." He has received six James Beard Journalism Awards.

== Early life ==
Corby Kummer is a son of Dr. Seymour I. Kummer of Ellington, Connecticut, and F. Ruth Kummer, and is a stepson of Joan Kummer. He attended high school at Loomis Chaffee, and Yale University.

== Career ==
Kummer is the executive director of Food & Society at the Aspen Institute which includes initiatives such as the Food Leaders Fellowship, Food is Medicine, Open Access, and Conversations on Food Justice.

He has worked at The Atlantic magazine since the 1980s, currently as a senior editor. For years, he wrote a longstanding and influential column on food, cooking, with a special focus on Italy and sustainable farming and food-making processes. He has also been the restaurant critic of New York, Boston, and Atlanta Magazines and a food and food policy columnist for The New Republic.

Kummer appears frequently on television and radio programs with a weekly appearance on WGBH's Boston Public Radio as a featured food policy commentator and as a judge on The Food Network's Beat Bobby Flay.

He is currently a senior lecturer at Tufts University Friedman School.

== Awards ==
Kummer is the winner of six James Beard Journalism Awards, presented by the James Beard Foundation for food writing. His most recent was in 2008. He has been a finalist for the National Magazine Awards.

== Books ==
- The Joy of Coffee: The Essential Guide to Buying, Brewing, and Enjoying (2003)
- The Pleasures of Slow Food: Celebrating Authentic Traditions, Flavors, and Recipes (2008)
