= Mexican cuisine =

Culinary traditions of Mexico

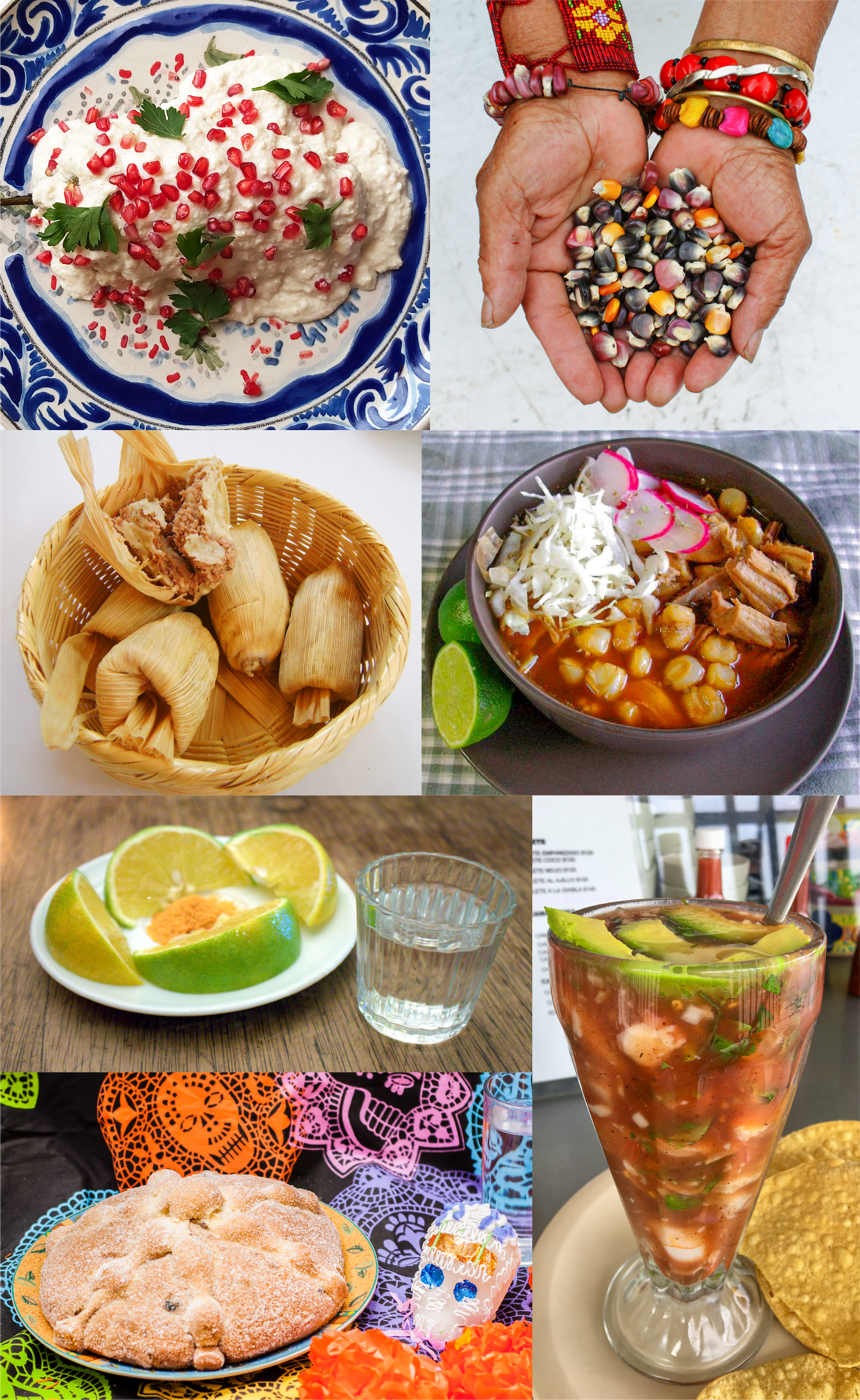
Chile en nogada, maize, tamales, pozole, mezcal, pan de muerto, and cóctel de camarón

Mexican cuisine consists of the food traditions of Mexico. Its earliest roots lie in Mesoamerican cuisine. Mexican cuisine's ingredients and methods arise from the area's first agricultural communities, such as those of the Olmec and Maya, who domesticated maize, created the standard process of nixtamalization, and established foodways. Successive waves of other Mesoamerican groups brought with them their cooking methods. These included the Teotihuacanos, Toltec, Huastec, Zapotec, Mixtec, Otomi, Purépecha, Totonac, Mazatec, Mazahua, and Nahua. With the Mexica formation of the multi-ethnic Triple Alliance (Aztec Empire), culinary foodways became infused (Aztec cuisine).

Today's food staples native to the land include corn (maize), turkey, beans, squash, amaranth, chia, avocados, tomatoes, tomatillos, cacao, vanilla, agave, spirulina, sweet potato, cactus, and chili pepper. Its history over the centuries has resulted in regional cuisines based on local conditions, including Baja Med, Chiapas, Veracruz, Oaxacan, Lebanese Mexican and the American cuisines of New Mexican and Tex-Mex.

After the Spanish Conquest of the Aztec empire and the rest of Mesoamerica, Spaniards introduced a number of other foods, the most important of which were meats from domesticated animals (beef, pork, chicken, goat, and sheep), dairy products (especially cheese and milk), rice, sugar, olive oil and various fruits and vegetables. Various cooking styles and recipes were also introduced from Spain both throughout the colonial period and by Spanish immigrants who continued to arrive following independence. Spanish influence in Mexican cuisine is also noticeable in its sweets, such as alfajores, alfeniques, borrachitos and churros.

African influence was also introduced during this era as a result of African slavery in New Spain through the Atlantic slave trade and the Manila-Acapulco Galleons.

Mexican cuisine is an important aspect of the culture, social structure and popular traditions of Mexico. An example of this connection is the use of mole for special occasions and holidays, particularly in the south and central regions of the country. For this reason and others, traditional Mexican cuisine was inscribed in 2010 on the Representative List of the Intangible Cultural Heritage of Humanity by UNESCO.

== Basic elements ==
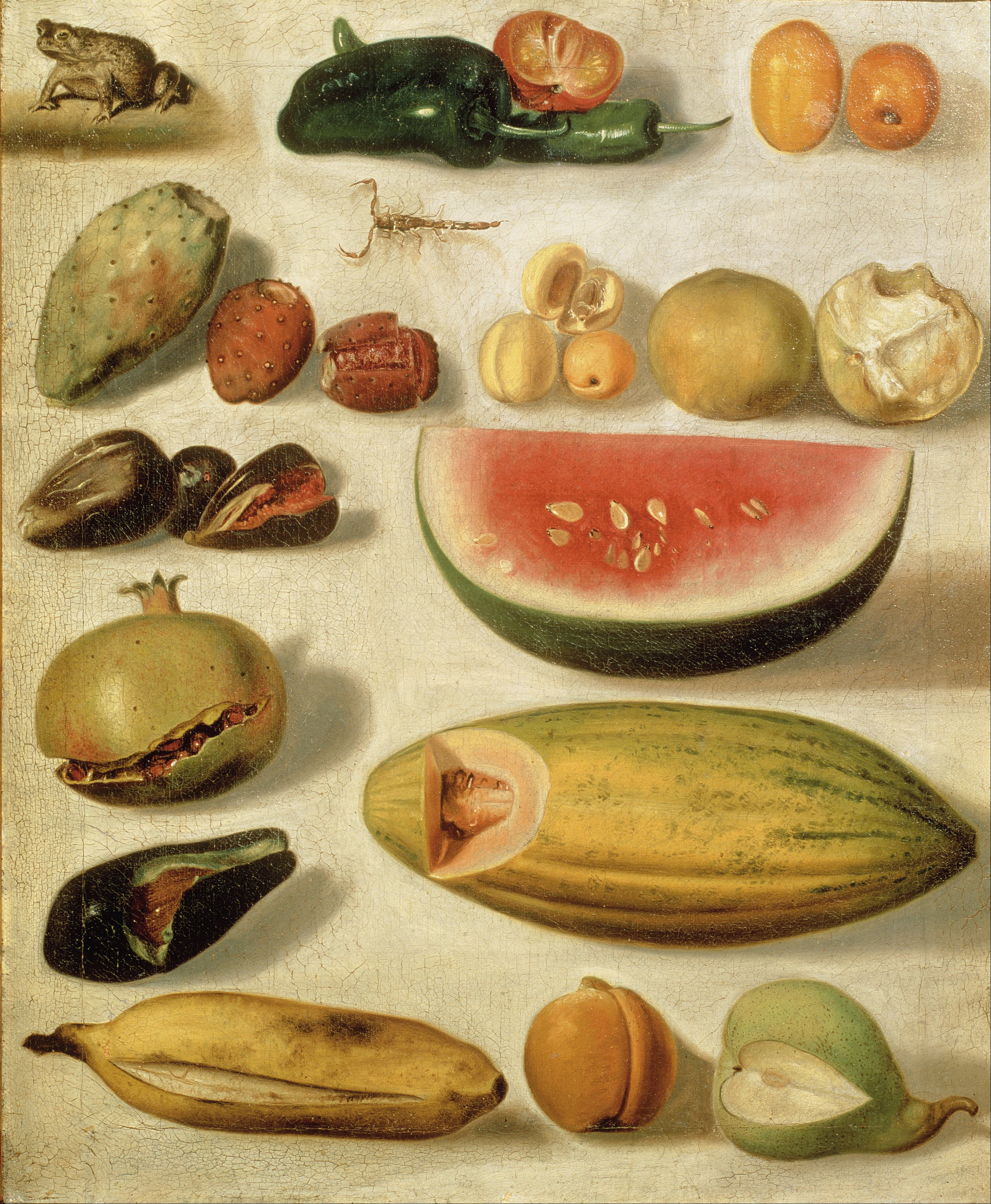
Still-life with Fruit, Scorpion and Frog (1874) by Hermenegildo Bustos

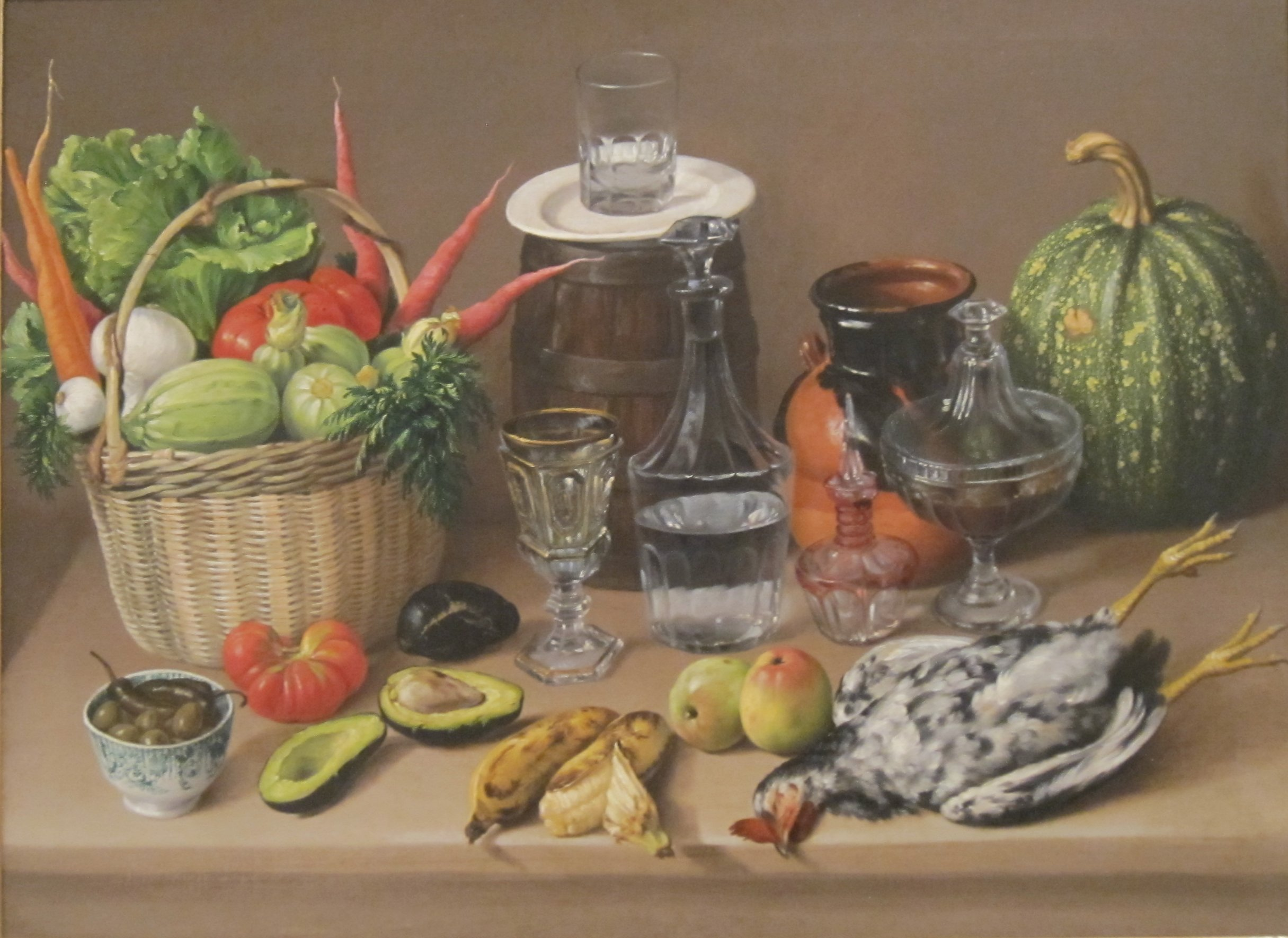
Still-life, oil on canvas painting by José Agustín Arrieta (Mexican), c. 1870, San Diego Museum of Art

Mexican cuisine is a complex and ancient cuisine, with techniques and skills developed over thousands of years of history. It is created mostly with ingredients native to Mexico, as well as those brought over by the Spanish conquistadors, with some new influences since then.

In addition to staples such as corn and chili peppers, native ingredients include squashes, avocados, cocoa and vanilla, as well as ingredients not generally used in other cuisines, such as edible flowers, vegetables like huauzontle and papaloquelite, or small criollo avocados, whose skin is edible. Chocolate originated in Mexico and was prized by the Aztecs. It remains an important ingredient in Mexican cookery.

Vegetables play an important role in Mexican cuisine. Common vegetables include zucchini, cauliflower, corn, potatoes, spinach, Swiss chard, mushrooms, jitomate (red tomato), and green tomato. Other traditional vegetable ingredients include chili pepper, huitlacoche (corn fungus), huauzontle, and nopal (cactus pads).

European contributions include pork, chicken, beef, cheese, herbs and spices, as well as some fruits.

Tropical fruits, many of which are indigenous to the Americas, such as guava, prickly pear, sapote, mangoes, bananas, pineapple and cherimoya (custard apple) are popular, especially in the center and south of the country.

Edible insects have been enjoyed in Mexico for millennia. Entemophagy or insect-eating is becoming increasingly popular outside of poor and rural areas for its unique flavors, sustainability, and connection to pre-Hispanic heritage. Popular species include chapulines (grasshoppers or crickets), escamoles (ant larvae), cumiles (stink bugs) and ahuatle (water bug eggs).

=== Maize ===
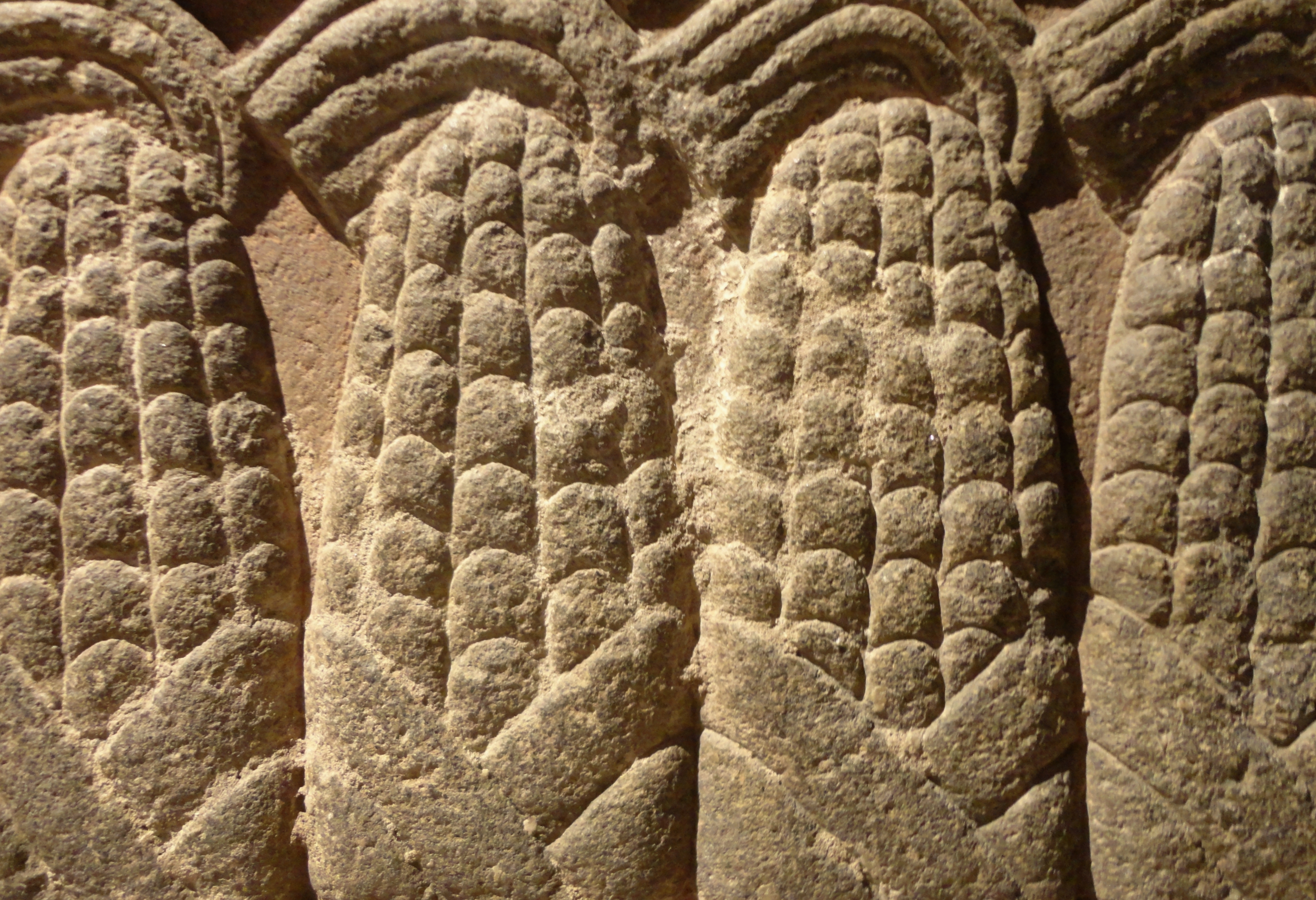
Ancient Mesoamerican engraving of maize, National Museum of Anthropology of México

Despite the introduction of wheat and rice to Mexico, maize is the most commonly consumed grain in almost all areas of the country and serves as the main ingredient in many local recipes (such as maize tortillas, atole, pozole, menudo, and tamal). While also eaten fresh, most maize is dried, nixtamalized and ground into a dough called masa. This dough is used both fresh and fermented to make a wide variety of dishes, from drinks (such as atole and pozole) to tamales, sopes, and many other foods. However, the most common way to eat maize in Mexico is in the form of tortillas, which accompany almost every dish. Tortillas are made of maize in most of the country, but other regional versions exist, such as wheat in the north or plantain, yuca and wild greens in Oaxaca.

=== Chile peppers ===
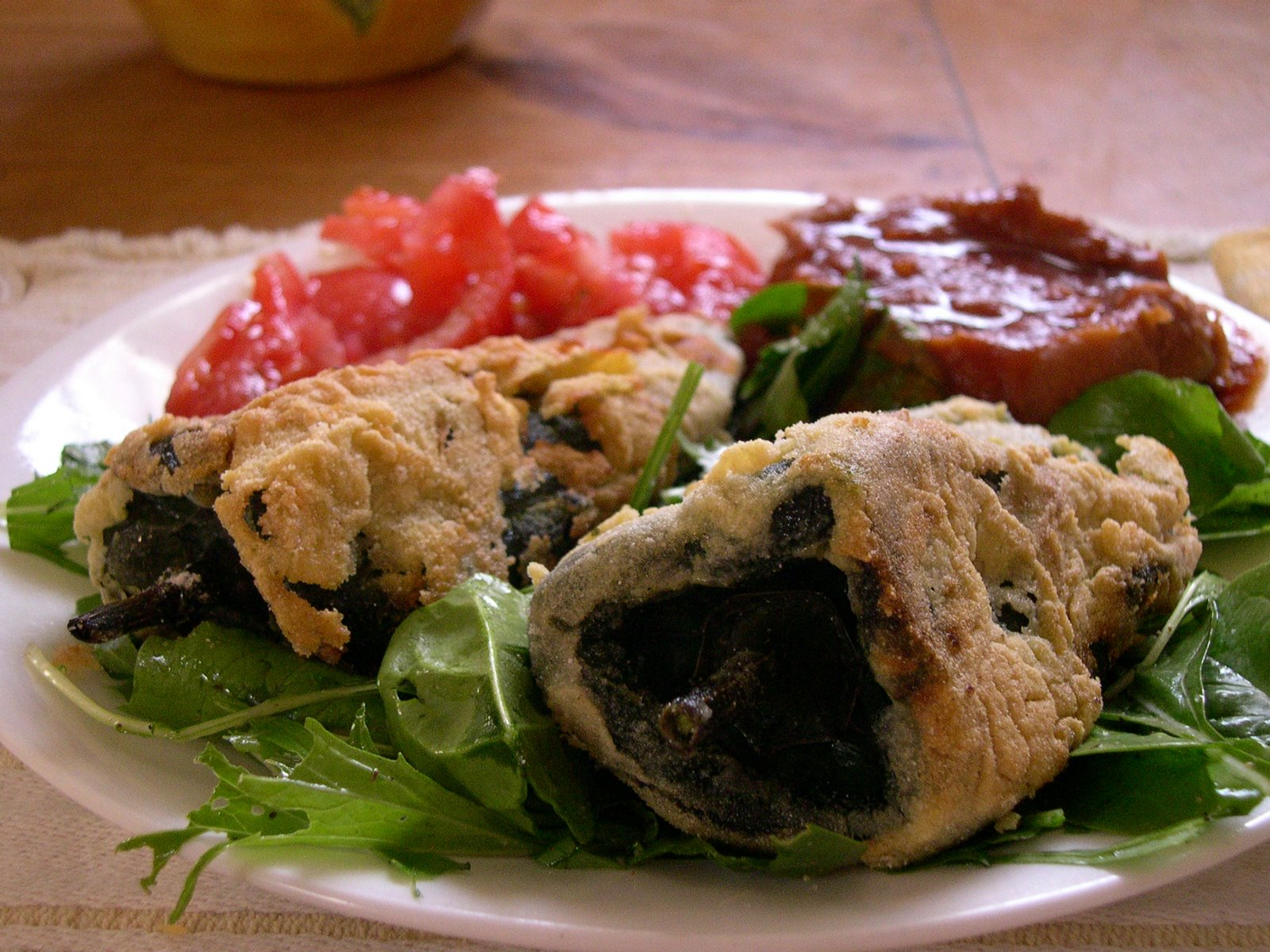
Chiles rellenos, stuffed chile peppers

The other basic ingredient in all parts of Mexico is the chile pepper. Mexican food has a reputation for being very spicy, but it has a wide range of flavors and while many spices are used for cooking, not all are spicy. Many dishes also have subtle flavors. Chiles are indigenous to Mexico and their use dates back thousands of years. They are used for their flavors and not just their heat, with Mexico using the widest variety. If a savory dish or snack does not contain chile pepper, hot sauce is usually added, and chile pepper is often added to fresh fruit and sweets.

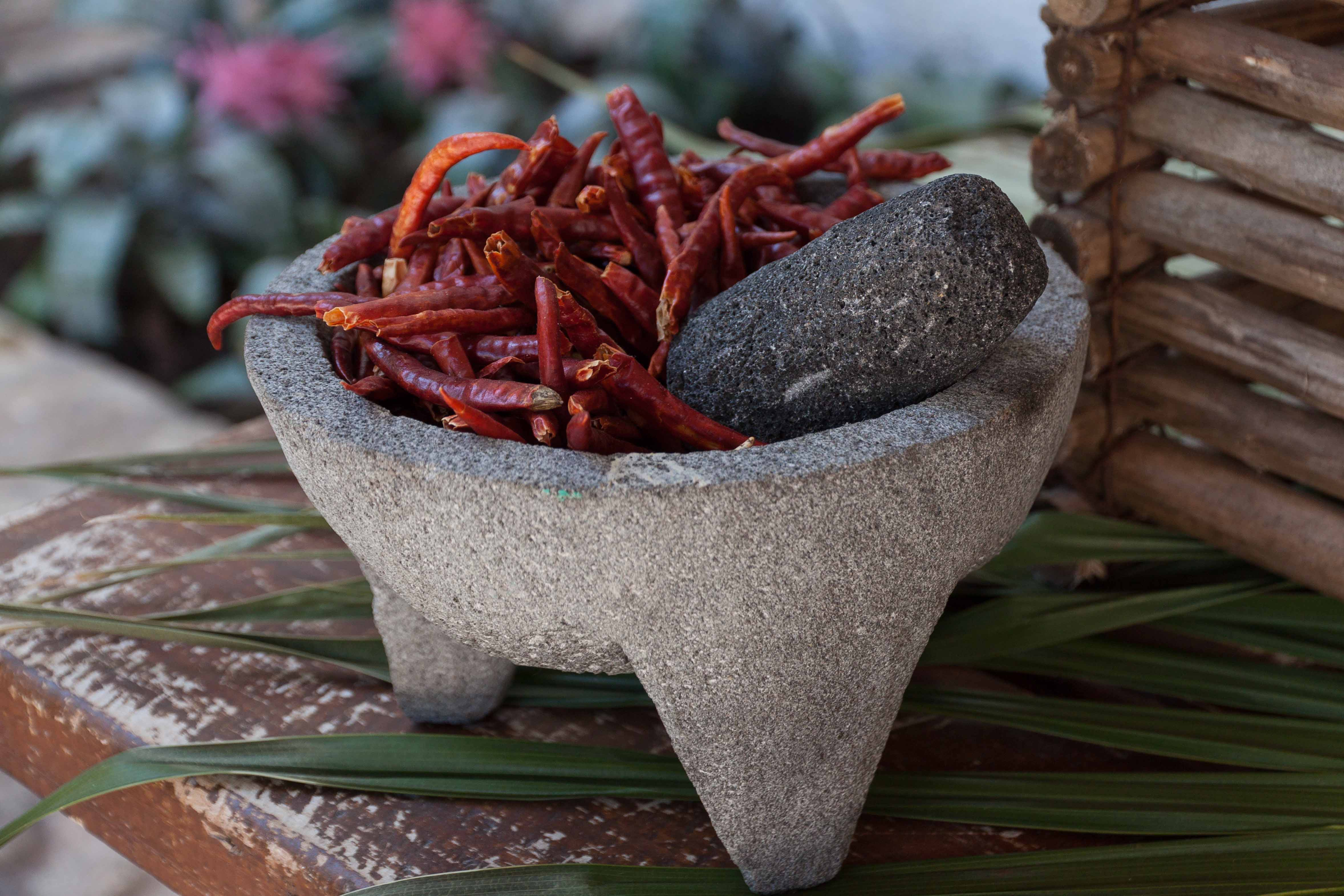
A molcajete and tejolote, the traditional mortar and pestle of Mexico

The importance of the chile goes back to the Mesoamerican period, where it was considered to be as much of a staple as corn and beans. In the 16th century, Bartolomé de las Casas wrote that, without chiles, the indigenous people did not think they were eating. Even today, most Mexicans believe that their national identity would be at a loss without chiles and the many varieties of sauces and salsas created using chiles as their base.

Taco

Many dishes in Mexico are defined by their sauces and the chiles those sauces contain (which are usually very spicy), rather than the meat or vegetable that the sauce covers. These dishes include entomatada (in tomato sauce), adobo or adobados, pipians and moles. A hominy soup called pozole is defined as white, green or red depending on the chile sauce used or omitted. Tamales are differentiated by the filling which is again defined by the sauce (red or green chile pepper or mole). Dishes without a sauce are rarely eaten without salsa or without fresh or pickled chiles. This includes street foods, such as tacos, tortas, soup, sopes, tlacoyos, tlayudas, gorditas and sincronizadas. For most dishes, it is the type of chile used that gives it its main flavor. Chipotle, smoked-dried jalapeño pepper, is very common in Mexican cuisine.

=== Beans ===
In addition to corn, common beans (Phaseolus vulgaris) are a historical component of the Mexican diet. Genetic evidence indicates domestication occurred in Mesoamerica as well as South America Common bean varieties and cultivars used in Mexican cuisine include the pinto bean and the black turtle bean. Beans and corn are deficient in different essential amino acids but complement each other. When eaten in combination, they provide a complete protein source.

=== Spanish contributions ===
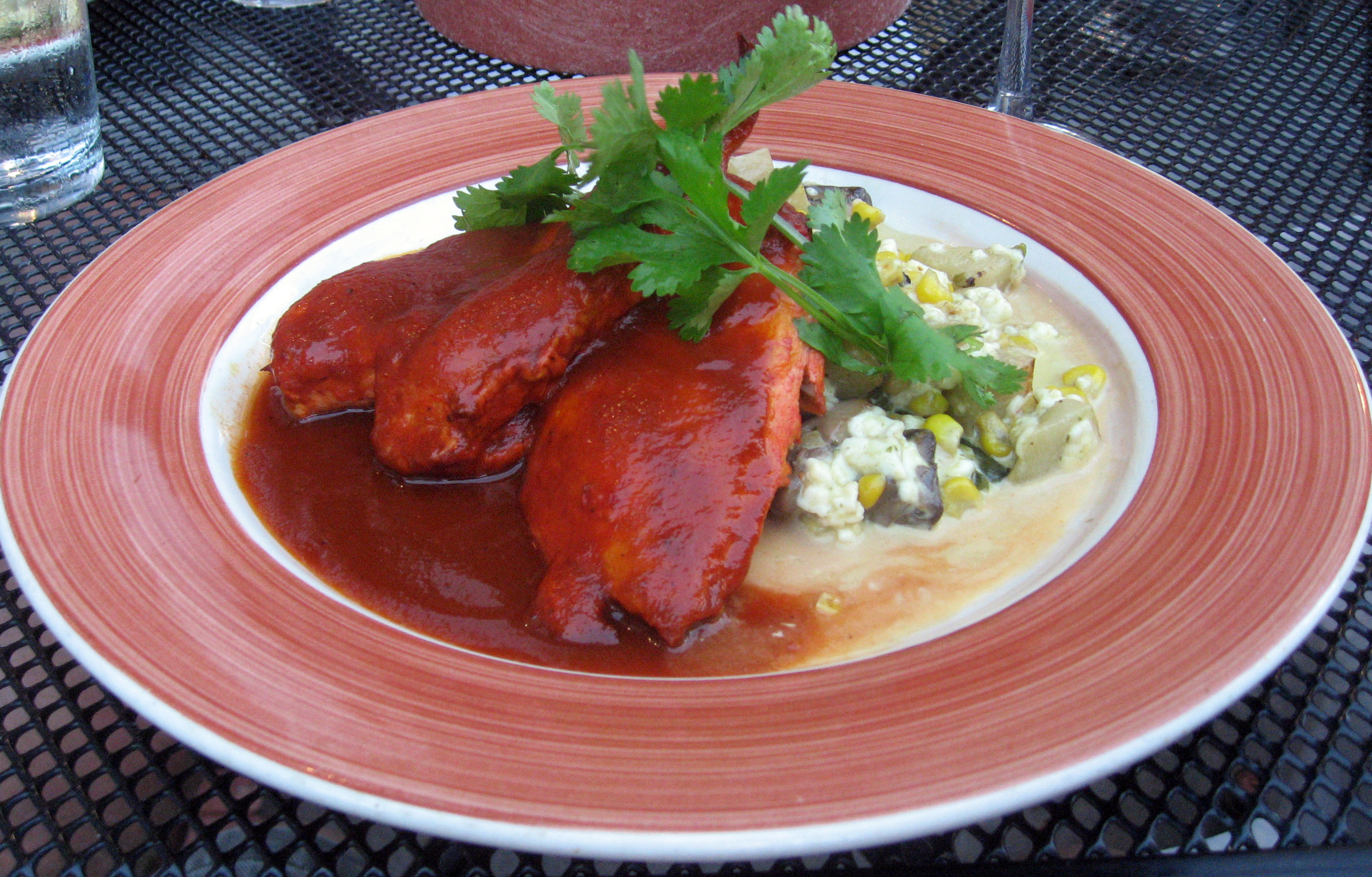
Pechuga adobada, chicken breast in adobo with a side of chayote, mushrooms, corn and poblano rajas. Adobo, including a key item, vinegar, arrived with the Spanish. A common characteristic of Mexican adobo is its incorporation of chile ancho.

Together with Mesoamerica, Spain is the second basis of Mexican cuisine, contributing in two fundamental ways: Firstly, they brought with them Old World staples and ingredients which did not exist in the Americas such as sugar, wheat, rice, onions, garlic, limes, cooking oil, dairy products, pork, beef and many others. Secondly, they brought various culinary traditions from the Iberian peninsula which have become prevalent in Mexico. Equally, the discovery of the incorporation of New World ingredients to Spanish cuisine has led to the shared naming of foods such as chorizo, which uses paprika in both its Mexican and modern Spanish forms.

Spanish cuisine was in turn heavily influenced by its Moorish heritage and this created one of the earliest instances of fusion cuisine. The Spanish also introduced the technique of frying in pork fat. Today, the main meats found in Mexico are pork, chicken, beef, goat, and sheep. Fish and other seafood are also popular, especially along the coasts, and the cooking method commonly has a Spanish origin such as with Huachinango a la vizcaina.

Cheesemaking in Mexico has evolved its specialties, although Spanish-style cheese such as Manchego is also produced in Mexico. It is an important economic activity, especially in the north, and is frequently done at home. The main cheese-making areas are Chihuahua, Oaxaca, Querétaro, and Chiapas. Goat cheese is still made, but it is not as popular and is harder to find in stores.

Churros are a common snack originating in Spain and because sugar cane was brought to the Americas through Spanish colonization, all of Mexico's sweets have a Hispanic origin, often with a Muslim heritage such as Alfeñiques.

== Food and society ==
=== Home cooking ===
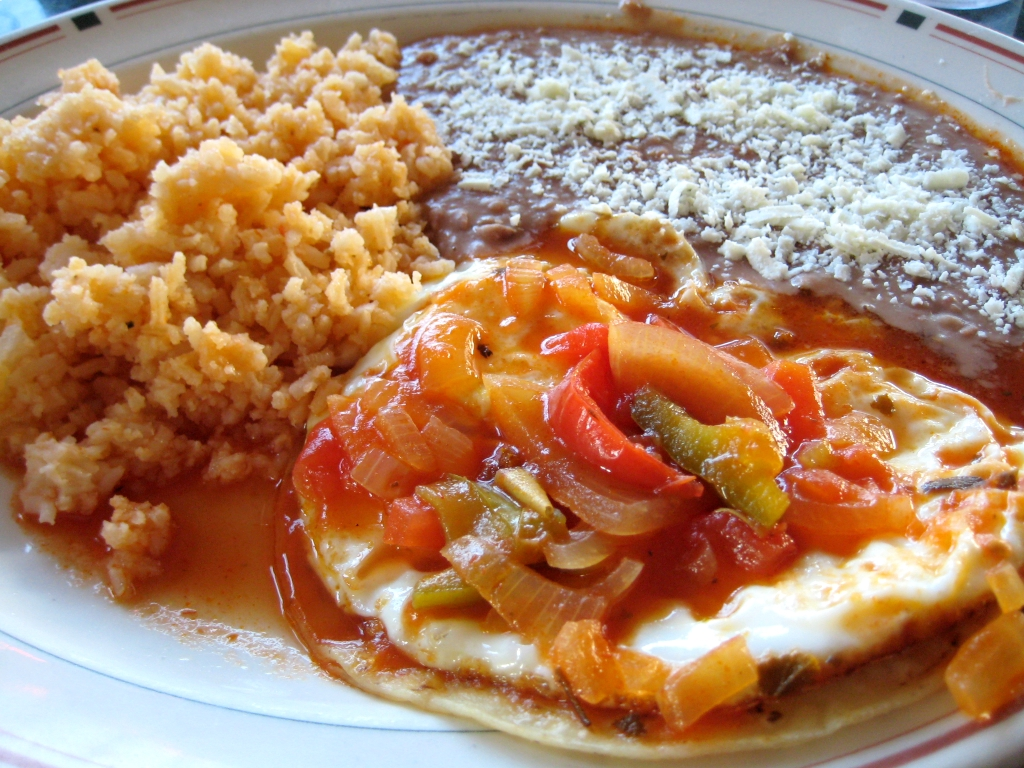
Huevos rancheros

In most of Mexico, especially in rural areas, food is commonly eaten at home.

The typical Mexican household has four meals throughout the day: a light breakfast, commonly including coffee/atole (maize drink), and a light meal around 11 a.m., which includes a snack and drink. These are followed by "comida" (as opposed to "almuerzo"), between noon and 2 p.m. This is usually the heaviest meal of the day. It sometimes begins with soup, often chicken broth with pasta or a "dry soup", which is pasta or rice flavored with onions, garlic or vegetables. The main course is meat served in a cooked sauce with salsa on the side, accompanied with beans and tortillas and often with a fruit drink in some areas. The last meal of the day is supper, which varies greatly by region, and is usually eaten between 6 p.m. and 9 p.m.

In the evening, it is common to eat leftovers from the comida or sweet bread accompanied by coffee or chocolate. Breakfast can consist of meat in broth (such as pancita), tacos, enchiladas or meat with eggs. This is usually served with beans, tortillas, and coffee or juice.

=== Food and festivals ===
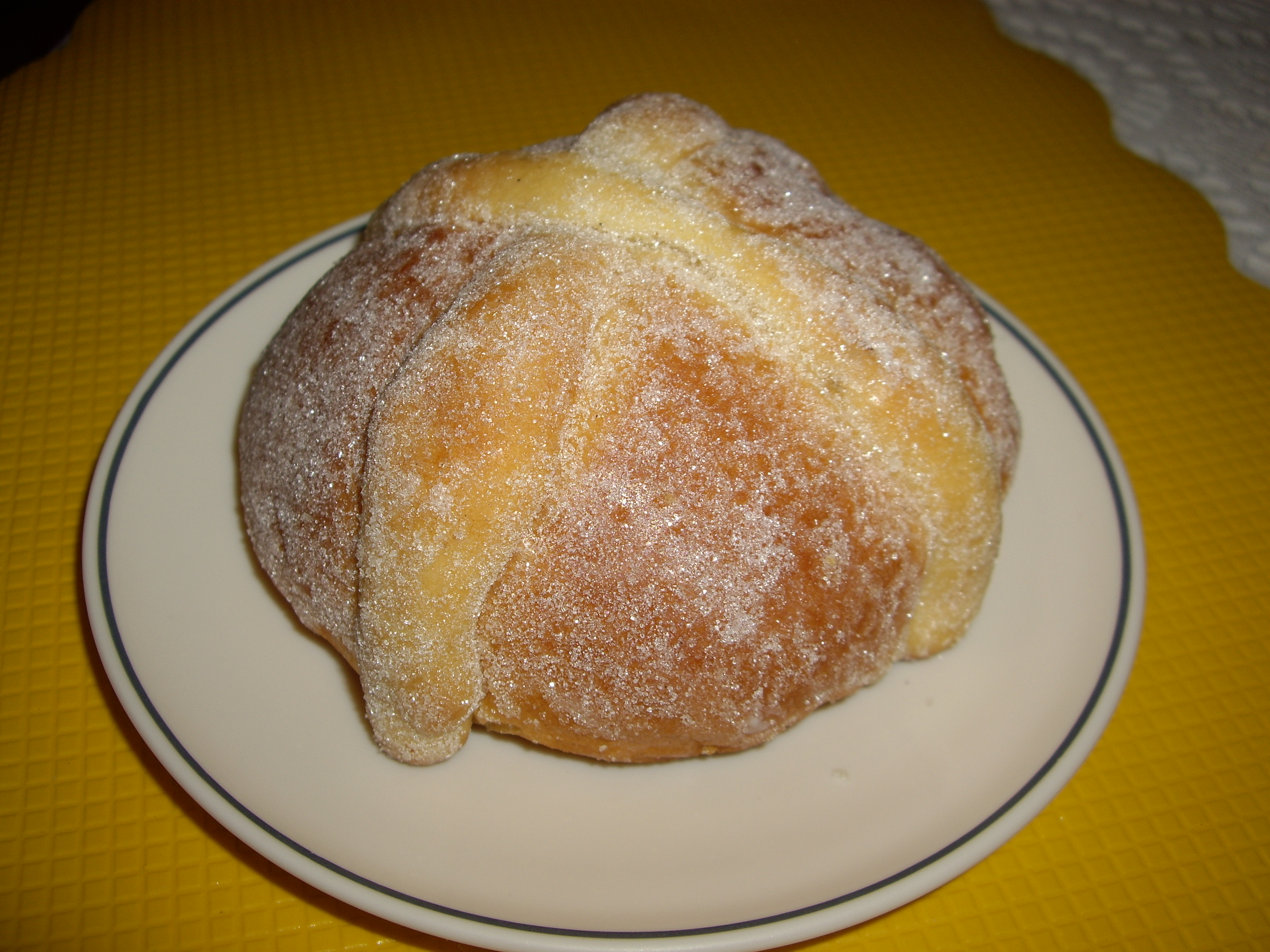
Pan de muerto is traditionally baked in Mexico during the weeks leading up to the Day of the Dead.

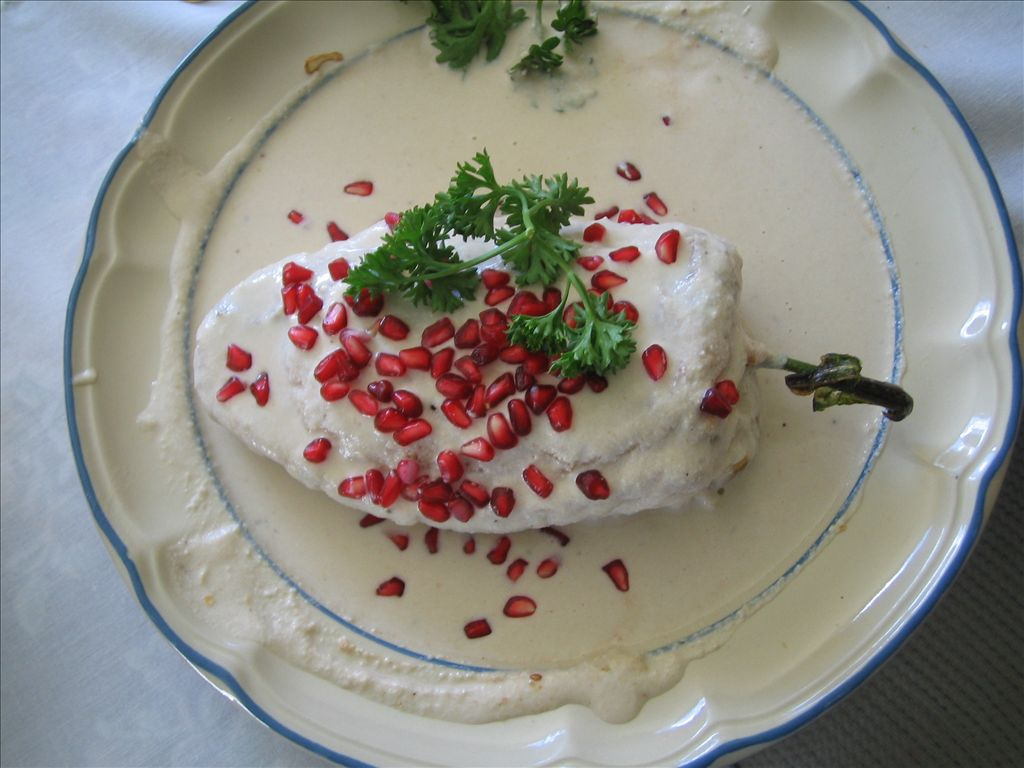
Chiles en nogada, due to the dish's incorporation of red, white and green, is popularly consumed during the celebrations of the Grito de Dolores. Tied to the independence of the country since it is said they were prepared for the first time to entertain the future emperor Agustín de Iturbide when he came to signing of the Treaty of Córdoba.

Mexican cuisine is elaborate and often tied to symbolism and festivals, which is one reason it was named as an example of the Intangible Cultural Heritage of Humanity by UNESCO. Many of the foods of Mexico are complicated because of their relation to the social structure of the country. Food preparation, especially for family and social events, is considered to be an investment in order to maintain social relationships. Even the idea of flavor is considered to be social, with meals prepared for certain dinners and certain occasions when they are considered the most tasty.

The ability to cook well, called "sazón" (lit. seasoning) is considered to be a gift generally gained from experience and a sense of commitment to the diners. For the Day of the Dead festival, foods such as tamales and mole are set out on altars and it is believed that the visiting dead relatives eat the essence of the food. If eaten afterwards by the living it is considered to be tasteless. In central Mexico, the main festival foods are mole, barbacoa, carnitas and mixiotes. They are often prepared to feed hundreds of guests, requiring groups of cooks. The cooking is part of the social custom meant to bind families and communities.

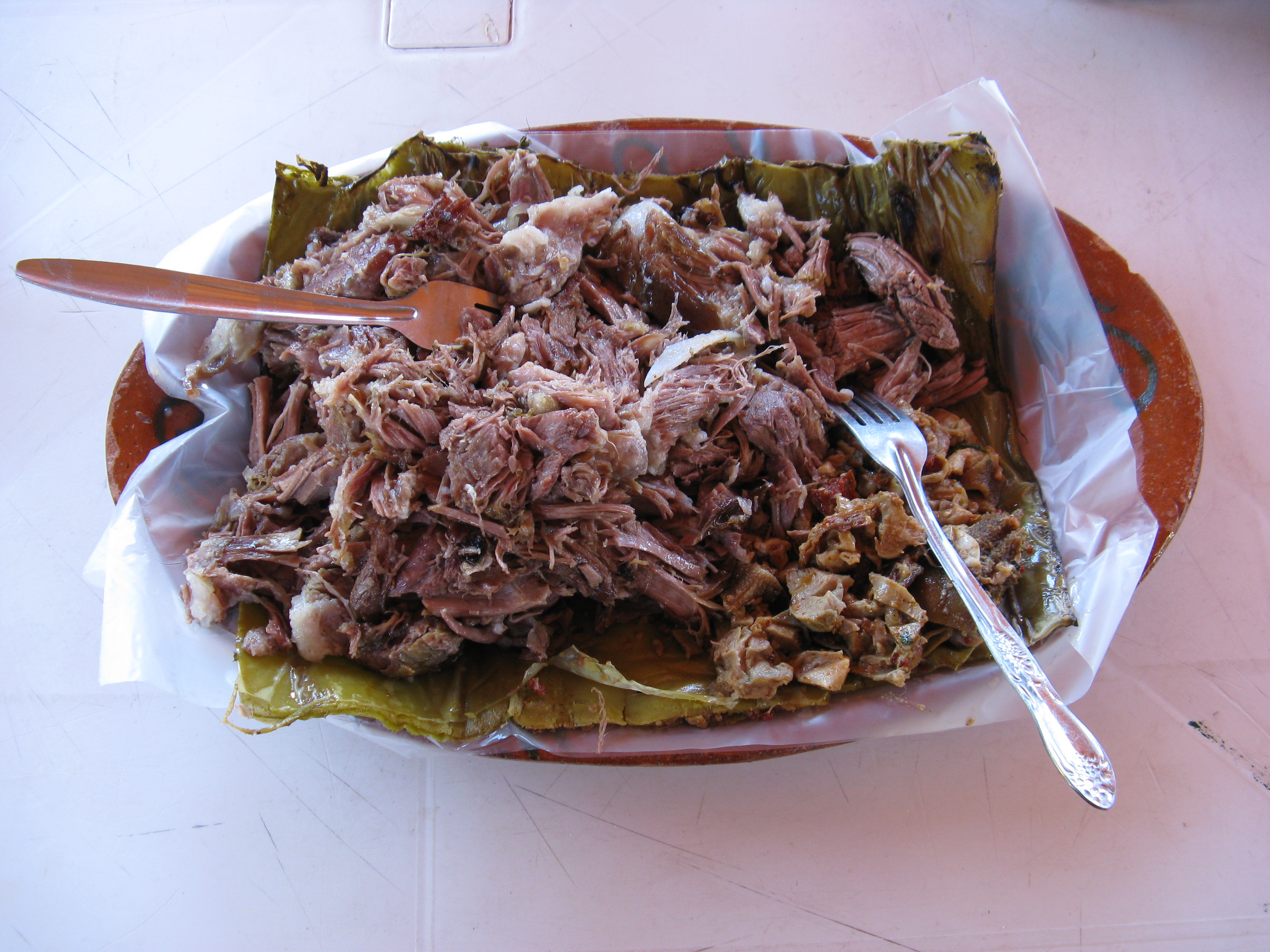
Barbacoa in Actopan, Hidalgo. The barbecue in a ground oven is a typical dish from the Mezquital Valley.

Mexican regional home cooking is completely different from the food served in most Mexican restaurants outside Mexico, which is usually some variety of Tex-Mex. The original versions of Mexican dishes are vastly different from their Tex-Mex variation.

Some of Mexico's traditional foods involved complex or long cooking processes, including cooking underground (such as cochinita pibil). Before industrialization, traditional women spent several hours a day boiling dried corn then grinding it on a metate to make the dough for tortillas, cooking them one-by-one on a comal griddle. In some areas, tortillas are still made this way. Sauces and salsas were also ground in a mortar called a molcajete. Today, blenders are more often used, though the texture is a bit different. Most people in Mexico would say that those made with a molcajete taste better, but few do this now.

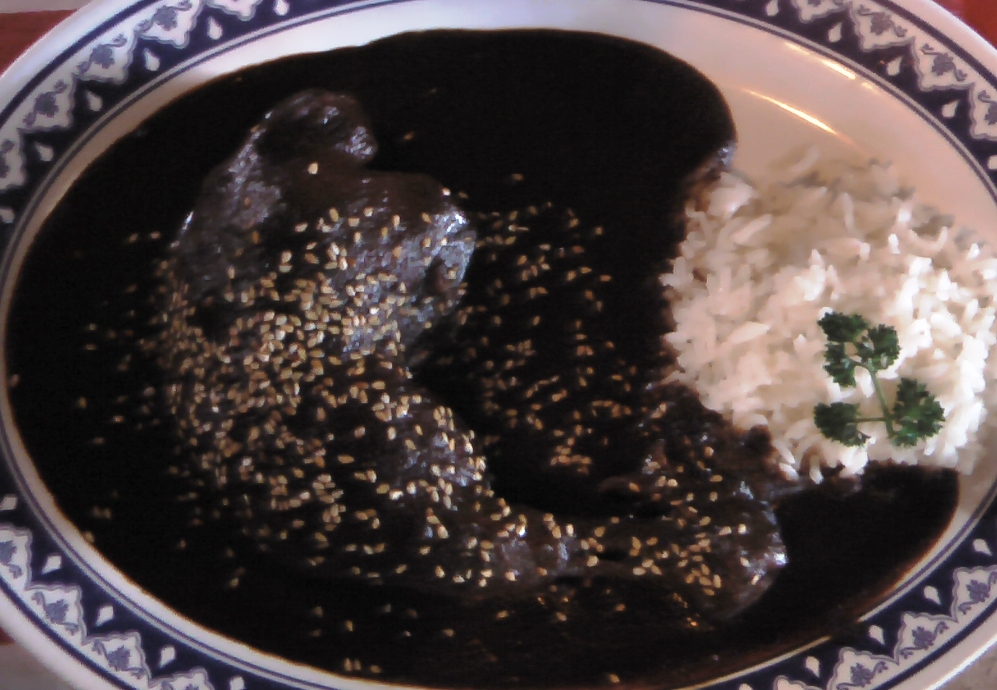
Mole sauce, with dozens of varieties across the Republic, is seen as a symbol of Mexicanidad and is considered Mexico's national dish.

A major food for festivals and other special occasions is mole, especially mole poblano in the center of the country. Mole is served at Christmas, Easter, Day of the Dead and at birthdays, baptisms, weddings and funerals, and tends to be eaten only for special occasions because it is such a complex and time-consuming dish. While still dominant in this way, other foods have become acceptable for these occasions, such as barbacoa, carnitas and mixiotes, especially since the 1980s. This may have been because of economic crises at that time, allowing for the substitution of these cheaper foods, or the fact that they can be bought ready-made or may already be made as part of the family business.

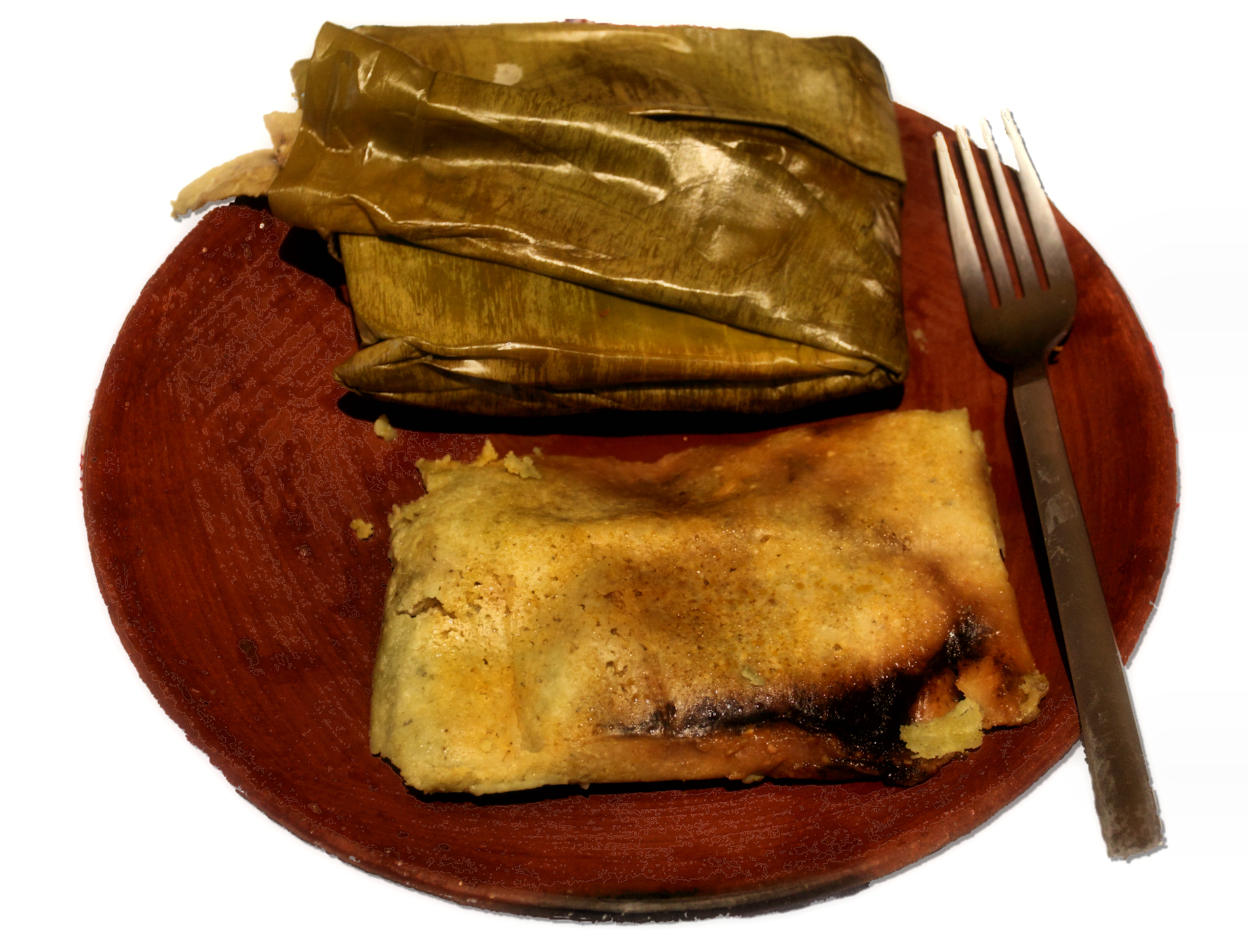
Tamal

Another important festive food is the tamale, also known as tamal in Spanish. This is a filled cornmeal dumpling, steamed in a wrapping (usually a corn husk or banana leaf) and one of the basic staples in most regions of Mexico. It has its origins in the pre-Hispanic era and today is found in many varieties in all of Mexico. Like a mole, it is complicated to prepare and best done in large amounts. Tamales are associated with certain celebrations such as Candlemas. They are wrapped in corn husks in the highlands and desert areas of Mexico and in banana leaves in the tropics.

=== Street food ===
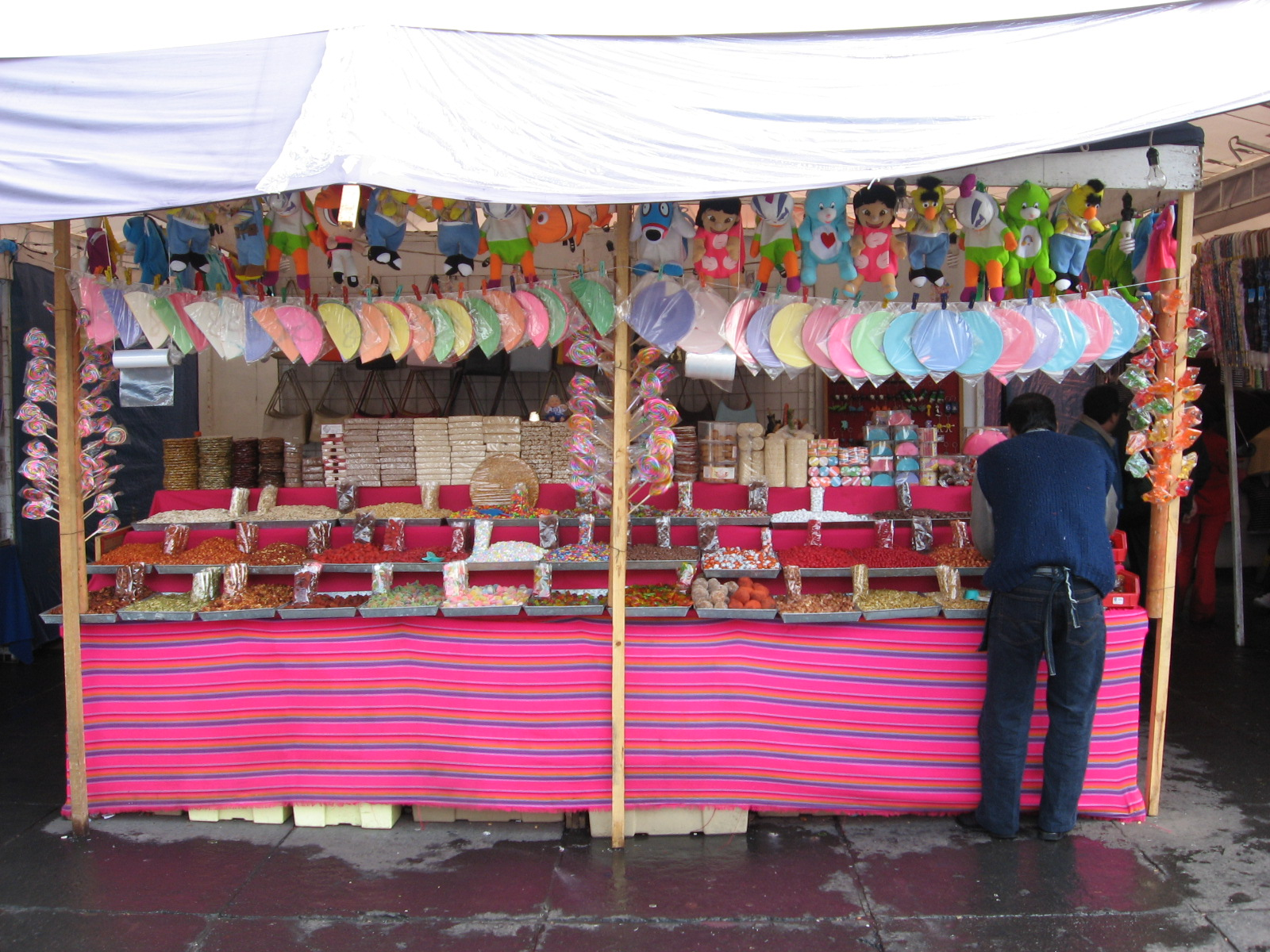
Mexican candy stand

Mexican street food can include tacos, quesadillas, pambazos, tamales, huaraches, alambres, al pastor, and food not suitable to cook at home, including barbacoa, carnitas, and since many homes in Mexico do not make use of ovens, roasted chicken. One attraction of street food in Mexico is the satisfaction of hunger or craving without all the social and emotional connotation of eating at home, although longtime customers can have something of a friendship/familial relationship with a chosen vendor.

Tacos are the top-rated and most well-known street Mexican food. It is made up of meat or other fillings wrapped in a tortilla often served with cheese added. Vegetarian fillings include mushrooms, potatoes, rice, or beans.

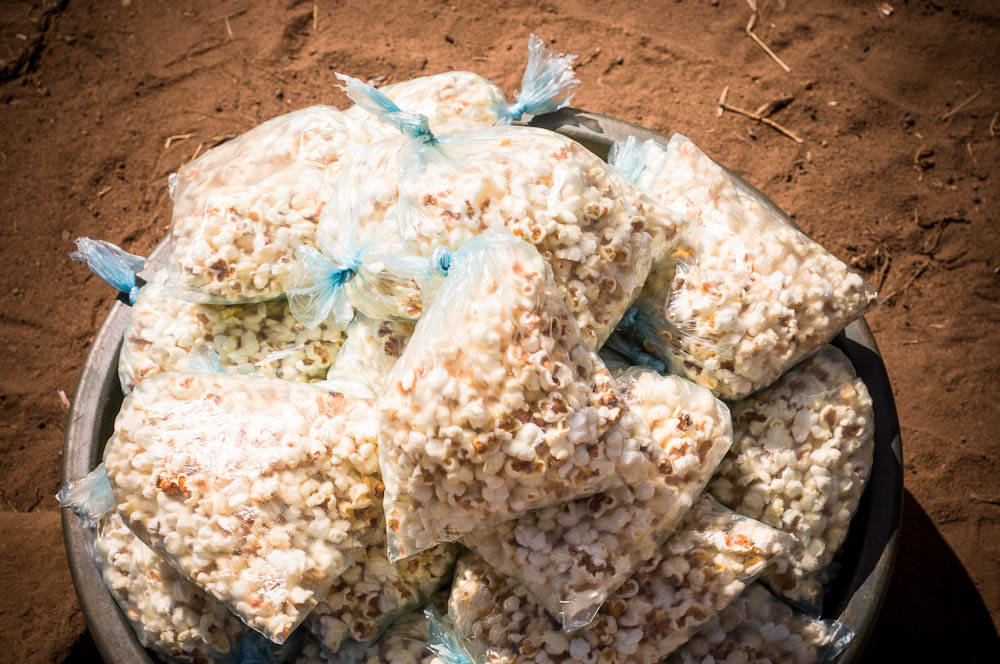
Popcorn Modern day.

The origin of tacos is based on the pre-Hispanic custom of picking up other foods with tortillas as utensils were not used. The origin of the word is in dispute, with some saying it is derived from Nahuatl and others from various Spanish phrases. It possible that the term taco comes from the term tlaco or tlacatl, which means middle or half in nahuatl. Tacos are not eaten as the main meal; they are generally eaten before midday or late in the evening. Just about any other foodstuff can be wrapped in a tortilla, and, in Mexico, it varies from rice, to meat (plain or in sauce), to cream, to vegetables, to cheese, or simply to plain chile peppers or fresh salsa. Preferred fillings vary from region to region with pork generally found more often in the center and south, beef in the north, seafood along the coasts, and chicken and lamb in most of the country.

Another popular street food, especially in Mexico City and the surrounding area is the torta. It consists of a roll of some type, stuffed with several ingredients. This has its origins in the 19th century, when the French introduced a number of new kinds of bread. The torta began by splitting the roll and adding beans. Today, refried beans can still be found on many kinds of tortas. In Mexico City, the most common roll used for tortas is called telera, a relatively flat roll with two splits on the upper surface. In Puebla, the preferred bread is called a cemita, as is the sandwich. In both areas, the bread is stuffed with various fillings, especially if it is a hot sandwich, with beans, cream (mayonnaise is rare), and some kind of hot chile pepper.

The influence of American fast food on Mexican street food grew during the late 20th century. One example of this is the invention of the Sonoran hot dog in the late 1980s. The frankfurters are usually boiled then wrapped in bacon and fried. They are served in a bolillo-style bun, typically topped by a combination of pinto beans, diced tomatoes, onions and jalapeño peppers, and other condiments.

Along the US-Mexican border, specifically dense areas like Tijuana, Mexican vendors sell food such as fruit melanged with Tajin spice to people crossing the border via carts. In recent years, these food carts have been threatened by tightened border security at the port of entry. Both the US and the Mexican governments have proposed a project that would widen the streets at the border, allowing for more people to pass through the border, although widening them would decimate neighboring mercados that rely on the business of travelers.

Besides food, street vendors also sell various kinds of drinks (including aguas frescas, tejuino, and tepache) and treats (such as bionicos, tostilocos, and raspados). Most tamale stands sell atole as a standard accompaniment.

Tacos of carnitas, carne asada and al pastor

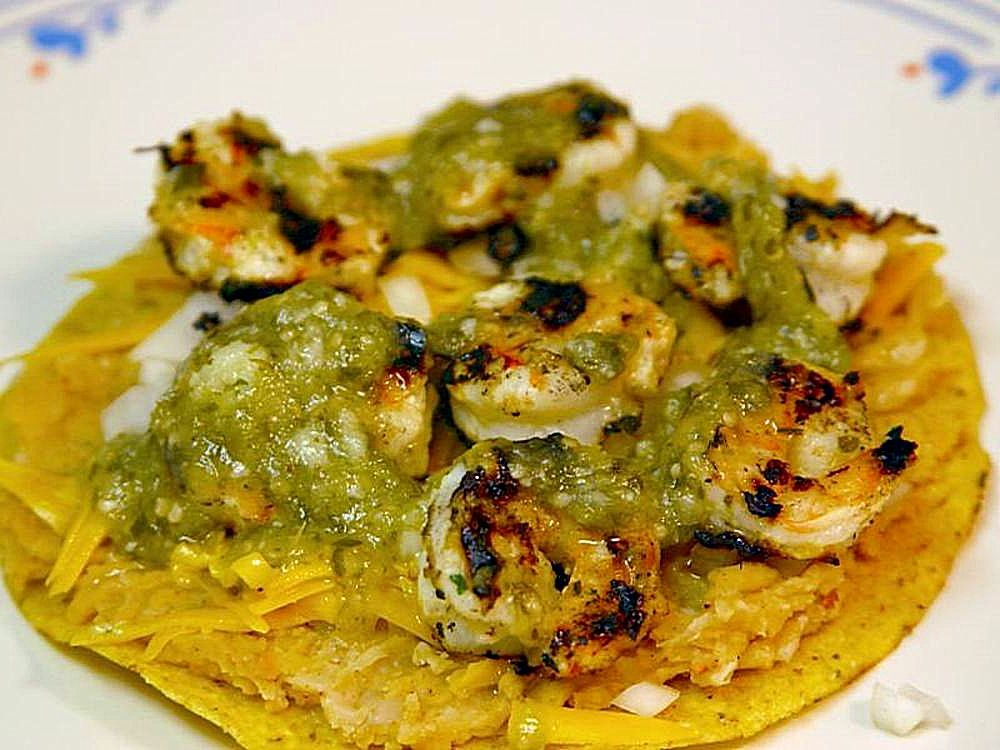
Tostada

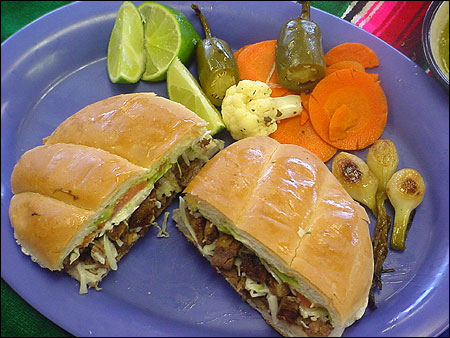
Mexican-style torta with typical accompaniments

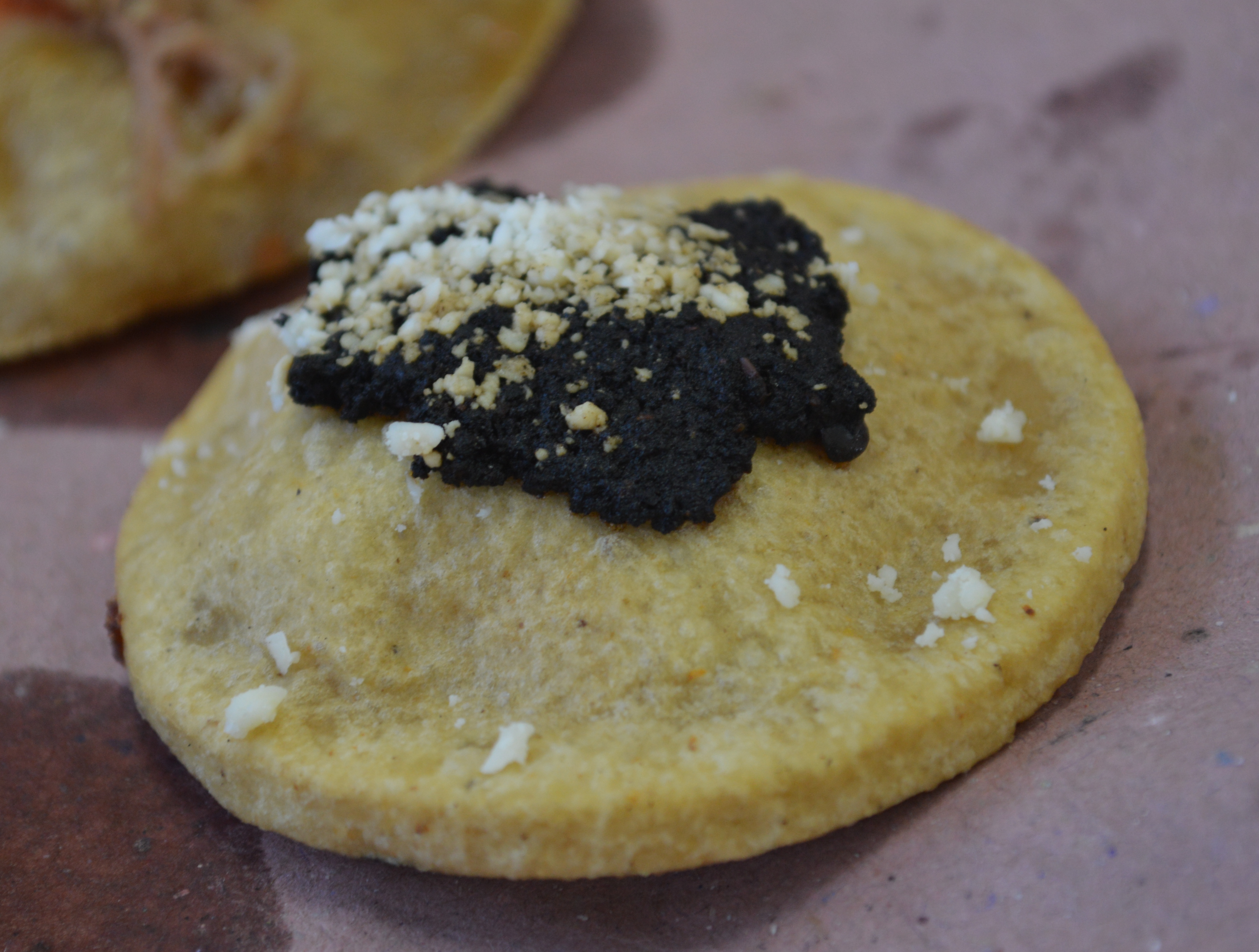
Bean mini-gordita flavored with avocado leaf Veracruz-style

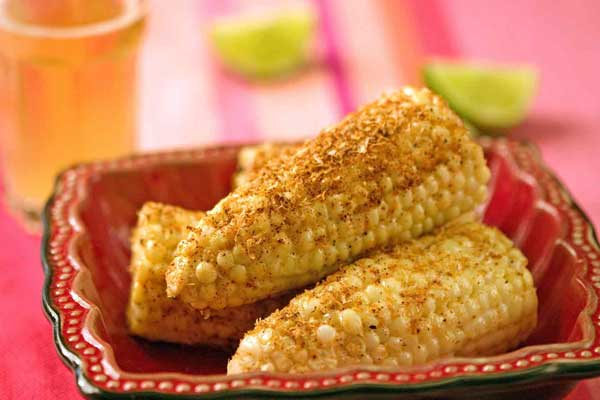
Corn

== History ==
=== Pre-Hispanic period ===
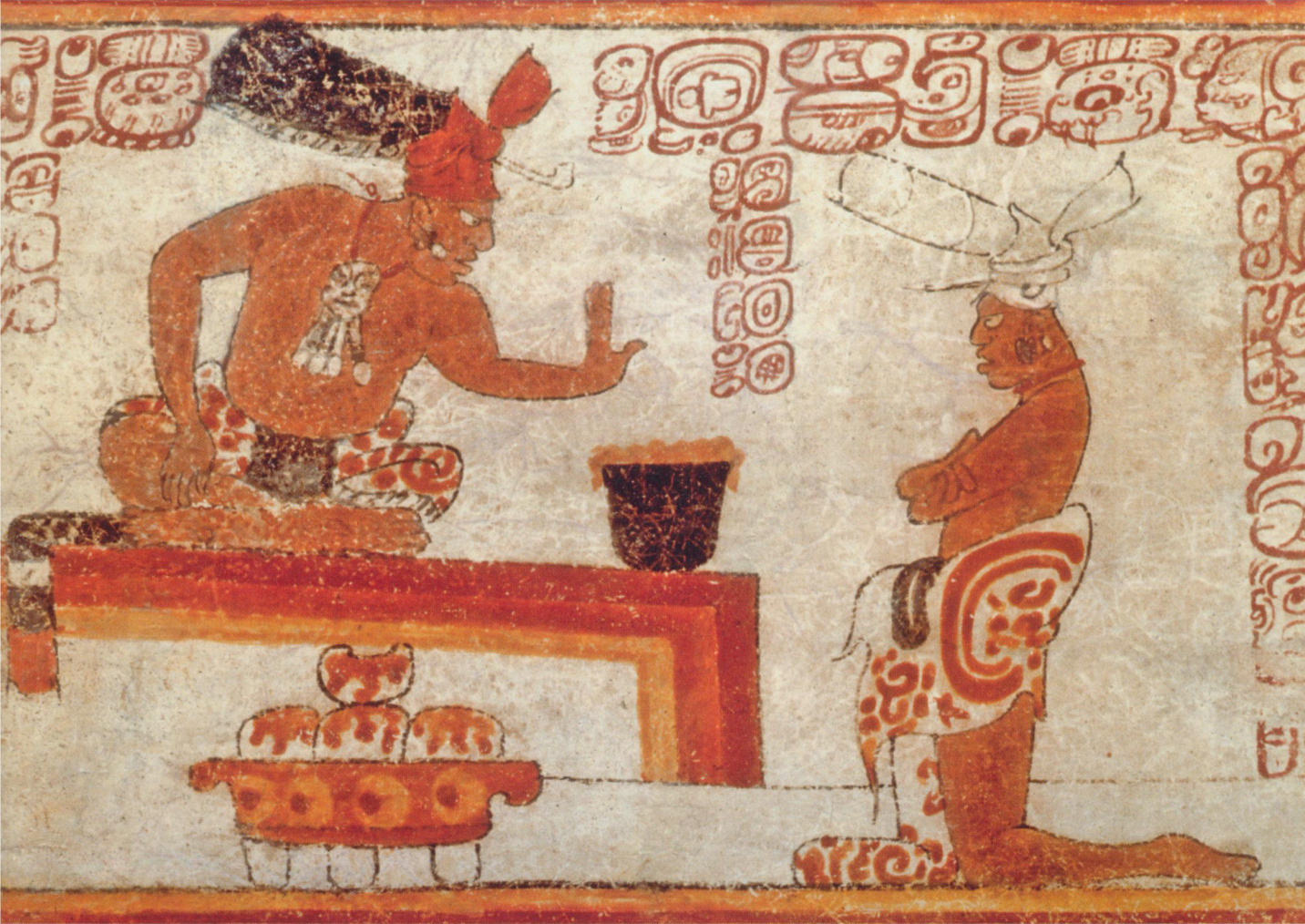
A Maya lord sits before an individual with a container of frothed chocolate

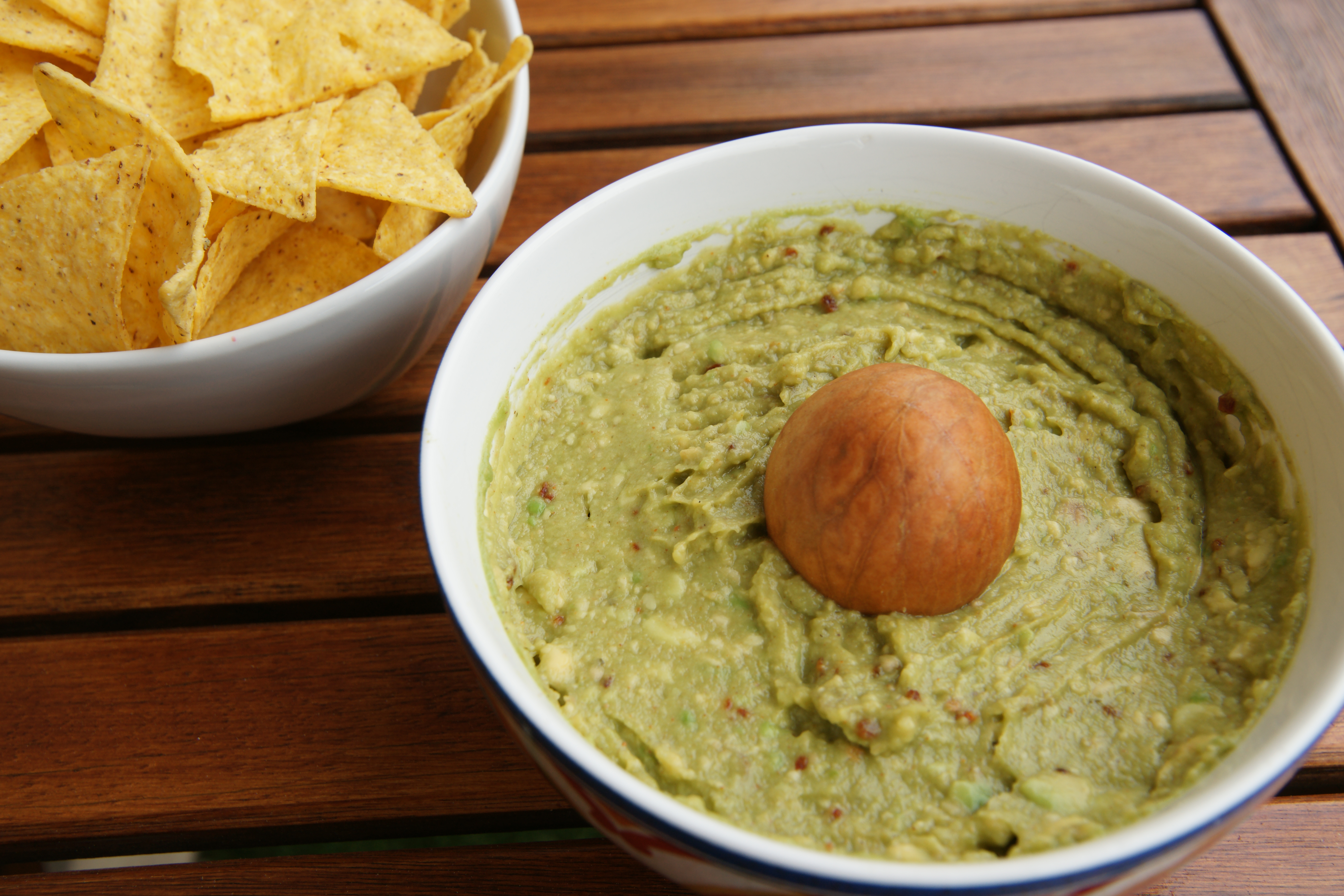
Guacamole (Nahuatl āhuacamolli), an avocado-based sauce that began in pre-Hispanic Mexico

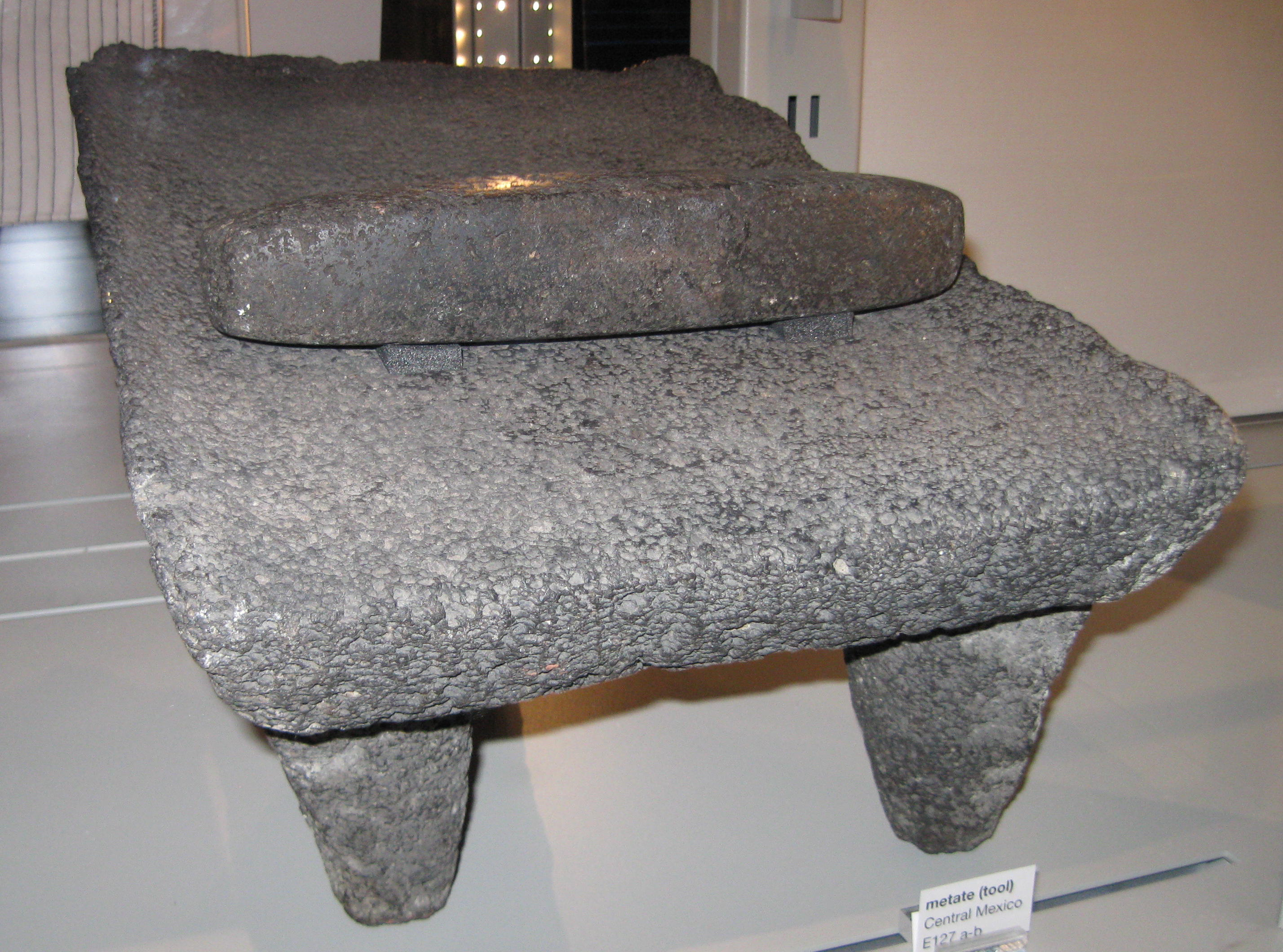
A native American grinder stone tool or "metate" from Central Mexico

Around 7000 BCE, the indigenous peoples of Mexico and Central America hunted game and gathered plants, including wild chili peppers. Corn was not yet cultivated, so one main source of calories was roasted agave hearts. By 1200 BCE, corn was domesticated and a process called nixtamalization, or treatment with alkali (lye prepared most frequently from plant ashes; the root of the Nahuatl word nixtamal itself is nextli, which means ash), was developed to soften corn for grinding and improve its nutritional value. This allowed the creation of tortillas and other kinds of flat breads. The indigenous peoples of Mesoamerica have numerous stories about the origin of corn, usually related to being a gift of one or more gods, such as Quetzalcoatl.

The other staple was beans, eaten with corn and some other plants as a complementary protein. Other protein sources included amaranth, domesticated turkey, insects such as grasshoppers, beetles and ant larvae, iguanas, and turtle eggs on the coastlines. Vegetables included squash and their seeds; chilacayote; jicama, a kind of tuber; and edible flowers, especially those of squash. The chili pepper was used as food, ritual and as medicine.

When the Spanish arrived, the Aztecs had sophisticated agricultural techniques and an abundance of food, which was the base of their economy. It allowed them to expand an empire, bringing in tribute which consisted mostly of foods the Aztecs could not grow themselves. According to Bernardino de Sahagún, the Nahua peoples of central Mexico ate corn, beans, turkey, fish, small game, insects and a wide variety of fruits, vegetables, pulses, seeds, tubers, wild mushrooms, plants and herbs that they collected or cultivated.

=== Modern period ===
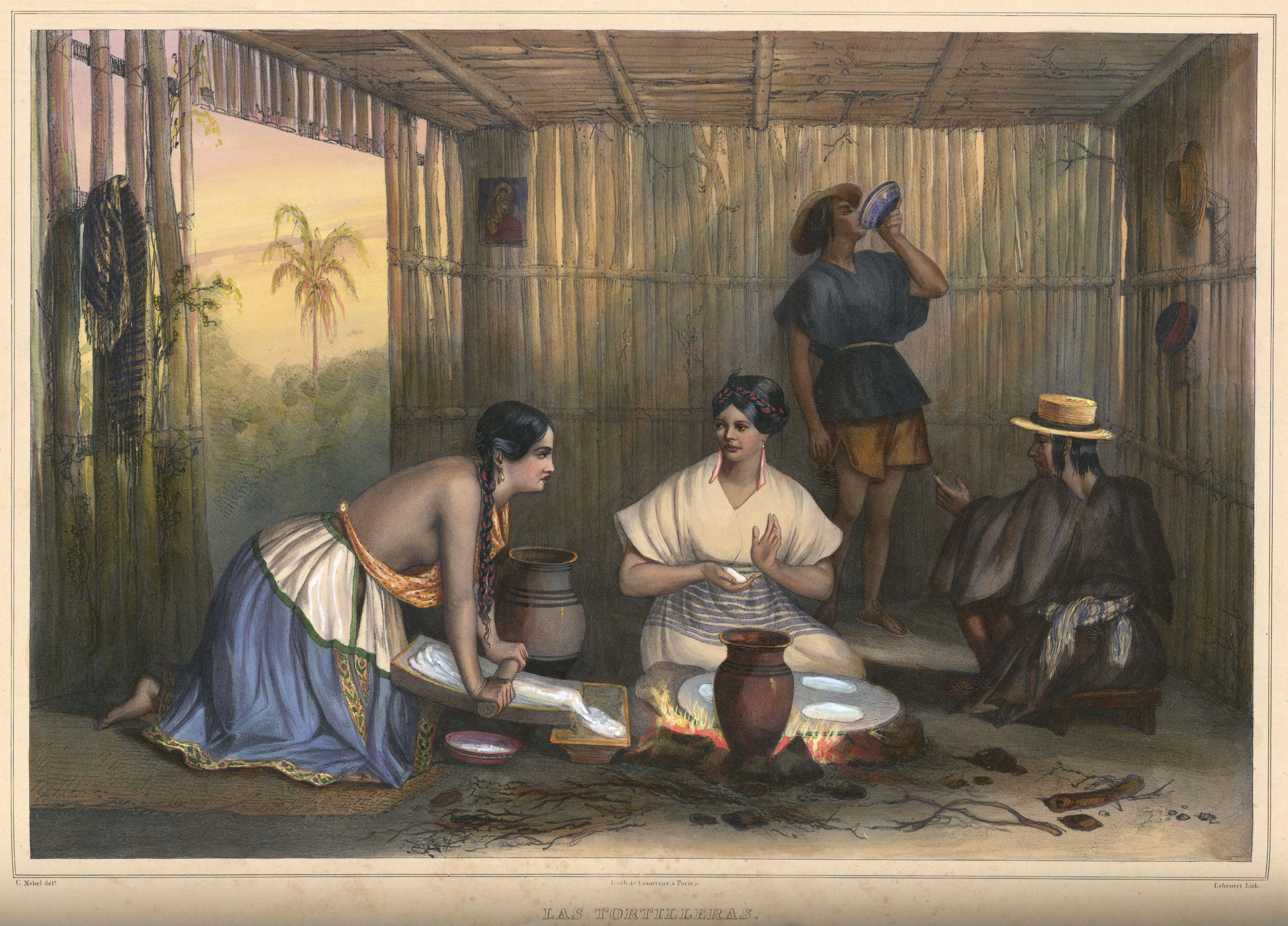
Las Tortilleras, an 1836 lithograph from a painting by Carl Nebel of women grinding corn and making tortillas

After the Conquest, the Spanish introduced a variety of foodstuffs and cooking techniques, like frying, to the New World. Regional cuisines remained varied, with native staples more prevalent in the rural southern areas and Spanish foods taking root in the more sparsely populated northern region. European style wheat bread was initially met unfavorably with Moctezuma's emissaries who reportedly described it as tasting of "dried maize stalks". On the Spanish side, Bernal Díaz del Castillo complained about the "maize cake" rations on campaign.

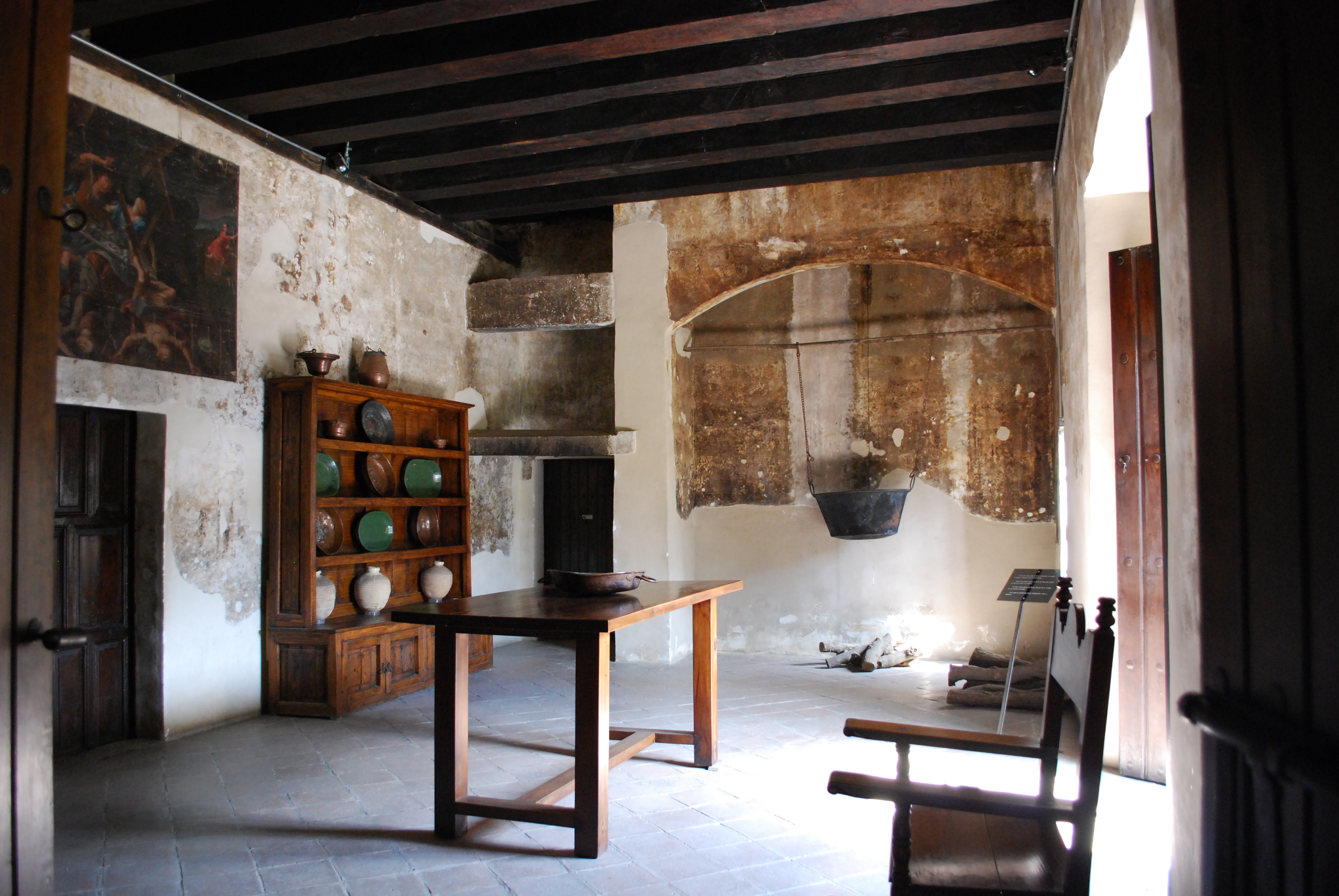
A reconstructed kitchen at the 16th century former monastery of San Miguel Arcángel, Huejotzingo, Puebla

The cuisine of Spain is a Mediterranean cuisine influenced by its Muslim Andalusian period, composed of a number of staples such as olive oil and rice. Spanish settlers introduced these staples to the region, although some continued to be imported, such as wine, brandy, nuts, olives, spices, and capers. They introduced domesticated animals, such as pigs, cows, chickens, goats, and sheep for meat and milk, raising the consumption of protein. Cheese became the most important dairy product.

The Spanish brought rice to Mexico, along with sugar cane, used extensively creation of many kinds of sweets, especially local fruits in syrup. A sugar-based candy craft called alfeñique was imported and is now used for the Day of the Dead. Over time ingredients like olive oil, rice, onions, garlic, oregano, coriander, cinnamon, and cloves became incorporated with native ingredients and cooking techniques. One of the main avenues for the mixing of the two cuisines was in convents.

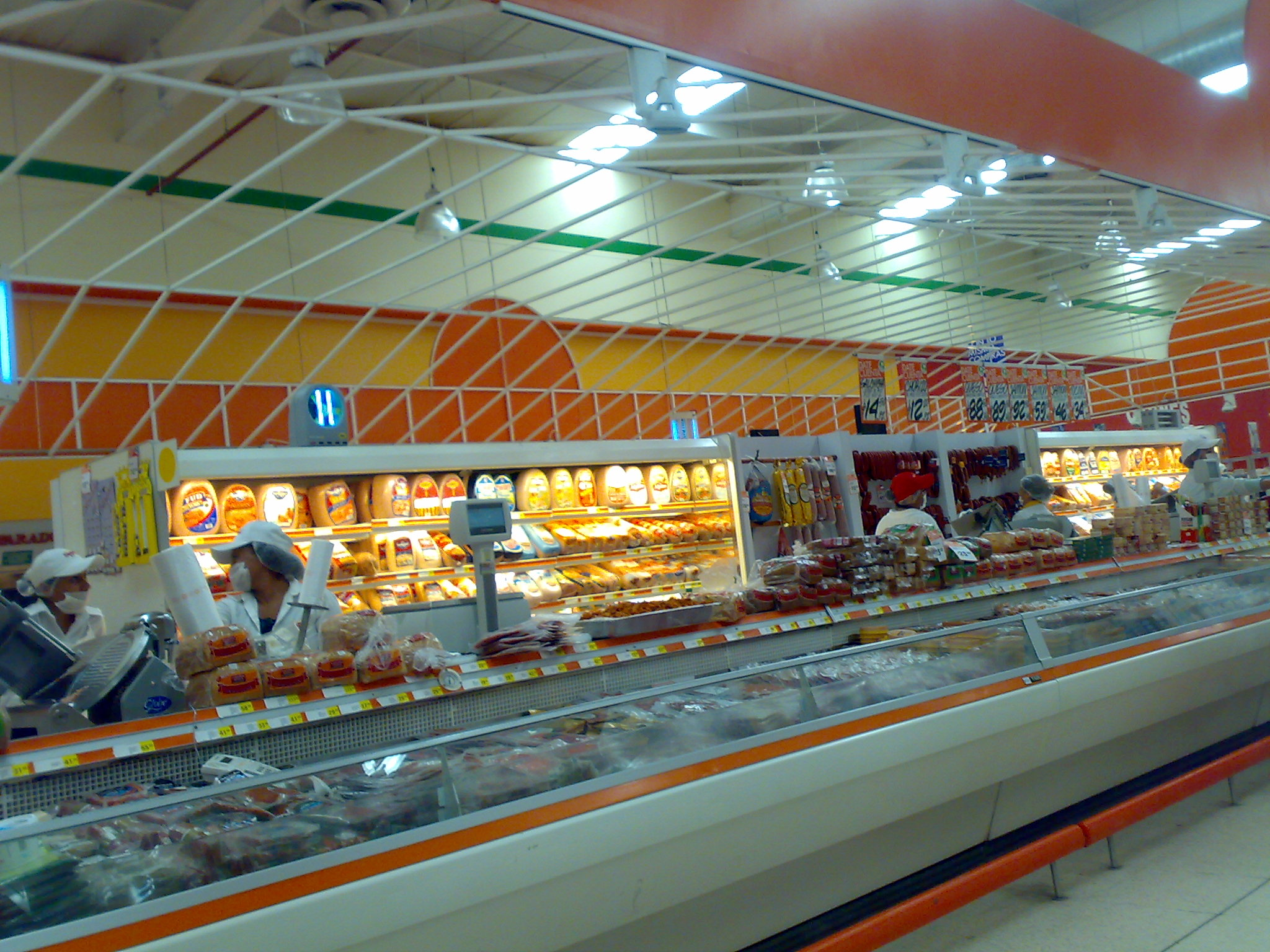
A typical Mexican supermarket

Despite the influence of Spanish culture, Mexican cuisine has maintained its base of corn, beans and chili peppers. Natives continued to be reliant on maize; it was less expensive than the wheat favored by European settlers, it was easier to cultivate and produced higher yields. European control over the land grew stronger with the founding of wheat farms. In 18th century Mexico City, wheat was baked into leaved rolls called pan francés or pan español, but only two bakers were allowed to bake this style of bread and they worked on consignment to the viceroy and the archbishop. Large ring loaves of choice flour known as pan floreado were available for wealthy "Creoles". Other styles of bread used lower-quality wheat and maize to produce pan común, pambazo and cemita.

Pozole is mentioned in the 16th century Florentine Codex by Bernardino de Sahagún.

In the eighteenth century, an Italian Capuchin friar, Ilarione da Bergamo, included descriptions of food in his travelogue. He noted that tortillas were eaten not only by the poor, but by the upper class as well. He described lunch fare as pork products like chorizo and ham being eaten between tortillas, with a piquant red chili sauce. For drink, pulque, as well as corn-based atole, and for those who could afford it, chocolate-based drinks were consumed twice a day. According to de Bergamo's account neither coffee nor wine are consumed, and evening meals ended with a small portion of beans in a thick soup instead, "served to set the stage for drinking water".

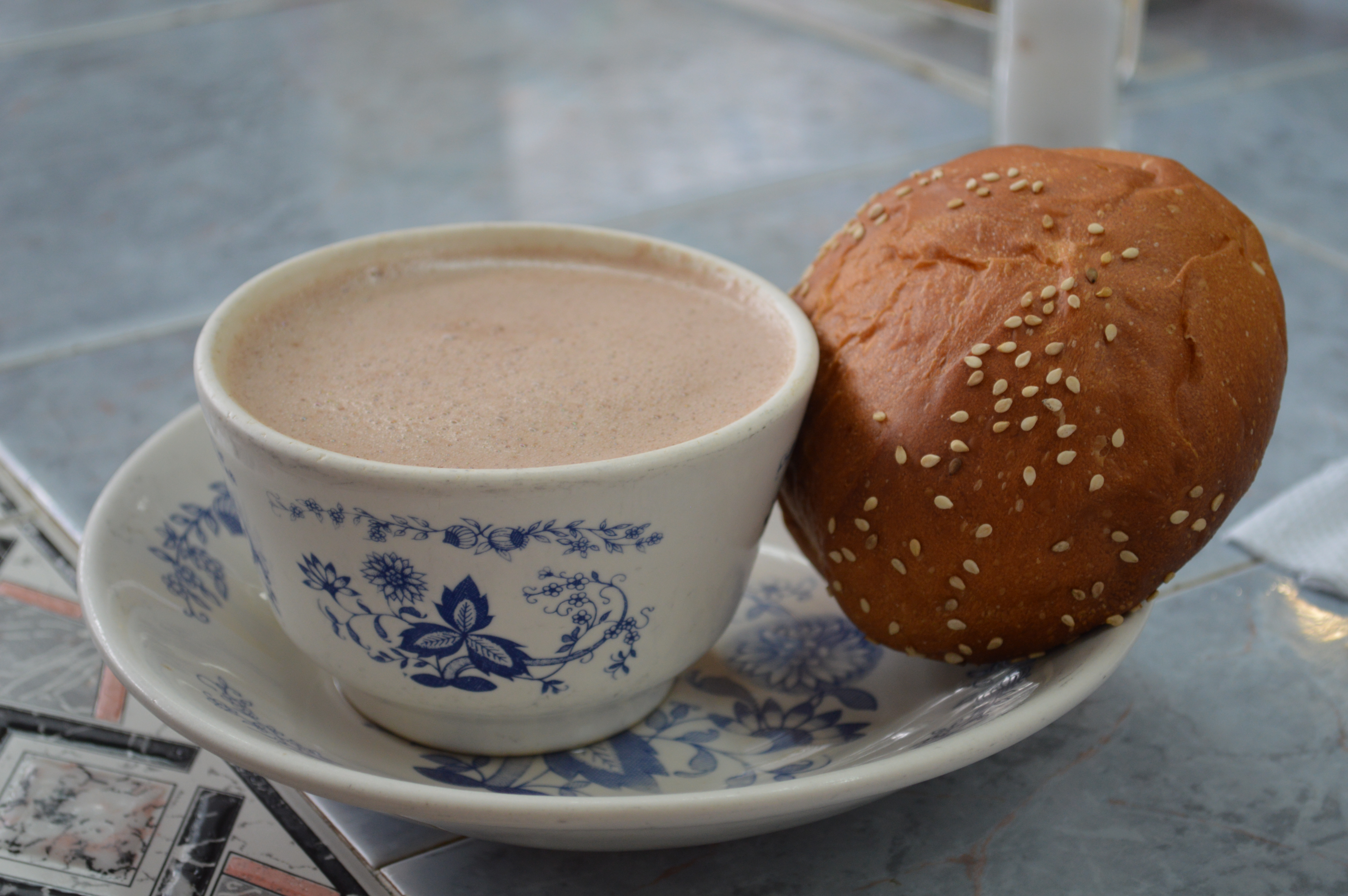
Hot chocolate and pan dulce are the quintessential breakfast in Mexico. Many of Mexico's sweet breads were influenced by French immigrants.

During the 19th century, Mexico experienced an influx of various immigrants, including French, Lebanese, German, Chinese and Italian, which have had some effect on the food. During the French intervention in Mexico, French food became popular with the upper classes. An influence on these new trends came from chef Tudor, who was brought to Mexico by the Emperor Maximilian of Habsburg. One lasting evidence of this is the variety of breads and sweet breads, such as bolillos, conchas and much more, which can be found in Mexican bakeries. The Germans brought beer brewing techniques and the Chinese added their cuisine to certain areas of the country. This led to Mexico characterizing its cuisine more by its relation to popular traditions rather than on particular cooking techniques.

Since the 20th century, there has been an interchange of food influences between Mexico and the United States. Mexican cooking was of course still practiced in what is now the Southwest United States after the Mexican–American War, but Diana Kennedy, in her book The Cuisines of Mexico (published in 1972), drew a sharp distinction between Mexican food and Tex-Mex.

Tex-Mex food was developed from Mexican and Anglo influences, and was traced to the late 19th century in Texas. It still continues to develop with flour tortillas becoming popular north of the border only in the latter 20th century. From north to south, much of the influence has been related to food industrialization, as well as the greater availability overall of food, especially after the Mexican Revolution. One other very visible sign of influence from the United States is the appearance of fast foods, such as hamburgers, hot dogs and pizza.

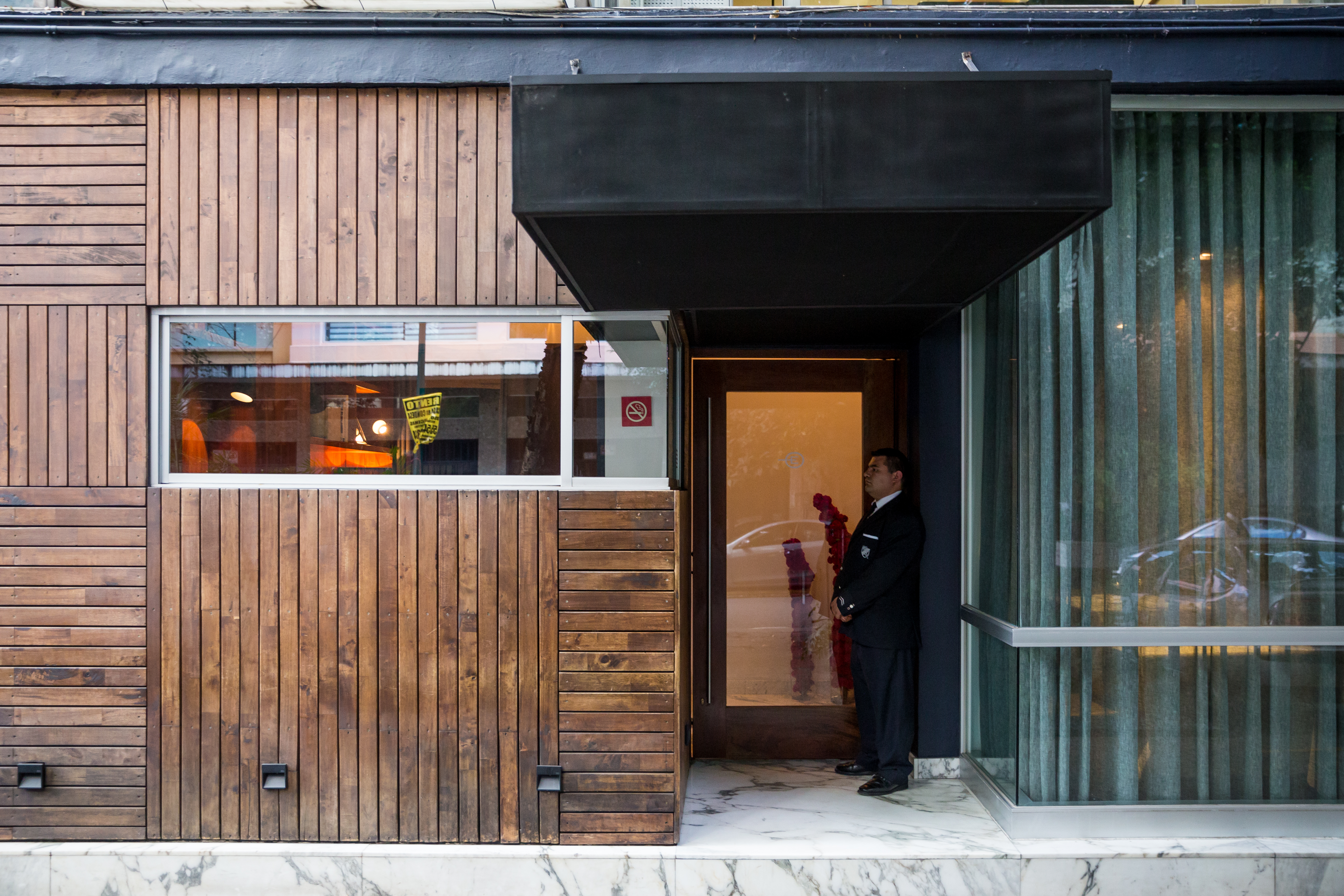
Pujol was named by The Wall Street Journal as the best in Mexico City.

In the latter 20th century, international influence in Mexico has led to interest and development of haute cuisine. In Mexico, many professional chefs are trained in French or international cuisine, but the use of Mexican staples and flavors is still favored, including the simple foods of traditional markets. It is not unusual to see some quesadillas or small tacos among the other hors d'oeuvres at fancy dinner parties in Mexico.

Professional cookery in Mexico is growing and includes an emphasis on traditional methods and ingredients. In the cities, there is interest in publishing and preserving what is authentic Mexican food. This movement is traceable to 1982 with the Mexican Culinary Circle of Mexico City. It was created by a group of women chefs and other culinary experts as a reaction to the fear of traditions being lost with the increasing introduction of foreign techniques and foods. In 2010, Mexico's cuisine was recognized by UNESCO as an Intangible Cultural Heritage of Humanity.

In contemporary times, various world cuisines have become popular in Mexico, thus adopting a Mexican fusion. For example, sushi in Mexico is often made by using a variety of sauces based on mango and tamarind, and very often served with serrano-chili blended soy sauce, or complemented with vinegar, habanero peppers, and chipotle peppers.

== Beverages ==
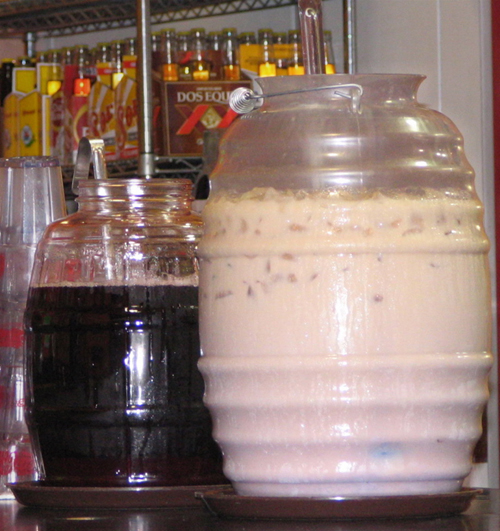
Two large jars of aguas frescas. On the left is filled with jamaica and on the right is with horchata.

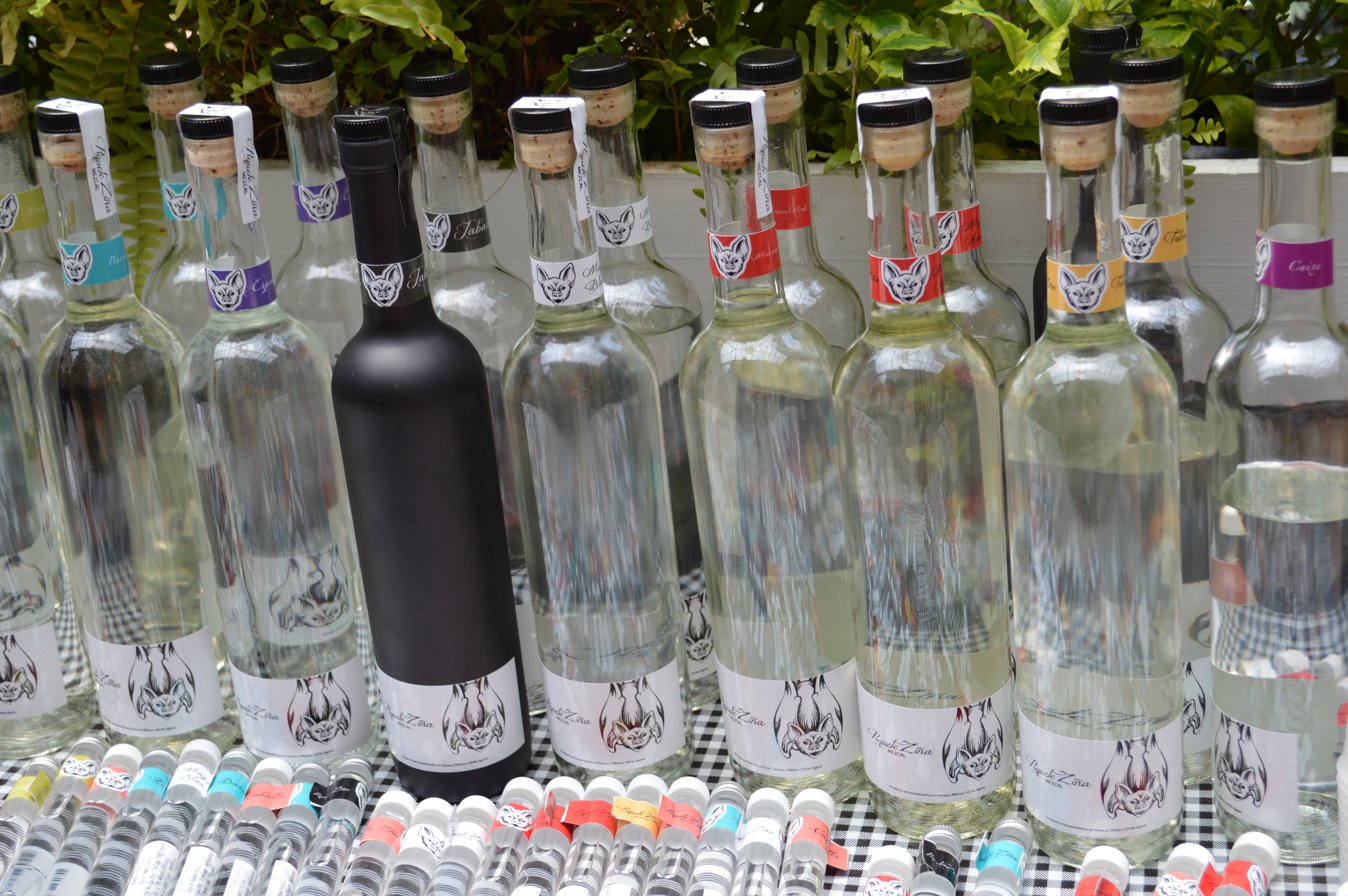
Bottles of artisanal mezcal. Tequila is differentiated from mezcal by its complicated production and its protected designation of origin.

Corn in Mexico is not only eaten, but also drunk as a beverage. Corn is the base of a hot drink called atole, which is then flavored with fruit, chocolate, rice or other flavors. Fermented corn is the base of a cold drink, which goes by different names and varieties, such as tejuino, pozol and others. Aguas frescas are flavored drinks usually made from fruit, water and sugar. Beverages also include hibiscus iced tea, one made from tamarind and one from rice called horchata. One variant of coffee is café de olla, which is coffee brewed with cinnamon and raw sugar. Many of the most popular beverages can be found sold by street vendors and juice bars in Mexico.

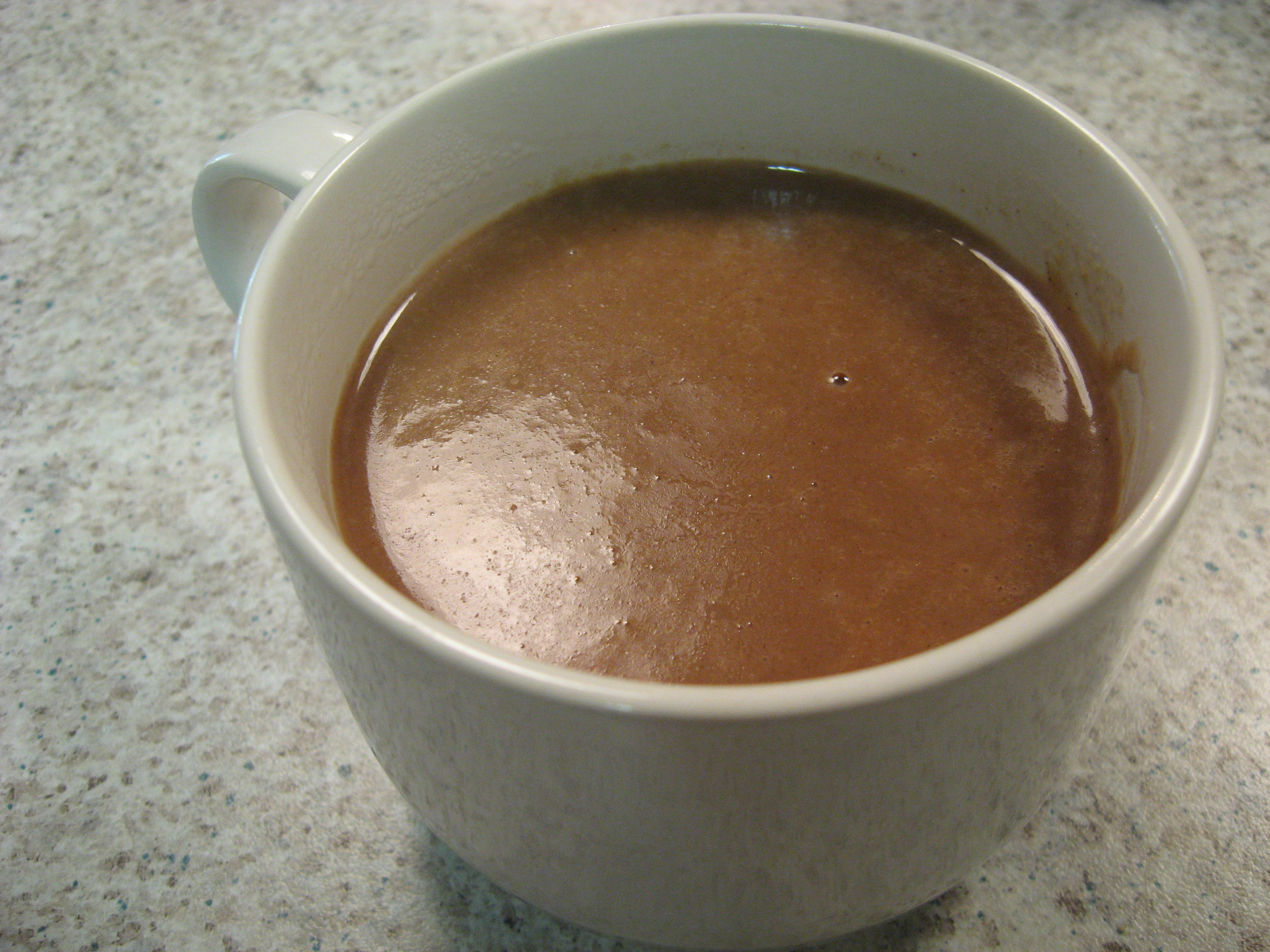
Champurrado, Mexican chocolate-based drink

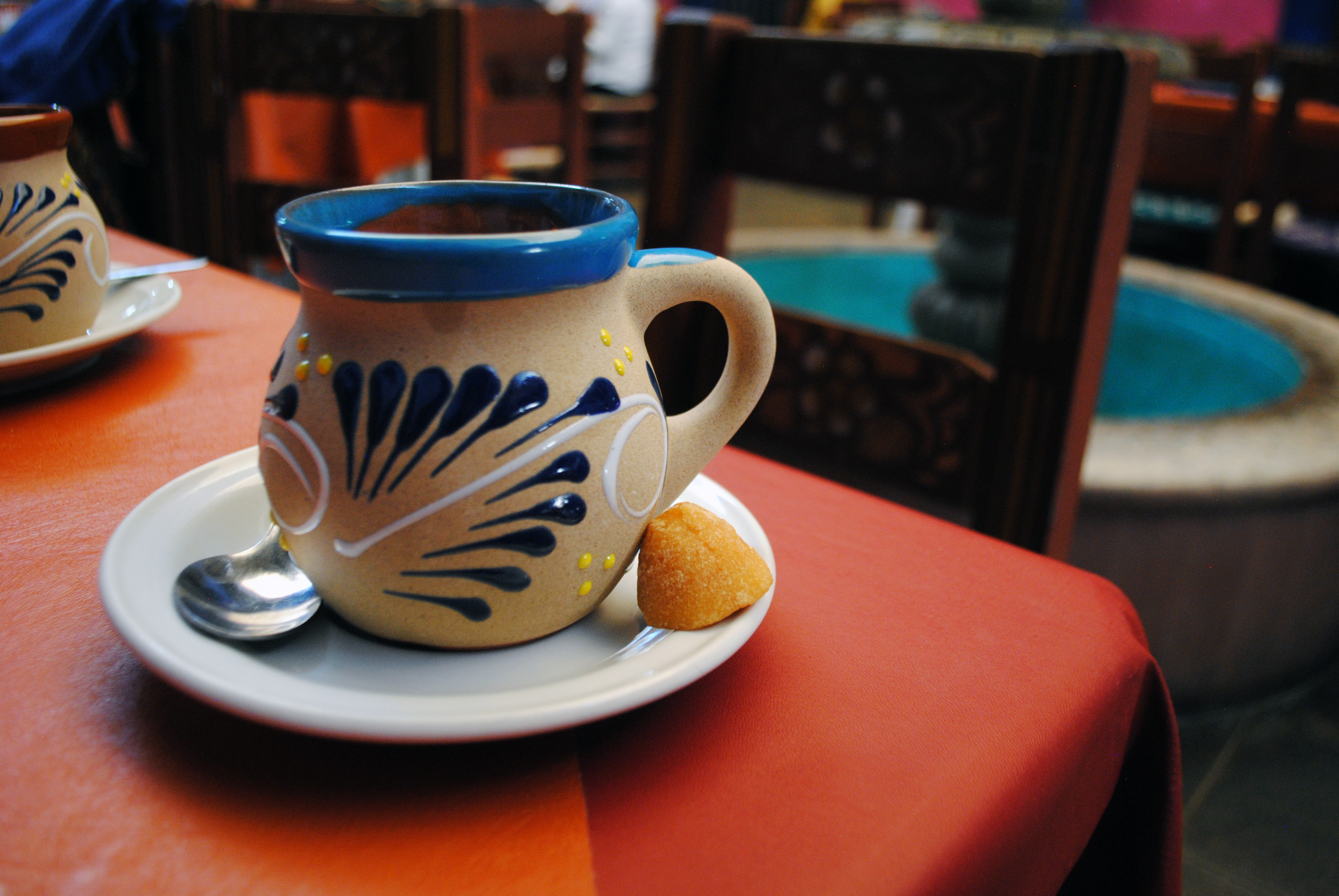
Café de olla, Mexican spiced coffee sweetened with piloncillo.

Chocolate played an important part in the history of Mexican cuisine. The word "chocolate" originated from Mexico's Aztec cuisine, derived from the Nahuatl word xocolatl. Chocolate was first drunk rather than eaten. It was also used for religious rituals. The Maya civilization grew cacao trees and used the cacao seeds it produced to make a frothy, bitter drink. The drink, called xocoatl, was often flavored with vanilla, chile pepper, and achiote. Tejate is another Mexican beverage made from cacao. Coffee is also popular in Mexico; Café de olla is a traditional preparation of coffee with cinnamon and piloncillo.

Alcoholic beverages from Mexico include tequila, pulque, aguardiente, mezcal and charanda. wine, rum and beer are also produced. The most common alcoholic beverage consumed with food in Mexico is beer, followed by tequila. A classic margarita, an internationally popular cocktail, is composed of tequila, triple sec and lime juice. The paloma is also prepared with tequila; it may be prepared as a highball of tequila and grapefruit-flavored soda or as a Collins of tequila, grapefruit juice, and sparkling water.

Rompope is believed to have been originally made in the convents of the city of Puebla, Mexico. The word rompope is a derivation of the word rompon, which is used to describe the Spanish version of eggnog that came to Mexico.

A popular soft drink from Mexico is Sangria Señorial a sangria-flavored, non-alcoholic beverage. Sangria is a Spanish drink that was introduced by Spaniards, as was Horchata and Agua de Jamaica.

== Regional cuisines ==
=== Chiapas ===
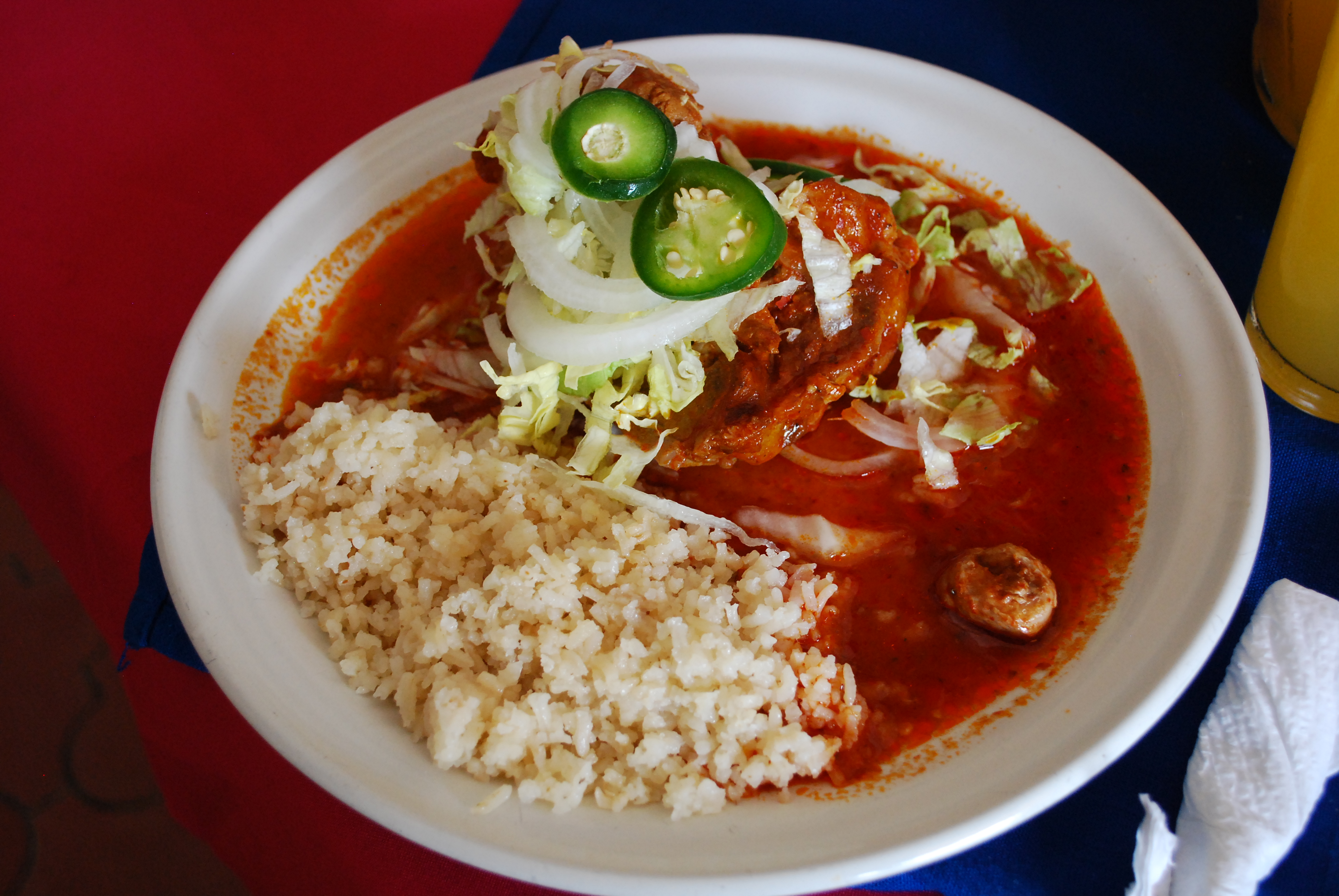
Cochito, a dish exclusive to Chiapas

Similar to other regions in Mexico, corn is a dietary staple and other indigenous foods remain strong in the cuisine as well. Along with a chile called simojovel, used nowhere else in the country, the cuisine is also distinguished by the use of herbs, such as chipilín and hierba santa. Like in Oaxaca, tamales are usually wrapped in banana leaves (or sometimes with the leaves of hoja santa), but often chipilín is incorporated into the dough. As in the Yucatán Peninsula, boiled corn is drunk as a beverage called pozol, but here it is usually flavored with cacao. Another beverage (which can be served hot or cold) typical from this region is Tascalate, which is made of powdered maize, cocoa beans, achiote (annatto), chilies, pine nuts and cinnamon.

The favored meats are beef, pork and chicken (introduced by the Spanish), especially in the highlands, which favors the raising of livestock. The livestock industry has also prompted the making of cheese, mostly done on ranches and in small cooperatives, with the best known from Ocosingo, Rayón and Pijijiapan. Meat and cheese dishes are frequently accompanied by vegetables, such as squash, chayote, and carrots.

=== Mexico City ===
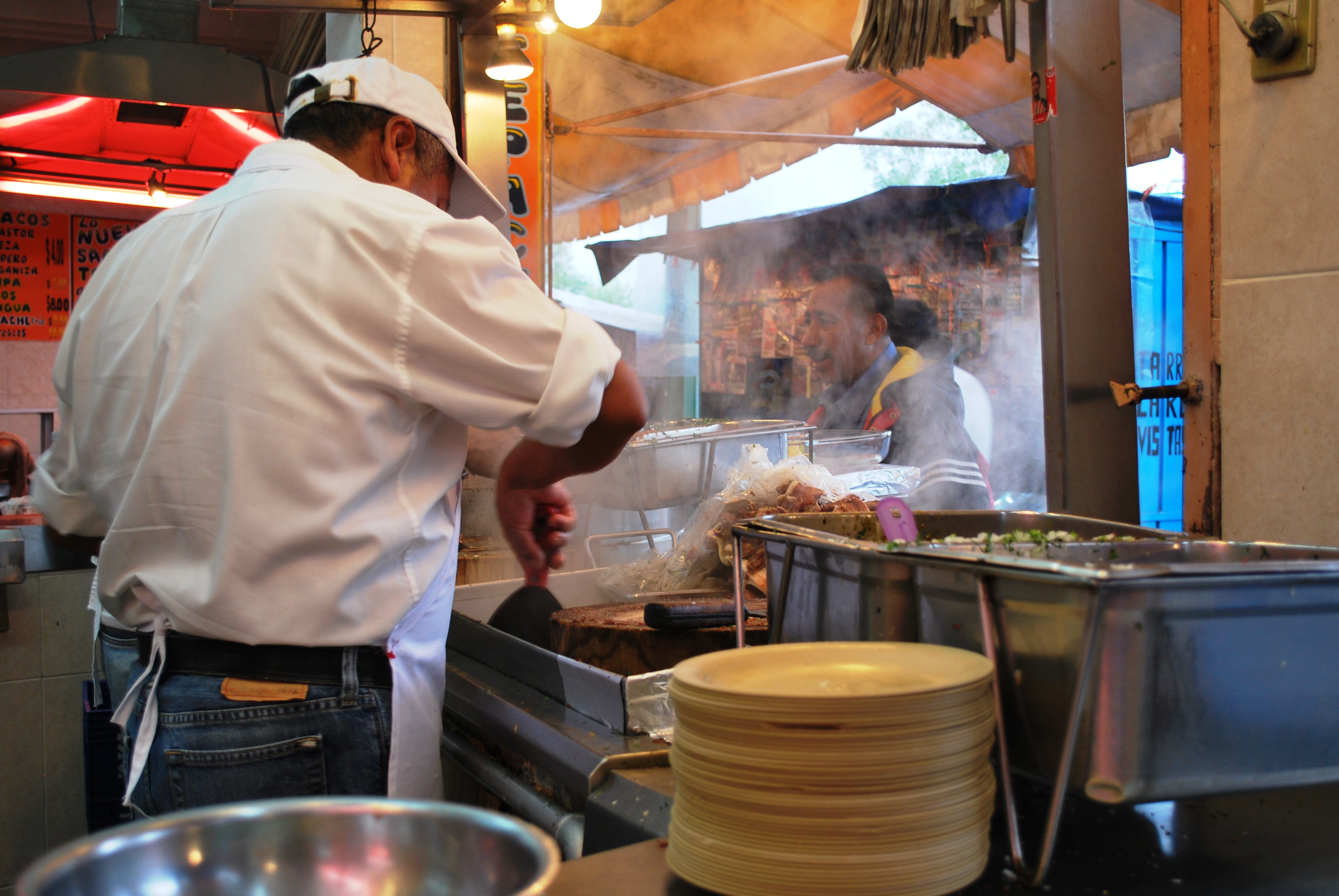
A taco stand in the Tacubaya neighborhood of Mexico City, Tacos al pastor are a staple of Mexico City's street food.

Mexico City cuisine has been influenced by the cuisines of the other regions of Mexico, as well as a number of foreign influences. This is because Mexico City has been a center for migration of people from all over Mexico since pre-Hispanic times. Most of the ingredients of this area's cooking are not grown in situ, but transported from all over the country (for example, tropical fruits).

Street cuisine is very popular, with taco stands and lunch counters on every street. Popular foods in the city include barbacoa (a specialty of the central highlands), birria (from western Mexico), cabrito (from the north), carnitas (originally from Michoacán), mole sauces (from Puebla and central Mexico), tacos with many different fillings, and large submarine-like sandwiches called tortas, usually served at specialized shops called torterías. This is also the area where most of Mexico's haute cuisine can be found. Some restaurants specialize in pre-Hispanic food, including dishes with insects.

=== Northern Mexico ===
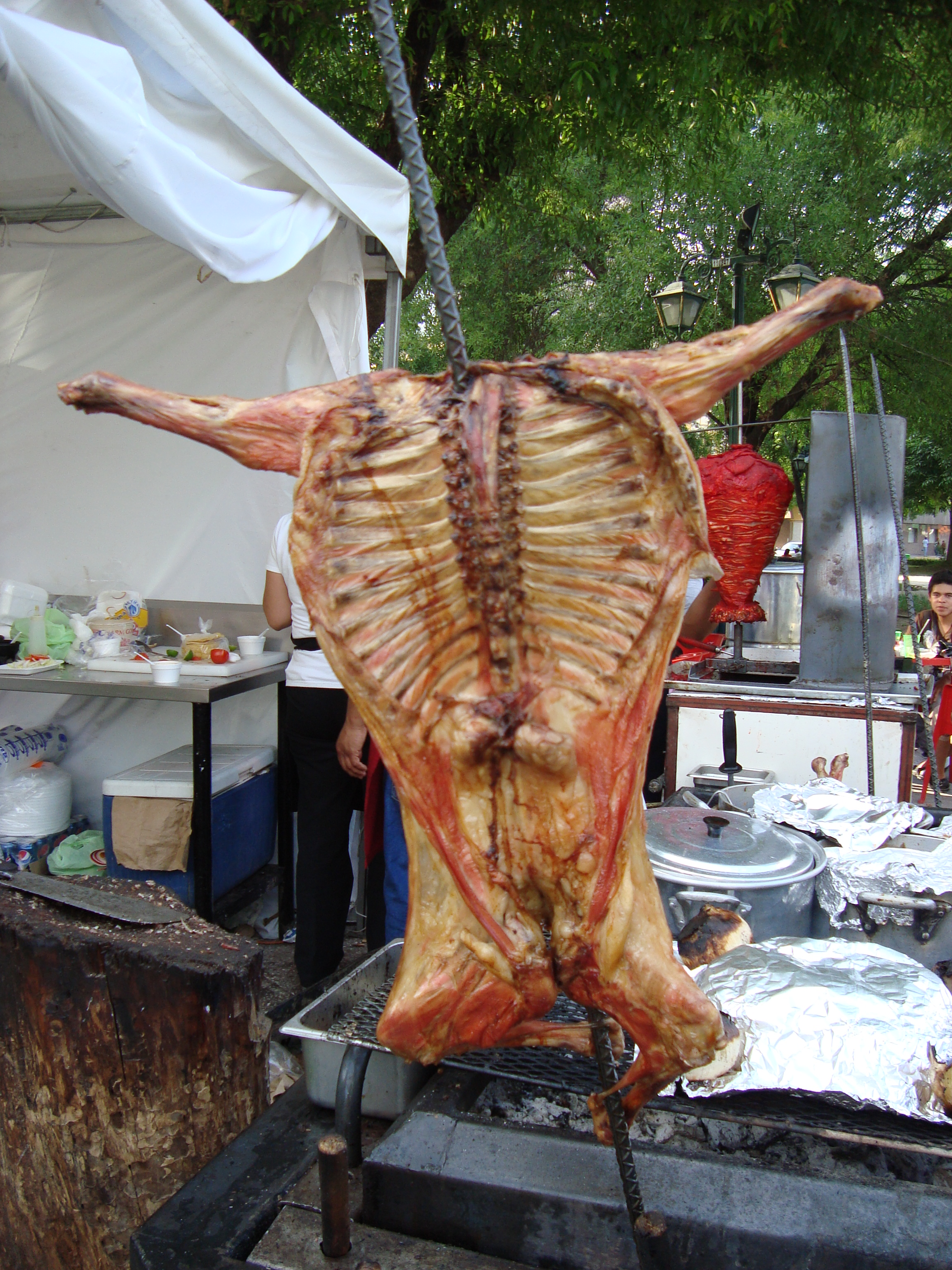
A cabrito (goat) on a spit in Monterrey, Nuevo León

The foods eaten in what is now the north of Mexico have differed from those in the south since the pre-Hispanic era. Here, the indigenous people were hunter-gatherers with limited agriculture and settlements because of the arid land.

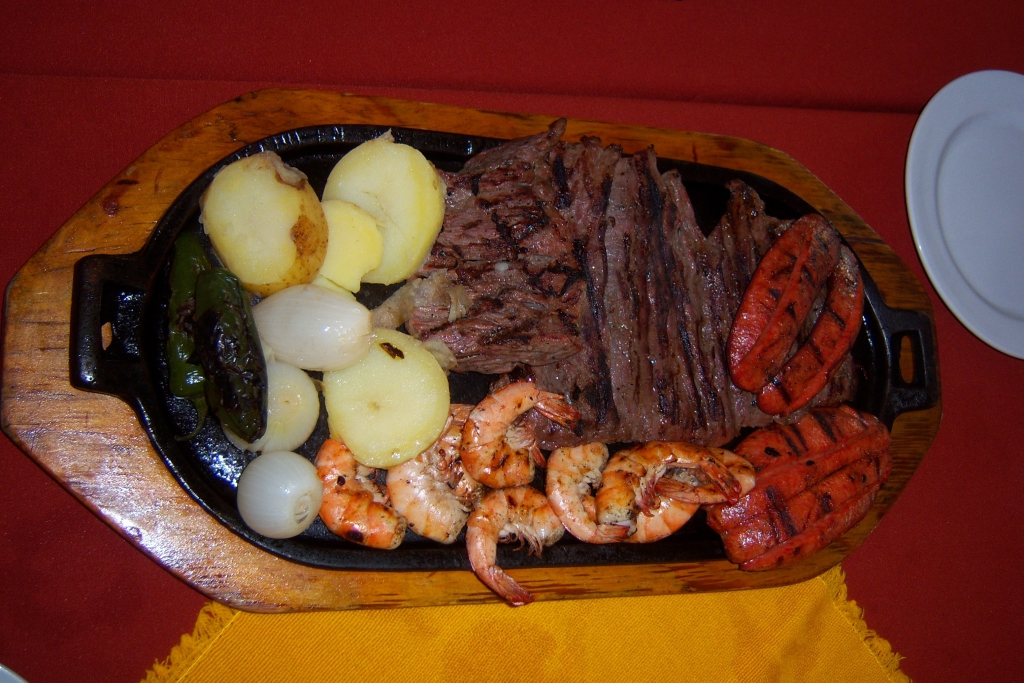
Grilled arrachera, shrimp, sausage, onions, potatoes and chiles toreados served on an iron skillet

When the Europeans arrived, they found much of the land in this area suitable for raising cattle, goats and sheep. This led to the dominance of meat, especially beef, in the region, and some of the most popular dishes include machaca, arrachera and cabrito. The region's distinctive cooking technique is grilling, as ranch culture has promoted outdoor cooking done by men.

The ranch culture has also prompted cheese production and the north produces the widest varieties of cheese in Mexico. These include queso fresco (fresh farmer's cheese), ranchero (similar to Monterey Jack), cuajada (a mildly sweet, creamy curd of fresh milk), requesón (similar to cottage cheese or ricotta), Chihuahua's creamy semi-soft queso menonita, and fifty-six varieties of asadero (smoked cheese).

Another important aspect of northern cuisine is the presence of wheat, especially in the use of flour tortillas. The area has at least forty different types of flour tortillas. The main reason for this is that much of the land supports wheat production, introduced by the Spanish. These large tortillas allowed for the creation of burritos in the border city of Ciudad Juárez, which eventually gained popularity in the Southwest United States.

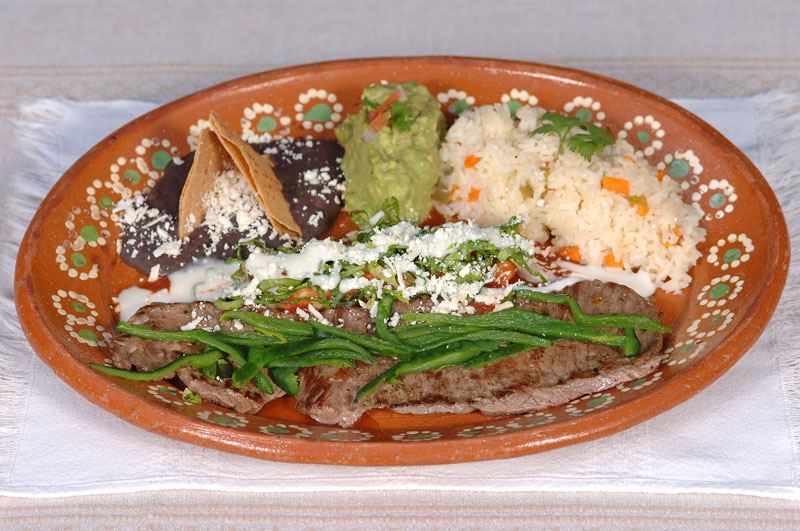
Carne a la tampiqueña

The variety of foodstuffs in the north is not as varied as in the south of Mexico, because of the mostly desert climate. Much of the cuisine of this area is dependent on food preservation techniques, namely dehydration and canning. Dried foods include meat, chiles, squash, peas, corn, lentils, beans and dried fruit. A number of these are also canned. Preservation techniques change the flavor of foods; for example, many chiles are less hot after drying.

In Northeastern Mexico, during the Spanish colonial period, Nuevo León was founded and settled by Spanish families of Jewish origin (Crypto-Jews). They contributed to the regional cuisine with dishes, such as pan de semita or "Semitic bread" (a type of bread made without leavening), and cabrito or baby goat, which is the typical food of Monterrey and the state of Nuevo León, as well as some regions of Coahuila.

The north has seen waves of immigration by the Chinese, Mormons, and Mennonites, who have influenced the cuisines in areas, such as Chihuahua and Baja California. Most recently, Baja Med cuisine has emerged in Ensenada and elsewhere in Baja California, combining Mexican and Mediterranean flavors.

=== Oaxaca ===
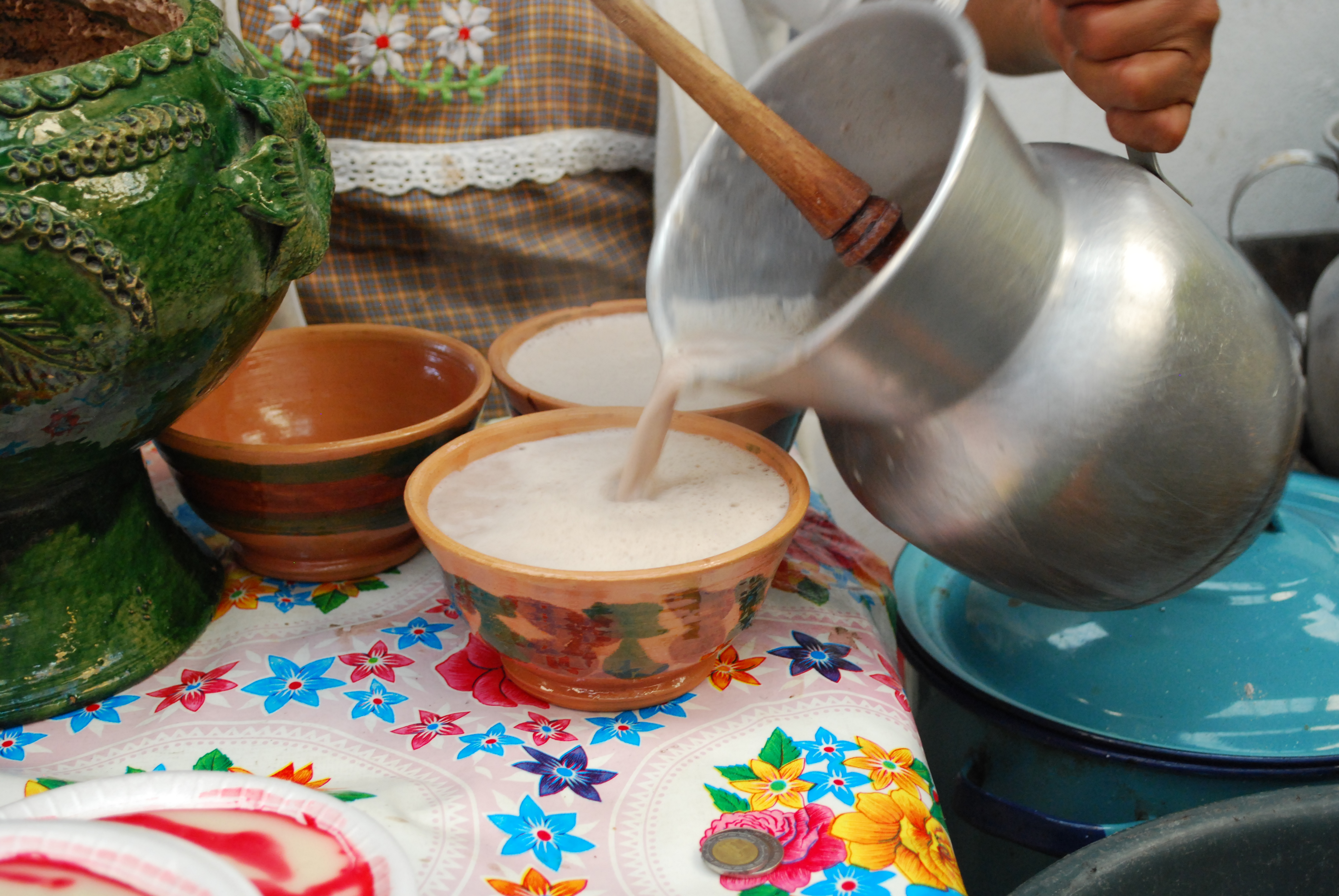
Chocolate being poured at a market at Villa de Etla, Oaxaca

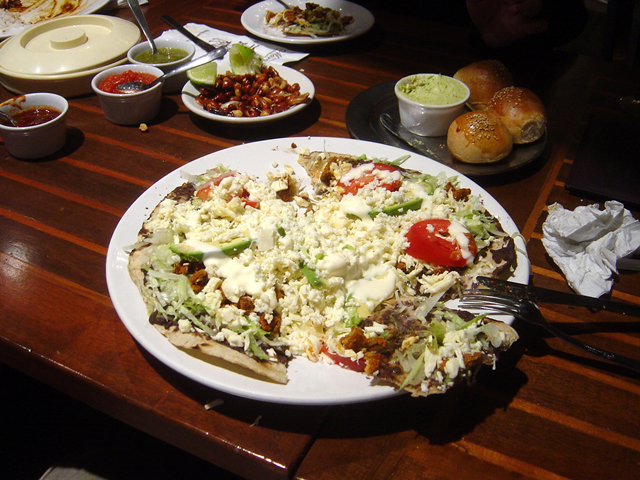
Tlayuda

The cooking of Oaxaca remained more intact after the conquest, as the Spanish took the area with less fighting and less disruption of the economy and food production systems. However, it was the first area to experience the mixing of foods and cooking styles, while central Mexico was still recuperating. Despite its size, the state has a wide variety of ecosystems and a wide variety of native foods. Vegetables are grown in the central valley, seafood is abundant on the coast and the area bordering Veracruz grows tropical fruits.

Much of the state's cooking is influenced by that of the Mixtec and, to a lesser extent, the Zapotec. Later in the colonial period, Oaxaca lost its position as a major food supplier and the area's cooking returned to a more indigenous style, keeping only a small number of foodstuffs, such as chicken and pork. It also adapted mozzarella, brought by the Spanish, and modified it to what is now known as Oaxaca cheese.

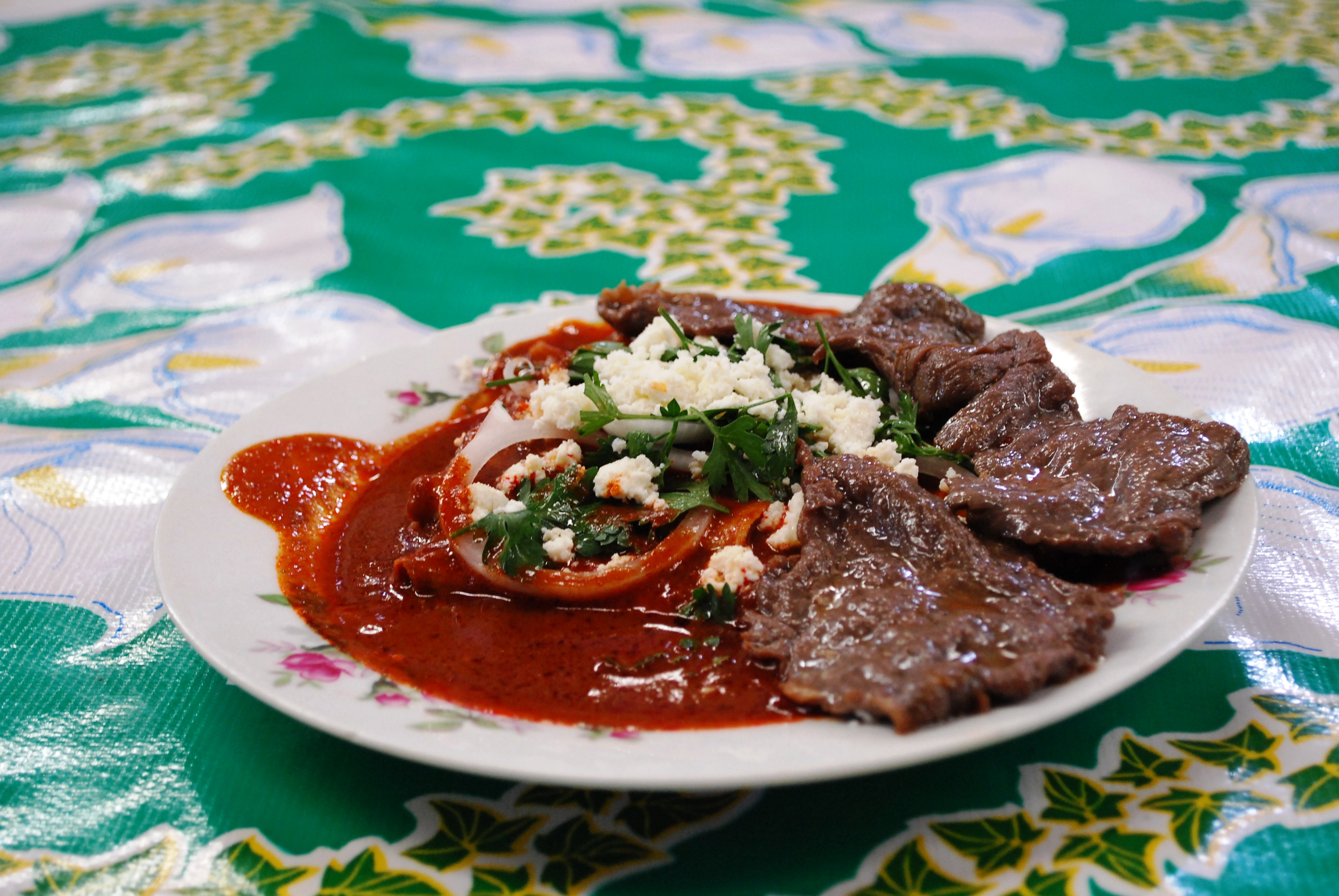
Enchiladas with tasajo beef

One major feature of Oaxacan cuisine is its seven mole varieties, second only to mole poblano in popularity. The seven are negro (black), amarillo (yellow), coloradito ("little red"), mancha manteles ("tablecloth stainer"), chichilo ("smoky stew"), rojo (red), and verde (green).

Corn is the staple food in the region. Tortillas are called blandas and are a part of every meal. Corn is also used to make empanadas, tamales and more. Black beans are favored, often served in soup or as a sauce for enfrijoladas. Oaxaca's regional chile peppers include pasilla oaxaqueña (red, hot and smoky), along with amarillos (yellow), chilhuacles, chilcostles and costeños. These, along with herbs, such as hoja santa, give the food its unique taste.

Another important aspect of Oaxacan cuisine is chocolate, generally consumed as a beverage. It is frequently hand-ground and combined with almonds, cinnamon and other ingredients.

=== Durango ===
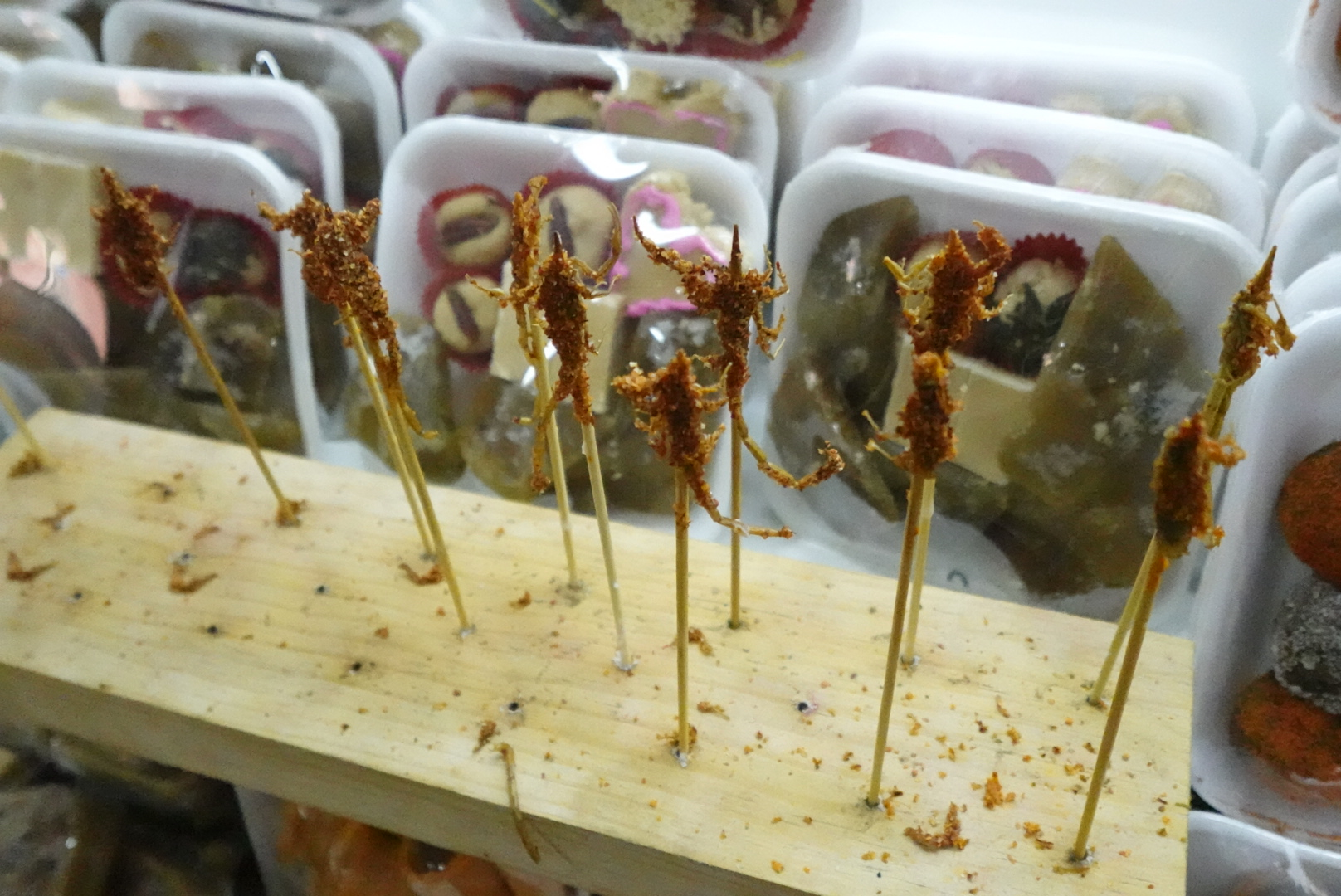
Durango scorpion on a skewer bathed in tajín, Victoria de Durango

The caldillo duranguense is a typical dish in Durango, and in the north of the country, it is a beef broth with chili pepper and sauces, another typical dish is the scorpion (Centruroides suffusus and Centruroides vittatus) either in taco, skewer, lollipops, or even, drowned in mezcal. The sting of the Durango scorpion can pose a serious health risk and requires medical attention.

=== Veracruz ===
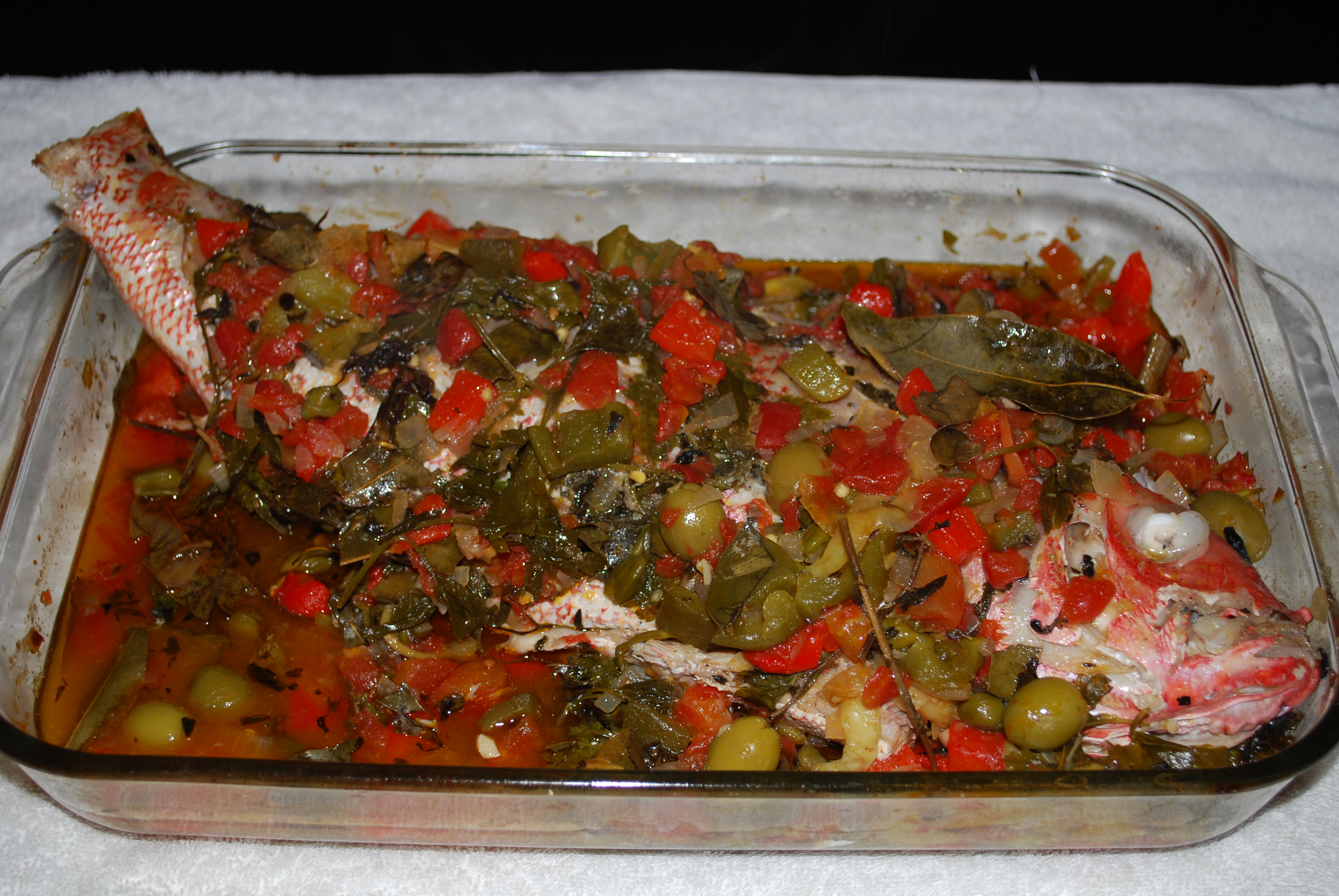
Huachinango a la veracruzana, a dish based on red snapper

The cuisine of Veracruz is a mix of indigenous, Afro-Mexican and Spanish. The indigenous contribution is in the use of corn as a staple, as well as vanilla (native to the state) and herbs called acuyo and hoja santa. It is also supplemented by a wide variety of tropical fruits, such as papaya, mamey and zapote, along with the introduction of citrus fruit and pineapple by the Spanish. The Spanish also introduced European herbs, such as parsley, thyme, marjoram, bay laurel, cilantro and others, which characterize much of the state's cooking. They are found in the best-known dish of the region, huachinango a la veracruzana, a red snapper dish. Plantain was introduced by African slaves.

The African influence is from the importation of slaves through the Caribbean, who brought foods with them, which had been introduced earlier to Africa by the Portuguese. As it borders the Gulf coast, seafood figures prominently in most of the state. The state's role as a gateway to Mexico has meant that the dietary staple of corn is less evident than in other parts of Mexico, with rice as a heavy favorite. Corn dishes include garnachas (a kind of corn cake), which are readily available especially in the mountain areas, where indigenous influence is strongest.

Anthropologist and restaurateur Raquel Torres Cerdán has worked to preserve and record many of the foods of the indigenous peoples of the region.

=== Western Mexico ===
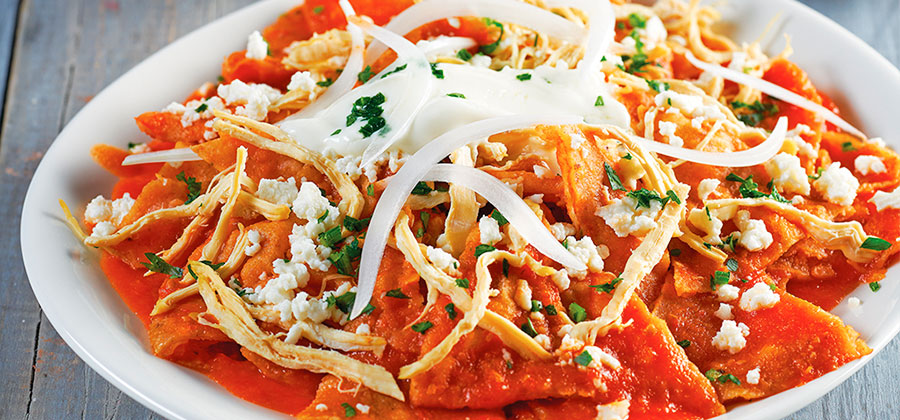
Chilaquiles

West of Mexico City is the Pacific coast and the states of Michoacán, Jalisco and Colima. The cuisine of Michoacan is based on the Purepecha culture which still dominates most of the state. The area has a large network of rivers and lakes providing fish. Its use of corn is perhaps the most varied. While atole is drunk in most parts of Mexico, it is made with more different flavors in Michoacán, including blackberry, cascabel chili and more. Tamales come in different shapes, wrapped in corn husks. These include those folded into polyhedrons called corundas and can vary in name if the filling is different. In the Bajío area, tamales are often served with a meat stew called churipo, which is flavored with cactus fruit.

The main Spanish contributions to Michoacán cuisine are rice, pork and spices. One of the best-known dishes from the state is morisquesta, which is a sausage and rice dish, closely followed by carnitas, which is deep-fried (confit technique) pork. The latter can be found in many parts of Mexico, often claimed to be authentically Michoacán. Other important ingredients in the cuisine include wheat (where bread symbolizes fertility) found in breads and pastries. Another is sugar, giving rise to a wide variety of desserts and sweets, such as fruit jellies and ice cream, mostly associated with the town of Tocumbo. The town of Cotija has a cheese named after it. The local alcoholic beverage is charanda, which is made with fermented sugar cane.

The cuisine of the states of Jalisco and Colima is noted for dishes such as birria, chilayo, menudo, and pork dishes. Jalisco's cuisine is known for tequila, with the liquor produced only in certain areas allowed to use the name. The cultural and gastronomic center of the area is Guadalajara, an area where both agriculture and cattle raising have thrived. The best-known dish from the area is birria, a stew of goat, beef, mutton, or pork, with chiles and spices.

An important street food is tortas ahogadas, where the torta (sandwich) is drowned in a chile sauce. Near Guadalajara is the town of Tonalá, known for its pozole, a hominy stew that was reportedly said in the 16th century to have been originally created with human flesh for ritual use. The area which makes tequila surrounds the city. A popular local drink is tejuino, made from fermented corn. Bionico is also a popular dessert in the Guadalajara area.

On the Pacific coast, seafood is common, generally cooked with European spices along with chile, and is often served with a spicy salsa. Favored fish varieties include marlin, swordfish, snapper, tuna, shrimp and octopus. Tropical fruits are also important. The cuisine of the Baja California Peninsula is especially heavy on seafood, with the widest variety. It also features a mild green chile pepper, as well as dates, especially in sweets.

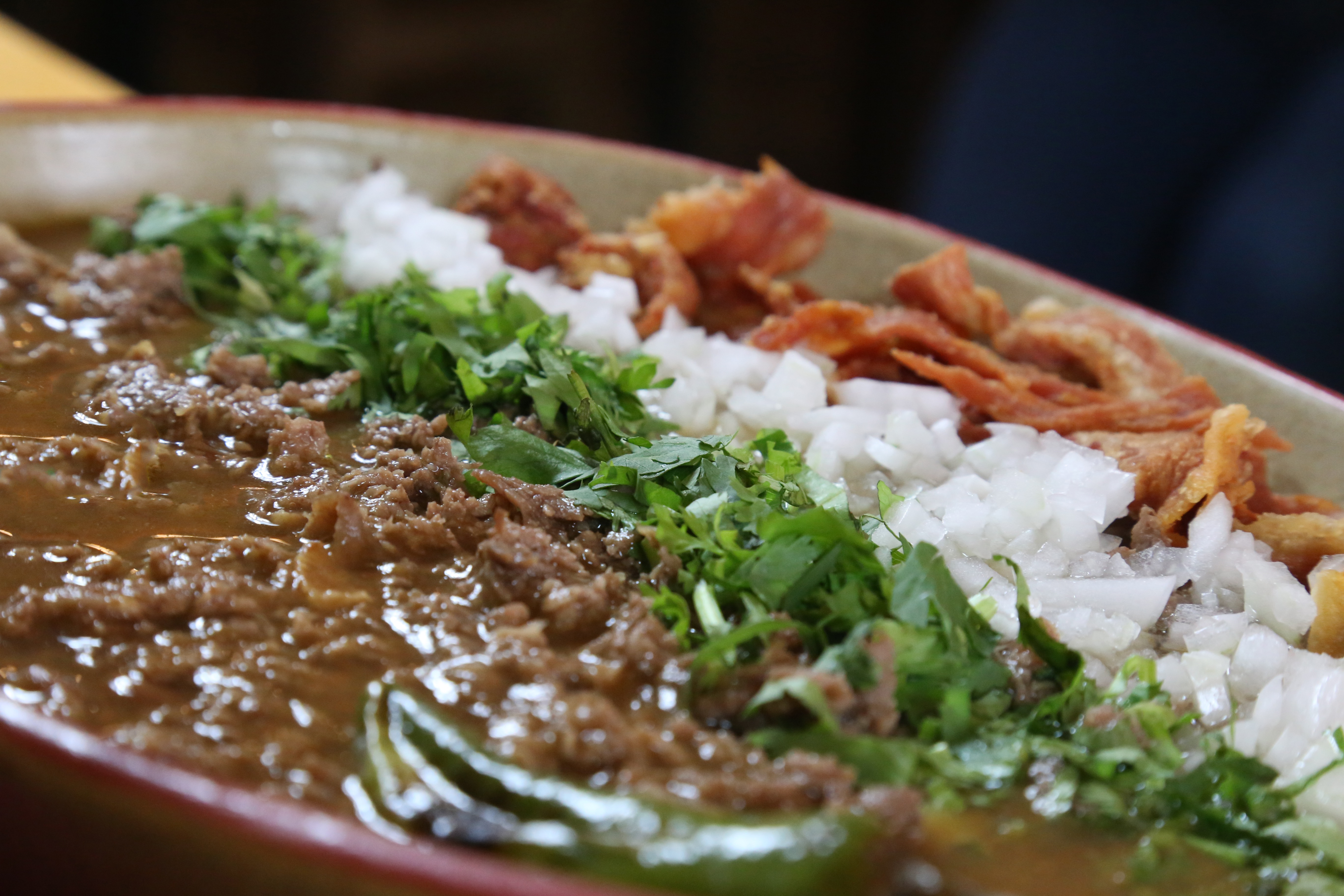
Carne en su jugo

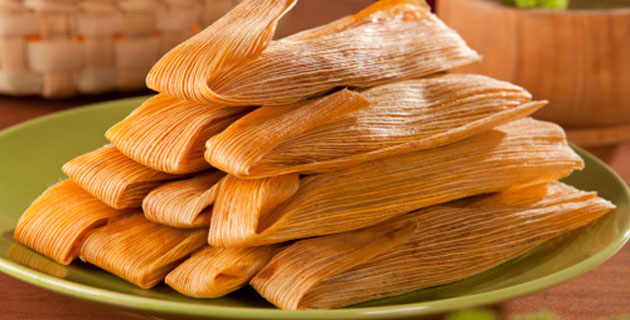
Tamales wrapped in corn husks

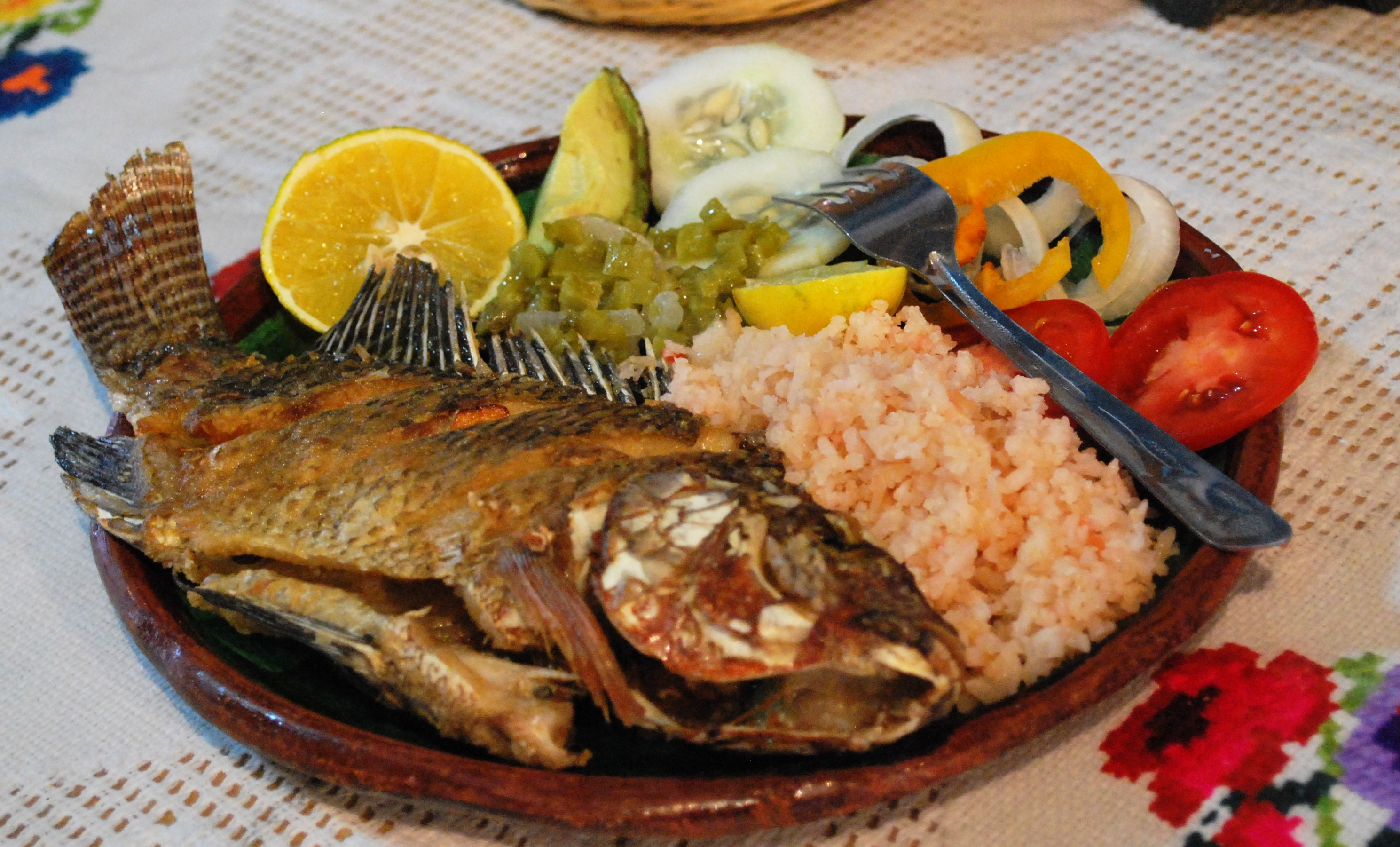
Mojarra frita (fried) served with various garnishes, including nopales, at Isla de Janitzio, Michoacán

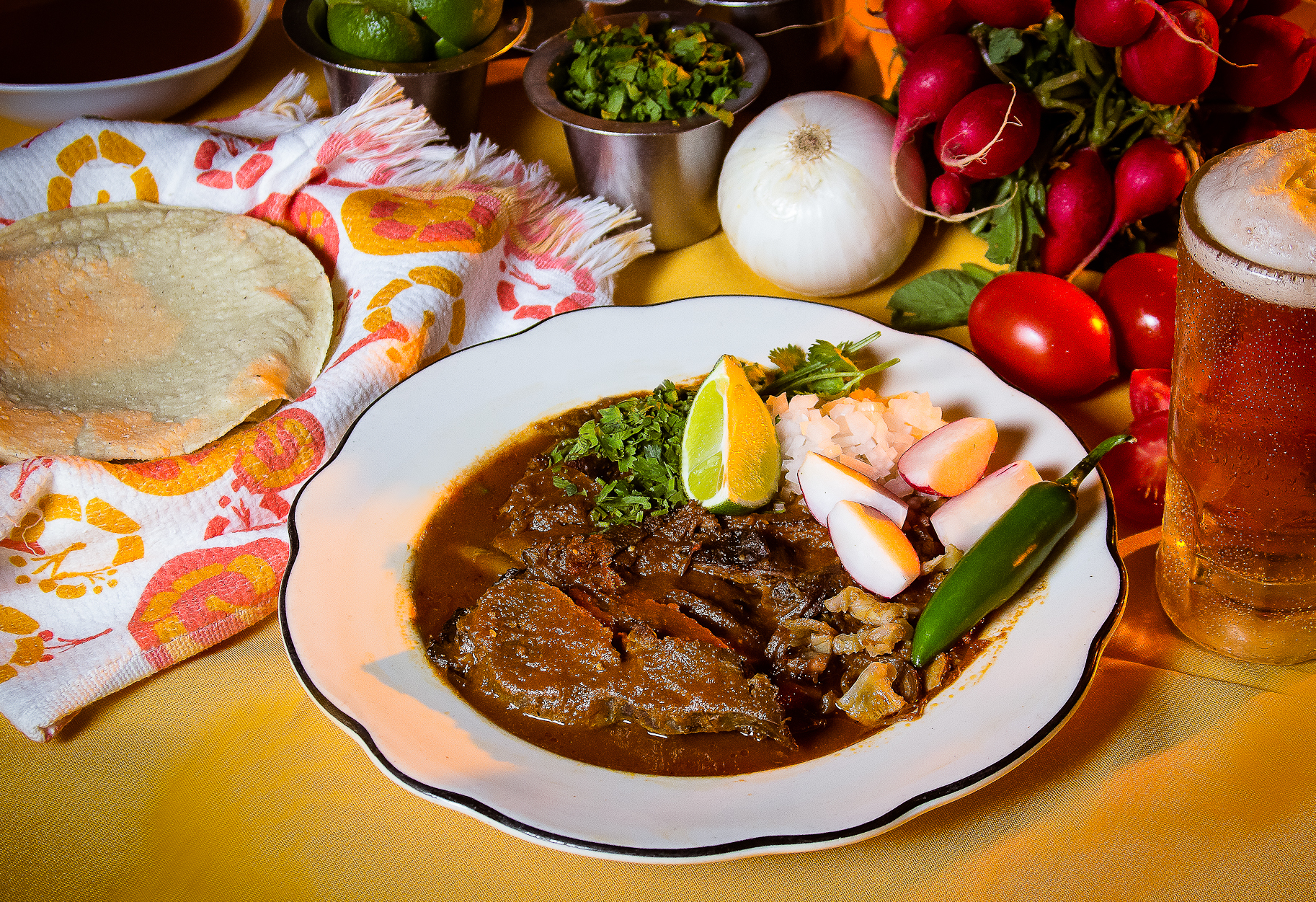
Birria, a common dish in Guadalajara

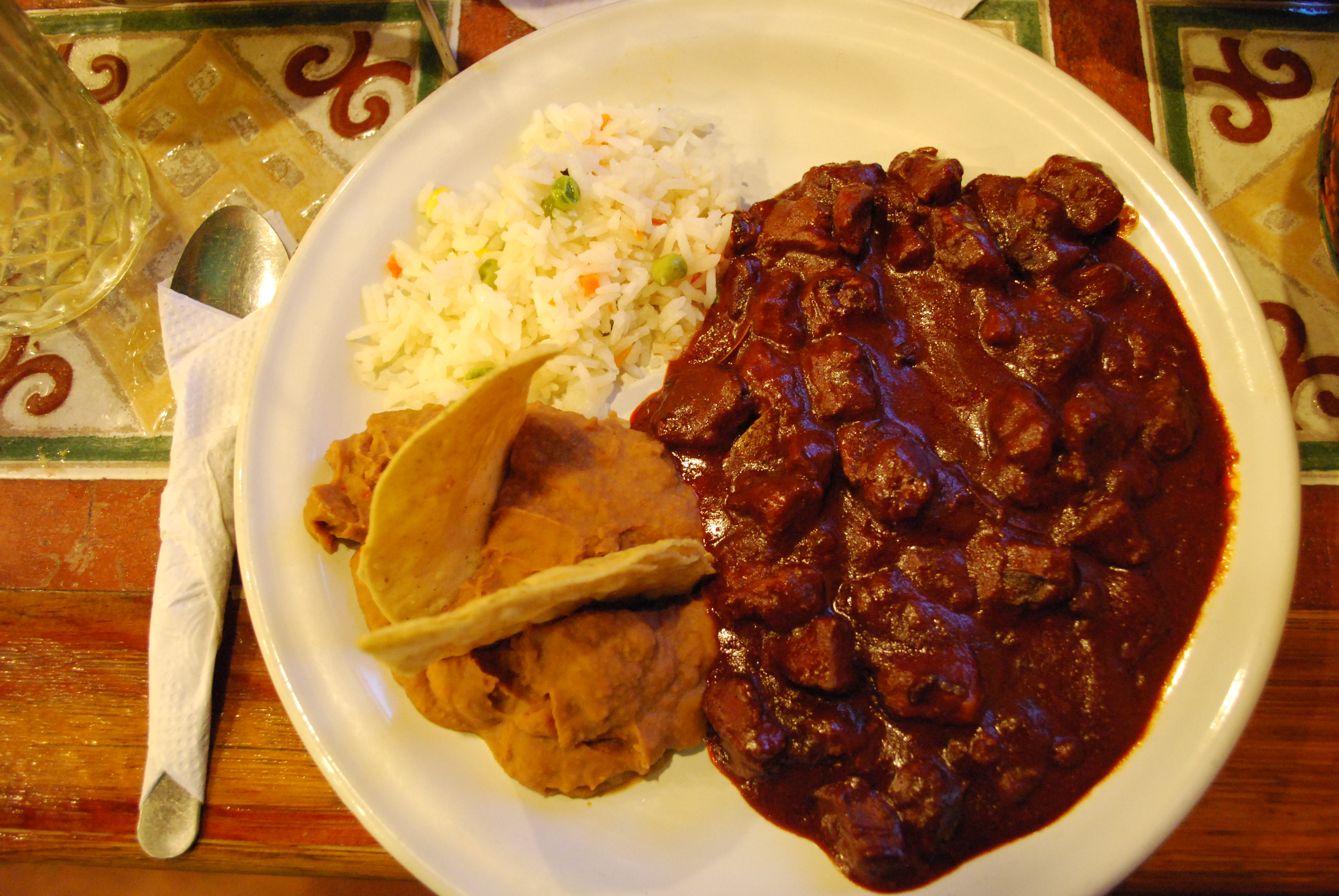
Asado de boda (Wedding stew), typical dish of Zacatecas

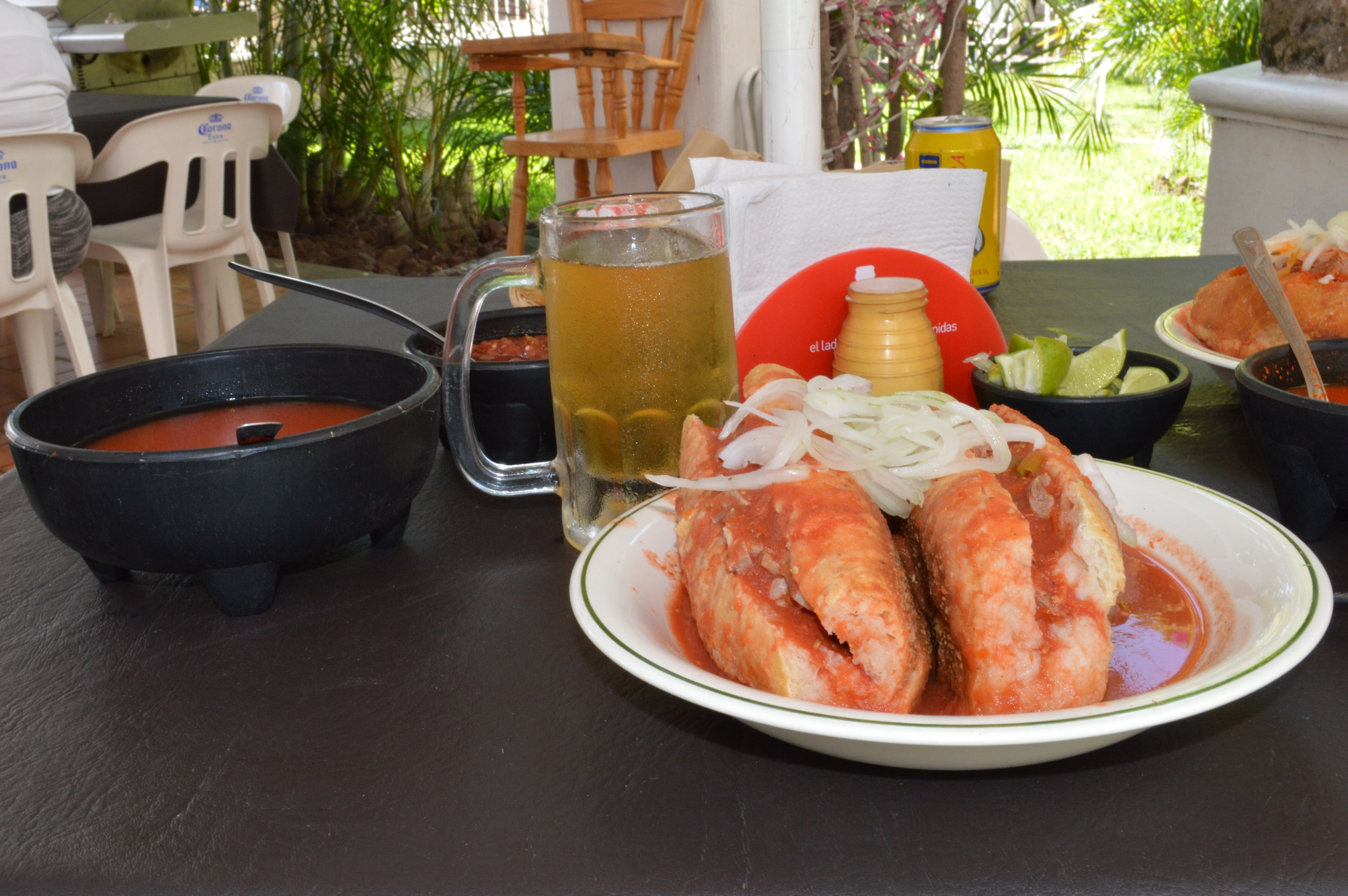
Torta ahogada accompanied by light beer, Jalisco

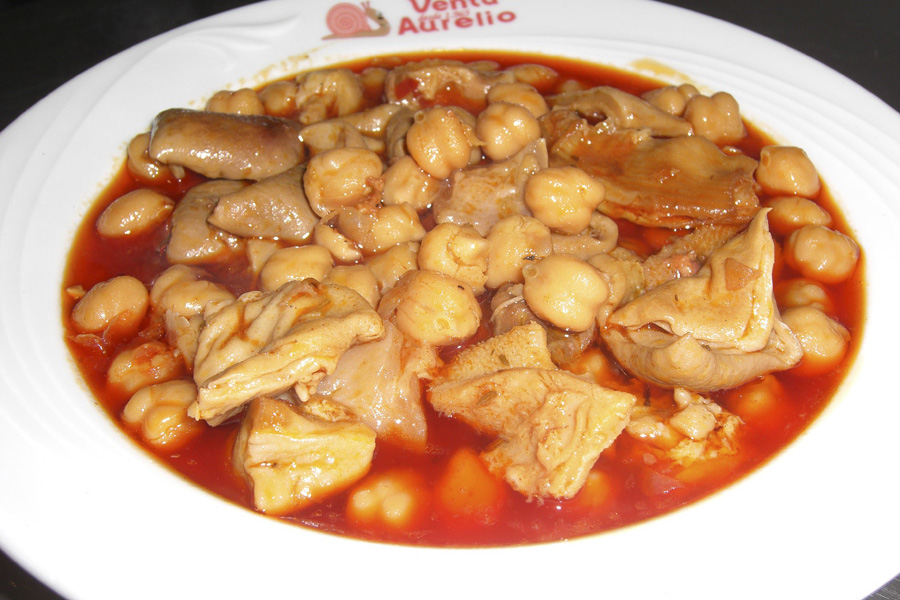
In widey held local folklore, menudo is said to alleviate some of the symptoms of a hangover.

=== Yucatán ===
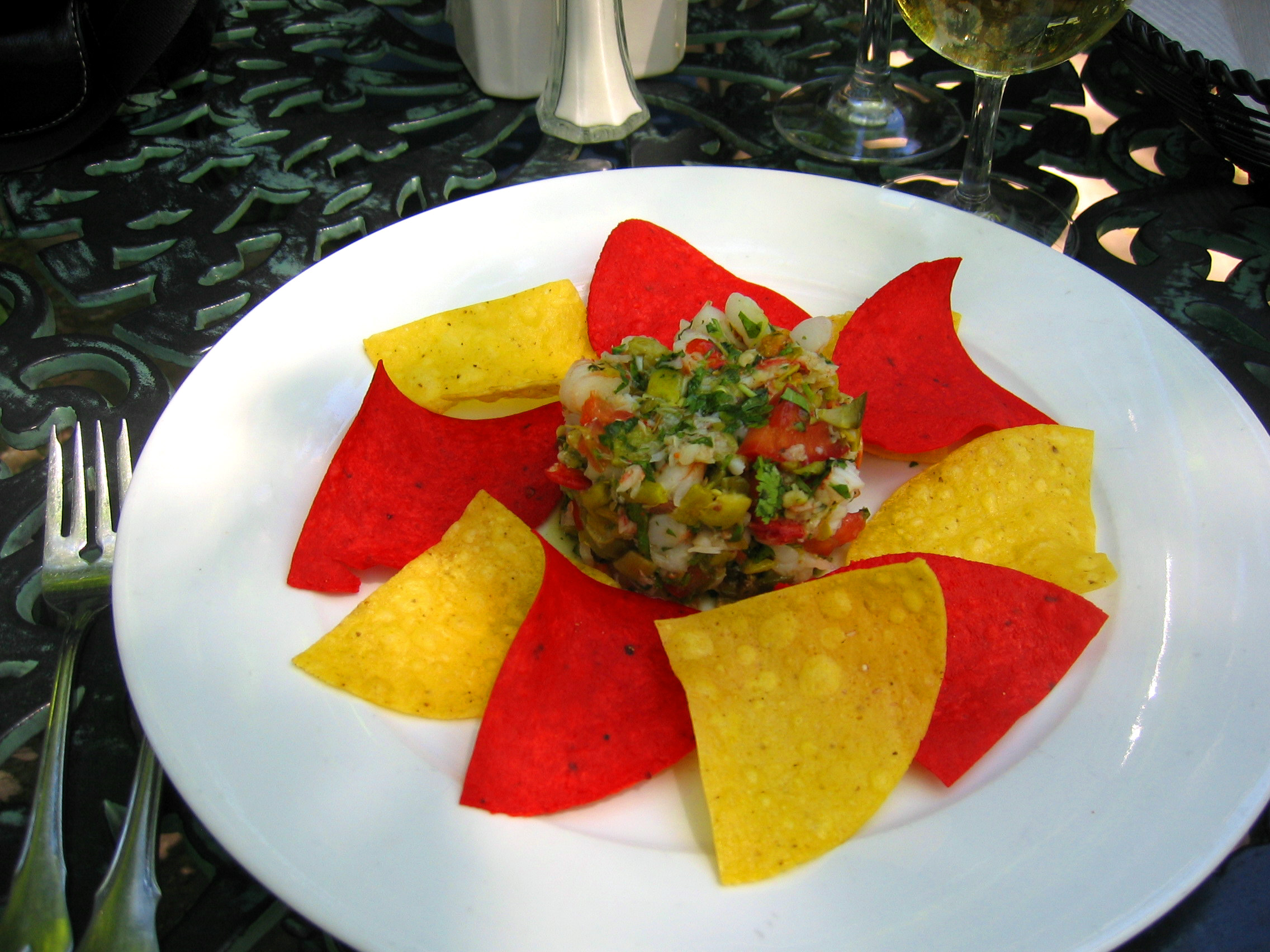
Mexican ceviche

The food of the Yucatán Peninsula is distinct from the rest of the country. It is based primarily on Maya food with influences from the Caribbean, Central Mexican, European (especially French) and Middle Eastern cultures. As in other areas of Mexico, corn is the basic staple, as both a liquid and a solid food. One common way of consuming corn, especially by the poor, is a thin drink or gruel of white corn called by such names as pozol or keyem.

One of the main spices in the region is the annatto seed, called achiote in Spanish. It gives food a reddish color and a slightly peppery smell with a hint of nutmeg. Recados are seasoning pastes, based on achiote (recado rojo) or a mixture of habanero and chirmole both used on chicken and pork.

Recado rojo is used for the area's best-known dish, cochinita pibil. Pibil refers to the cooking method (from the Mayan word píib, meaning "buried") in which foods are wrapped, generally in banana leaves, and cooked in a pit oven. Various meats are cooked this way. Habaneros are another distinctive ingredient, but they are generally served as (or part of) condiments on the side rather than integrated into the dishes.

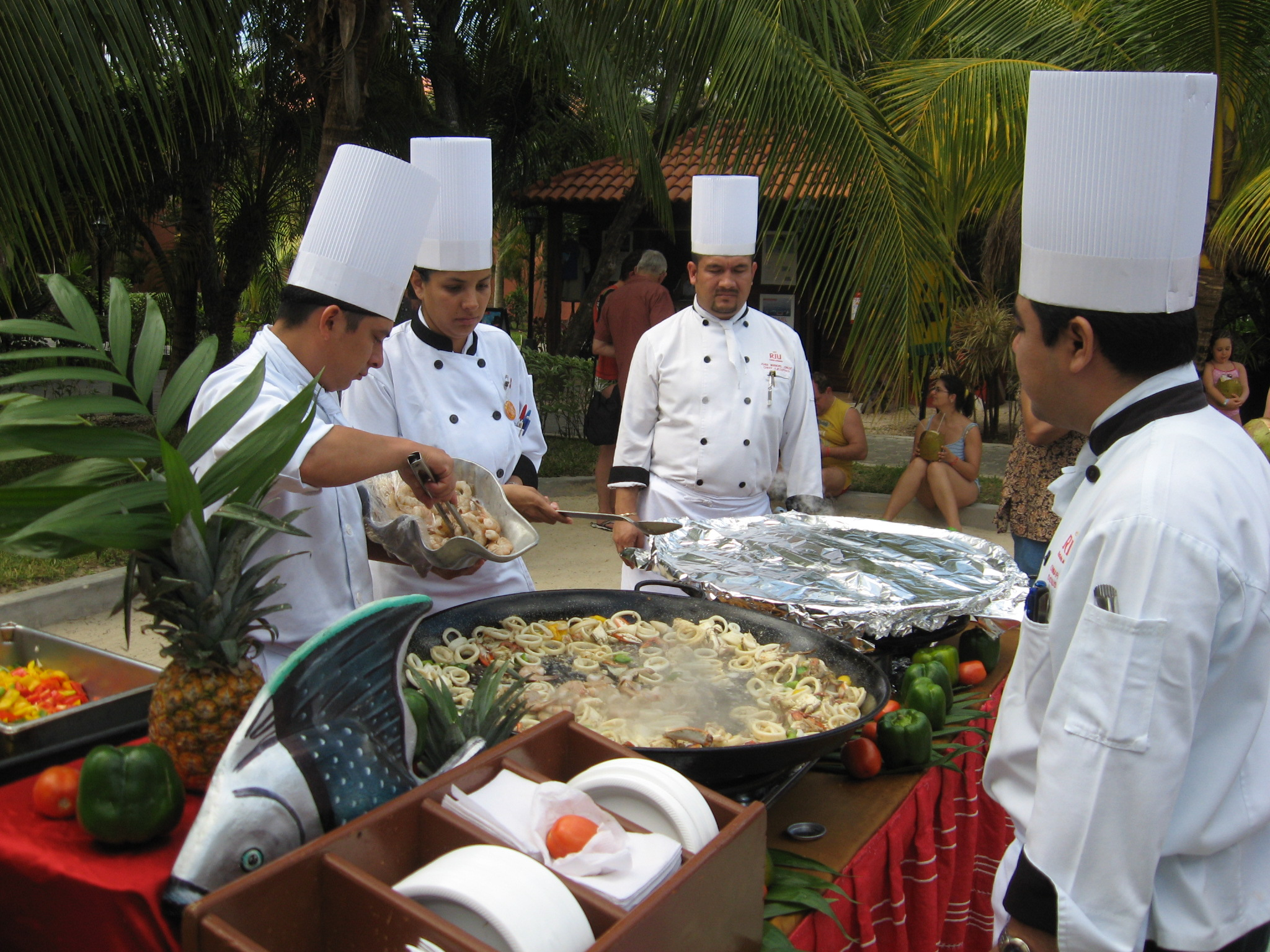
In Playa del Carmen Mexico, chefs don their standard uniforms

A prominent feature of Yucatán cooking is the use of bitter oranges, which gives Yucatán food the tangy element that characterizes it. Bitter orange is used as a seasoning for broth, to marinate meat and its juice (watered down with sugar) is used as a refreshing beverage.

Honey was used long before the arrival of the Spanish to sweeten foods and to make a ritual alcoholic drink called balché. Today, a honey liquor called xtabentun is still made and consumed in the region. The coastal areas feature several seafood dishes, based on fish like the Mero, a variety of grunt and Esmedregal, which is fried and served with a spicy salsa based on the x'catic pepper and achiote paste. Other dishes include conch fillet (usually served raw, just marinated in lime juice), coconut flavored shrimp and lagoon snails.

Traditionally, some dishes are served as entrées, such as the brazo de reina (a type of tamale made from chaya) and papadzules (egg tacos seasoned in a pumpkin seed gravy).

Street food in the area usually consists of Cochinita Pibil Tacos, Lebanese-based kibbeh, shawarma tacos, snacks made from hardened corn dough called piedras, and fruit-flavored ices.

Lime soup made of chicken or some other meat such as pork or beef, lime juice and served with tortilla chips. Panucho made with a refried tortilla that is stuffed with refried black beans and topped with chopped cabbage, pulled chicken or turkey, tomato, pickled red onion, avocado, and pickled jalapeño pepper.

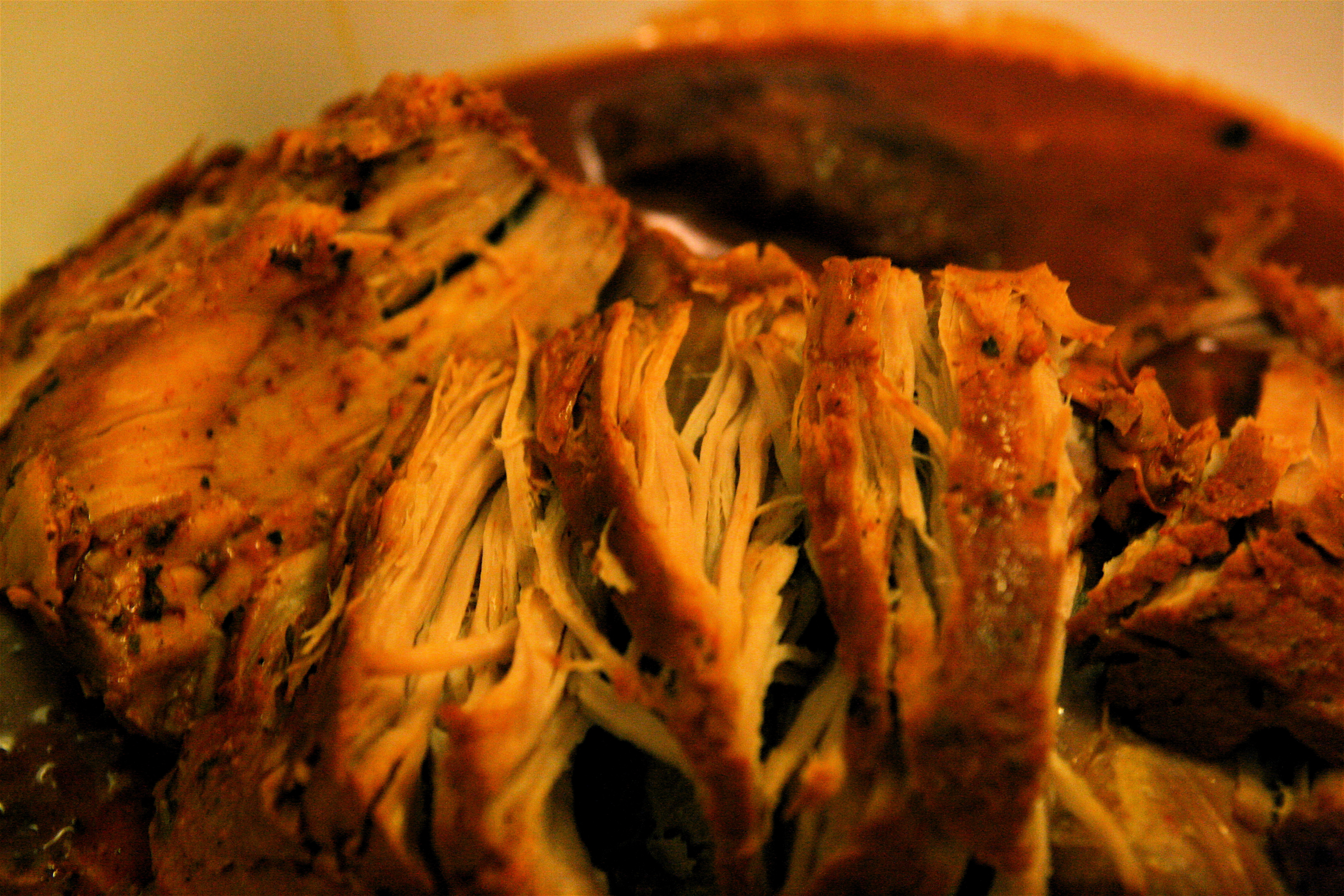
Cochinita Pibil, a fire pit-smoked pork dish, seasoned with achiote, spices and Seville orange

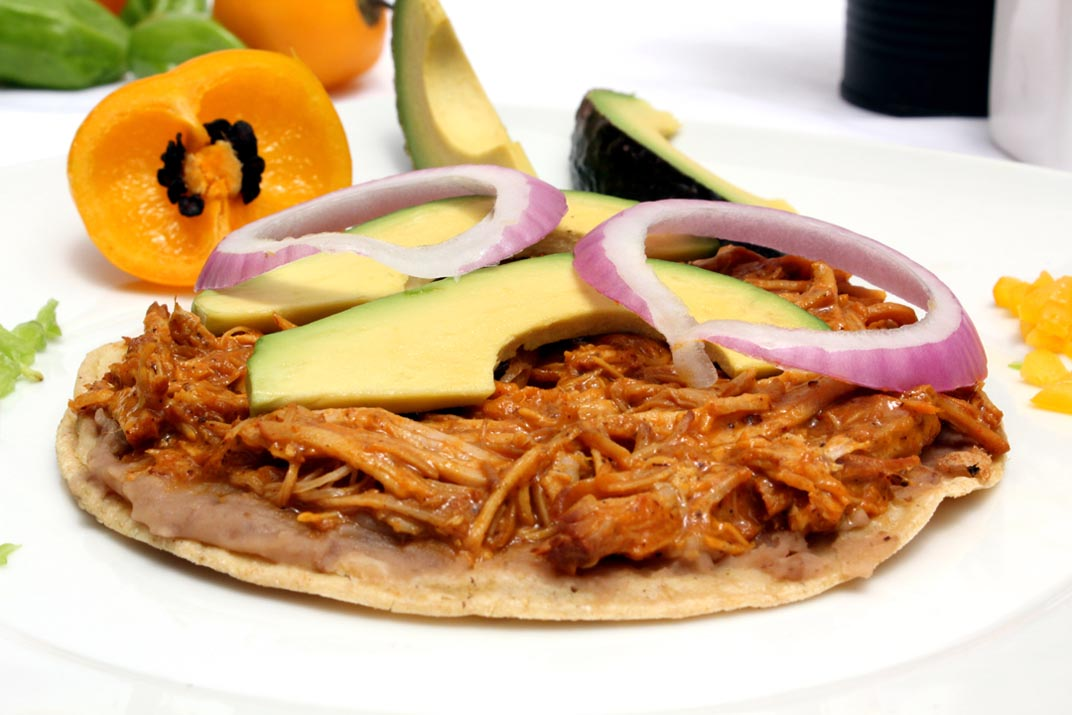
Panucho

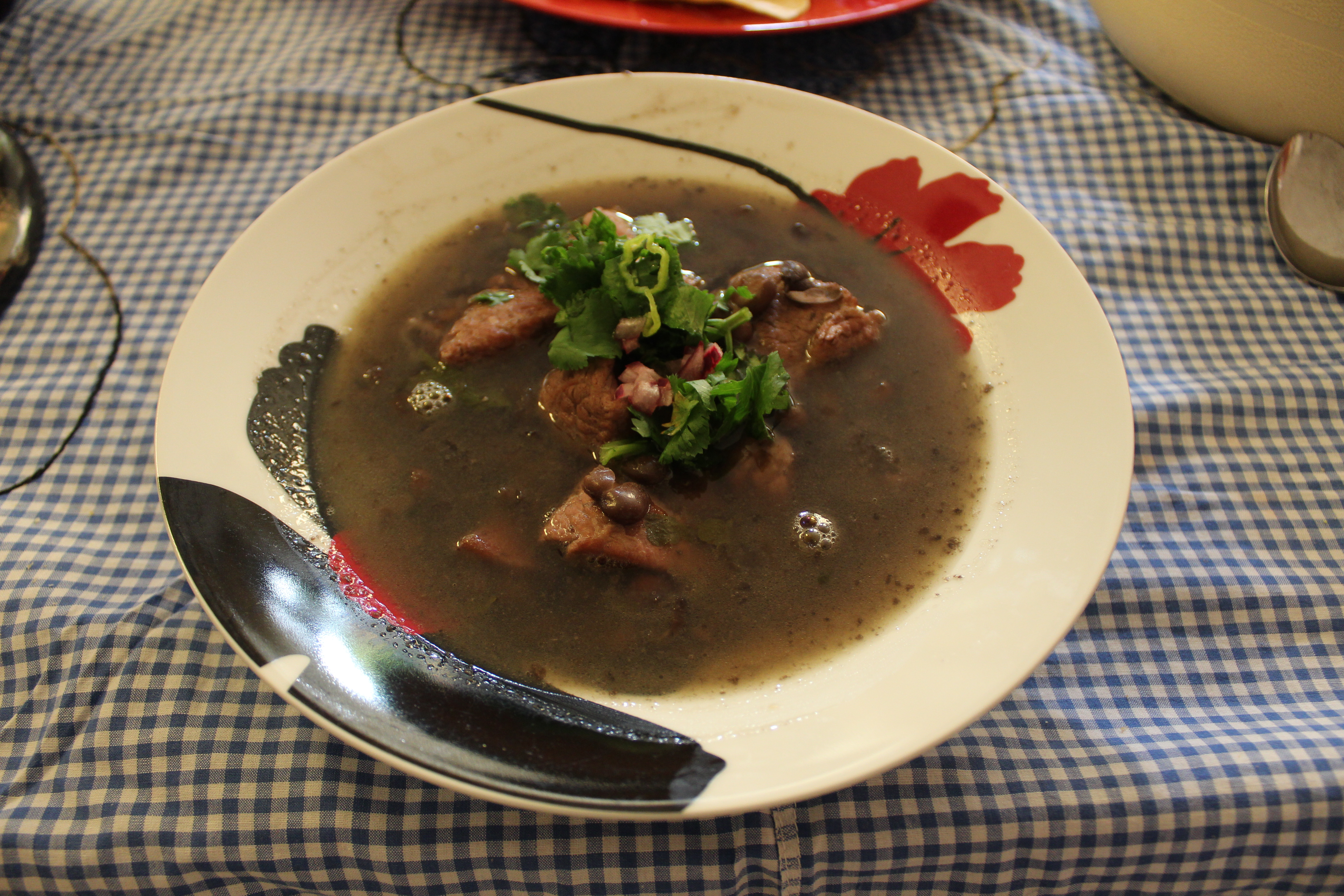
Frijol con puerco (beans with pork) prepared with beans, pork, epazote, onion, cilantro, lemon, radishes and habanero chile

== Desserts ==
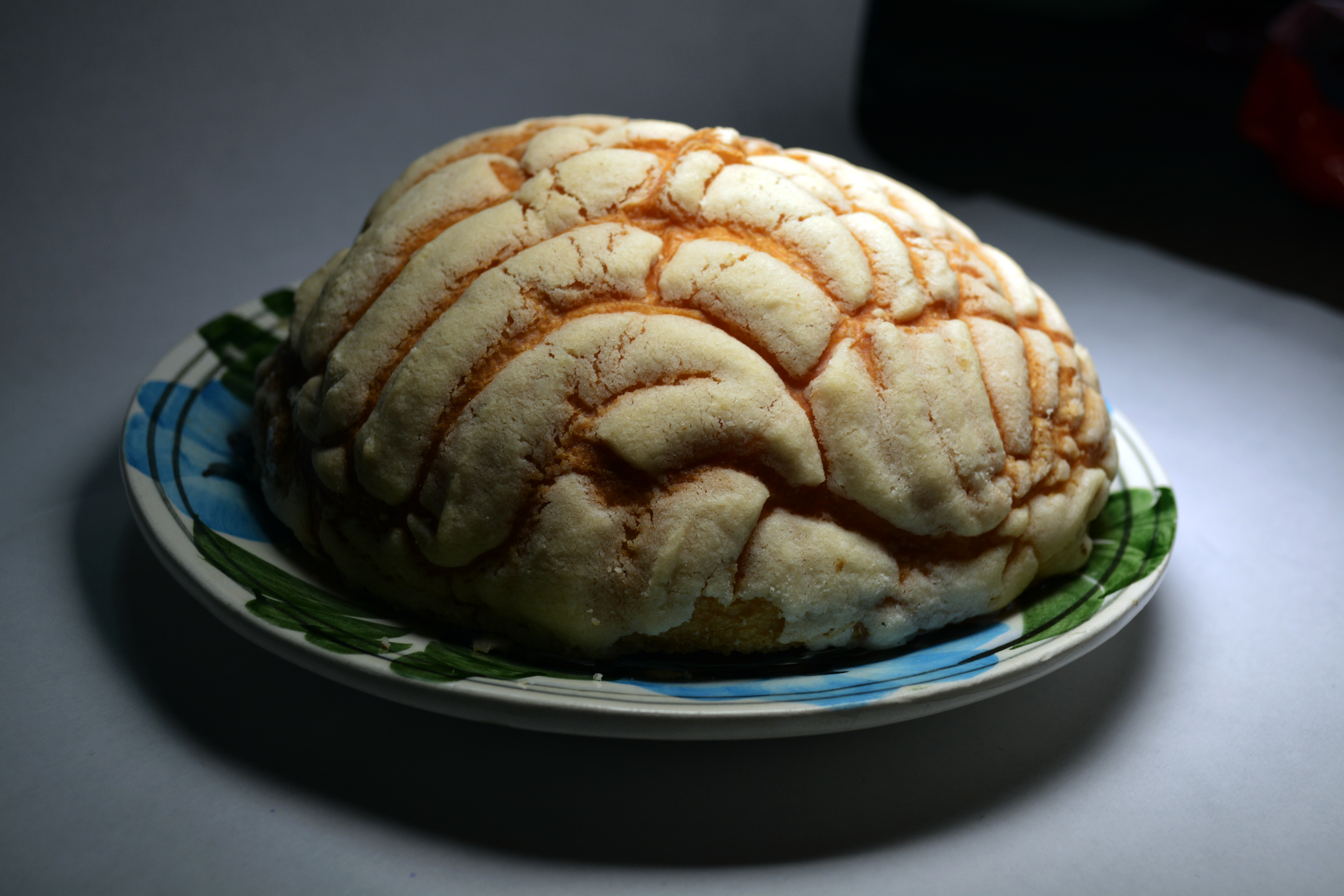
Concha is a traditional Mexican sweet bread roll (pan dulce).

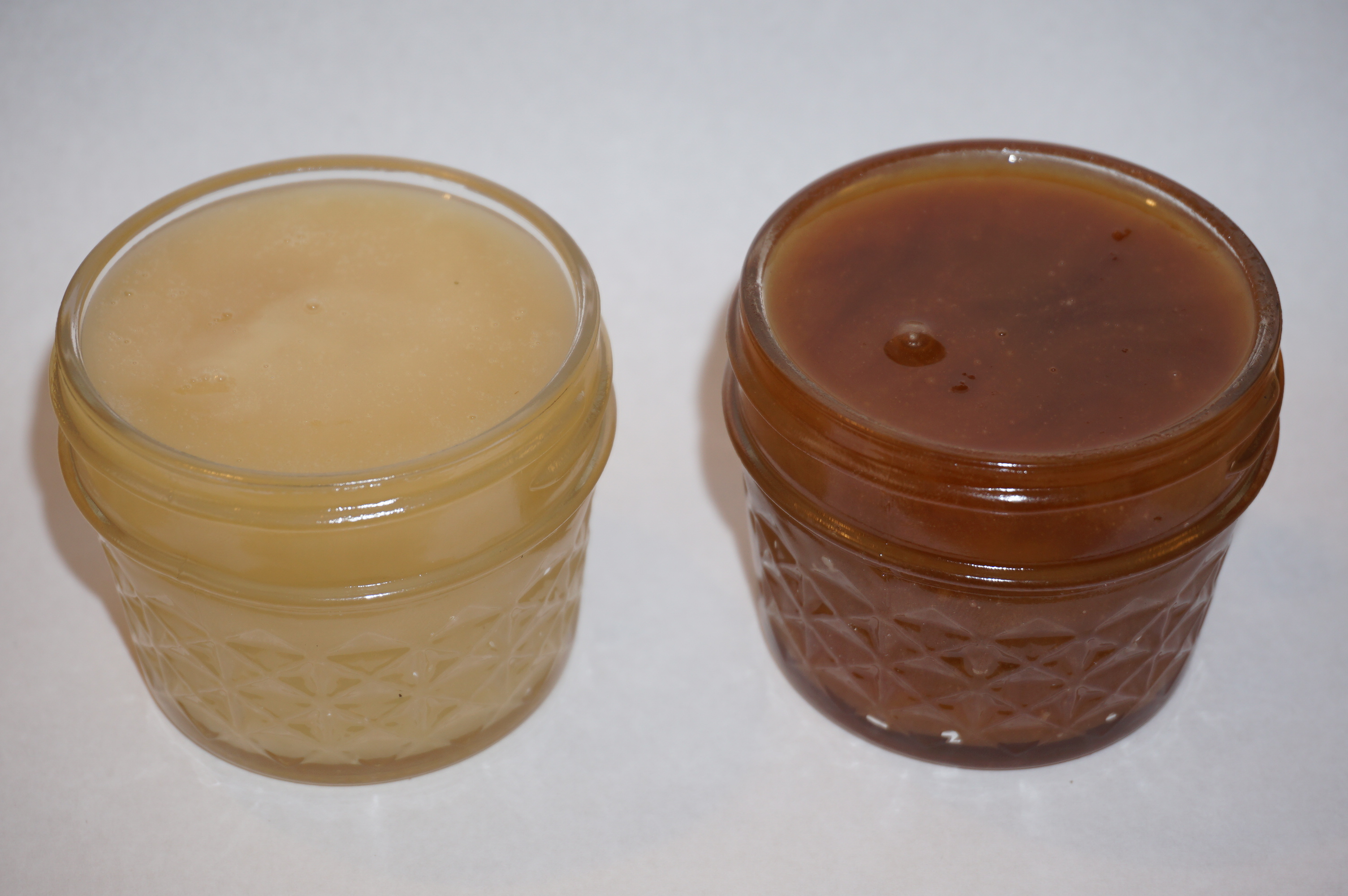
Mexico is among the countries that produce the most honey.

Dessert culture in Mexico did not develop until after the introduction of Spanish customs to the area. There were foods which could be considered desserts by modern standards like chocolate, but they were consumed and used differently. With the introduction of Europeans and their food and culture to the region came sugar and with it, sweets. The range of desserts evolved and grew over time to include everything from churros to rice pudding, from cakes to fruit treats. Some of the desserts which historically are made in Mexico are fairly easy to make and can be produced in high quantity.

=== Chocolate ===
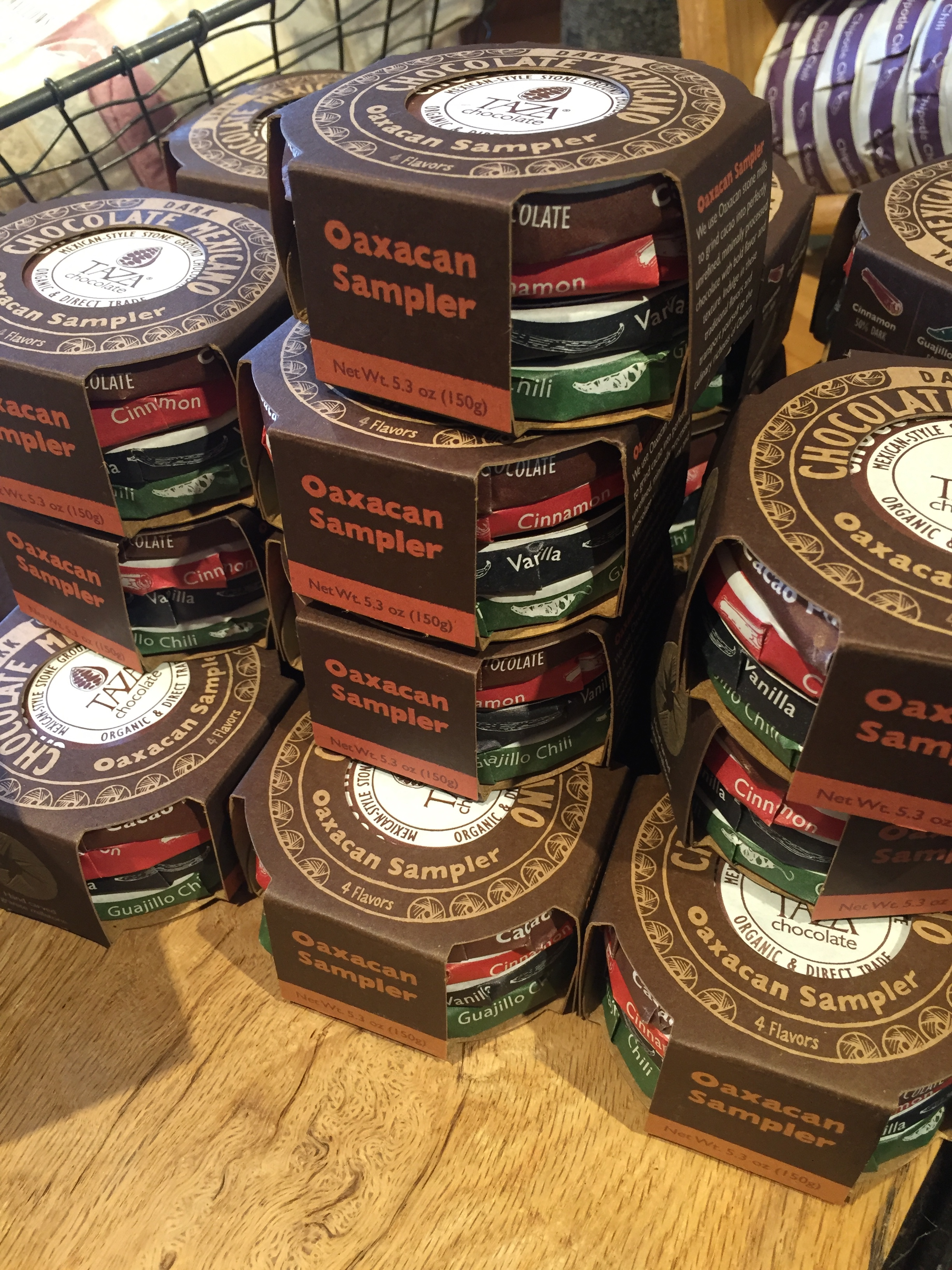
Mexican chocolate discs

In the era pre-dating European influence chocolate was drunk in a warm syrupy form mixed with honey to create a pleasant drinking experience. During this time chocolate was also treated as medicine. After the arrival of Europeans, chocolate was brought across the sea to Europe where it would be used in various forms including medicine and confections. In the modern era, chocolate is used as both a topping and a dip, as well as in candies. The traditional form of chocolate consumption lives on in the form of Mexican hot chocolate, the natural evolution of the warm syrup.

=== Fruits ===
There are few fruit-related dessert recipes which are popular in Mexico, some using native fruits, such as plantains, and others using foreign fruits like oranges. Recipes for these foods can not be found dating back to the early 19th century and incorporate both sugar and ice. Fruit dishes are naturally sweet and juicy which made them popular in the Mexican climate.

One such dessert is orange and lime ice, a treat similar to snow cones. It is made by freezing strained oranges and lime juice mixed with sugar.

=== Baked goods ===
Baked dessert items in Mexico are mostly ideas imported from Europe over time. These items came from a variety of different nations before becoming staples of desserts in the region. Baked goods include cookies made with local fruits, churros which originated in the Iberian Peninsula, and macaroons which come from Italy. Churros can be made by mixing flour with boiling water, shaping and frying that mixture then coating it in cinnamon or sugar. Churros can be eaten hot or cold and can be molded into any number of different shapes.

=== Tres Leches Cake ===
The most popular cake in all of Mexico is tres leches cake (Three Milk's Cake). It is moist due to its milky ingredients. To top things off, it can be topped off with whipped cream and other sorts of jams, cherries or strawberries.

== Mexican food outside Mexico ==
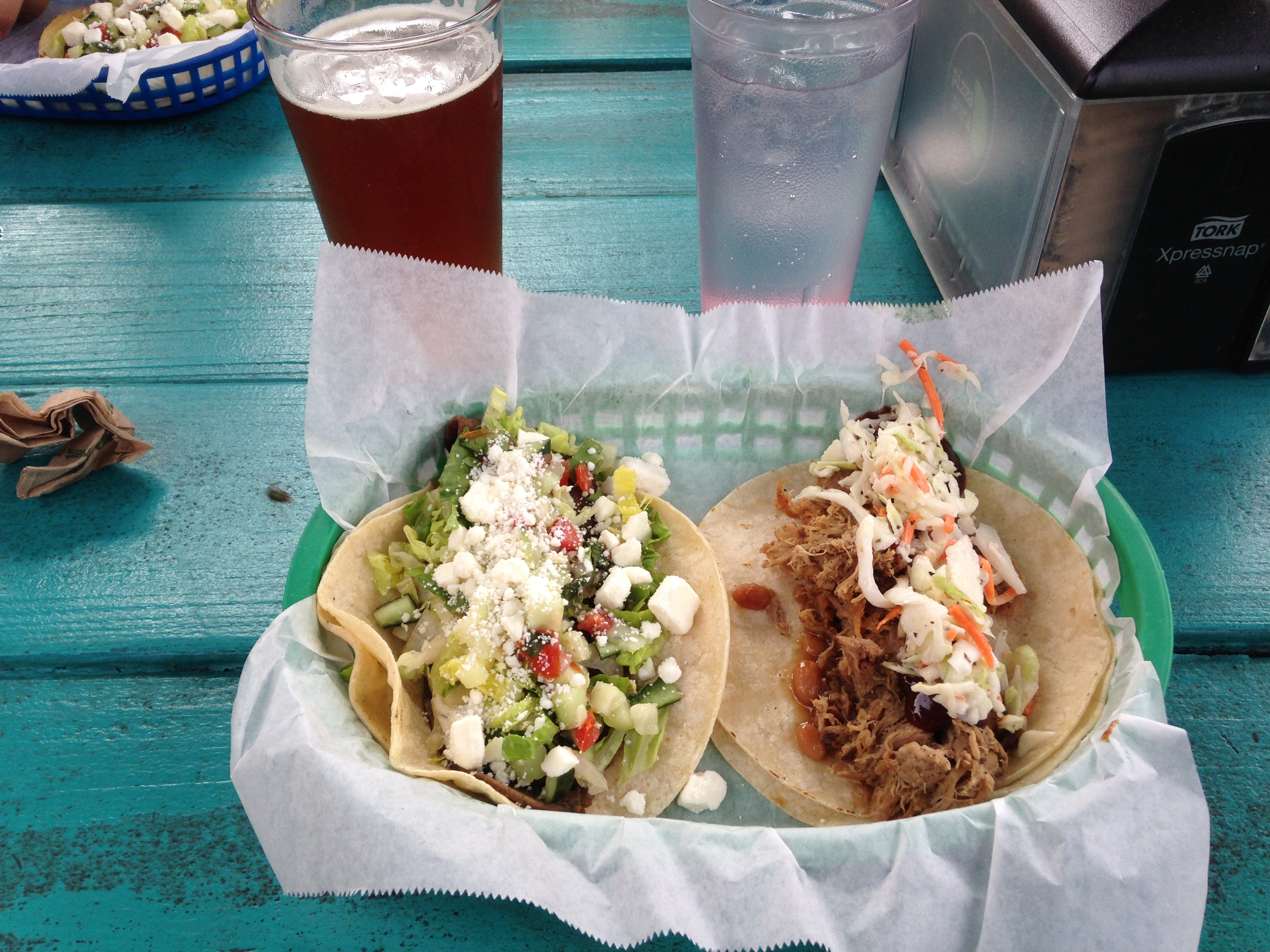
Greek-style barbecue taco with feta cheese

Mexican cuisine is offered in a few fine restaurants in Europe and the United States. Sometimes landrace corn from Mexico is imported and ground on the premises.

=== United States ===
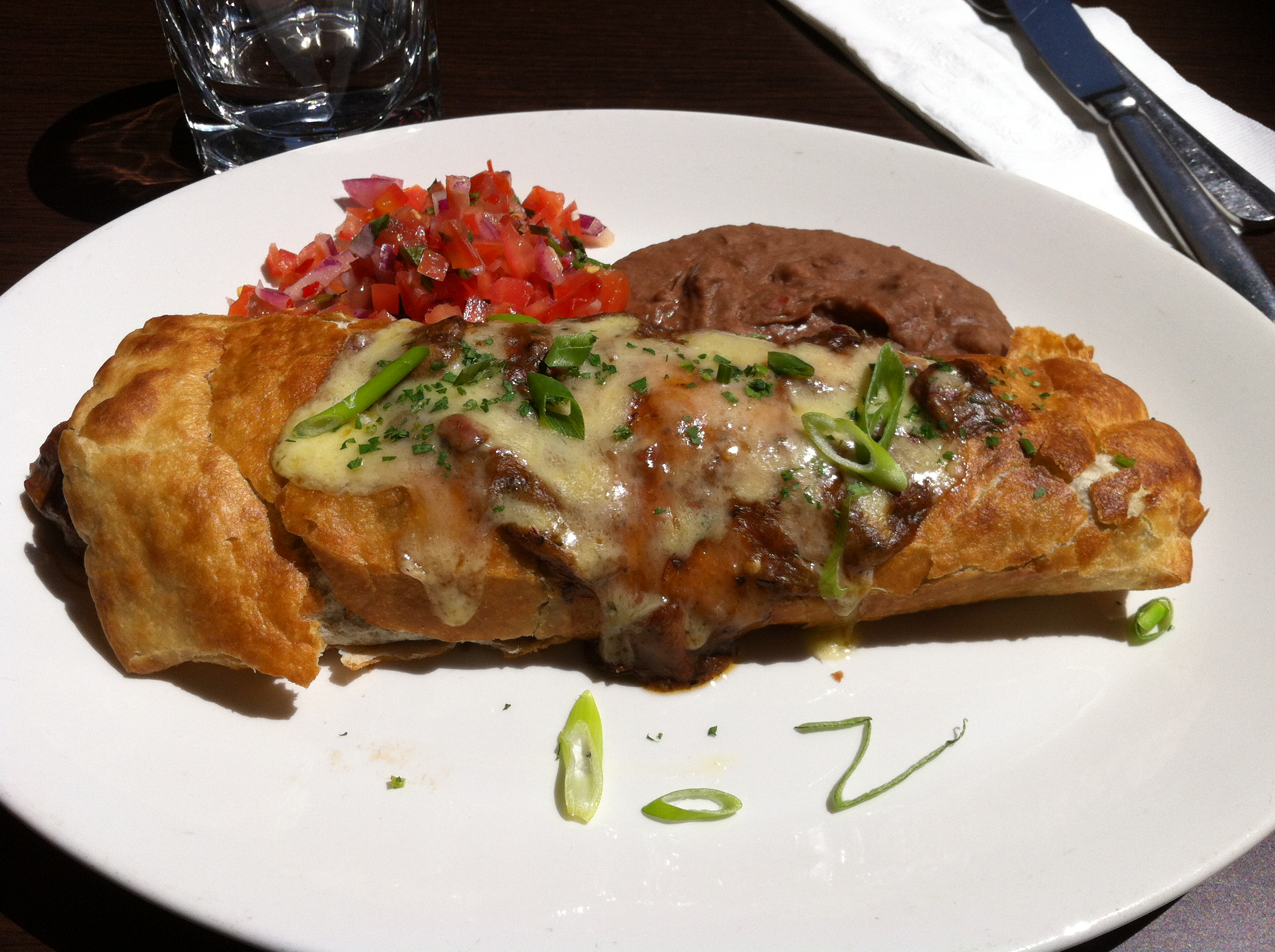
Chimichanga served in restaurant (Melbourne, Australia)

Mexican food in the United States is based on the food of Native Americans and Hispanos in the Southwestern United States and Northern Mexico. Mexican foods that originate in the United States often come from the Southwestern region; breakfast burritos and red or green chile come from New Mexican cuisine, and chili con carne and chimichangas are examples of Tex-Mex cuisine. With the growing ethnic Mexican-American population in the United States, more authentic Mexican food is gradually appearing in the United States. Most large American cities host a Mexican diaspora due to proximity and immigration, and Mexican restaurants and food trucks are generally easy to find in the continental states. One reason is that Mexican immigrants use food as a means of combating homesickness, and for their descendants, it is a symbol of ethnicity. Alternatively, with more Americans experiencing Mexican food in Mexico, there is a growing demand for more authentic flavors.

Korean tacos are a Korean-Mexican fusion dish popular in a number of urban areas in the United States and Canada. Korean tacos originated in Los Angeles. Sushi burrito is a Japanese–Mexican fusion food that became popular in urban areas across the United States, originating in California as part of the broader trend of innovative street food. The sushi burrito was created in 2008 by Peter Yen of the San Francisco fast casual restaurant Sushirrito. In 2013, Carlos Gaytán became the first Mexican to obtain a Michelin star for his work at the Mexique restaurant in Chicago. In 2014, Daniela Soto-Innes helped to open Cosme in New York City, serving there as the chef de cuisine. Houston chef Irma Galvan's restaurant was recognized and named an 'American classic' by the James Beard Foundation in 2008.

== See also ==
- List of Mexican dishes
- Latin American cuisine
- List of restaurants in Mexico
- List of Mexican restaurants
- Moctezuma's Table
- Alejandro Ruiz Olmedo
- Enrique Olvera
- Gabriela Cámara
- Carmen Ramírez Degollado
- Indigenous cuisine of the Americas
- Cuisine of California

== Bibliography ==
- Iturriaga, José N. (1993). La Cultura del Antojito [The Culture of Snack/Street Food] (in Spanish). Mexico City: Editorial Diana. ISBN 968-13-2527-3.
- Pilcher, Jeffrey M. Que Vivan Los Tamales! Food and the Making of Mexican National Identity (1998).
- Luengas, Arnulfo (2000). La Cocina del Banco Nacional de México [The Cuisine of the National Bank of Mexico] (in Spanish). Mexico City: Fomento Cultural Banamex. ISBN 968-7009-94-2.
- Abarca, Meredith E. (2006). Rio Grande/Río Bravo: Borderlands Culture, 9: Voices in the Kitchen: Views of Food and the World from Working-Class Mexican and Mexican American Women. College Station, TX, US: Texas A&M University Press. ISBN 978-1-58544-531-8.
- Adapon, Joy (2008). Culinary Art and Anthropology. Oxford: Berg Publishers. ISBN 978-1-84788-213-4.
- Malat, Randy, ed. (2008). Passport Mexico: Your Pocket Guide to Mexican Business, Customs and Etiquette. Barbara Szerlip. Petaluma, CA, US: World Trade Press. ISBN 978-1-885073-91-4.
- Pilcher, Jeffrey M. Planet Taco: A Global History of Mexican Food (Oxford University Press, 2012) online review.
- Hernandez-Rodriguez, R. Food Cultures of Mexico. Recipes, Customs, and Issues (Greenwood, 2021).
