= Vilmorin (disambiguation) =

Vilmorin may refer to:

- Vilmorin, French-based seed producer
- Philippe André de Vilmorin (1776-1862)
- Louis de Vilmorin (1816-1860)
- Philippe de Vilmorin (1872-1917)
- Louise de Vilmorin (1902-1969)
- Arboretum Vilmorin
