= Vilmorin =

French seed producer

Vilmorin SA
- Company type: Public
- Traded as: Euronext: RIN
- Industry: Agriculture
- Predecessor: Andrieux (from 1742); Chez Vilmorin-Andrieux (from 1775); Vilmorin-Andrieux & Cie (from 1815); Vilmorin SA (from 1986); Vilmorin & Cie (from 1992); Vilmorin Clause & Cie (from 1997)
- Founded: 1743; 283 years ago
- Founder: Claude Geoffroy & Pierre Andrieux
- Headquarters: La Ménitré, France
- Area served: Europe, North America, Asia, the Middle East, Australia
- Products: Seeds
- Number of employees: 750
- Parent: Limagrain
- Subsidiaries: Vilmorin Iberica (Spain, Portugal), Vilmorin Italia (Italy), Vilmorin North America (USA, Canada), Vilmorin Do Brasil (Brazil), Vilmorin Atlas (Morocco), Vilmorin Anadolu Tohumculuk (Turkey), OOO Vilmorin (Russia), Semillas Shamrock Internacional (Mexico, Central America)
- Website: https://www.vilmorincie.com/en/

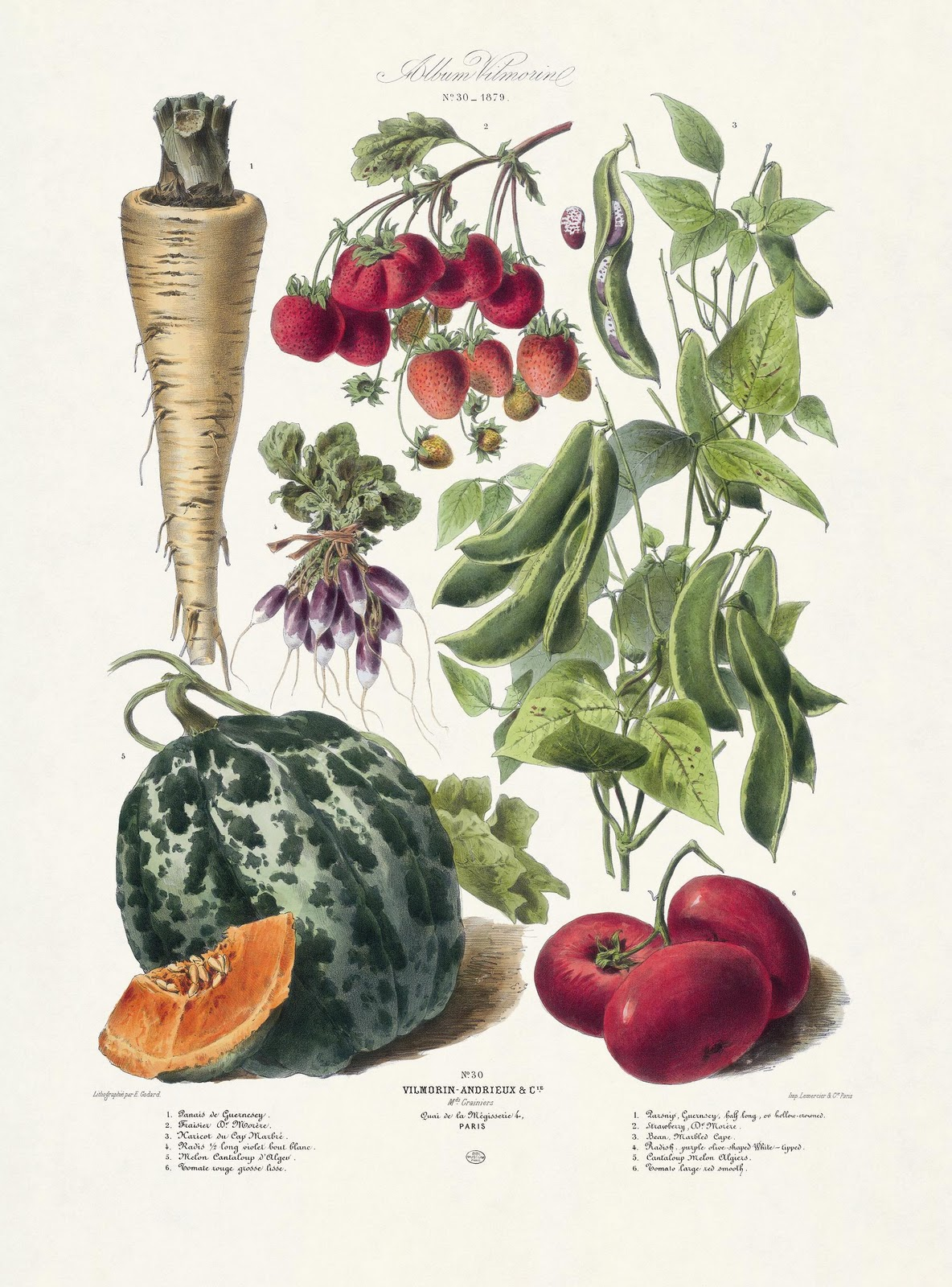
Plate 30 Album Vilmorin (1879)

Vilmorin is a French seed producer. The company has a long history in France, where it was family-controlled for almost two centuries, and today exists as a publicly traded company owned principally by agro-industrial cooperative Groupe Limagrain, the largest plant breeding and seed company in the European Union.

== History ==
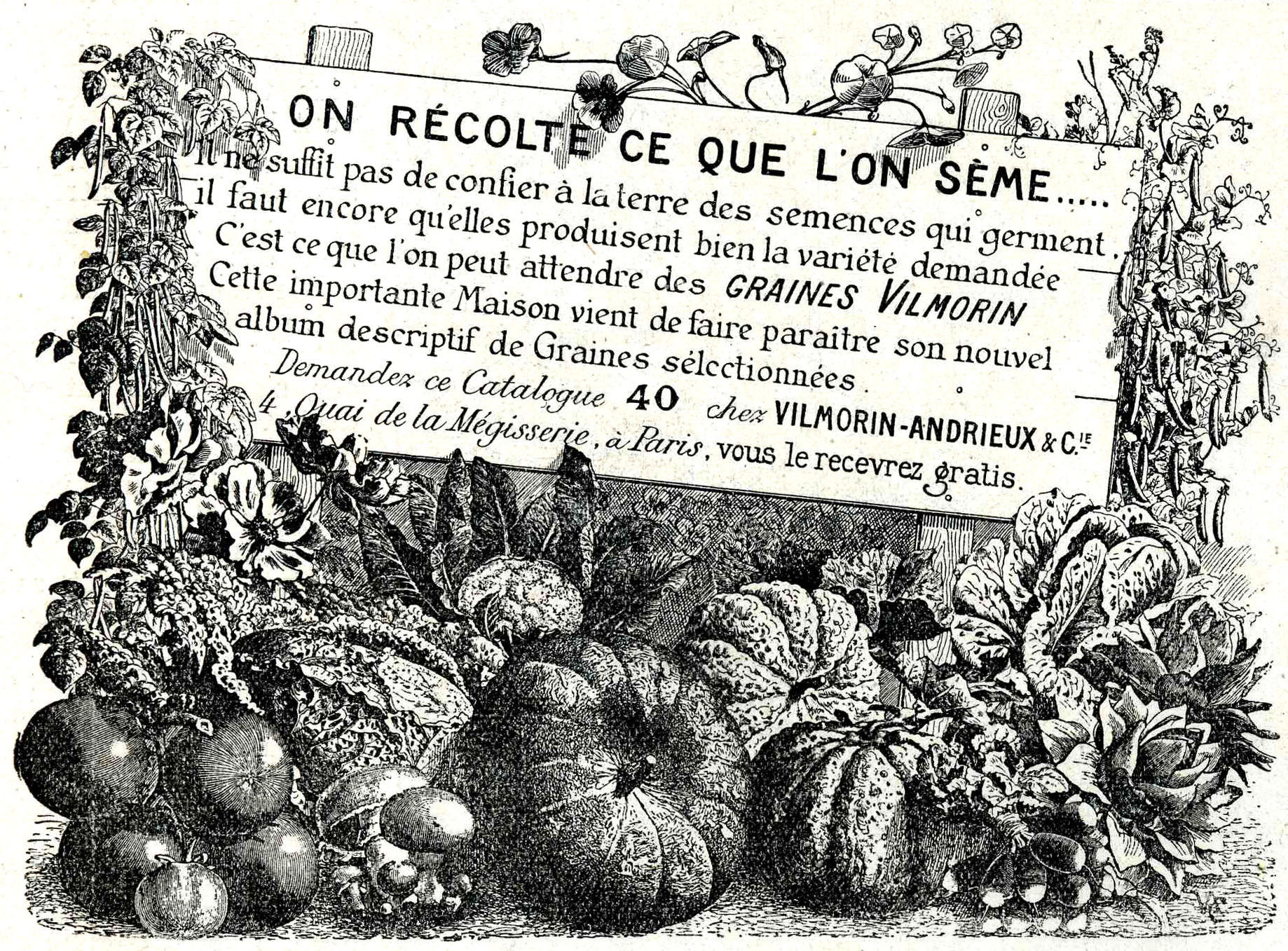
Advertisement in Le Miroir (1914)

Vilmorin was founded as a plant and seed boutique in 1743 by seed expert Claude Geoffroy and her husband Pierre Andrieux, the chief seed supplier and botanist to King Louis XV. The store was located on the quai de la Mégisserie, a street in the 1st arrondissement of Paris. In 1774, their daughter married botany enthusiast Philippe-Victoire Levêque de Vilmorin (1746–1804). Together, they revived the stores and created the Vilmorin-Andrieux House, which later became Vilmorin-Andrieux and Company under the leadership of their son, Philippe André de Vilmorin (1776–1862). Philippe-Victoire de Vilmorin began importing trees and exotic plants into Europe in 1766, starting with the American tulip tree, the domesticated beet, and the rutabaga. Such plants were unknown in Europe prior to Vilmorin-Andrieux's commercial promotion of them for food, fodder and ornamentation.

The Vilmorin estate in the Paris suburb of Verrières-le-Buisson, a former hunting lodge of Louis XIV, became known for its gardens and arboretum, and the Vilmorin company was headquartered in Verrières-le-Buisson, where it was led by a succession of Vilmorin heirs, including Louis de Vilmorin (1816–1860), Elisa Bailly de Vilmorin (1826–1868), Henry de Vilmorin (1843–1899), Maurice de Vilmorin (1849–1918), Philippe de Vilmorin (1872–1917), Jacques de Vilmorin (1882–1933), Louis de Vilmorin (1883–1944), Louise de Vilmorin (1902–1969), Olivier de Vilmorin (1904–1962), Roger de Vilmorin (1905–1980), and André de Vilmorin (1907–1987).

The company produced the first seed catalog for farmers and academics. In 1856, Louis de Vilmorin published "Note on the Creation of a New Race of Beetroot and Considerations on Heredity in Plants", establishing the theoretical groundwork for the modern seed-breeding industry. The company's leaders continued to publish numerous botanical academic articles throughout the company's early history.

In 1972 the company was acquired by René Hodée, a farmer from the Anjou region who relocated the company to La Ménitré, a town to the southwest of Paris. Three years later, in 1975, he sold the company to Groupe Limagrain, which changed the name from Vilmorin-Andrieux to Vilmorin SA in 1986, and in 1989 created the Oxadis division to specialize in Vilmorin's home vegetable garden activities, including vegetable seeds, flowers and trees, plant health products, and various pet and garden supplies for the amateur market. Following this restructuring, Vilmorin focused on vegetable seeds and trees for professionals (growers, seed producers, and nurseries).

== Bibliography ==
- Gustave Heusé, Les Vilmorin (1746–1899) : Philippe Victoire Levêque de Vilmorin (1746–1804); Pierre Philippe André Levêque de Vilmorin (1776–1862); Pierre Louis François Levêque de Vilmorin (1816–1860); Charles Philippe Henry Levêque de Vilmorin (1843–1899), Librairie agricole de la Maison rustique, Paris, 1899, 32 p.
- Le guide Clause-Vilmorin du jardin, Oxadis, Saint-Quentin-Fallavier, 2008 (35th edition), 719 p. ISBN 2-9512916-4-7.
