= Arboretum municipal de Verrières-le-Buisson =

Municipal arboretum in Essonne, Île-de-France, France

Coordinates: 48°45′6″N 2°16′13″E

The Arboretum municipal de Verrières-le-Buisson (1.5 hectares), more formally the Arboretum municipal de Verrières-le-Buisson, Réserve naturelle volontaire Roger de Vilmorin, Maison des Arbres et des Oiseaux, is a municipal arboretum located at 1, voie de l'Aulne, Verrières-le-Buisson, Essonne, Île-de-France, France. It is open weekends without charge.

The arboretum was established in 1910 as part of the Arboretum Vilmorin, acquired in 1975 by the municipality, and is now tended by young people 14–25 years in age. It contains more than 200 species of trees from the Northern Hemisphere, as well as several from the Southern Hemisphere. The arboretum is organized as a wooded area, orchard, prairie, pond, and nursery.

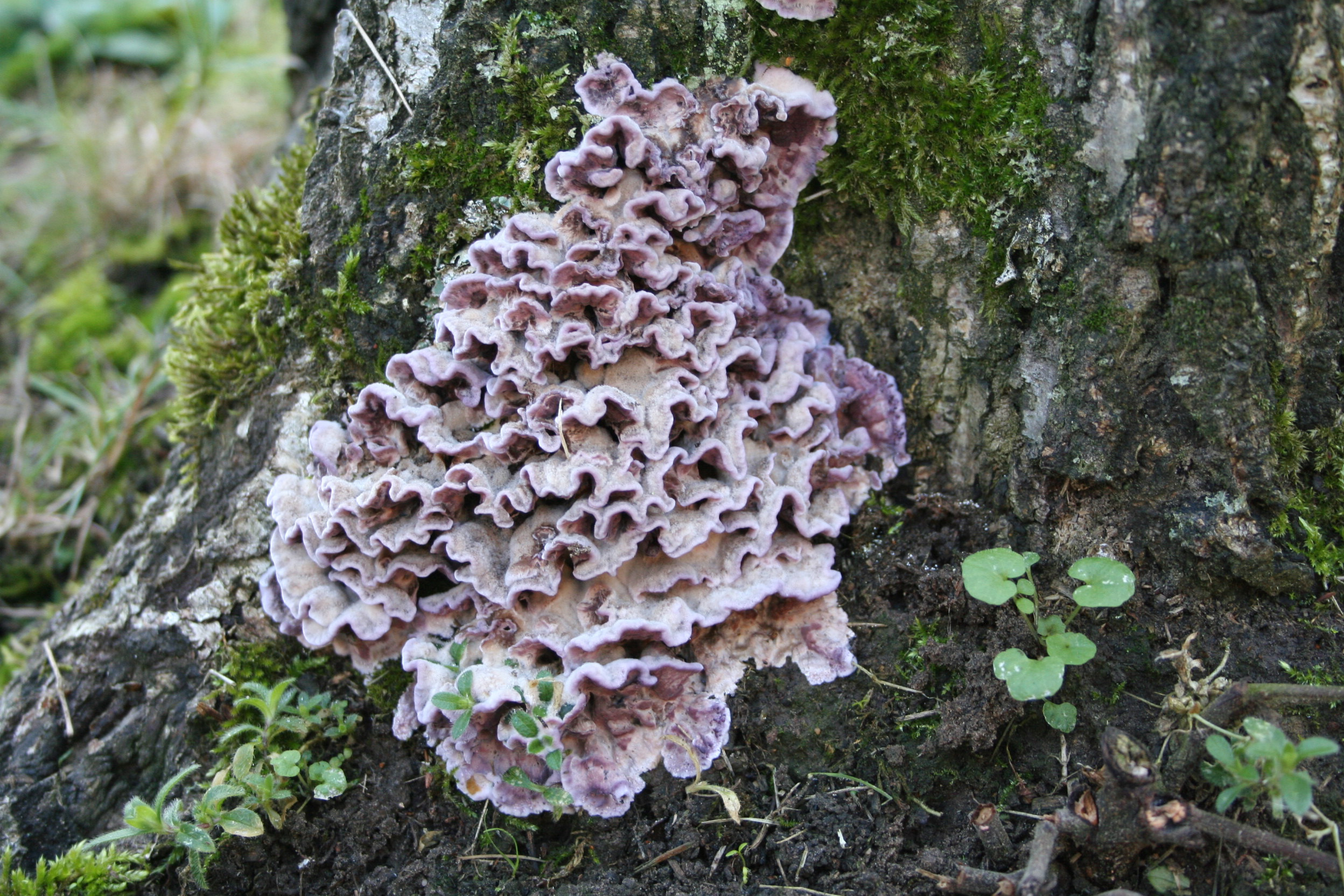
Arboretum municipal de Verrières-le-Buisson

== See also ==
- List of botanical gardens in France
