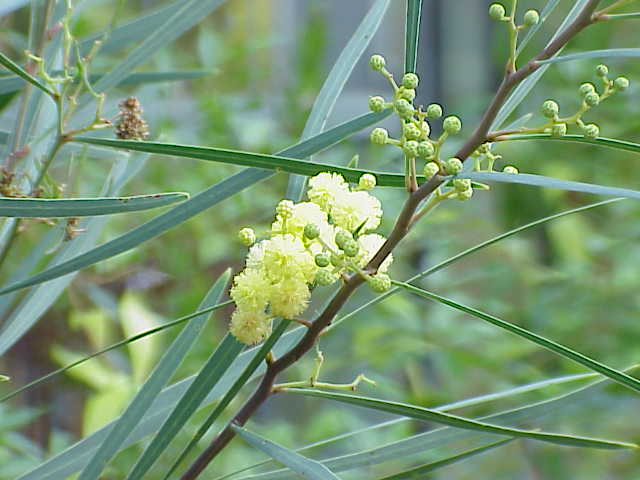

Scientific classification
- Kingdom: Plantae
- Clade: Tracheophytes
- Clade: Angiosperms
- Clade: Eudicots
- Clade: Rosids
- Order: Fabales
- Family: Fabaceae
- Subfamily: Caesalpinioideae
- Clade: Mimosoid clade
- Genus: Acacia
- Species: A. retinodes

Binomial name
- Acacia retinodes Schltdl.
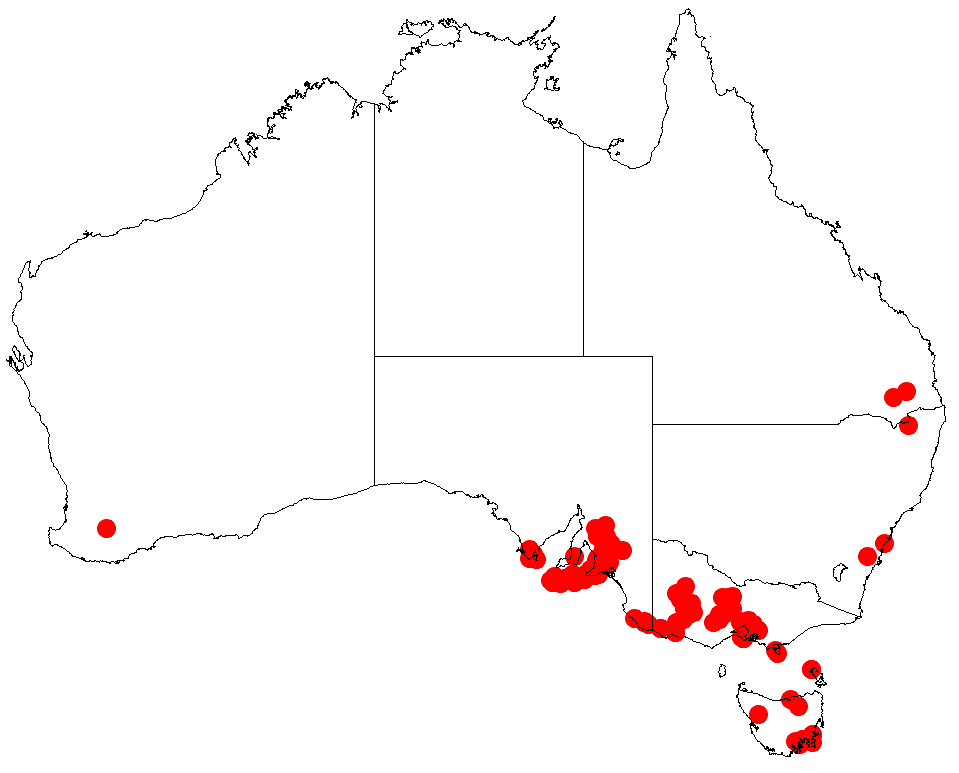
- Occurrence data from AVH

Synonyms
- Acacia floribunda sensu auct.; Acacia fragrans Pottier; Acacia longissima Chopinet; Acacia provincialis A.Camus; Acacia retinodes Schltdl. var. floribunda H.Vilm.; Acacia retinoide Schltr.; Acacia retinoides Schltr.; Acacia rhetinoides Schltr.; Acacia rostellifera sensu auct.; Acacia semperflorens A.Berger

= Acacia retinodes =

Species of legume

Acacia retinodes is an evergreen shrub that is native to South Australia, Victoria and Tasmania. Short racemes of yellow flowers are produced periodically throughout the year. Some common names are retinodes water wattle, swamp wattle, wirilda, ever-blooming wattle and silver wattle.

== Description ==
The tree typically grows to a height of 6 to 10 m (20 to 33 ft) and is able to form suckers. It has furrowed bark with a rough texture that is dark brown to black in colour. It has glabrous branchlets that are sometimes pendulous or angular or flattened at extremities. Like most species of Acacia it has phyllodes rather than true leaves. The green to grey-green, glabrous and variable phyllodes are quite crowded on stems and have a narrowly oblanceolate to linear shape. The phyllodes are 5 to 16 cm (2.0 to 6.3 in) in length and 3 to 16 mm (0.12 to 0.63 in) wide with one main nerve per face. It mostly blooms in summer between December and February.

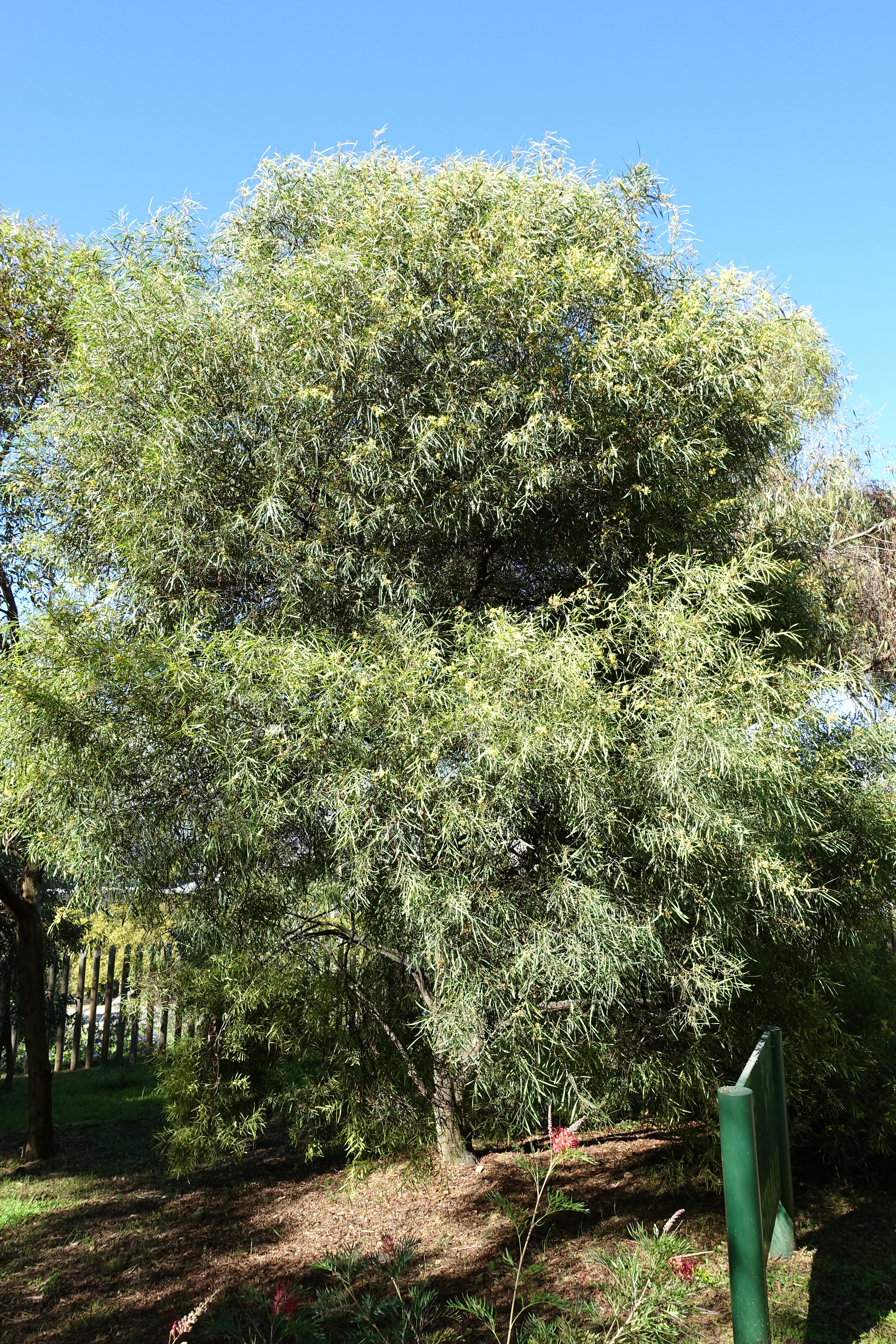
Acacia retinodes tree

== Taxonomy ==
The species was first formally described by the botanist Diederich Franz Leonhard von Schlechtendal in 1847 as part of the work Sudaustralische Pflanzen. II. Bestimmung und Beschreibung der von Dr Behr in Sudaustralien gesammelten Pflanzen as published in the journal Linnaea: ein Journal für die Botanik in ihrem ganzen Umfange, oder Beiträge zur Pflanzenkunde. It was reclassified as Racosperma retinodes by Leslie Pedley in 2003 then transferred back to genus Acacia in 2007.

=== Varieties ===
- A. retinodes var. retinodes
- A. retinodes var. uncifolia

== Distribution ==
In South Australia it is native to the Mount Lofty Ranges from around Mount Clare to Mount Bryan extending down the Fleurieu Peninsula to around Delamere and Normanville in the south and is regarded as a weed further to the southeast. It is commonly situated on low ranges and hills as a part of Eucalyptus woodland communities.

== Uses ==
It is used for environmental management and for ornamental purposes. It produces good quantities of gum and its bark is good for tanning. It has gained the Royal Horticultural Society's Award of Garden Merit. In temperate regions it requires a frost-free sheltered spot with full sun. Indigenous Australians ate the gum, after softening it in water, to relieve chest pains.

The plant is grown as a house plant in temperate climates, where it is resistant to most diseases and pests. It can be grown in almost any well-drained potting soil, but requires ample light and water from spring to summer. Watering should be reduced in the fall and winter. Repotting is generally necessary at the start of each growth season. The plant is usually propagated from seed, but can be propagated from cuttings, though these may take several months to root.

== Gallery ==
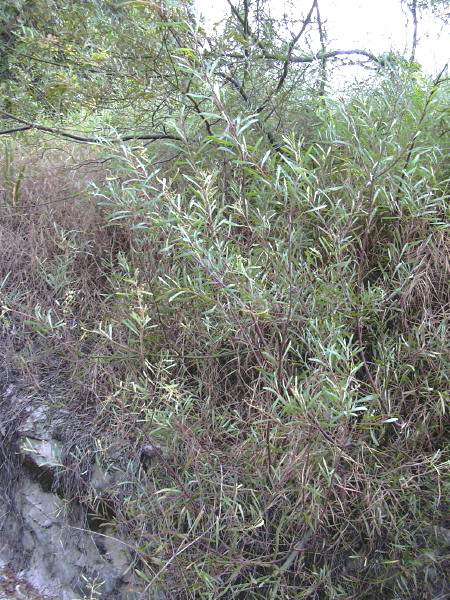
Acacia retinodes habit

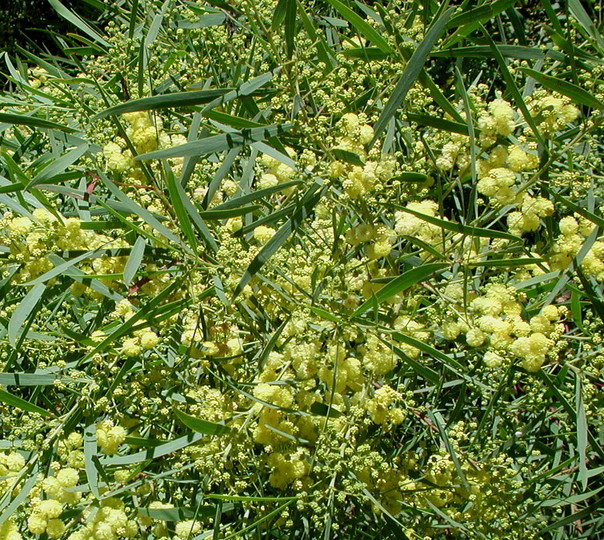
Flowers and foliage

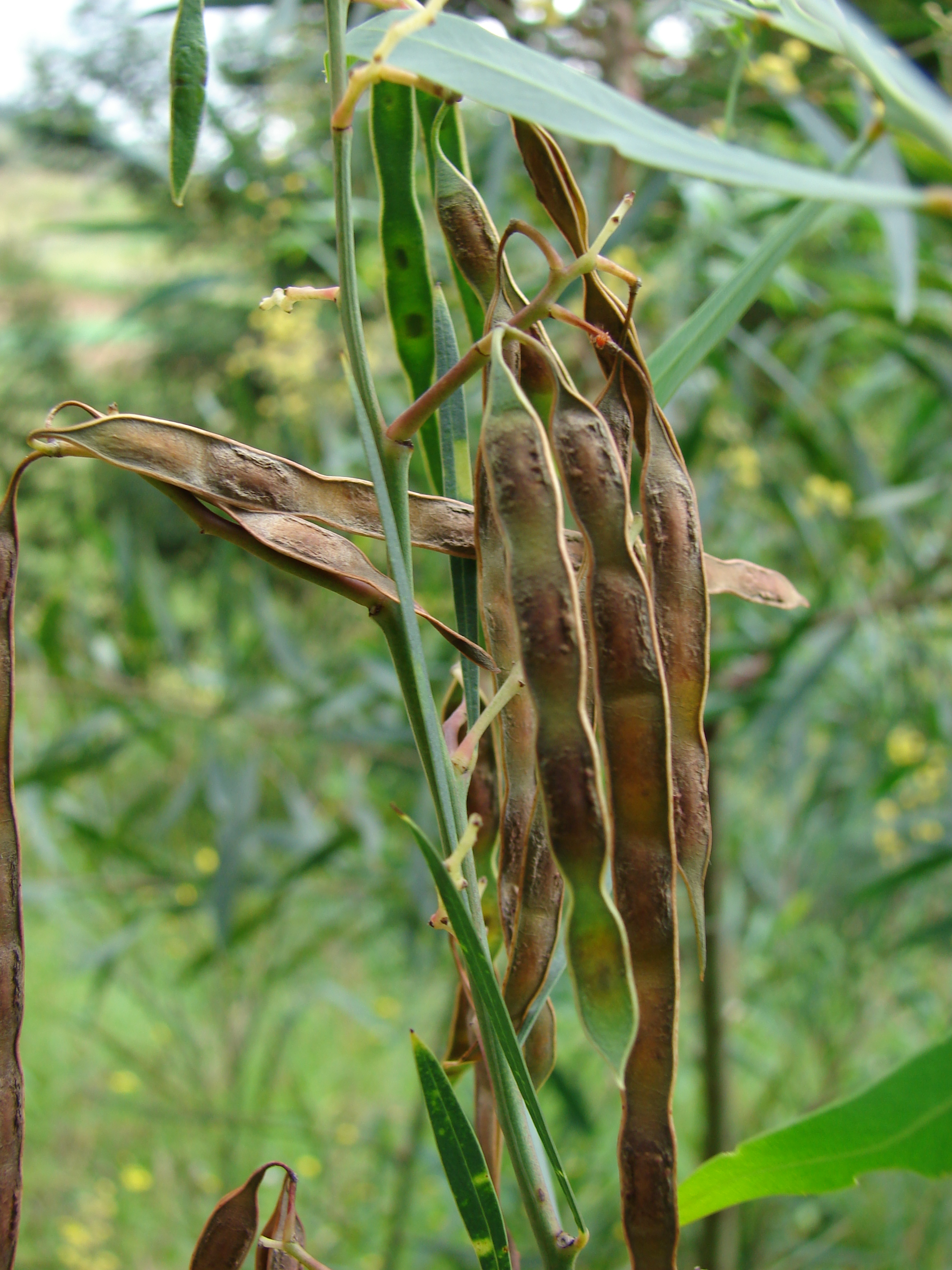
Seedpods in Maui

== See also ==
- List of Acacia species
