= Henry de Vilmorin =

French botanist (1843–1899)

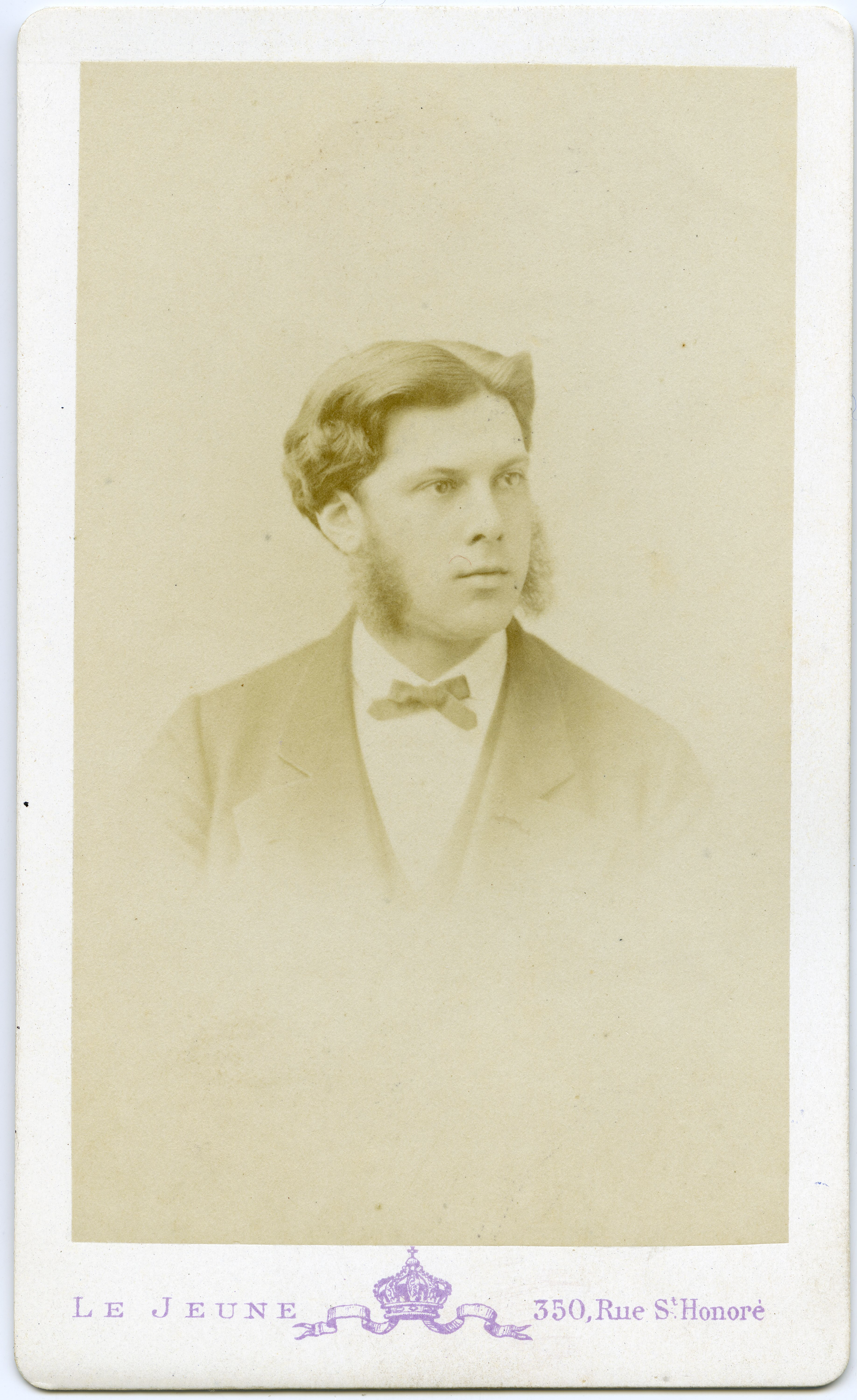
Carte de visite, c. 1874

Charles Henry Philippe Lévêque de Vilmorin (26 February 1843, Paris – 23 August 1899) was a French botanist and grandfather of the novelist, poet and journalist, Louise de Vilmorin. Seven generations of the family of Vilmorin contributed greatly to French agriculture for over two hundred and thirty years by their improvements of sugar-beet and wheat - they produced numerous varieties of wheat and published more than three hundred and sixty articles on plants in agriculture, horticulture, floriculture and botany.

== Life and work ==
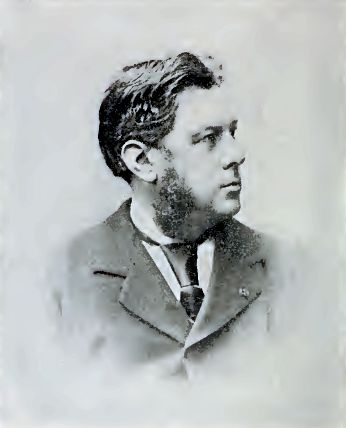

The Vilmorin seed company was established by Henry's ancestors Philippe Victoire de Vilmorin (1746-1804) and Pierre Andrieux (1713–1780), chief seed supplier and botanist (botaniste du roi) to King Louis XV, revived an old seed-growing firm and named it Vilmorin-Andrieux in 1774. Henry was the son of Pierre François "Louis" Lévêque de Vilmorin (1816-1860) and Elisa Bailly (1826-1868). Henry headed the family firm from 1866 to 1899 and was more interested in the business and economics than his father who had interests in theoretical genetics. Unlike his father, Henry believed in the transmission of acquired characters. Henry was the first to hybridise wheat. As a result, he introduced 18 strains of high-yield wheat while continuing his father’s work on the breeding of sugar beets, and publishing Les meilleurs blés ('The Best Wheat') in 1880 with descriptions of the best winter and spring wheat varieties and their cultivation. This was followed by a supplement published by Vilmorin-Andrieux et Cie in 1909. He also produced a small book Flowers of the French Riviera and a number of catalogues of domesticated plants.

Hooker dedicated the 125th volume of Curtis's Botanical Magazine to him.

== Family ==
Family tree showing prominent members

Henry was married in 1869 to Louise Julie Darblay, the daughter of Jacques-Paul Darblay 1814-1854 and Marguerite-Julie Rousseau 1825-1896. They produced 7 children:

- Caroline Marie Julie Elisabeth Lévêque de Vilmorin 1870-1940
- Joseph Lévêque de Vilmorin 1872-1917
- Louise Marie Thérèse Lévêque de Vilmorin 1873-1967
- Jean Louis Marie Lévêque de Vilmorin 1876-1946
- Charles Claude Marie Marc Lévêque de Vilmorin 1880-1944
- Louis Lévêque de Vilmorin 1883-1944
- Paul Marie Vincent Lévêque de Vilmorin 1885-1940

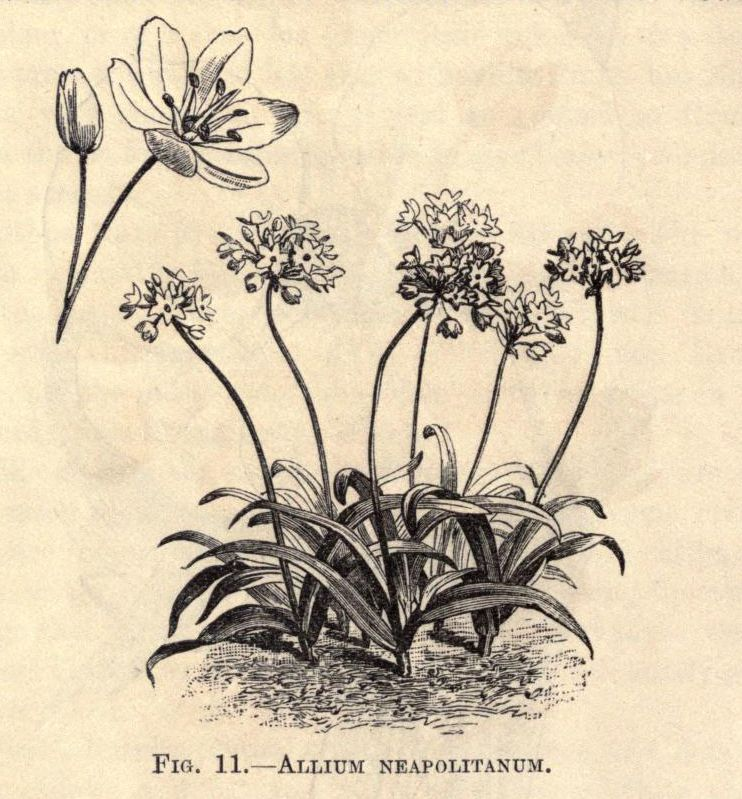
Allium neapolitanum

== Memberships ==
- Académie d'agriculture de France 28 February 1885
- Société botanique de France Life member (1860), President (1889)
- Société de l'histoire de Paris et de l'Île-de-France

== Publications ==
- Assainissement de la Seine. Épuration et utilisation des eaux d'égout. Commission d'études. Rapport de la première sous-commission chargée d'étudier les procédés de culture horticole à l'aide des eaux d'égout., 1878
- Les Blés à cultiver, conférence faite au congrès de l'Association nationale de la meunerie française, le 7 septembre 1887, à Paris (2e édition), suivie de l'Hiver de 1890-1891 et les blés, par Henry L. de Vilmorin, 1892
- Catalogue méthodique et synonymique des froments qui composent la collection de Henry L. de Vilmorin,.., 1889
- Le Chrysanthème, histoire, physiologie et culture en France et à l'étranger, 1896
- Les Cultures de betteraves faites à la colonie de Mettray sous la direction de la Société des agriculteurs de France en 1875, rapport présenté à l'Assemblée générale le 15 mars 1876, par M. Henry Vilmorin, 1876
- Exposition universelle internationale de 1878 à Paris, groupe V, classe 46. Rapport sur les produits agricoles non alimentaires, 1881
- Les Fleurs à Paris, culture et commerce, par Philippe L. de Vilmorin. Introduction par Henry L. de Vilmorin,..., 1892
- L'Hérédité chez les végétaux, 1890
- Les Légumes de grande culture, par M. Henry Lévêque de Vilmorin,., 1894
- Les légumes usuels, 1890
- Les Meilleures pommes de terre, conférence faite au Concours agricole général de Paris le 30 janvier 1888
- Les Meilleurs blés, description et culture des principales variétés de froments d'hiver et de printemps, 1880
- Note sur une expérience relative à l'étude de l'hérédité dans les végétaux, 1879
- Notice biographique sur Alphonse Lavallée, trésorier perpétuel de la Société nationale d'agriculture, 1886
- Les Plantes de grande culture : céréales, plantes fourragères, industrielles et économiques, 1892
- Syndicat des agriculteurs du Loiret, conférence du 24 octobre 1891, par M. H. de Vilmorin. Du Choix des blés de semence, des soins à leur donner
