= Nogent-sur-Vernisson =

- Commune
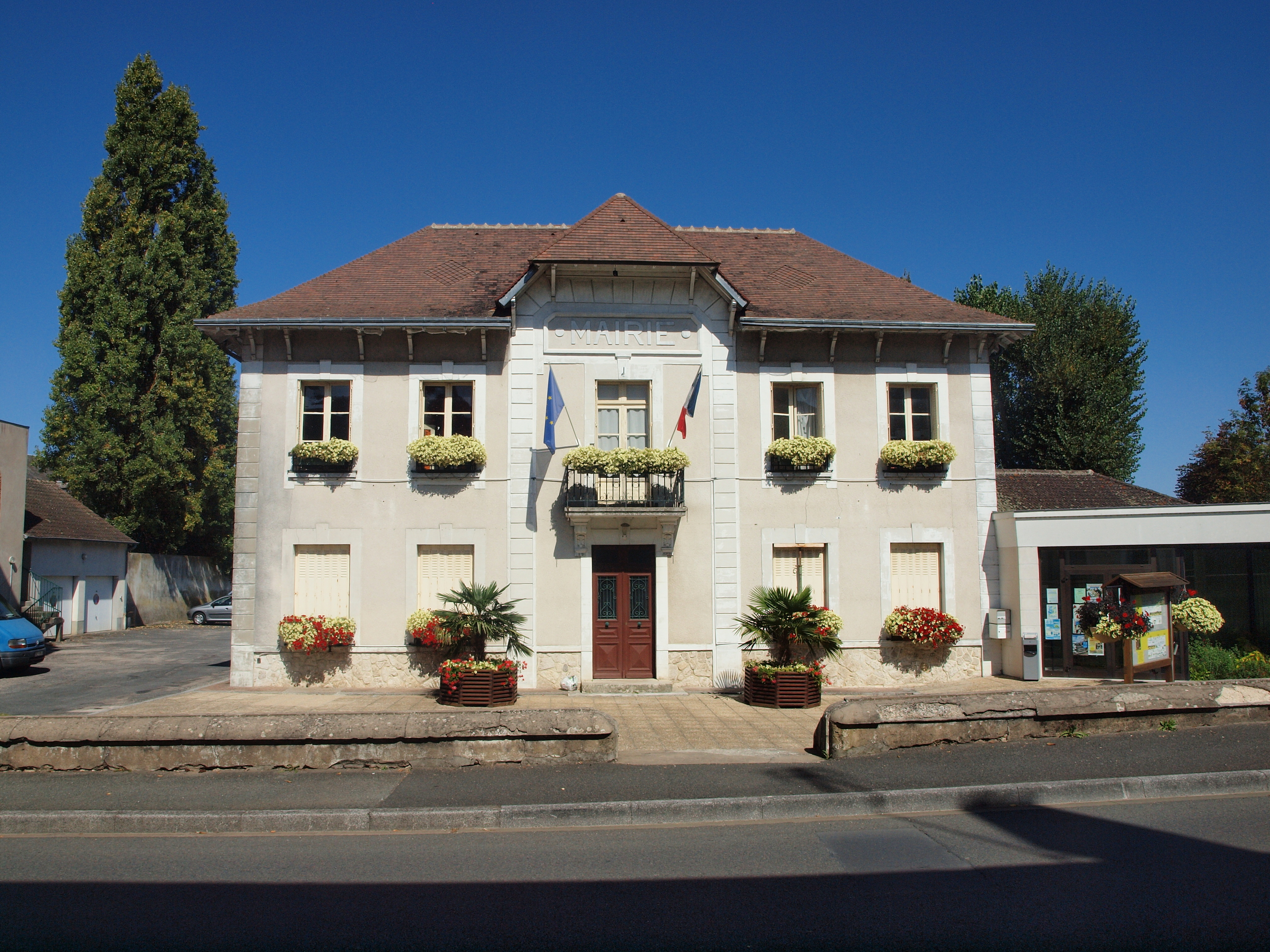
- Nogent-sur-Vernission Town Hall
- Location of Nogent-sur-Vernisson
- Location within France Location within Centre-Val de Loire
- Coordinates: 47°50′50″N 2°44′34″E
- Country: France
- Region: Centre-Val de Loire
- Department: Loiret
- Arrondissement: Montargis
- Canton: Lorris
- Intercommunality: Canaux et Forêts en Gâtinais

Government
  - Mayor (2020–2026): Philippe Moreau
- Area^{1}: 33.27 km^{2} (12.85 sq mi)
- Highest elevation: 150 m (490 ft)
- Lowest elevation: 109 m (358 ft)
- Population (2023): 2,559
  - Density: 76.92/km^{2} (199.2/sq mi)
- Demonym: Nogentais
- Time zone: UTC+01:00 (CET)
  - Summer (DST): UTC+02:00 (CEST)
- INSEE/Postal code: 45229 /45290
- Website: www.nogentsurvernisson.fr
- ^{1} French Land Register data, which excludes lakes, ponds, glaciers > 1 km^{2} (0.386 sq mi or 247 acres) and river estuaries.

Nogent-sur-Vernisson (French pronunciation: [nɔʒɑ̃ syʁ vɛʁnisɔ̃]) is a commune in the eastern part of the Loiret department in the Centre-Val de Loire region central-north France.

The main employer in the town is the CIMRG plant which manufactures components for Renault cars and employs some 800 people. Nogent-sur-Vernisson station has rail connections to Montargis, Nevers and Paris.

Nogent-sur-Vernisson is the site of the Arboretum national des Barres, adjacent to which is a division of the research agency Irstea (formerly Cemagref), which works to conserve the genetic resources of native trees.

The town has a 12th-century AD church of St Martin in which Pope Pius VII celebrated Mass while on his way to the coronation of Napoleon Bonaparte in 1804. There are also remains of walls from Roman times.

== Population ==
Historical population
Year	Pop.	±% p.a.
1968	1,756	—
1975	2,016	+1.99%
1982	2,414	+2.61%
1990	2,357	−0.30%
1999	2,443	+0.40%
2007	2,526	+0.42%
2012	2,593	+0.52%
2017	2,556	−0.29%
2023	2,559	+0.02%
Source: INSEE

== Points of interest ==
- Arboretum national des Barres

== Twin towns ==
- Castleblayney in County Monaghan, Ireland

== Gallery ==
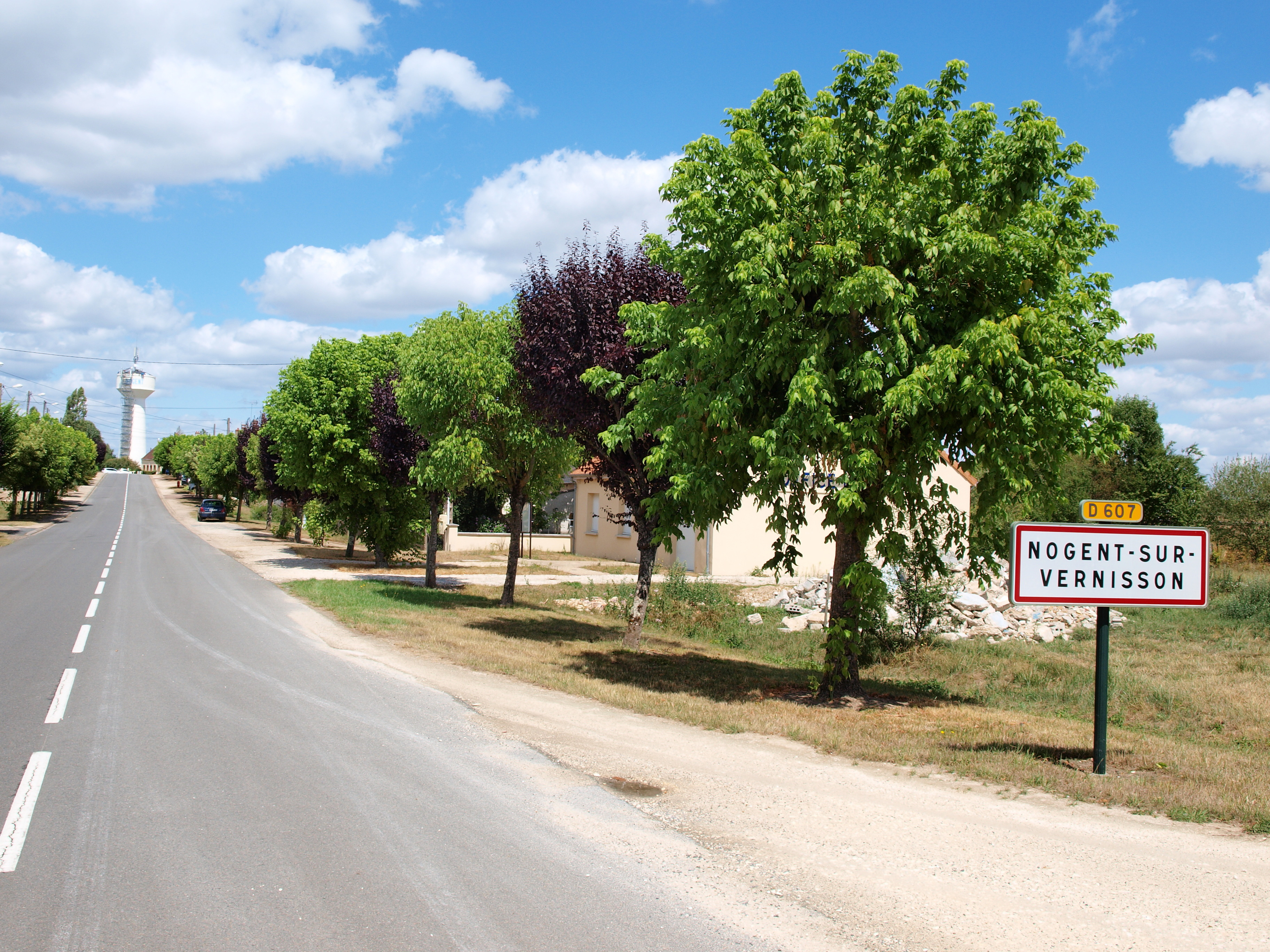
Town entrance

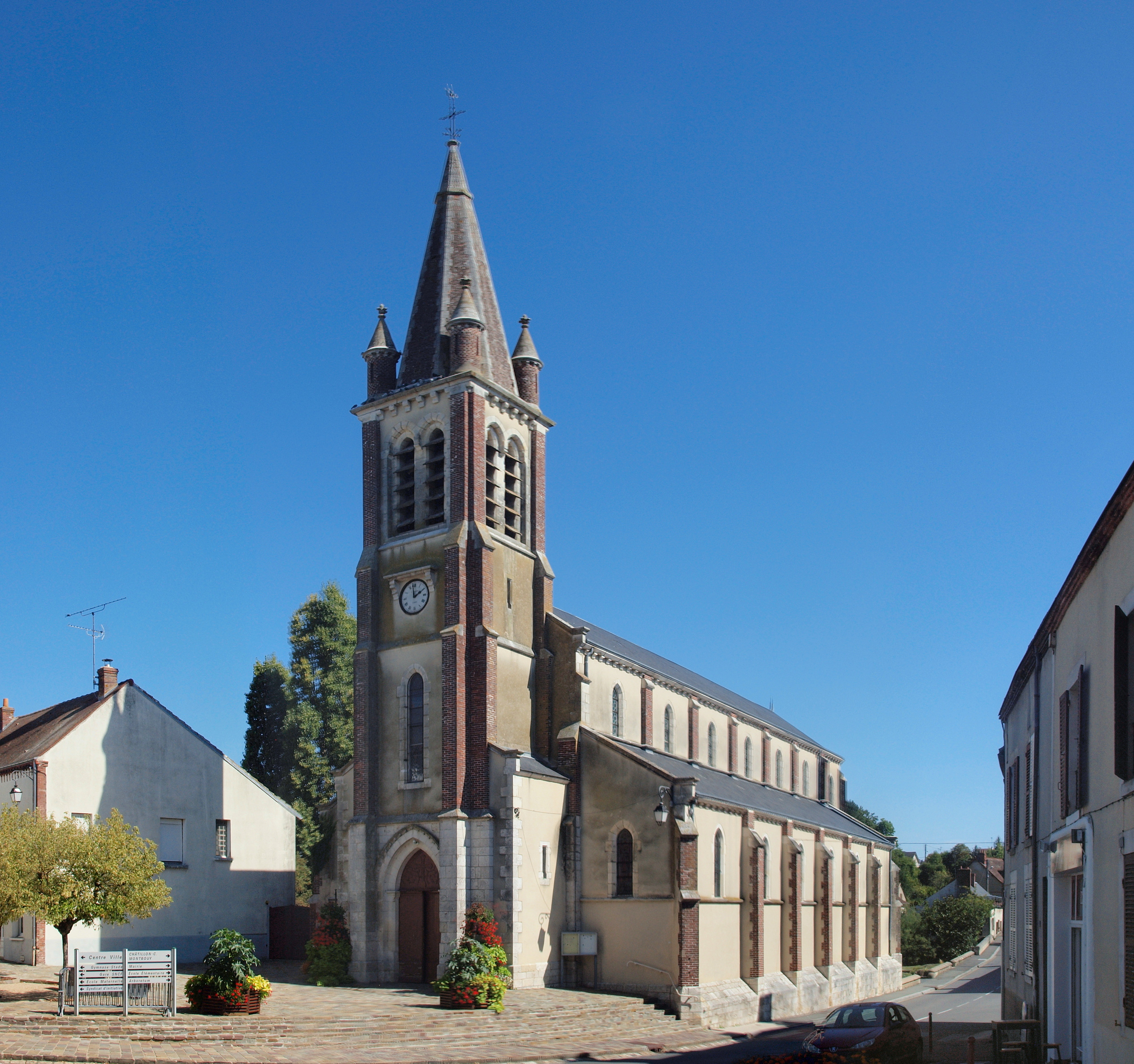
Church

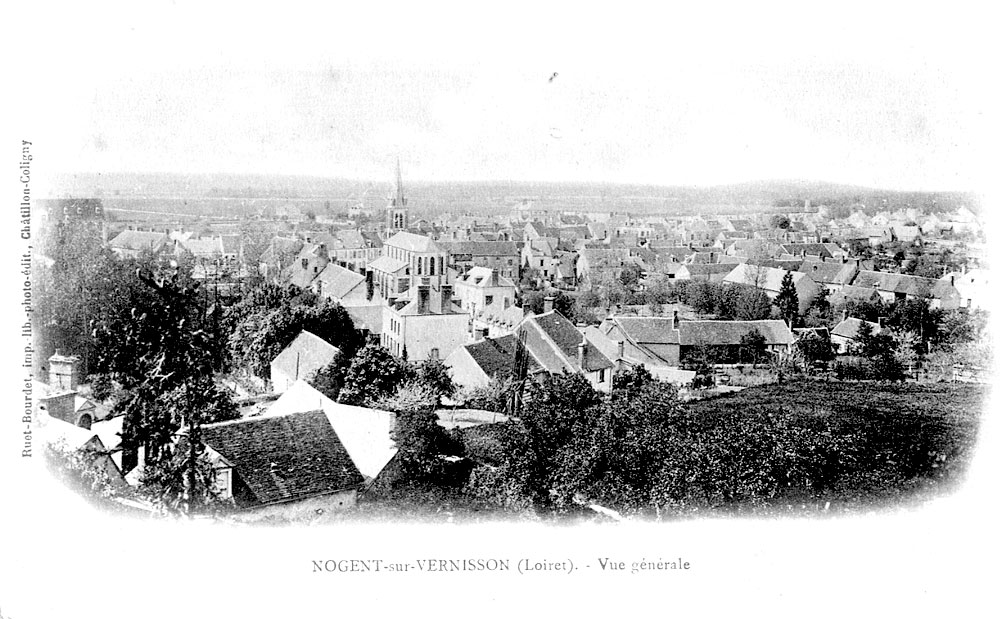
General view of the town on an old postcard

== See also ==
- Communes of the Loiret department
