= Arboretum national des Barres =

National arboretum in Centre-Val de Loire, France

Coordinates: 47°50′10″N 2°45′26″E

- Interactive map of Arboretum national des Barres
- Type: Arboretum
- Location: Nogent-sur-Vernisson, Loiret, Centre-Val de Loire, France.
- Area: 35 hectares (86 acres)

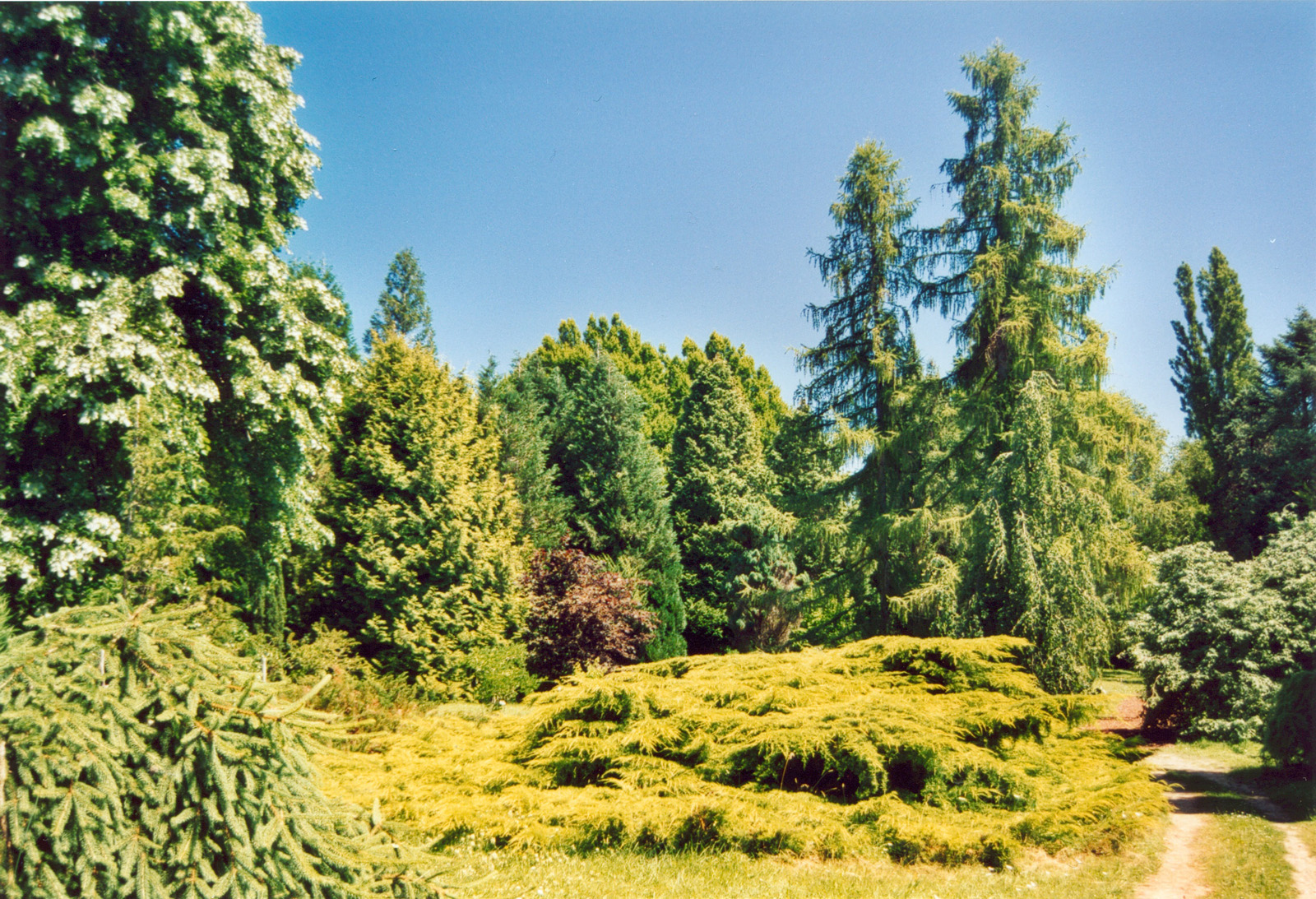
Arboretum national des Barres

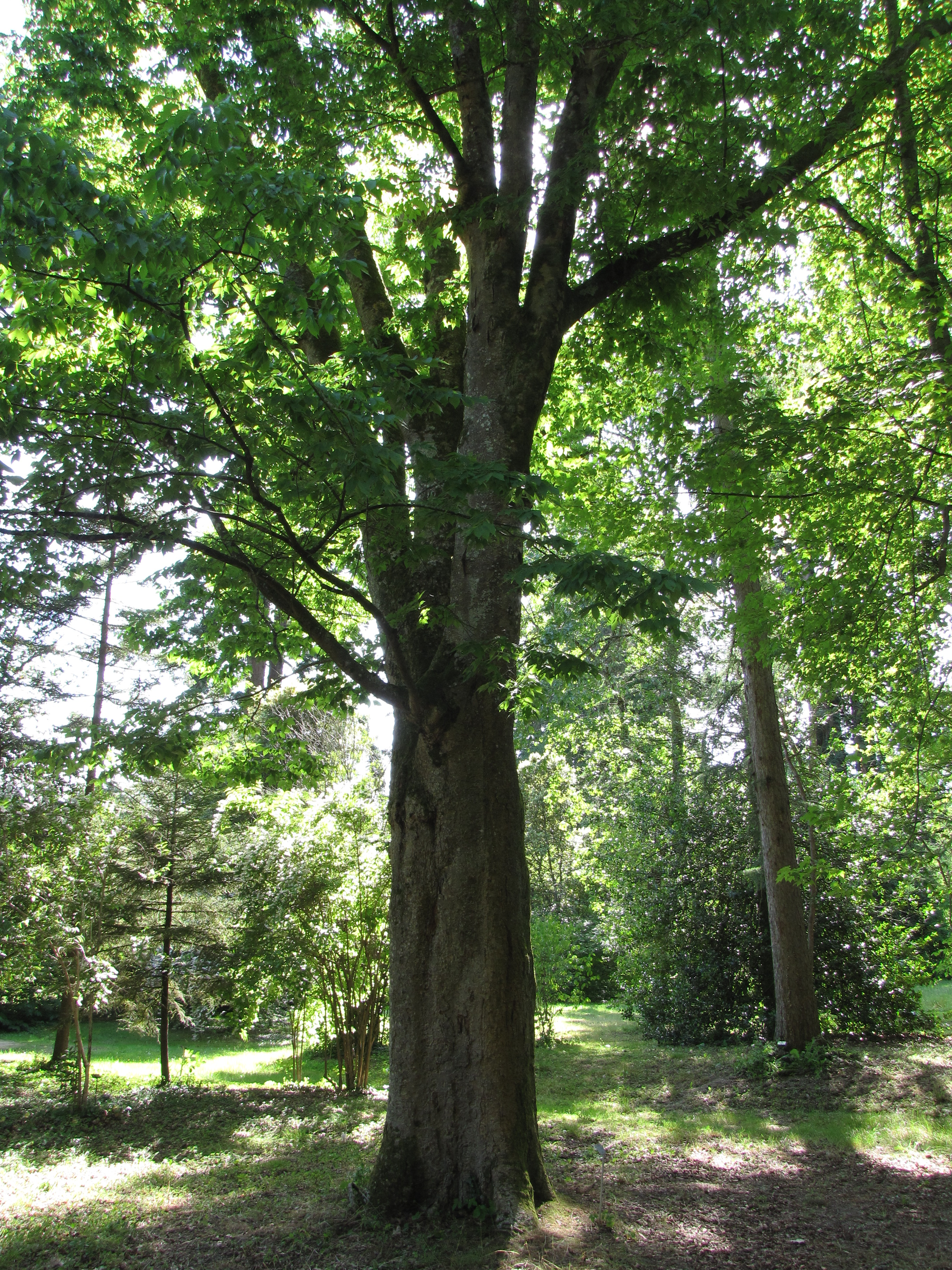
Japanese zelkova planted in 1894

The Arboretum national des Barres (35 hectares) is a national arboretum located in Nogent-sur-Vernisson, Loiret, Centre-Val de Loire, France. It is open daily in the warmer months; an admission fee is charged. Closure is planned for the end of year 2018 because subsidy from local and national government is too short.

The Domaine des Barres (283 hectares) was purchased in 1821 by Philippe André de Vilmorin for his studies in forestry. At that time it was almost entirely barren of trees, but Vilmorin planted today's extensive forest, primarily of Pinus sylvestris, P. laricio, and P. pinaster, as well as American oaks.

In 1866 his heirs sold 67 hectares to the nation, on which was established a forestry school, and in 1873 Constant Gouet, the arboretum's first director, began the geographic collection on 3 hectares. The Vilmorin family continued to be actively involved, particularly Maurice de Vilmorin, whose shrub collection was given to the state in 1921 following his death.

Director Léon Pardé greatly expanded the arboretum between 1919–1934, primarily by addition of specimens from the Far East. Systematic collections and an ornamental collection were begun in 1894 and 1941 respectively. The arboretum opened to the public in 1984 and in 2003 was designated a Jardin Remarquable by the French ministry of culture.

Today the arboretum contains about 9,250 specimens representing 2,700 species and varieties. It describes itself as one of the most complete European collections and one of the top ten arboreta in the world. Its extensive collections include oaks (109 species), hawthorns (92), maples (85), spruces (57), pines (54), and firs (44). Major sections of the arboretum are as follows:

- Geographic collections (established 1873) – trees grouped by place of origin. Euro-American collection has the oldest and largest specimens, including Sequoias and Thuja; Asian collection is noteworthy for its maples.
- Systematic collections (established 1894) – trees and shrubs grouped by botanical classification. Includes azalea, davidia, magnolia, wisteria, etc.
- Ornamental collection (established 1941) – ornamental plants, including twisted beeches, weeping cedars and sequoias, and creeping varieties of juniper.

== See also ==
- Arboretum de Pézanin
- Arboretum Vilmorin
- List of botanical gardens in France
