= Roger de Vilmorin =

French botanist and geneticist (1905–1980)

Roger de Vilmorin (Roger Marie Vincent Philippe Lévêque de Vilmorin; 12 September 1905 – 20 July 1980) was a French botanist and geneticist, as well as an illegitimate son of Alfonso XIII of Spain.

== Biography ==
Roger was born on 12 September 1905 in Paris, the natural son of Mélanie de Gaufridy de Dortan (1876–1937) and the King of Spain Alfonso XIII. However, he was recognized by his mother's legitimate husband, Philippe de Vilmorin, a well-known botanist and horticulturist.

Roger followed in his legal father's footsteps, becoming a botanist and geneticist himself.

Between 1926 and 1964 he directed the scientific services of Vilmorin & Cie, the family seed manufacturing company. In 1946 he became a member of the AAF (Académie d'agriculture de France), a public institution of which he was appointed director in 1961. He was also a member of the Société botanique de France, which he presided over in 1953–1954, and of the Comité international de nomenclature botanique from 1954 to 1972. Among the plant taxa he described as part of his botanical studies one may remember Gentiana ligustica.

== Honours ==
In 1990, Roger and his half-brother Olivier were included among the Righteous Among the Nations by the National Holocaust Remembrance Institute in Jerusalem because during the Second World War they saved some Jews from deportation to Auschwitz.

Roger de Vilmorin was an officer of the Order of Academic Palms and of the National Order of the Legion of Honour, Commander of the Order of Agricultural Merit and Knight of the National Order of Merit.

The Arboretum Vilmorin is dedicated to him and Philippe de Vilmorin.

== Selected works ==
- Guinochet, M; R Vilmorin. 1998. Flore de France (fasc. 1). Ed. Rolters Kluwer (DOIN). ISBN 978-2-7040-0286-3
- Guinochet, M; R Vilmorin. 1998. Flore de France (fasc. 2). Ed. Rolters Kluwer (DOIN). ISBN 978-2-7040-0287-0
- Guinochet, M; R Vilmorin. 1998. Flore de France (fasc. 3). Ed. Rolters Kluwer (DOIN). ISBN 978-2-7040-0302-0
- Guinochet, M; R Vilmorin. 1998. Flore de France (fasc. 4). Ed. Rolters Kluwer (DOIN). ISBN 978-2-222-02885-7

== Sources ==
- Gustave Heusé, Les Vilmorin (1746–1899): Philippe Victoire Levêque de Vilmorin (1746–1804); Pierre Philippe André Levêque de Vilmorin (1776–1862); Pierre Louis François Levêque de Vilmorin (1816–1860); Charles Philippe Henry Levêque de Vilmorin (1843–1899), Parigi : Librairie agricole de la Maison rustique, 1899.
- André Charpin, Gérard-Guy Aymonin (2004), Bibliographie sélective des Flores de France. V. Notices biographiques sur les auteurs cités : P-Z et compléments. Le Journal de botanique de la Société botanique de France, 27 : 47–87.
