= Philippe André de Vilmorin =

French horticulturist

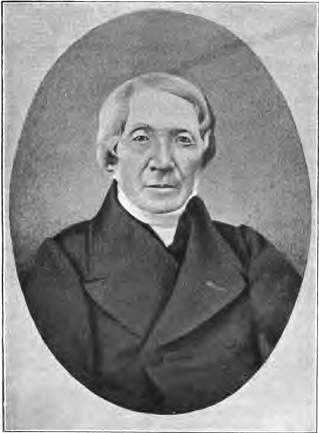
Philippe André de Vilmorin

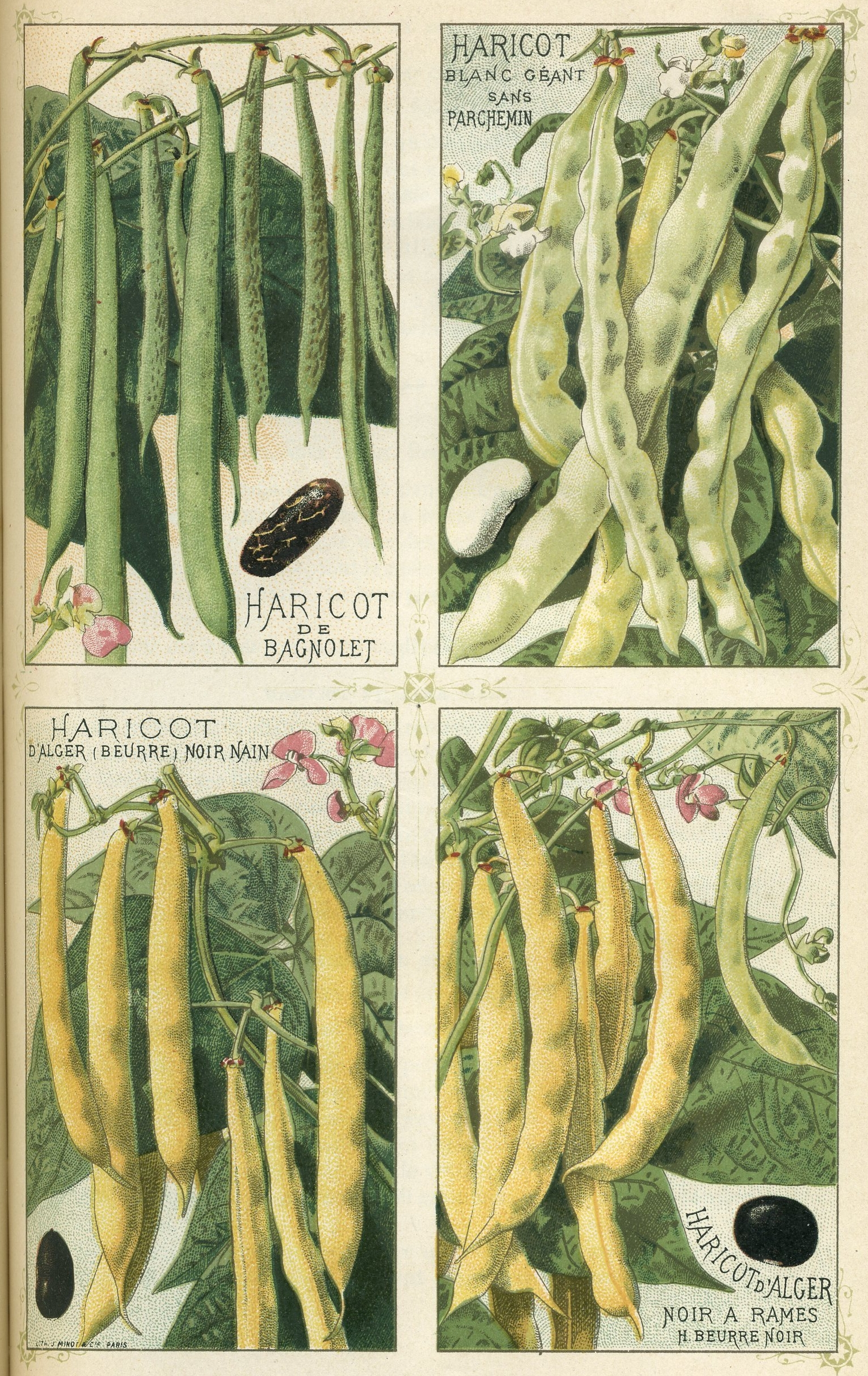
Illustration from Les plantes potagères, a catalog by Vilmorin-Andrieux et Cie, 1891

Pierre-Philippe-André Levêque de Vilmorin (November 30, 1776 – March 21, 1862), more commonly known as Philippe André de Vilmorin, was a French horticulturist.

Vilmorin was the oldest son of Philippe-Victoire Levêque de Vilmorin (1746–1804), founder of a commercial agricultural establishment, studied at the college of Pont-le-Voy and subsequently Paris, and became the company's head upon his father's death. His travels to England in 1810, 1814, and 1816 allowed him to see first-hand the advances in English plant cultivation for horticulture and agriculture, and furthered his active interest in cereals, vegetables, forestry, and ornamental and exotic plants. The London Society of Horticulture presented him with its grand medal in 1814 for his numerous articles on these subjects.

In 1815 Vilmorin established Vilmorin-Andrieux et Cie, which ultimately became one of the world's largest suppliers of plants, and acquired a former hunting lodge of Louis XIV just outside Paris, which he developed into the Arboretum Vilmorin. In 1821 he purchased the Domaine des Barres (283 hectares), upon which he created an experimental forest, parts of which have now become the Arboretum national des Barres. Vilmorin died at Barres on March 21, 1862.

== See also ==
- Arboretum national des Barres
- Arboretum Vilmorin
- Arboretum de Pézanin
- Louis de Vilmorin (1816–1860)
- Joseph-Marie-Philippe Lévêque de Vilmorin (1872–1917)
- Louise Leveque de Vilmorin (1902–1969)
