= Louise Lévêque de Vilmorin =

French writer (1902–1969)

Marie Louise Lévêque de Vilmorin (4 April 1902 – 26 December 1969), commonly known as Louise de Vilmorin, was a French novelist, poet and journalist. Vilmorin was best known as a writer of delicate but mordant tales, often set in aristocratic or artistic milieu.

== Early life ==
Louise's family blazon: Coat of arms of the Lévêque de Vilmorin family, an old French nobility whose members can trace their aristocratic lineage back to the early 14th century; Source: Henri Jougla de Morenas, Grand armorial de France, tome 4, page 453

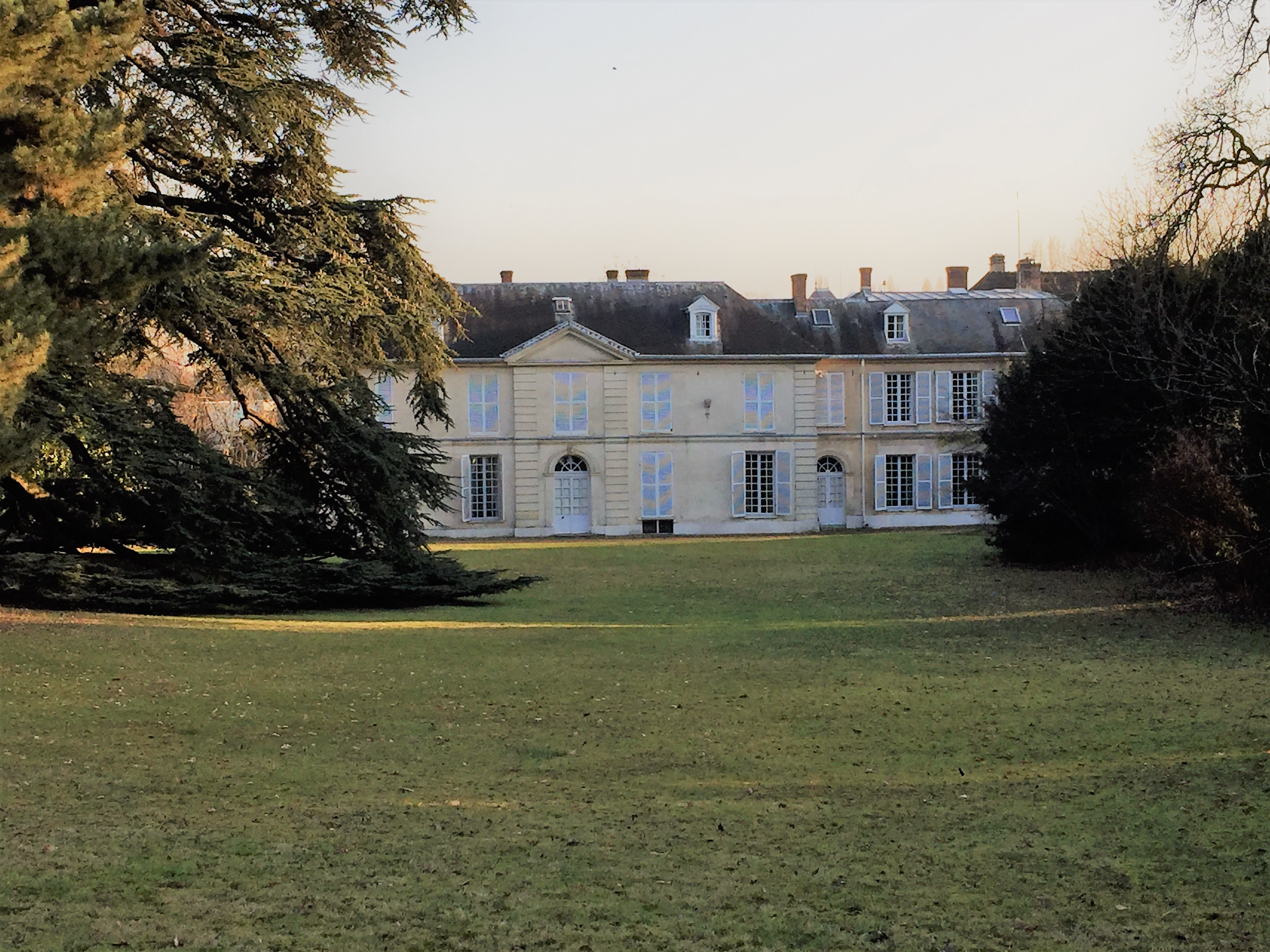
Château de Vilmorin (2016)

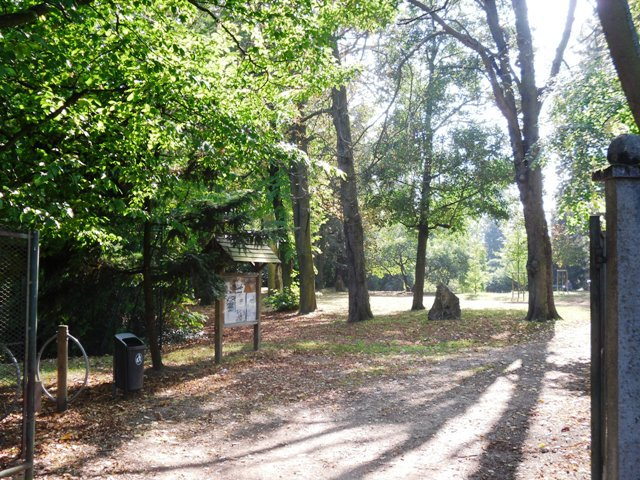
Square Louise-de-Vilmorin (2009)

Born 4 April 1902 in the family château at Verrières-le-Buisson, Essonne, a suburb southwest of Paris, she was heir to a great French seed company fortune, that of Vilmorin. She was afflicted with a slight limp that became a personal trademark.

Louise was the younger daughter of Philippe de Vilmorin (1872–1917) by his wife, Berthe Marie Mélanie de Gaufridy de Dortan (1876–1937), daughter of Roger de Gaufridy de Dortan (1843–1905) and his wife, Adélaïde de Verdonnet (1853–1918), all members of an old French nobility.

Her siblings included a sister, Marie "Mapie" Pierre (1901–1972), who married, as her first husband, a cousin, Guy Marie Félix Lévêque de Vilmorin (1896-1984) in 1922 (div. 1932) by whom she had three children. She married again in 1933, Guillaume de Toulouse-Lautrec-Montfa, comte de Toulouse-Lautrec (1902–1955), a relative of the painter Henri de Toulouse-Lautrec; by him she had further issue a son and a daughter. She became a popular food columnist in French magazines as Mapie de Toulouse-Lautrec. In addition, Louise had four brothers: Henry (1903–1961), Olivier (1904–1962), André (1907–1987), and Roger (1905–1980), who was fathered by Alfonso XIII of Spain.

== Career ==
Her most famous novel was Madame de..., published in 1951, which was adapted into the celebrated film The Earrings of Madame de... (1953), directed by Max Ophüls and starring Charles Boyer, Danielle Darrieux and Vittorio de Sica. Vilmorin's other works included Juliette, La lettre dans un taxi, Les belles amours, Saintes-Unefois, and Intimités. Her letters to Jean Cocteau were published after the death of both correspondents. She was awarded the Renée Vivien prize for women poets in 1949.

Francis Poulenc literally sang her praises, considering her an equal to Paul Éluard and Max Jacob, found in her writing "a sort of sensitive impertinence, libertinage, and an appetite which, carried on into song [is] what I tried to express in my extreme youth with Marie Laurencin in Les Biches". (Ivry 1996)

== Relationships ==
As a young woman, in 1923, she had been engaged to novelist and aviator Antoine de Saint-Exupéry; however, the engagement was called off, even though Saint-Exupéry gave up flying for a while after her family protested such a risky occupation. Vilmorin's first husband was an American real-estate heir, Henry Leigh Hunt (1886–1972), the only son of Leigh S. J. Hunt, a businessman who once owned much of Las Vegas, Nevada by his wife, Jessie Noble. They married in 1925 (1924 according to other sources), moved to Las Vegas, and divorced in the 1930s. They had three daughters:

- Jessie Leigh Hunt (b. 3 February 1929, Hauts-de-Seine, Neuilly-sur-Seine not 1928 as misreported). She married in 1951 (divorced by 1962) Albert Cabell Bruce Jr. (b. 11 August 1925), only son of Albert Cabell Bruce (nephew of William Cabell Bruce) by his wife, Helen Eccleston Whitridge (granddaughter of Gov. Oden Bowie), by whom she had issue, four sons: Cabell, Leigh, Thomas, and James, all born 1952–1959 in Midland, Texas. She then married Clement Biddle Wood, an editor of The Paris Review, in 1965.
- Alexandra Leigh Hunt (b. 1 April 1930, Hauts-de-Seine, Neuilly-sur-Seine) married Henry Ridgeley Horsey (b. 18 October 1924, Dover, Delaware, USA). Her children were Henry Ridgely Horsey Jr., Edmond Philip de Vilmorin Horsey, Alexandra Thérèse Leigh-Hunt Horsey, Randall Revell Horsey, Philippa Ridgely Horsey,
- Helena Leigh Hunt (23 June 1931, Hauts-de-Seine, Neuilly-sur-Seine – 28 December 1995, Southampton Hospital, Long Island, New York, aged 64), a realist still-life painter. She was married (div) to John Tracy Baxter (b. 23 August 1926, Macon, Georgia), with whom according to the New York obituary, she had three daughters, Elizabeth Baxter, Etienne Baxter, and Leigh Baxter (Mrs Warre).

Her second husband was Count Paul Pálffy ab Erdöd (1890–1968), a much-married Austrian-born Hungarian playboy, who had been second husband to the Hungarian countess better known as Etti Plesch, owner of two Epsom Derby winners. Palffy married Louise as his fifth wife in 1938, but the couple soon divorced.

Vilmorin was the mistress of another of Etti Plesch's husbands, Count Maria Thomas Paul Esterházy de Galántha (1901–1964), who left his wife in 1942 for Vilmorin. They never married. For a number of years, she was the mistress of Duff Cooper, British ambassador to France. Louise spent the last years of her life as the companion of the French Cultural Affairs Minister and author André Malraux, calling herself "Marilyn Malraux".

== Death and legacy ==
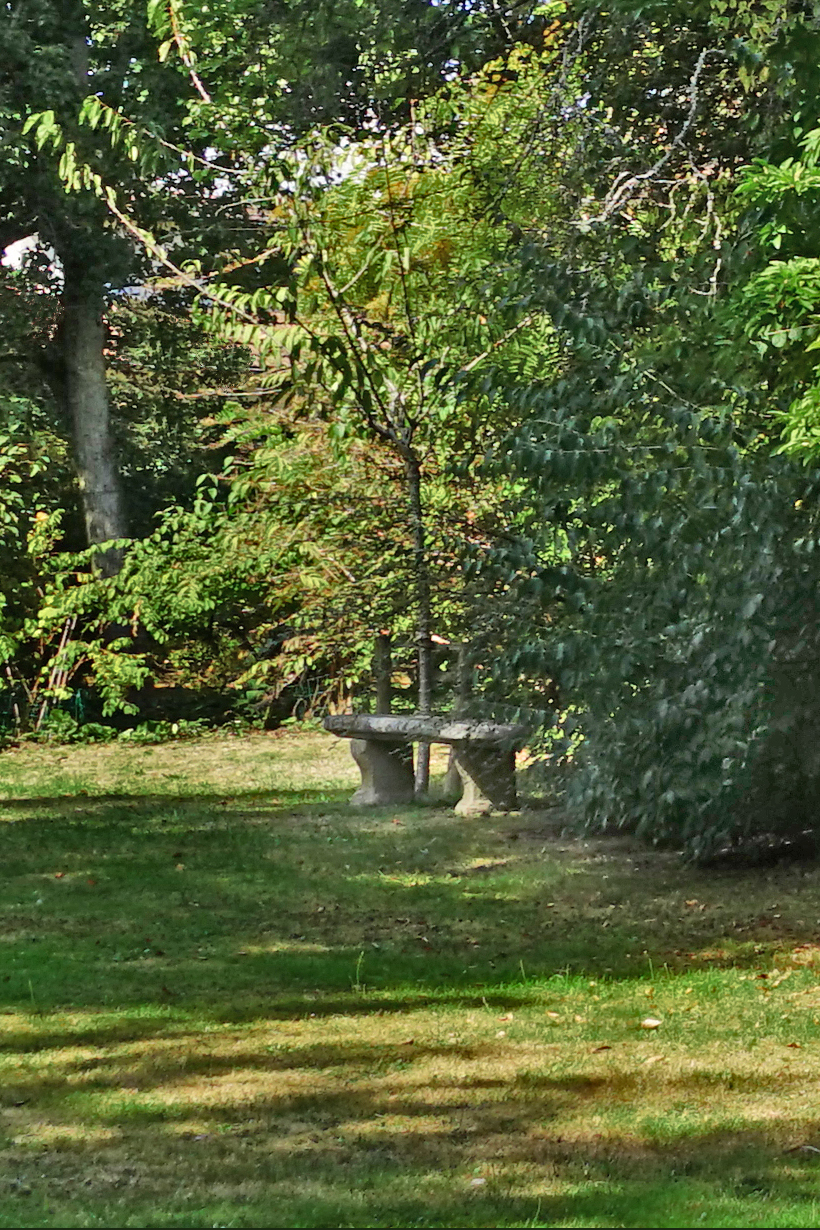
Tomb of Louise de Vilmorin (2018)

Louise de Vilmorin died 26 December 1969. She is memorialised in placenames across France, including in Limeil-Brévannes, Mantes-la-Jolie, Draveil, Saint-Pierre-du-Perray, Mennecy and Avrainville.

== In popular culture ==
She was a significant character in Antonio Iturbe’s 2017 Spanish language novel A cielo abierto which was translated into English and published in 2021 with the title The Prince of the Skies.

== See also ==
- Philippe André de Vilmorin (1776–1862)
- Louis de Vilmorin (1816–1860)
- Le Lit à colonnes (1942 film)
- Julietta (1953 film)
- The Lovers (1958 film) (1958 film)
