= Elisa Bailly de Vilmorin =

French horticulturalist (1826–1868)

- Born: May 3, 1826
- Died: August 5, 1868 (aged 42)
- Known for: Her work as a horticulturist and plant breeder
- Spouse: Louis de Vilmorin
- Scientific career
- Fields: Horticulture, plant breeding
- Author abbrev. (botany): E.Vilm.

Elisa Bailly de Vilmorin (3 May 1826 – 5 August 1868) was a French horticulturist and plant breeder. She was married to Louis de Vilmorin.

The standard author abbreviation E.Vilm. is used to indicate this person as the author when citing a botanical name.
