= Arboretum de Pézanin =

Arboretum in Dompierre-les-Ormes, Bourgogne, France

Coordinates: 46°20′53″N 4°28′50″E

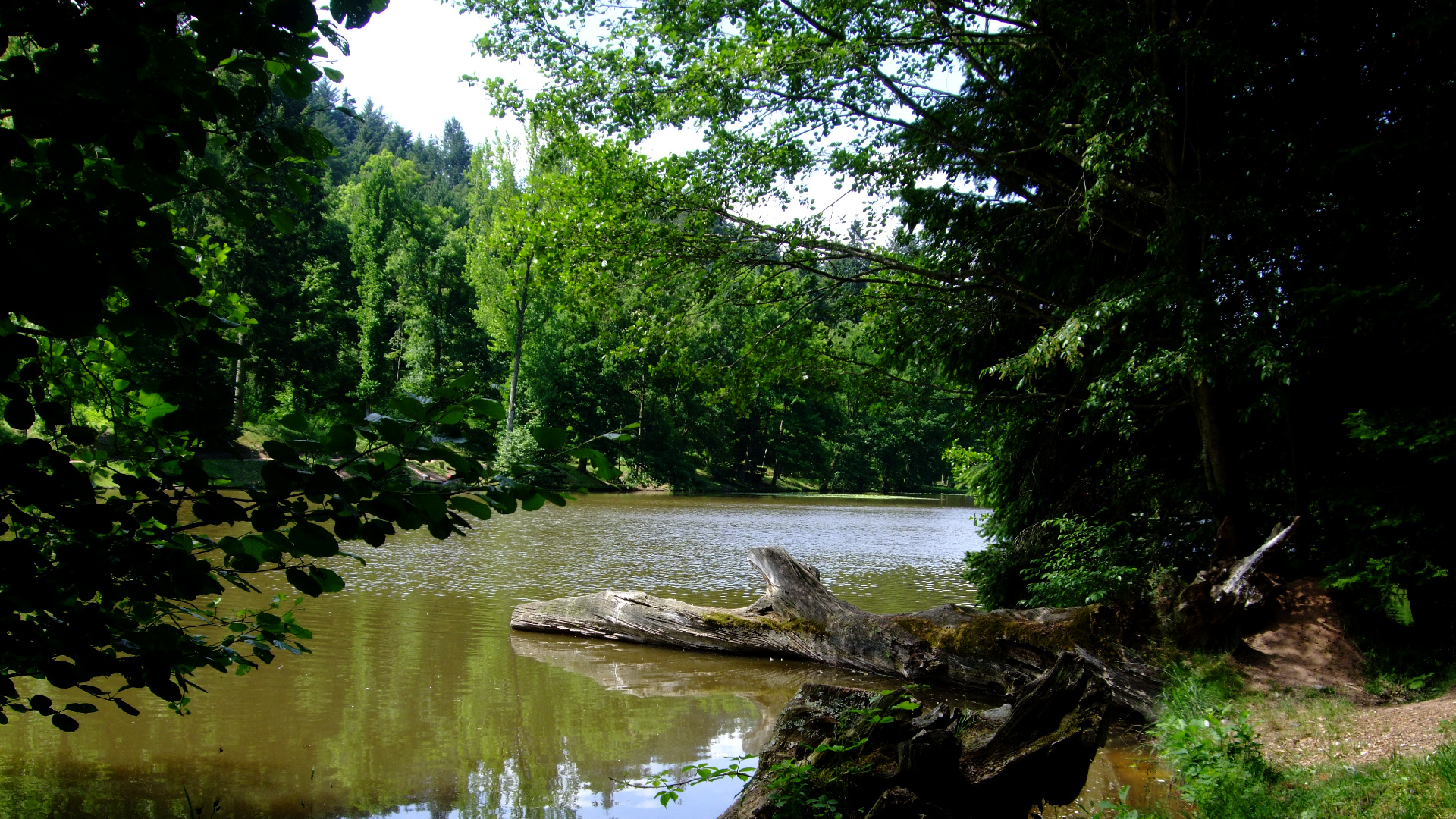
Arboretum de Pézanin

The Arboretum de Pézanin or Arboretum Domanial de Pézanin (Federal Arboretum of Pézanin) is an arboretum located in Dompierre-les-Ormes, Saône-et-Loire, Bourgogne, France. It is one of the oldest and richest forest collections in France, with trees and plants from all around the world.

== History ==
The arboretum was established in 1903 by the famous French botanist Philippe de Vilmorin (1872–1917), seigneur of Audour. He created the arboretum around the lake on his estate at Pézanin. Between 1903 and 1923, over 1100 species were planted, mainly from North America and Asia.

After that, it fell into a period of abandonment until it was acquired by the state in 1935. It is now owned by the French Ministry of Agriculture and managed by the Office national des Forêts (ONF).

Although the arboretum was damaged by storms in 1981 and 1999, it has recently undergone renewed plantings. Today it contains more than 450 species of trees, with walking paths and a pond.

There is also a geocaching sudocache.

== The arboretum ==
=== Description ===
The ONF wants to open the arboretum to a large audience, and creates walking paths and puts tags on each trees to indicate species, and other useful information.

The arboretum is partly accessible to disabled people: the trail around the lake was specially made to allow their access. There is a forest house, a picnic area and parking inside and outside the site.

=== Access ===
The arboretum is accessible through the RCEA (Route Centre Europe Atlantique), exit Dompierre-les-Ormes, at 20 minutes from Mâcon (motorway of the sun, train and TGV station, A40 autoroute,...), 1 hour from Lyon and 2 hour from Geneva.

=== The Lab71 ===
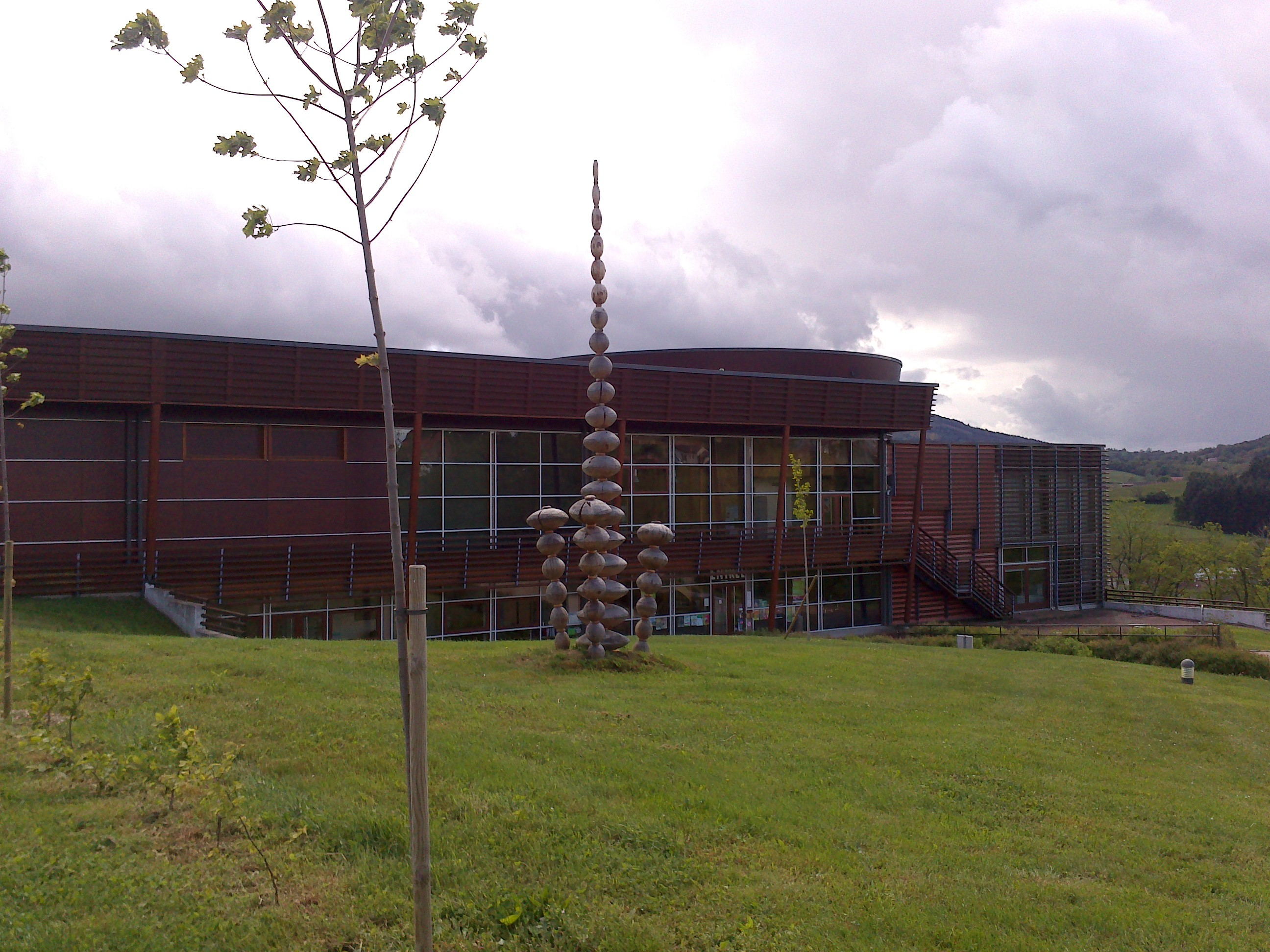
The Lab71

Since 2004, the site of Pézanin has been completed by the Lab71 located two minutes from the arboretum. The Lab is an exhibition and education site.

Throughout the season, the Lab organizes themed events and conferences. It aims through fun and educational activities set in temporary exhibitions to encourage visitors to discover and touch wood or to take a stroll or a deer walk through the exceptional setting of the forest.

== Gallery ==
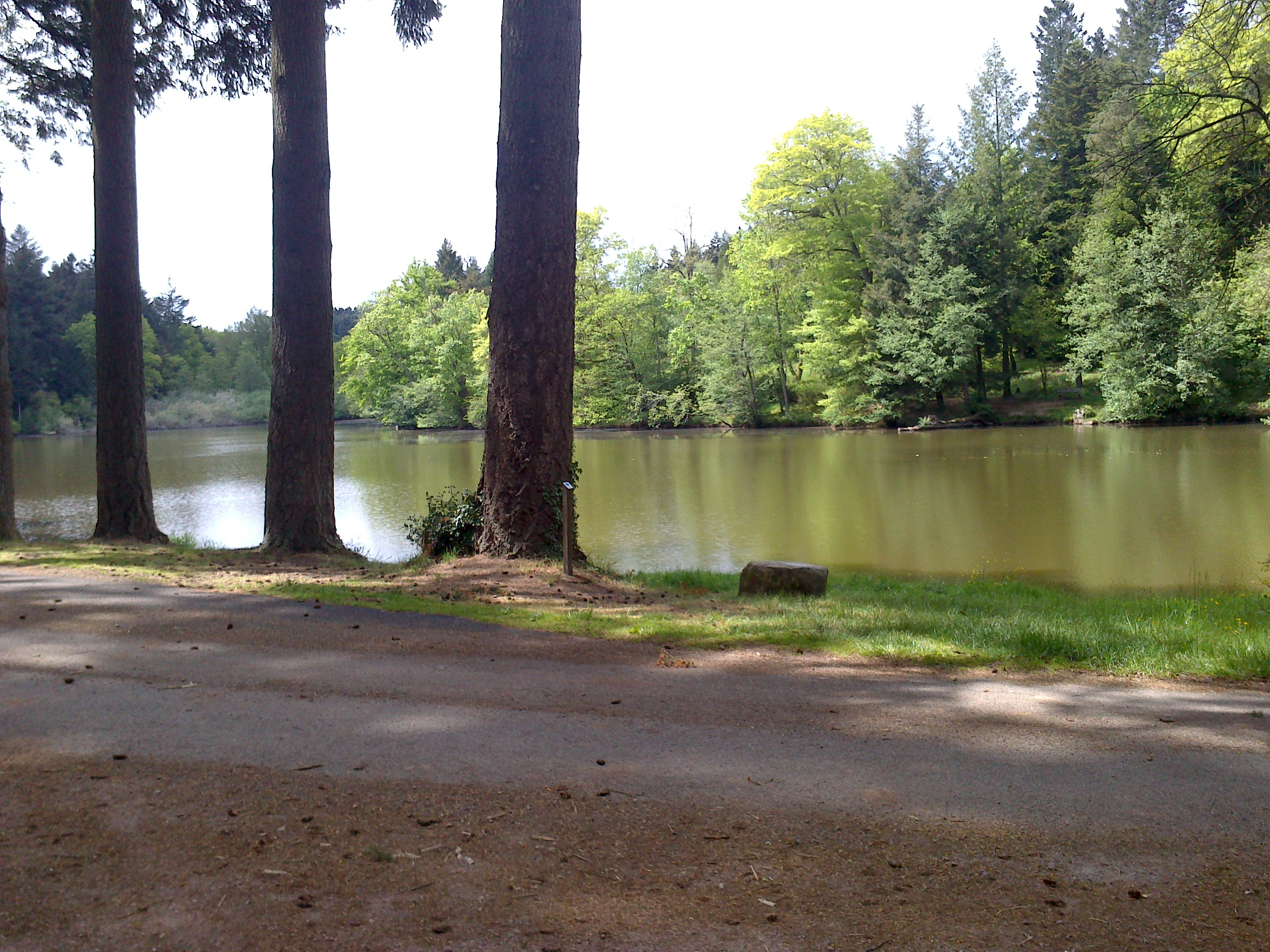
Pézanin in 2014

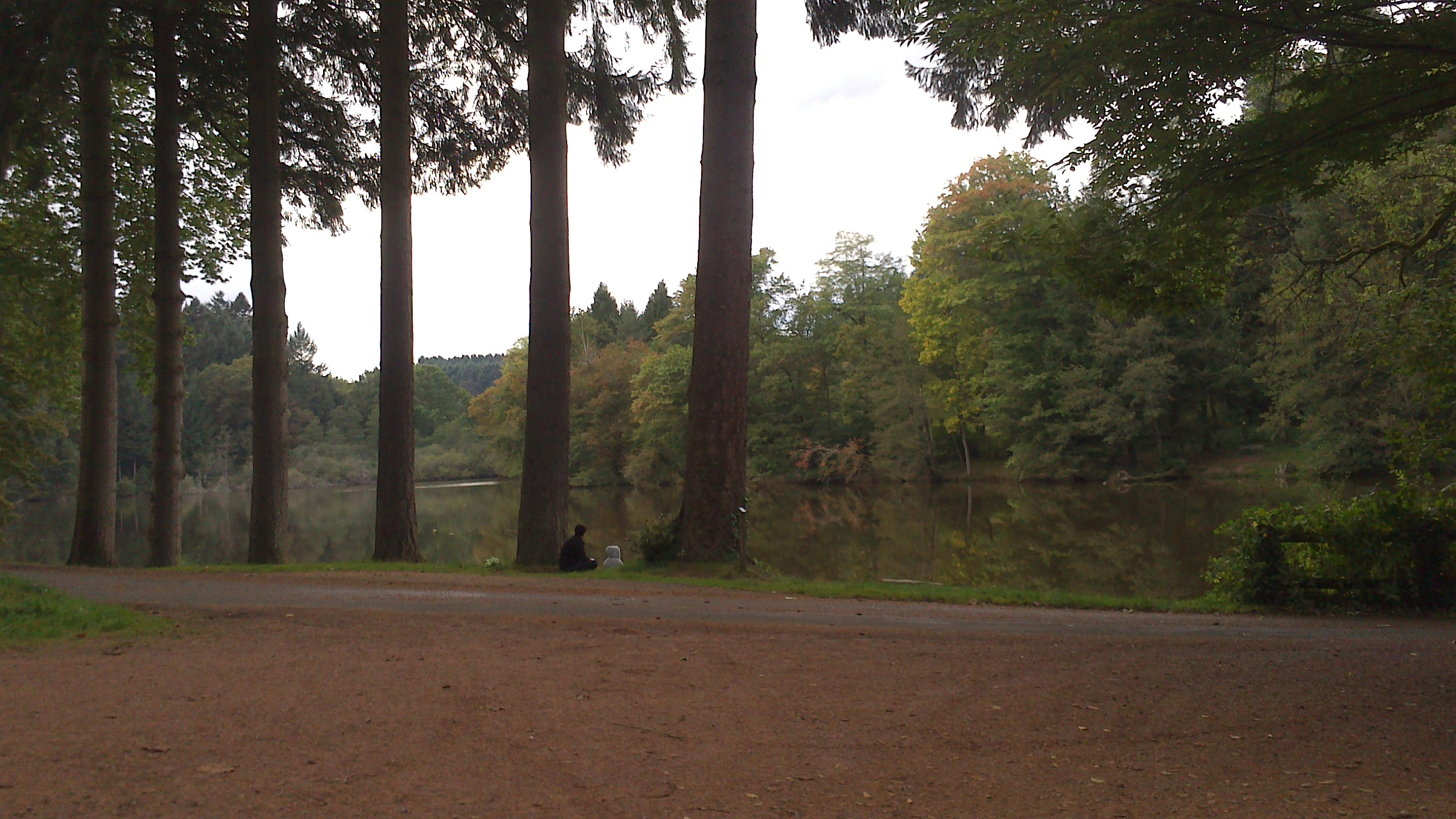
Arboretum de Pézanin in autumn

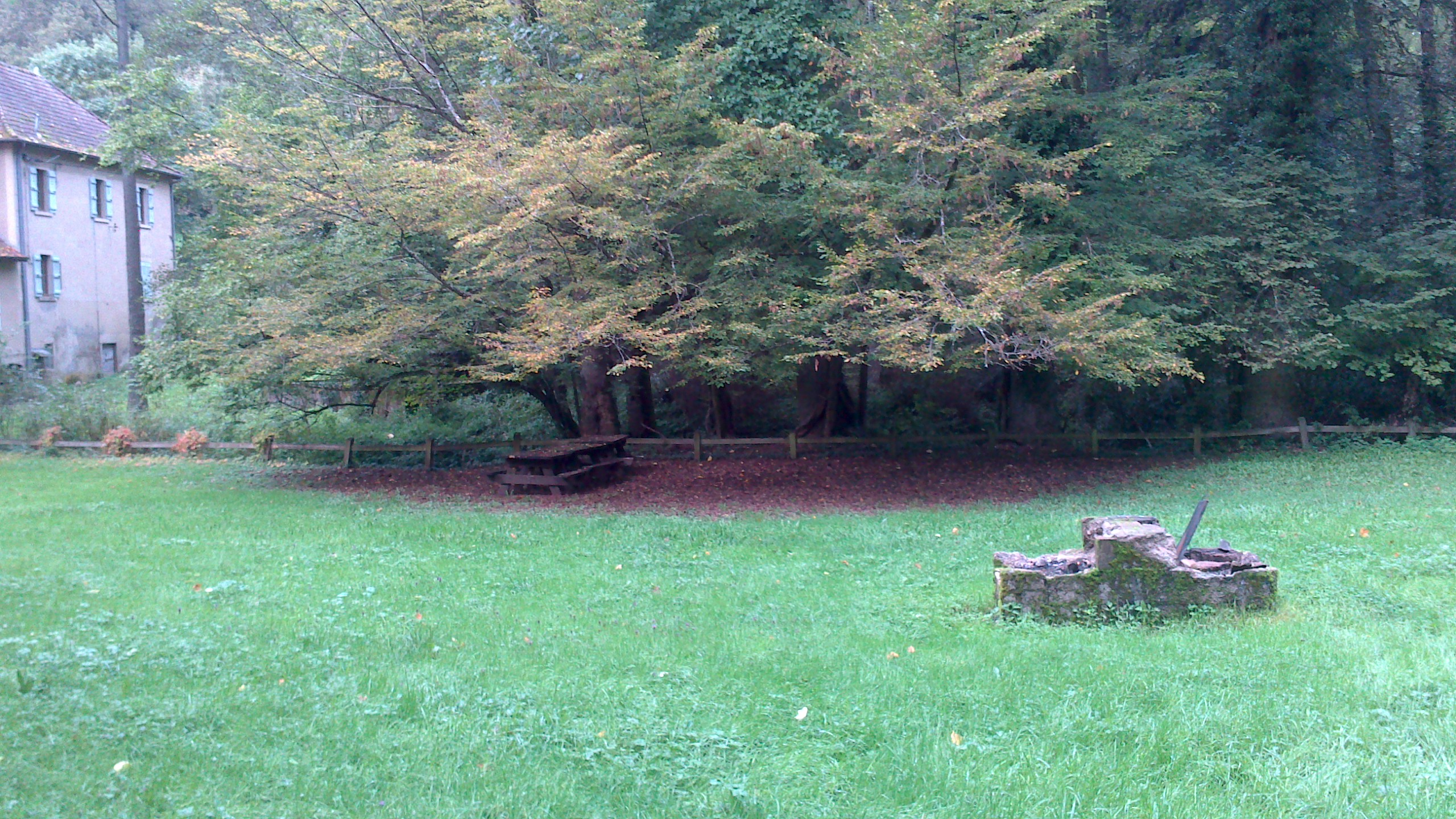
Picnic area of Pézanin

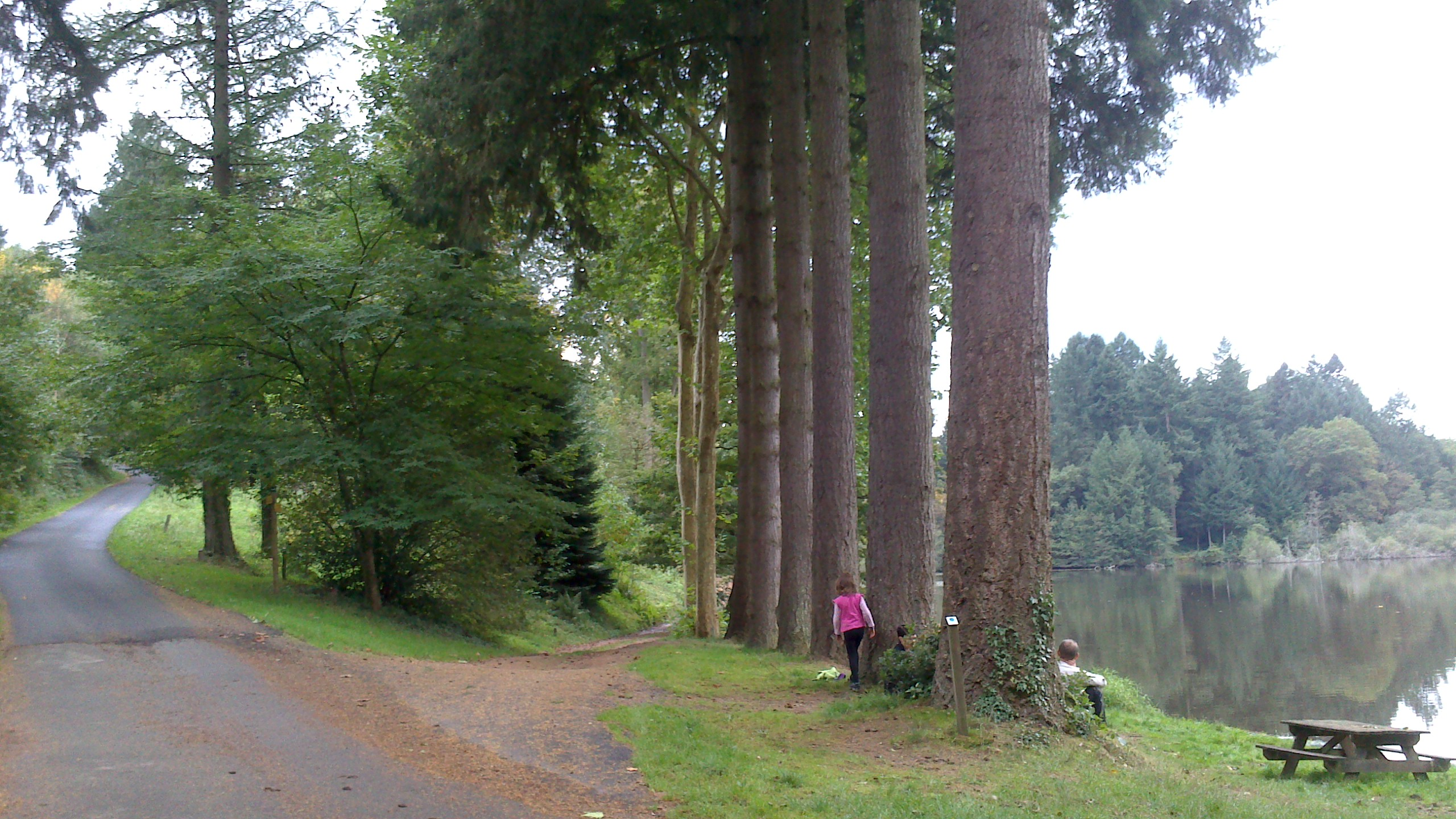
Arboretum de Pézanin

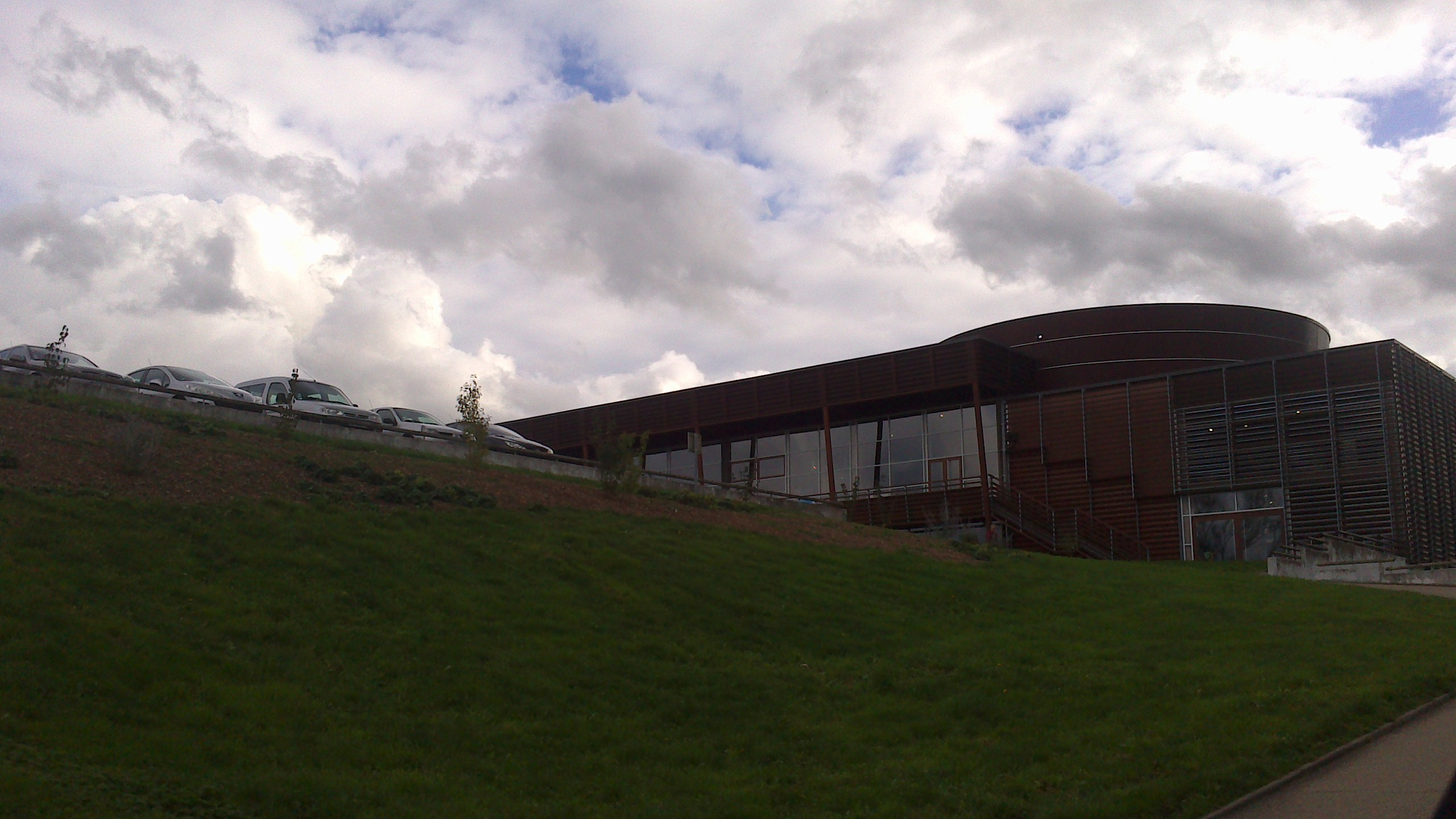
La Galerie Européenne de la Forêt et du Bois

== See also ==
- Arboretum national des Barres (around 2,600 species of trees and bushes)
- Arboretum Vilmorin
- List of botanical gardens in France
- Dompierre-les-Ormes
