= Arboretum Vilmorin =

Private arboretum in Essonne, Île-de-France, France

Coordinates: 48°45′0″N 2°16′6″E

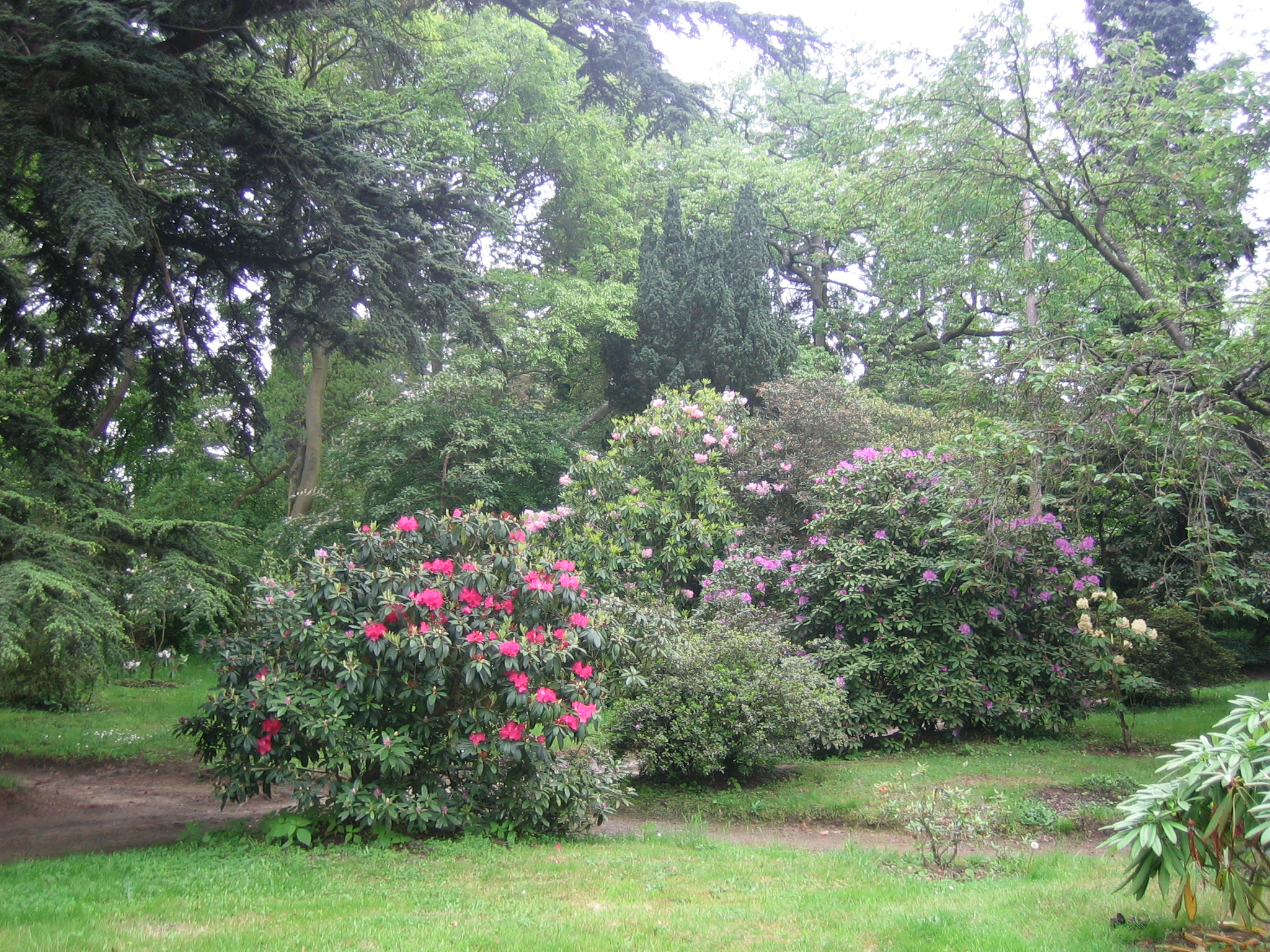
Arboretum Vilmorin

The Arboretum Vilmorin (4 hectares) is a private arboretum located at 2 rue d'Estienne d'Orves, Verrières-le-Buisson, Essonne, Île-de-France, France. It is open by appointment only. A newer portion of the family arboretum was acquired by the municipality in 1975, and is now open to the public as the Arboretum municipal de Verrières-le-Buisson.

The arboretum is located on the site of a former hunting lodge of Louis XIV, acquired in 1815 by Philippe-André de Vilmorin (1776-1862), who also began today's Arboretum national des Barres in 1821. He transformed the lodge's grounds into a collection of trees and shrubs from around the world as missionaries and explorers sent specimens from the Far East, America, North Africa, Siberia, and the Caucasus. Plans for the arboretum walls are attributed to André Le Nôtre.

Today's arboretum has been tended by seven generations of the Vilmorin family, assisted in recent years by a scientific committee. At present the arboretum contains some 2,280 identified species, with major collections of Acer, Berberis, Deutzia, Euonymus, Malus, Lonicera, Philadelphus, Quercus, and Rhododendron. Specimens of interest include Carya buckleyi, Cedrus libani, Chionanthus retusus, Halesia diptera, Juglans x intermedia, Parrotia persica, Pinus bungeana, Pseudolarix amabilis, Quercus persica, Sorbus torminalis, Taxodium ascendens, and Torreya grandis.

== See also ==
- Arboretum de Pézanin
- Arboretum national des Barres
- List of botanical gardens in France
