= Verrières-le-Buisson =

Commune in Île-de-France, France

- Commune
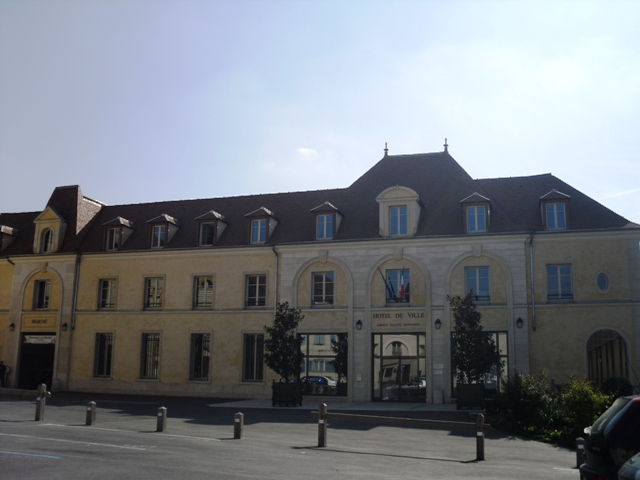
- The town hall in Verrières-le-Buisson

- Coat of arms

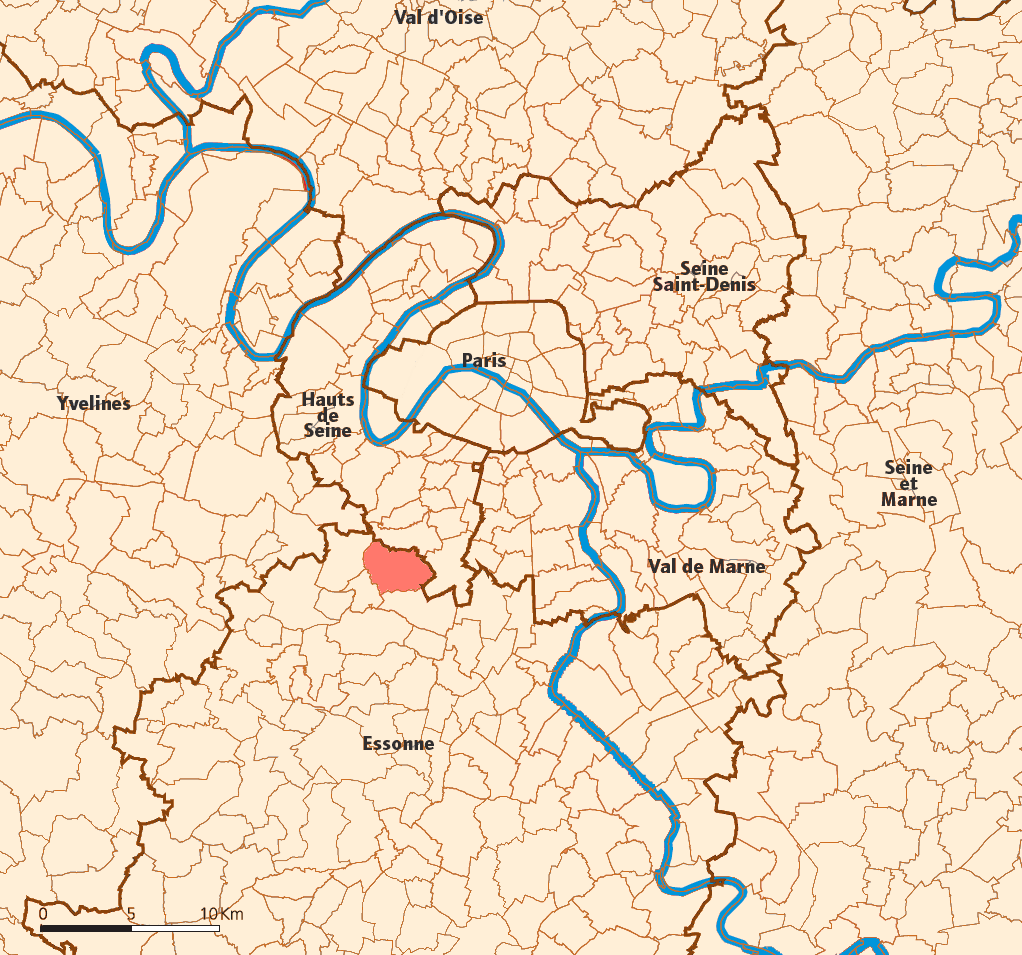
- Location (in red) within Paris inner and outer suburbs
- Location of Verrières-le-Buisson
- Location within France Location within Île-de-France (region)
- Coordinates: 48°44′47″N 2°16′03″E
- Country: France
- Region: Île-de-France
- Department: Essonne
- Arrondissement: Palaiseau
- Canton: Gif-sur-Yvette
- Intercommunality: CA Paris-Saclay

Government
  - Mayor (2020–2026): François-Guy Trébulle
- Area^{1}: 9.91 km^{2} (3.83 sq mi)
- Elevation: 64 m (210 ft)
- Highest elevation: 174 m (571 ft)
- Lowest elevation: 52 m (171 ft)
- Population (2023): 15,057
  - Density: 1,520/km^{2} (3,940/sq mi)
- Time zone: UTC+01:00 (CET)
  - Summer (DST): UTC+02:00 (CEST)
- INSEE/Postal code: 91645 /91370
- ^{1} French Land Register data, which excludes lakes, ponds, glaciers > 1 km^{2} (0.386 sq mi or 247 acres) and river estuaries.

Verrières-le-Buisson (French pronunciation: [vɛʁjɛʁ lǝ bɥisɔ̃]) is a commune in the southern suburbs of Paris, France. It is 13.3 km (8.3 mi) from the centre of Paris, in the Essonne department just outside the inner ring of the Île-de-France.

The commune borders the river Bièvre.

== History ==
The "Villa Vedrarias", was given by Childebert I in 543 to the Abbey of Saint-Germain-des-Prés. It is the first written mention of Verrières. The current name appears during the 16th century.

Under the reign of Louis XIV, who enjoyed hunting in the Verrières forest, the term "Le Buisson" was added. This is reflected in the coat of arms, which bears an oak, along with the arms of Saint-Germain. External ornaments include two beavers (bievers in Old French) symbolizing the river Bièvre.

== Population ==
Inhabitants of Verrières-le-Buisson are known as Verriérois in French.

Historical population
Year	Pop.	±% p.a.
1968	9,852	—
1975	11,400	+2.11%
1982	13,555	+2.50%
1990	15,710	+1.86%
1999	15,923	+0.15%
2007	15,805	−0.09%
2012	15,612	−0.25%
2017	15,242	−0.48%
2023	15,057	−0.20%
Source: INSEE

== Twin towns ==
- Hövelhof in Germany, since 1971
- Swanley in the UK, since 1985
- Zinado in the Ganzourgou province in Burkina Faso, since 1998 (partnership)

== Points of interest ==
- Arboretum Vilmorin
- Arboretum municipal de Verrières-le-Buisson

== Economy ==
Kroll Ontrack has an office in the commune.

== Transport ==
Verrières-le-Buisson is served by no station of the Paris Métro, RER, or suburban rail network. The closest station to Verrières-le-Buisson is Massy–Verrières station, an interchange station on Paris RER B and RER C. This station is located in the neighboring commune of Massy, 1.4 km (0.87 mi) from the town center of Verrières-le-Buisson.

Verrières is linked by the Coulée Verte cycleway to the centre of Paris, Sceaux and Massy.

== Gallery ==
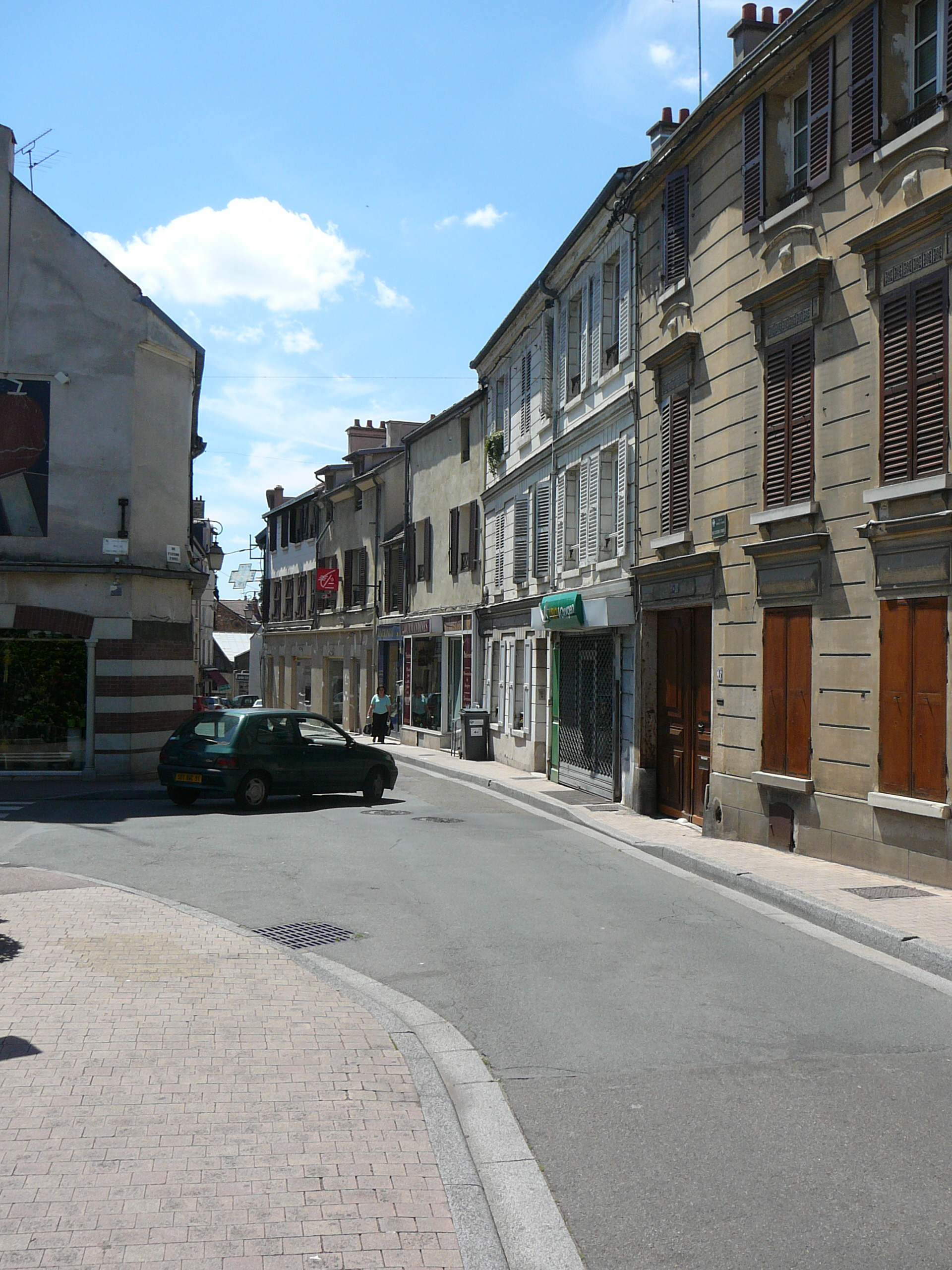
Part of Rue St Etienne d'Orves, the main street

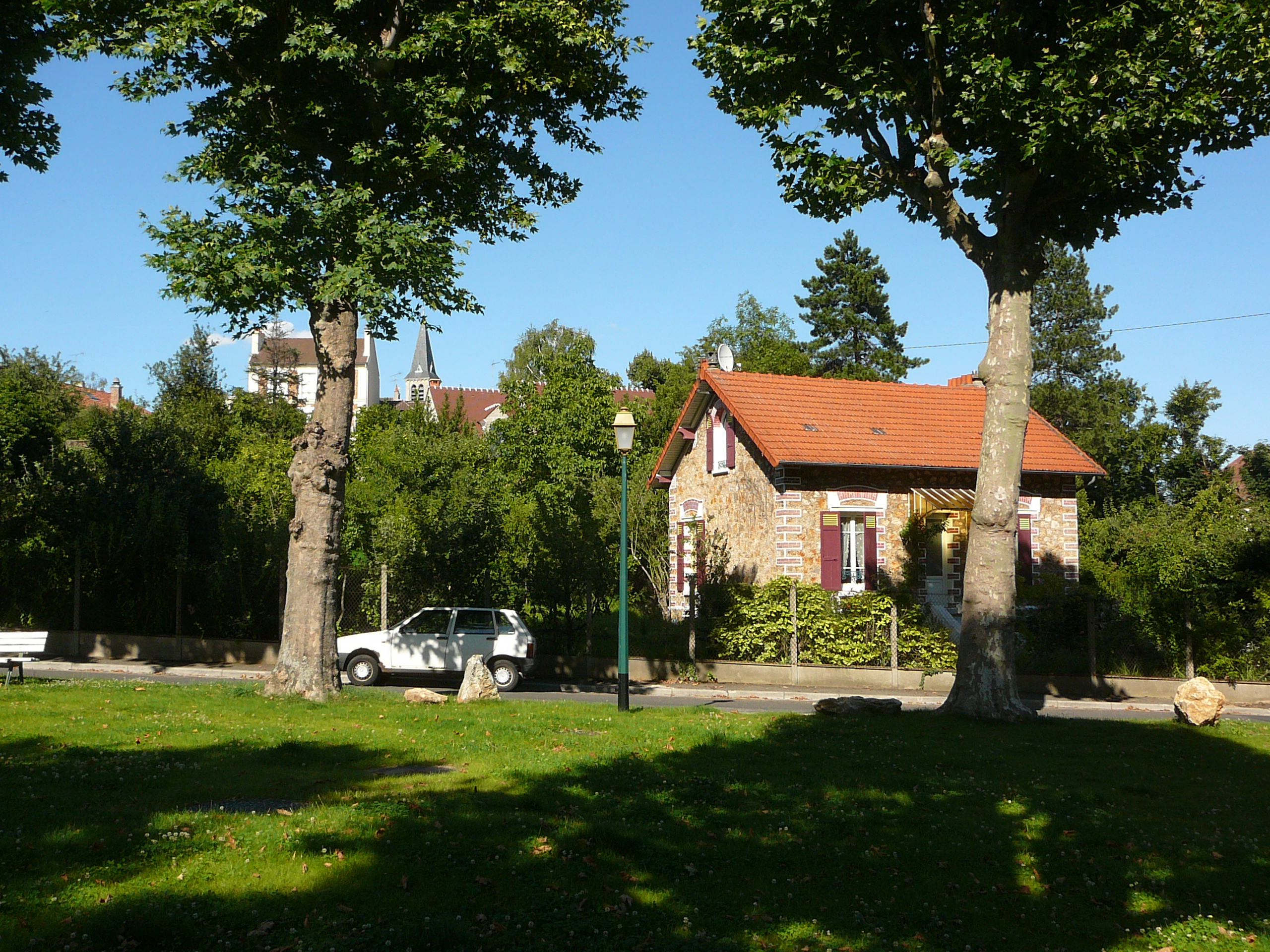
The village green

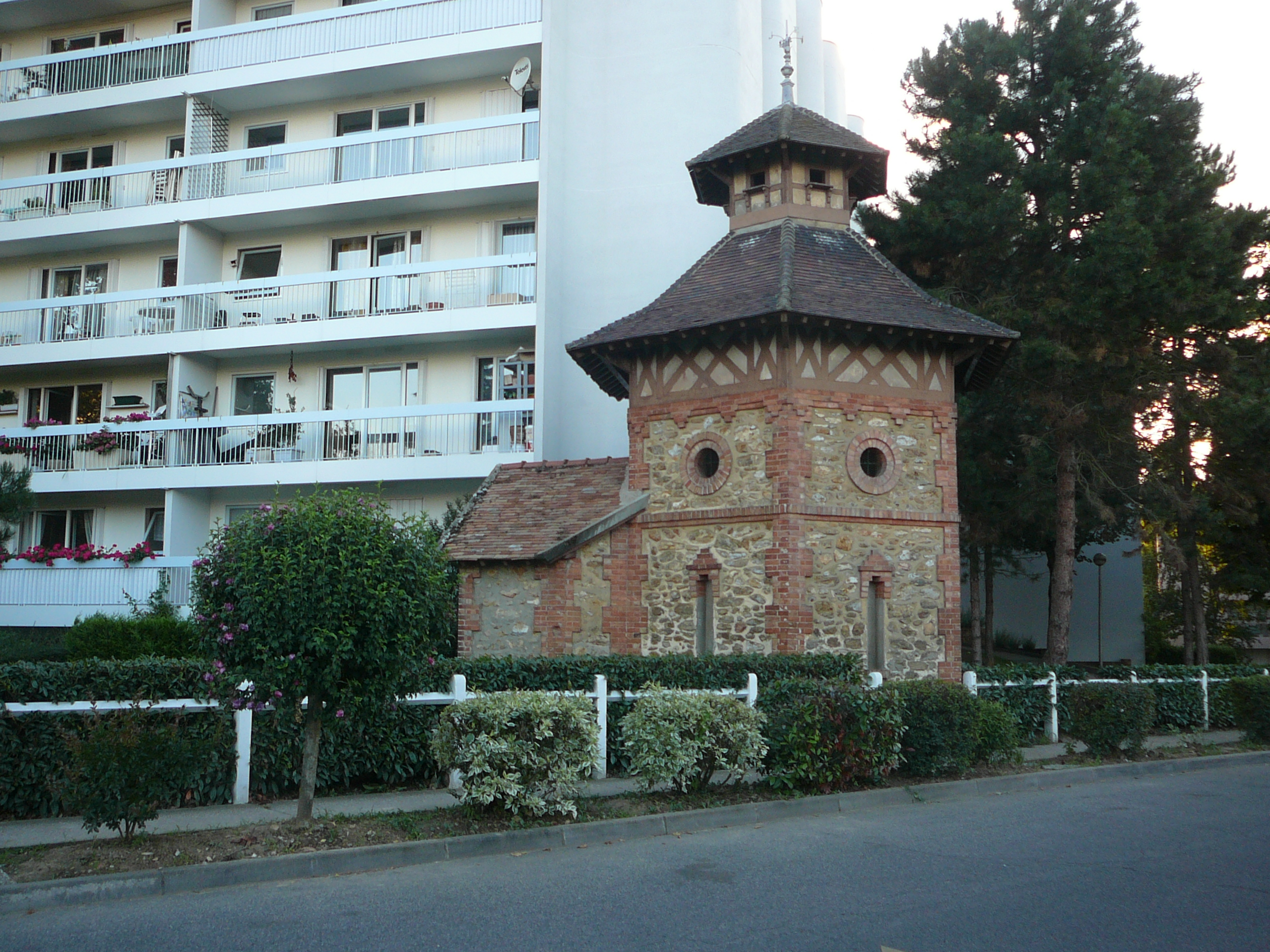
Dovecote (colombier), a remnant of the village surrounded by 20 large houses, now surrounded by apartment blocks

== See also ==
- Communes of the Essonne department
