= Louis de Vilmorin =

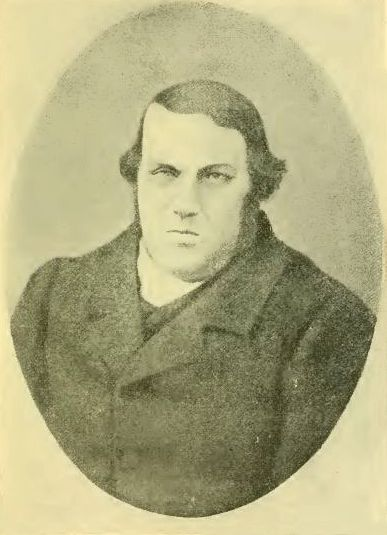
Louis de Vilmorin

Pierre Louis François Lévêque de Vilmorin (1816–March 22, 1860), usually referred to as Louis de Vilmorin, the grandson of Philippe André de Vilmorin, and a member of the family firm of Vilmorin-Andrieux, devoted his life to biology and chemistry, with a focus on the breeding and cultivation of plants.

Louis de Vilmorin developed a theory of heredity in plants and recognized that it was possible to select certain characteristics of a plant and develop new varieties displaying the chosen characteristics. In 1856, de Vilmorin published his "Note on the Creation of a New Race of Beetroot and Considerations on Heredity in Plants," establishing the theoretical groundwork for the modern seed-breeding industry.

== Writings ==
- "Note on the Creation of a New Race of Beetroot and Considerations on Heredity in Plants," - Louis de Vilmorin

== See also ==
- Philippe André de Vilmorin (1776–1862)
- Joseph-Marie-Philippe Lévêque de Vilmorin (1872–1917)
- Louise Leveque de Vilmorin (1902–1969)
