= Philippe de Vilmorin =

French botanist and plant collector

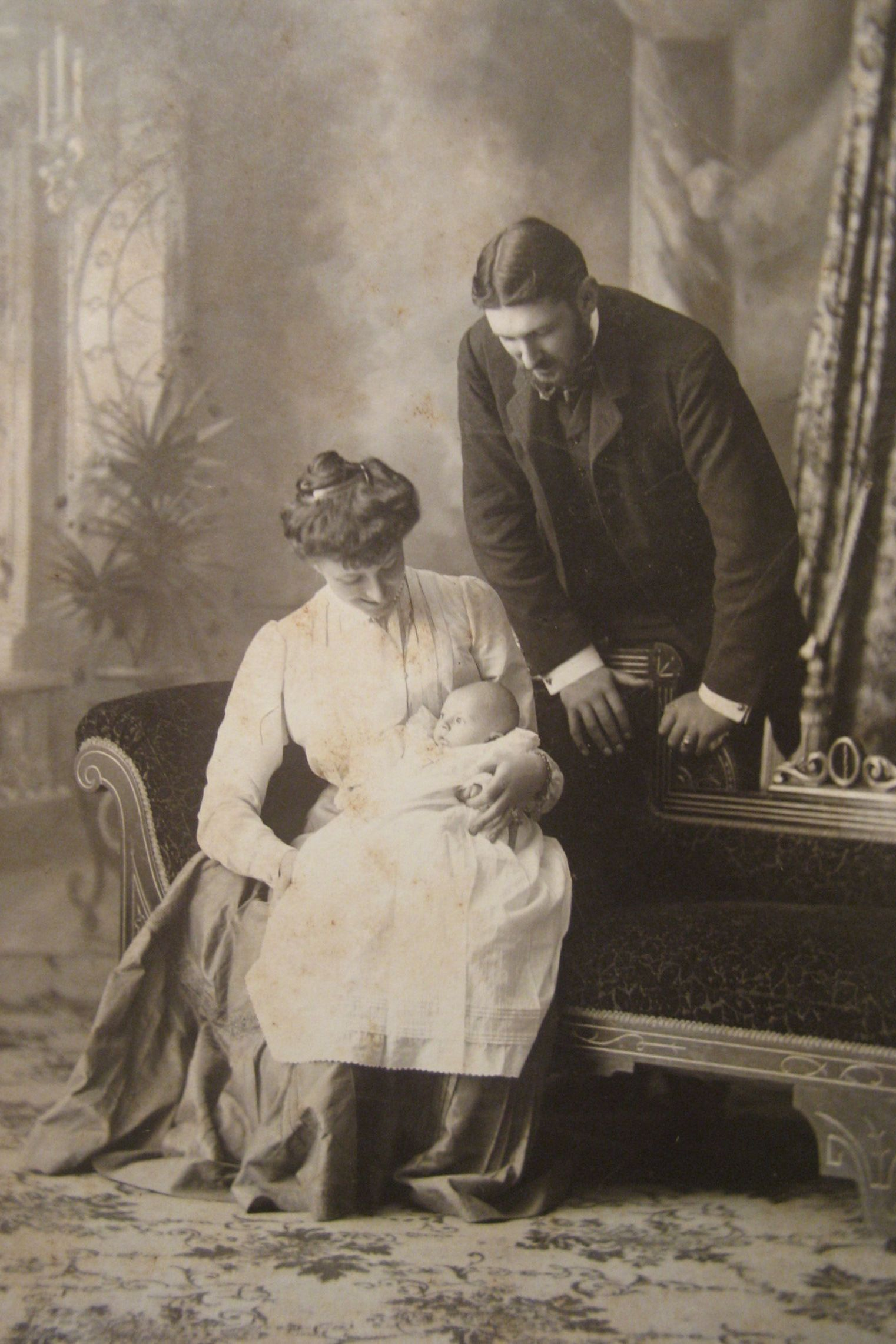
Philippe de Vilmorin and his wife

Joseph-Marie-Philippe Lévêque de Vilmorin (21 May 1872 – 29 June 1917), generally known as Philippe de Vilmorin, was a noted French botanist and plant collector, and a member of the celebrated Vilmorin family of horticulturists.

In 1903 Vilmorin began the Arboretum de Pézanin, an arboretum located in Dompierre-les-Ormes, Saône-et-Loire, Bourgogne, France. He also collected plants in Egypt and Sudan that now form part of the herbarium of the National Botanic Garden of Belgium. He took a keen interest in flower gardening, and was responsible for three important publications of the firm: Les Fleurs de Pleine Terre, Le Manuel de Floriculture and the Hortus Vilmorinianus. One of Philippe de Vilmorin's great services to genetics was the organization of the Fourth International Conference on Genetics, held in Paris on 18–23 September 1911.

During World War I, as a reserve officer in the French Army, Vilmorin was for a time attached to the Anglo-Indian Army in France as an interpreter, and later was a French Purchasing Agent in London.

== Personal life ==
Philippe Vilmorin married Mélanie Gaufridy de Dortan; they raised six children:

- Mapie de Toulouse-Lautrec (1901–1972)
- Louise de Vilmorin (1902–1969)
- Henry de Vilmorin (1903–1961)
- Olivier de Vilmorin (1904–1962)
- Roger de Vilmorin (1905–1980), fathered by Alfonso XIII of Spain but recognized by Philippe.
- André de Vilmorin (1907–1987)

== Death ==
Philippe de Vilmorin died on 29 June 1917 aged 45. He had been ill in southern France for some months, exhausted by his missions between Paris and London.

== Selected works ==
- Vilmorin, Philippe Lévêque de, Hortus Vilmorianus, catalogue des plantes ligneuses et herbacées existant en 1905 dans les collections de Vilmorin et dans les cultures de Vilmorin-Andrieux et cie à Verrieres le Buisson, Verrières, 1906.

== See also ==
- Philippe André de Vilmorin (1776–1862)
- Louis de Vilmorin (1816–1860)
- Louise de Vilmorin (1902–1969)
