= Food writing =

Literature about food

Food writing is a literary genre that focuses on the cultural and historical significance of food. It encompasses various forms, including recipes, journalism, memoirs, and travelogues, and can be found in both fiction and non-fiction works. Food writers explore food and its overlap with agriculture, ecology, culture, politics, and personal memories.

Food writing is not limited to communicating information about food but often aims to offer an aesthetic experience. M. F. K. Fisher, a famous American food writer, described her work as an exploration of hunger, love, and the satisfaction of basic human needs. Another American food writer, Adam Gopnik, divides food writing into two categories: the "mock epic," which humorously elevates the subject of food, and the "mystical microcosmic," which poetically delves into the deeper meanings of food experiences.

Food writing emerged as a recognized term in the 1990s and includes historical works that have shaped its meaning, such as Jean Anthelme Brillat-Savarin's "The Physiology of Taste." The field includes food criticism, food journalism, and food history. Food journalism, in particular, has evolved to address broader issues like climate change and public health, expanding beyond traditional food criticism.

== Definition ==
Food writers regard food as a substance and a cultural phenomenon. John T. Edge, an American food writer, explains how writers in the genre view its topic:

Food is essential to life. It's arguably our nation's biggest industry. Food, not sex, is our most frequently indulged pleasure. Food—too much, not enough, the wrong kind, the wrong frequency—is one of our society's greatest causes of disease and death.

Another American food writer, Mark Kurlansky, links this vision of food directly to food writing, giving the genre's scope and range when he observes:

Food is about agriculture, about ecology, about man's relationship with nature, about the climate, about nation-building, cultural struggles, friends and enemies, alliances, wars, religion. It is about memory and tradition and, at times, even about sex.

Because food writing is topic centered, it is not a genre in itself, but a writing that uses a wide range of traditional genres, including recipes, journalism, memoir, and travelogues. Food writing can refer to poetry and fiction, such as Marcel Proust's À la recherche du temps perdu (In Search of Lost Time), with its famous passage where the narrator recollects his childhood memories as a result of sipping tea and eating a madeleine; or Robert Burns's poem "Address to a Haggis", 1787. Charles Dickens, a notable novelist wrote memorably about food, e.g., in his A Christmas Carol (1843).

Often, food writing is used to specify writing that takes a more literary approach to food, such as that of the famous American food writer M. F. K. Fisher, who describes her writing about food as follows:

It seems to me our three basic needs, for food and security and love, are so mixed and mingled and entwined that we cannot straightly think of one without the others. So it happens that when I write of hunger, I am really writing about love and the hunger for it, and warmth and the love of it and the hunger for it ... and then the warmth and richness and fine reality of hunger satisfied ... and it is all one.

In this literary sense, food writing aspires toward more than merely communicating information about food; it also aims to provide readers with an aesthetic experience. Another American food writer, Adam Gopnik, divides food writing into two categories, "the mock epic and the mystical microcosmic," and provides examples of their most noted practitioners:

The mock epic (A. J. Liebling, Calvin Trillin, the French writer Robert Courtine, and any good restaurant critic) is essentially comic and treats the small ambitions of the greedy eater as though they were big and noble, spoofing the idea of the heroic while raising the minor subject to at least temporary greatness. The mystical microcosmic, of which Elizabeth David and M. F. K. Fisher are the masters, is essentially poetic, and turns every remembered recipe into a meditation on hunger and the transience of its fulfillment. Contemporary food writers working in this mode include Ruth Reichl, Betty MacDonald, and Jim Harrison.

As a term, "food writing" is a relatively new descriptor. It came into wide use in the 1990s and, unlike "sports writing", or "nature writing", it has yet to be included in the Oxford English Dictionary. Consequently, definitions of food writing when applied to historical works are retrospective. Classics of food writing, such as the 18th century French gastronome Jean Anthelme Brillat-Savarin's La physiologie du goût (The Physiology of Taste), pre-date the term and have helped to shape its meaning.

== Fields of practice ==
=== Food criticism ===
A food critic or restaurant critic produces written commentary on dining experiences.

=== Food journalism ===
Food journalism is a field of journalism that focuses on news and current events related to food, its production, and the cultures of producing and consuming that food. Typically, food journalism includes a scope broader than the work of food critics, who analyze restaurants and their products, and is similar to a sub-genre of "food writing", which documents the experience and history of food.

Food journalism often explores the impact of current events on food, such as how the Impact of the COVID-19 pandemic on the food industry, or larger issues, such as impacts of climate change on food production. Increasingly, these themes overlap with public health journalism, political journalism, and economic journalism. Food journalism can inform the public about how public policy influences America's food system and the importance of immigrant labor in industry. Food journalism also covers topics such as the importance of essential workers during the COVID-19 pandemic, restaurant workers' roles in society and expand on the cultural importance of truck drivers. This expands on themes traditional to food criticism, which has tended to focus on fine dining and other kinds of food writing, like cookbook writing. These themes are similar to the themes covered in agricultural journalism, which focuses on the agriculture industry for agricultural audiences.

The NYT Cooking provides relevant information about the history and cultural relevance of food recipes, allowing for the diffusion of cuisines from around the world, often different from one's own culture. Food journalism requires care and understanding through speaking to experts about the cuisines and conducting careful research about culture and diet. Cooking at-home recipes and sharing recipe advice and construction contribute to food sovereignty by enforcing less dependences on pre-packaged and commercial food.

Food journalism expands further by informing the public about news and current events related to food, by discussing the importance of food sovereignty. Food sovereignty refers to the control people have over the production and distribution of their food. It helps the public understand the food systems around them as well as influencing personal diet choices.

=== Food history ===
Food history is an interdisciplinary field that examines the history and the cultural, economic, environmental, and sociological impacts of food and human nutrition. It includes famines and malnutrition. It is distinct from the more traditional field of culinary history, which focuses on the origin and recreation of specific recipes.

== History ==
People have been writing about food for centuries. Some of the earliest recipes we have found were carved into stone in Mesopotamia nearly 4,000 years ago. The ancient Romans also wrote about their grand feasts and fancy meals held by emperors of the time. Although the modern cookbook like we see today was not invented until much later and measurements were not standardized until the 20th century.

== In academia ==
Food writer Michael Pollan holds the Knight Professorship of Science and Environmental Journalism at the University of California, Berkeley and since 2013 has directed the 11th Hour Food and Farming Journalism Fellowship Program.

In 2013, the University of South Florida St. Petersburg began a graduate certificate program in Food Writing and Photography, created by longtime Tampa Bay Times food and travel editor Janet K. Keeler.

== Notable food writers and books ==
=== Authors ===
This is a list of some prominent writers on food, cooking, dining, and cultural history related to food.

- Jay Rayner
- Karen Anand
- Robert Appelbaum
- Archestratus
- Athenaeus
- James Beard
- Maggie Beer
- Mrs Beeton
- Edward Behr
- Raymond Blanc
- Anthony Bourdain
- Jean-Anthelme Brillat-Savarin
- Jane Brody
- Alton Brown
- Robert Farrar Capon
- Julia Child
- Mei Chin
- Craig Claiborne
- Brendan Connell
- Shirley Corriher
- Fanny Cradock
- Elizabeth Craig
- Curnonsky
- Tarla Dalal
- Elizabeth David
- Alan Davidson
- Emiko Davies
- Giada De Laurentiis
- Avis DeVoto
- Andrew Dornenburg
- Escoffier
- Susie Fishbein
- M. F. K. Fisher
- Carol Lee Flinders
- Alexandros Giotis
- Adam Gopnik
- Gael Greene
- Jane Grigson
- Tim Hayward
- Marcella Hazan
- Karen Hess
- Amanda Hesser
- Kate Heyhoe
- Alison Holst
- Gil Hovav
- Judith Jones
- Jonathan Kauffman
- Diana Kennedy
- Christopher Kimball
- Mark Kurlansky
- Kylie Kwong
- Nigella Lawson
- David Leite
- Paul Levy
- A. J. Liebling
- Manju Malhi
- Ginette Mathiot
- Harold McGee
- Zora Mintalová - Zubercová
- Prosper Montagné
- Massimo Montanari
- Joan Nathan
- Marion Nestle
- Jamie Oliver
- Richard Olney
- Clementine Paddleford
- Karen A. Page
- Jean Paré
- Angelo Pellegrini
- Elizabeth Robins Pennell
- Jacques Pépin
- Michael Pollan
- Edouard de Pomiane
- Wolfgang Puck
- Gordon Ramsay
- Rachael Ray
- Ruth Reichl
- Gary Rhodes
- Claudia Roden
- Waverley Root
- Marcel Rouff
- Michael Ruhlman
- Eric Schlosser
- Nigel Slater
- Delia Smith
- Raymond Sokolov
- Jeffrey Steingarten
- Joanne Stepaniak
- Martha Stewart
- John Thorne
- Raquel Torres Cerdán
- Mapie de Toulouse-Lautrec
- Alice Waters
- Anne Willan
- Paula Wolfert
- Martin Yan
- Joe Yonan

=== Important texts in the genre (not easily attributable to an author) ===
- Larousse Gastronomique (1938; 1961; 1988; 2001: four editions, the first of which describes French cuisine; the last of the three English editions also includes coverage of cuisines other than French; the original editor was Prosper Montagné)
- The Forme of Cury (compiled by the chief master cooks of King Richard II of England)
- Le Viandier (a French cookery book of the 14th century)

== See also ==
- List of chefs
- Cookbook
- Gastronomy
- Gourmet ideal
- Gourmet Museum and Library
- Guild of Food Writers of the United Kingdom
