= Carmen Ramírez Degollado =

Mexican restauranteur

Carmen Ramírez Degollado (born 1940, Xalapa) is an internationally recognized expert on traditional Mexican food, head of the El Bajío restaurants located in Mexico City. She grew up in the rural area of Xalapa, Veracruz with no intentions of becoming a restaurateur. However, when her husband died in 1981, she took over the restaurant he founded and expanded it adding dishes from her native Veracruz and other Mexican states along with the carnitas and barbacoa that he made. Carmen’s international recognition began when she accompanied her daughter who went abroad to study to become a professional chef. This led to classes, consulting and participation in gastronomic events principally in the United States and Europe.

== Life ==
Carmen Ramírez Degollado was born in 1940 in Xalapa, Veracruz, a colonial city in the mountains of the state, surrounded by nature and coffee fields. From the colonial period to the 19th century, it was a prosperous city and developed its own variant on Mexican cuisine. She was born Carmen Hernández Oropeza, but she is professionally known with her late husband’s last names, as well as the nickname “Titita.”

Carmen was raised traditionally to be a housewife and mother, which included cooking She says that the women of her family, especially her mother and her aunt which raised her, were very industrious both in cooking and sewing. Being traditional, the cooking generally involved traditional cookware such as comals and clay pots. Women were also prominent in the family, as they generally outnumbered the men. She says she was restless as a child. Many of her childhood and adolescent memories involved food, especially the cooking of her mother and other female members of the family as well as the fruits and vegetables that grow in her native state. She remembers going to the local market as a child and being fascinated by it, with its fresh fruits and vegetables and women in indigenous dress.

Her mother, Vicenta del Carmen, was raised in the very high mountains of Las Vigas, Veracruz. She gained the name of “Titita” because she did not like the name Vicenta and the nickname is a play off of it. Her mother married Guillermo Hernández from Papantla after they met in Xalapa, and the couple divided their time between Xalapa and Papantla. This influenced her mother’s cooking, which included dishes from her hometown, Xalapa and Papantla.

Her father died when she was only five years old. She and her sister Luchi were then raised by her mother, an aunt she called Mama Luz and a nanny by the name of Amparo. Carmen gained the nickname Titita as well, being called “Titita chica” (Titita junior) as she grew up. As a teen, she was selected to compete in the Miss Red Cross pageant, representing Xalapa in Mexico City. Later, she met her husband Raúl Ramírez Degollado at a party in her honor in Xalapa. They dated for two years before they married in 1957. During the courtship, Carmen remembers meals that they ate at her house prepared by her family.

Despite being from a traditional family and surrounded by food, Carmen did not begin to cook until she got married. At that time her nanny Amparo taught her the recipes she and her mother made. After marriage, she first moved with her husband to the city of Veracruz, with her nanny Amparo accompanying them. They then moved to Mexico City because of Raúl’s career. Carmen remembers that one of her husband’s many friends was French who wanted nothing more than to be invited to the house to eat her noodle soup. She said this was her first indication that Mexican cooking offered something to the world. When Raúl retired, he bought a restaurant in Azcapotzalco, and when he died, Carmen took over the business.

With her husband, Carmen had five children. Her oldest child, Raúl is a mathematician and her other son, José Guillermo, is a commercial pilot. Her three daughters have worked with the restaurant at some point in their lives. Maricarmen is an administrator of the restaurant chain. Luz María is also in business administration, managing the Azcapotzalco location. María Teresa studied to become a professional chef in England, Canada and San Francisco. She worked for a time as a pastry chef in Spain at the Drolma restaurant in Barcelona, but today owns several pastry shops in Mexico City.

== El Bajío restaurant ==
In 1972, Carmen’s husband Raúl retired from the pharmaceutical business and decided to start a restaurant with a friend named Alfonso Hurtado Morellón to make barbacoa and the Michoacán style carnitas he knew growing up in Cotija The partners found the Azcapotzalco location for sale, but Carmen was against it because it was far from their San Ángel home and it was in an industrial part of the city. However, the location was bought with an initial investment of 200,000 pesos. When the restaurant opened, she went to the main market in La Merced every eight days to buy fresh produce, never canned or frozen, a tradition that continues at the restaurant today.

Some years later, Raúl was diagnosed with cancer and three years later in 1981, he died, leaving Carmen a widow at age 40 With the support of her family and friends, she took over her husband’s restaurant. She changed the menu adding items that she had cooked for family and friends for many years as well as dishes that were specialties of her nanny Amparo, who was helping her raise her children. She also hired waiters and trained them in customer service. These included dishes such as mole de olla, gorditas with beans and avocado leaves, seafood dishes and Veracruz style coffee. Over the decades, dishes from other regions in Mexico such as Michoacán, Puebla and Oaxaca were also added. In those early days, she got up each morning at 6 am to buy supplies for the restaurant at La Merced. However, she always closed the restaurant at 6pm, so she could take care of her children. She started with fifteen employees, learning the restaurant business on her own, a business long dominated by men in Mexico.

She never planned on having a career in the restaurant business, but the changes made the restaurant a success, allowing her to send her children to some of the best private universities in Mexico. In addition to the food, another trademark was the decoration of the restaurant. She is an enthusiast of Mexican art and handcrafts, both of which she used to decorate the Azcapotzalco restaurant, and later in other locations. Motivated by the desire to preserver traditions related to Day of the Dead, she organized a dinner for the press in 1990, inviting journalists and artists, decorating the restaurant for the occasion. This began the tradition of decorating the restaurants for various important Mexican holidays. She also decorates the restaurants for other various major Mexican holidays such as Christmas, Independence Day and the day of the Virgin of Guadalupe . She has also celebrated Día del Maíz (Corn Day) with an altar as she says the plant is divine.

The original restaurant is still in an industrial zone in Azcapotzalco. The menu of the restaurant concentrates on dishes from Veracruz, Puebla, Michoacán and Oaxaca, but it strongly reflects Carmen’s Veracruz heritage. Veracruz specialties include gorditas with beans flavored with avocado leaves, puffed gorditas, Papantla style tamales and atole with fresh fruit. One condiment that is unique to the restaurant is salsa negra de chipotle meco (black sauce of meco chipotle pepper) a specialty of her late nanny. Her food has been described as rustic and devoted to tradition. She continues to make carnitas in honor of her late husband. El Bajío remains a traditional location to eat carnitas and barbacoa on weekends.

The restaurant attracts both common and distinguished diners as well as tourists from other parts of Mexico and abroad. The restaurant has been visited by some of the best chefs in the world, recommended by food experts such as Diana Kennedy, chef Guillermo González de Pangela and Ferrán Adrià of El Bulli in Spain says it is the best Mexican restaurant he has ever eaten at. The New York Times called her one of the matriarchs of Mexican cooking, running one of the two best Mexican restaurants in Mexico City.

Most of her advertising is word-of mouth. She has befriended much of Mexico’s artist and artisan communities and her restaurants include the works of Rodolfo Morales, Juan Alcázar, Justina Fuentes, Marisa Luisa Guerrero, Carmen Parra, Felipe Ehrenberg, Ofelia Murrieta and many more. Most of her career has been focused on the restaurant in Azcapotzalco with employees who have worked for her since the restaurant opened such as Pablo Solorio and Felix, as well as Sandra Olvera, who started working at the restaurant when she was eleven years old. A number of others have over ten years as employees. At the urging of her children, in 2006, the Bajío name branched out into other areas of Mexico City. Today there are ten locations. The main restaurant has a deep blue and orange scheme, decorated with Mexican art and handcrafts. The other restaurants have similar but distinct decorative schemes.

In 2012, Carmen celebrated the 40th anniversary of the opening of the original El Bajío with family and many recognizable friends including Diana Kennedy and chefs such as Guillermo González Beristáin, Zahie Téllez, Federico López, Mark Miller and John Bagur. For the occasion, a small cookbook with forty of her soup recipes was created, printed on amate paper.

== Other gastronomic activities ==
She is considered one of the most important experts on Mexican cuisine, along with Patricia Quintana, Monica Patiño and Alicia Gironella. However, she was never trained as a chef and proudly calls herself a “cocinera” (cook) . One of her preoccupations is the preservation of traditional Mexican cooking. She says that the cuisine is much more than a list of typical dishes from the country. It reflects the evolution of Mexico’s culture and history and has tied Mexican cuisine to the rest of Mexican society and culture both in Mexico and abroad. It is said that there are two kinds of cooks in Mexico, those who take the time to fry noodles before making soup and those who do not. Carmen is described as one who does take that time. She defends traditional cooking and eschews modern conveniences such as microwaves. According to her, it is not a question of romanticizing the past but rather reaffirming Mexican identity. However, Carmen recognizes that much of traditional Mexican cooking, labor-intensive and with long cooking times, is almost a thing of the past as women work jobs along with men. She says she has great respect for the women of areas such as Oaxaca, Veracruz and Michoacán who still cook with firewood and charcoal. Carmen is concerned about the loss of varieties of corn, such as blue and red and the introduction of genetically engineered ones.

Her work with the restaurant has led to other cultural and gastronomic activities, for example using the restaurant to host charity events. In 1996, El Bajío hosted an exhibition dedicated to the traditional implements used in Mexican cooking, which was inspired by painting of wooden ladles done by Emilio Sánchez for the restaurant called “Cucharadas de color” (Large colored spoons). In 1997 another exhibition was dedicated to metates (Mesoamerican grinding stones) and petates (palm frond mats). This event was inaugurated with tamales from various regions of Mexico. In 1999, another event was dedicated to the comal and the olla (traditional cooking pot) .

Carmen has traveled throughout Mexico and abroad to teach and present traditional Mexican cooking. She began to travel outside of Mexico in 1989 when her daughter began to attend culinary school, which led her to begin participating in various international gastronomic events and activities including the Andalucía Sabor in Seville in 2009 and the San Sebastián Gastronomika in Spain in 2011. She has given culinary demonstrations and prepared special events in places such as the James Beard Foundation in New York, the Ritz Hotel in Lisbon, the Mana Lani Bay Hotel in Honolulu, The Culinary Institute of America in Napa Valley, the Rio Hotel in Las Vegas, the Marriott Hotel in Kuala Lumpur, the Les Dames d’Escoffier International in Atlanta and the Hyatt Hotel in Seattle. She taught classes for three years on Mexican cooking at the Culinary Institute of America in Napa Valley and has worked as a consultant for various restaurants in the United States and Europe. She also appeared on the public service announcement series “Got Milk?” with her episode targeting the Los Angeles area.

In 2001, Carmen published Alquimias y atmósferas del sabor, a book dedicated to anecdotes from her life, paying tribute to the various women of her family, including her nanny Amparo, as well as recipes from Veracruz. The book was named the Best Chef Book in Spanish award as an honorary mention in the Best Chef Book in the World category at the Gourmand World Cookbook Awards as well in Paris in 2002.

Her recognitions include a Five Star Diamond Award from the American Academy of Hospitality Sciences for the El Bajío restaurant in 1998, regular invitations to participate in the Festival Annual del Centro Histórico de la Ciudad de Mexico (Annual Festival of the Historic Center of Mexico City), La Llave Empresarial award from AMAIT and ABASTUR in 2006 and 2008 and the CANIRAC entrepreneur prize in 2009. It also includes membership in the Asociación Mexicana de Restaurantes and the International Association of Chefs in the United States.

== See also ==
- Caesar Cardini
- Zarela Martinez
