= Cuisine of Veracruz =

Culinary traditions of Veracruz, México

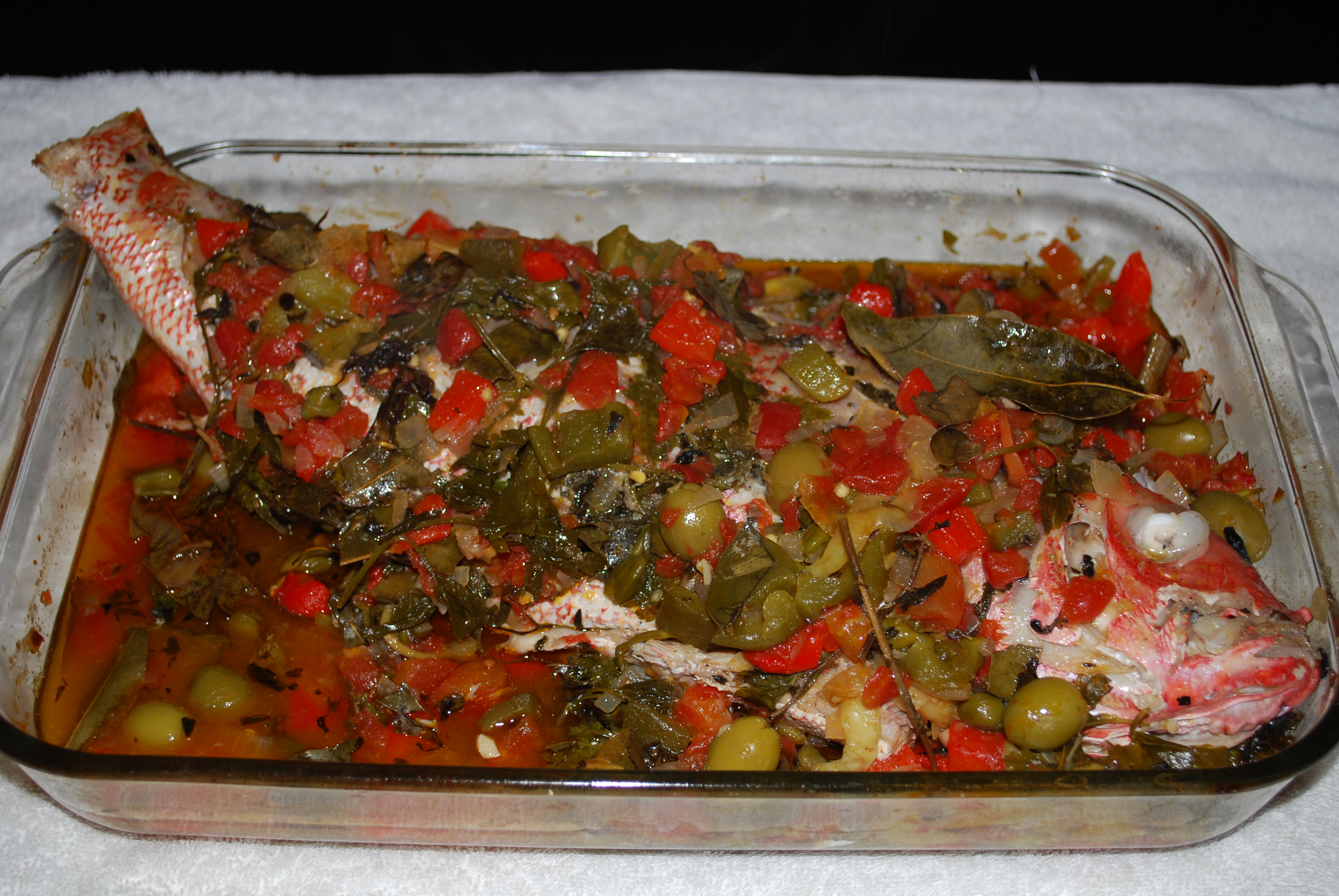
Huachinango a la Veracruzana (Snapper Veracruz style)

The cuisine of Veracruz is the regional cooking of Veracruz, a Mexican state along the Gulf of Mexico. Its cooking is characterized by three main influences—indigenous, Spanish, and Afro-Cuban—per its history, which included the arrival of the Spanish and of enslaved people from Africa and the Caribbean. These influences have contributed many ingredients to the cooking including native vanilla, corn and seafood, along with rice, spices and tubers. How much the three mix depending on the area of the state, with some areas more heavily favoring one or another. The state has worked to promote its cuisine both in Mexico and abroad as part of its tourism industry.

== Influences ==
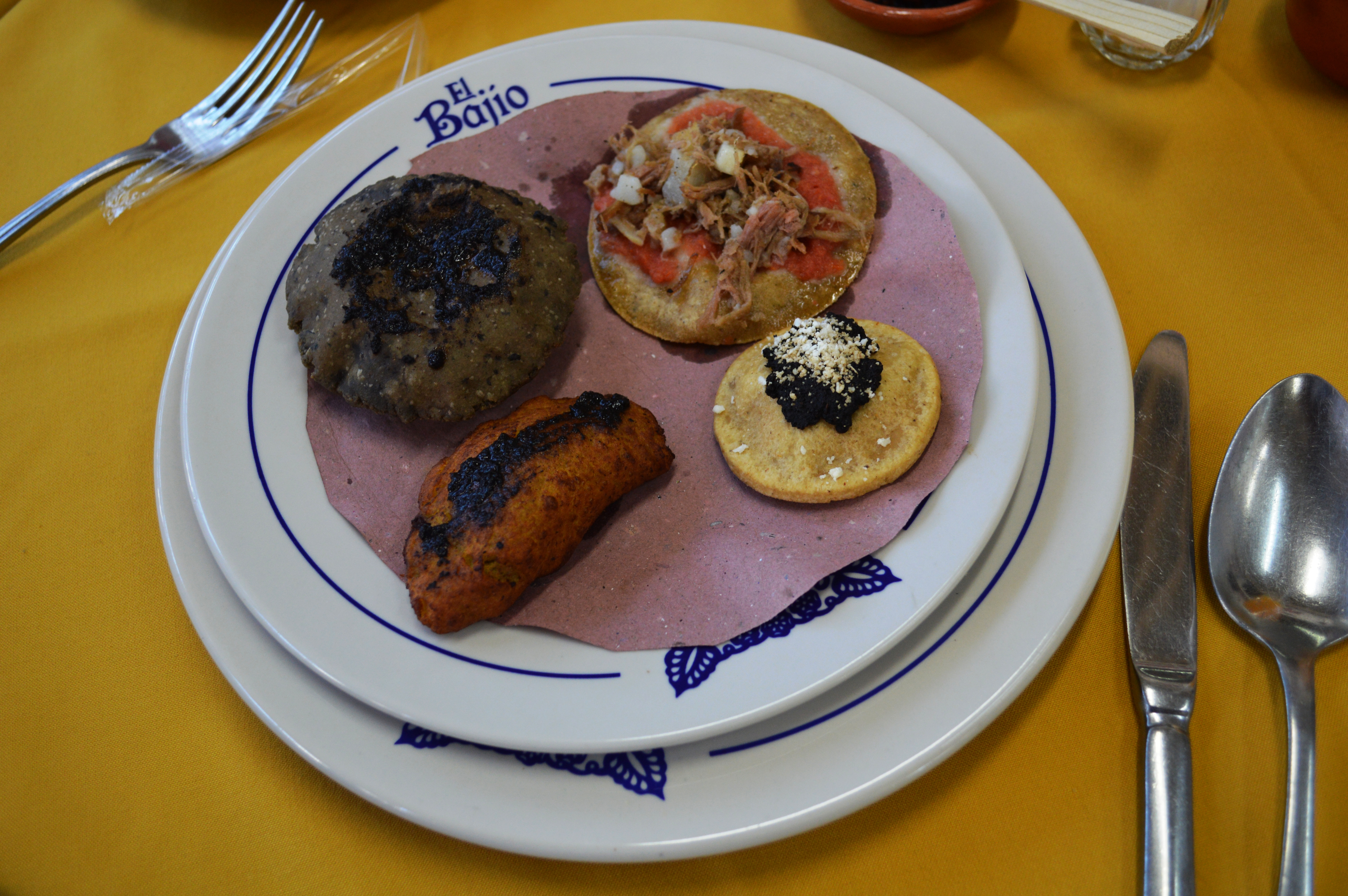
Various "antojitos" northern Veracruz style prepared at the El Bajío restaurant in Mexico City

Veracruz cooking has three main influences: indigenous, Spanish and Afro-Cuban. The most important native influence is the state's long coastline, meaning most areas have a wide array of seafood. The indigenous cooking of the state, historically characterized by that of the Olmecs, the Huastecas and the Totonacs, has included ingredients such as vanilla, native to the Papantla area, and acuyo, also known as hoja santa . Like other areas of Mexico, the staple foods were corn, beans and squash, supplemented by a variety of tropical fruits, along with chili peppers, tomatoes and avocados. Popular tropical fruits today are papaya, mamey sapote and sapote, often found in milkshakes called licuados and ice cream. The Spanish introduced parsley, thyme, marjoram, bay laurel, cilantro, saffron, cloves, cinnamon, black pepper, rice, almonds, olives, olive oil, garlic and capers, as well as pineapples and sugar cane from the Caribbean. Spanish Mediterranean influence is best seen in the use of olives, olive oil and capers. The Afro-Cuban influence is due to the importation of slaves into Mexico from Africa and the Caribbean during the colonial period.

How much each of these influences affects local cooking varies. Zongolica is considered to have the purest indigenous cuisine. Tlacotalpan is considered to have the cuisine which is most Spanish in style. One division of Veracruz is the cooking of the coast versus that of the mountains. The cooking of the coast shows the most foreign influence and the most fish, with dishes such as arroz a la tumbada, similar to paella. The cooking of the mountains contains a wide variety of mushrooms, greens, various flowers and corn dishes. Typical dishes of the mountain city of Xalapa include stuffed jalapeño chili peppers, stuffed chipotle peppers, a stew made with the izote flower (from the yucca plant) as well as an adobo, red rice, pambazos, caldo blanco, tortas de gasparitos, chileatole, cooked poblano chili pepper strips and turnovers filled with squash flowers. The state is also divided into seven regions, based on natural geography, ethnic composition and interactions with other parts of Mexico. The Totonacs of the north of the state have had their food influenced by the French who immigrated to the area in the 19th century. Cooking in the south of the state shows influence from the Isthmus of Tehuantepec as the Zapotecs migrated as far as here and traded goods with the Nahua peoples of the Gulf coast.

== Important dishes ==
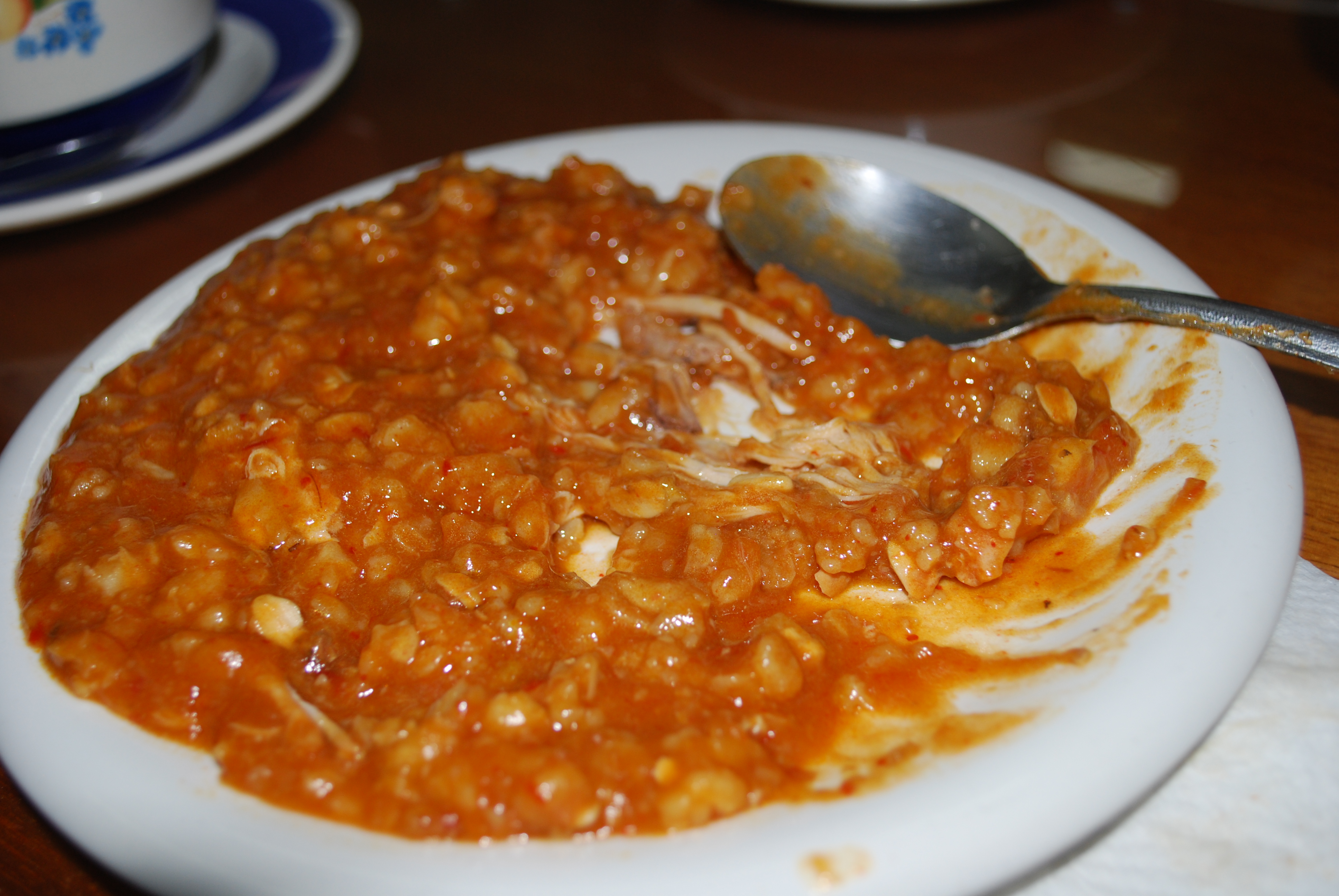
Sacahuil served at a restaurant in Papantla

The most famous Veracruz dish is huachinango a la Veracruzana (snapper Veracruz style). It is a baked whole fish covered in a tomato-based sauce flavored with mostly European ingredients such as olives, garlic, and capers. The most widely served dish in the state is arroz a la tumbada, which can be found in almost all restaurants that serve seafood in Veracruz. It originated as a poor fishermen's dish, a way to stretch seafood. It typically contains various fish and shellfish, tomatoes, onions, garlic, green chili peppers, oil and various herbs, similar to paella. It is closely followed by caldo de mariscos, a seafood soup which is said to cure hangovers.

Mole Xiqueño is a mole sauce named after its city of origin, Xico. Its two main ingredients are the mulate and ancho chili peppers. Recipes vary but other ingredients include bananas, peanuts, tortillas, almonds, cashews, breadcrumbs, onions, raisins, garlic, chocolate, sesame seed and spices like cinnamon, black pepper, cloves, oregano and anise. Like other moles, it is generally consumed for special events and holidays, although the paste to make this sauce is now commercialized by a number of small businesses.

The mountain areas have more corn-based dishes. Xalapa is known for its street foods of this type, such as picaditas and a related dish called garnadchas. Both are thick, bean-stuffed corn cakes. One notable dish of the mountain areas is zacahuil, which is generally described as a giant tamale often several feet long, able to feed between fifty and 150 people. Like tamales in Mexico, it consists of corn, flavorings and meat, which are wrapped then cooked. For sacahuil, the wrapping is either leaves from a plant called papatla or those from the banana tree, laid out. Roughly ground corn meal mixed with lard and chili peppers, seasonings and salt is spooned over the leaf wrapping. Pieces of meat, usually pork, are laid on top of this. The leaves are folded over the filling and tied in place then the zacahuil is placed in an oven to cook for ten to twelve hours. However, unlike most tamales, the consistency of the filling after cooking is not solid, but rather stew like. The dish is generally served for weddings, religious festivals and other special events. Prepared portions are often sold in traditional markets, restaurants and by street vendors.

Other important dishes of the state include chileatole de pollo, crema de palmitos, eggs with shrimp, and Otatitlán-style beans. With Oaxacan cuisine it shares huevos con frijoles, scrambled eggs with beans.

== Veracruz coffee ==
The state of Veracruz is the second largest producer of coffee in Mexico after Chiapas, with about 153,000 hectares under cultivation. Most producers are small, with 90,000 in the state, with about 300,000 directly involved in its production. It is grown in 94 municipalities, especially in the mountain areas of Xalapa, Coatepec and Orizaba, where it is sold not only for drinking but also used to flavor candies and baked goods. However, the best known place in the state to drink coffee is La Gran Parroquia, located in the city of Veracruz. It is best known for its strong, espresso-like coffee which is mixed with hot milk, called café con leche.

== Promotion of the cuisine ==
As part of its tourism industry, the state has actively promoted its cuisine both in Mexico and internationally. The capital and the nearby city of Boca del Rio is the center of the state's gastronomic scene. The Hotel Fiesta Americana and the Villa Rica Restaurant in the city of Veracruz host the annual Festival de la Cocina Veracruzana (Veracruz Cuisine Festival). The festival focuses on the state's seafood specialties, there are also dishes made with beef and chicken. The capital also holds an annual gastronomic festival dedicated to vanilla.

Restaurant owners in Alvarado, Veracruz earned a Guinness World Records title for the largest preparation of arroz a la tumbada in the world in 1995. It weighed five tons after cooking and fed 10,500 people. José Burela Picazzo is a Veracruz native and professional chef who has promoted the cuisine worldwide. Chef Zarela Martinez has written about Veracruz cuisine (Zarela's Veracruz) along with that of Oaxaca. Anthropologist, writer and restaurateur Raquel Torres Cerdán has held an important role in the preservation and recording of the indigenous cuisines of the region.
