= Makini Howell =

American vegan chef and restaurateur

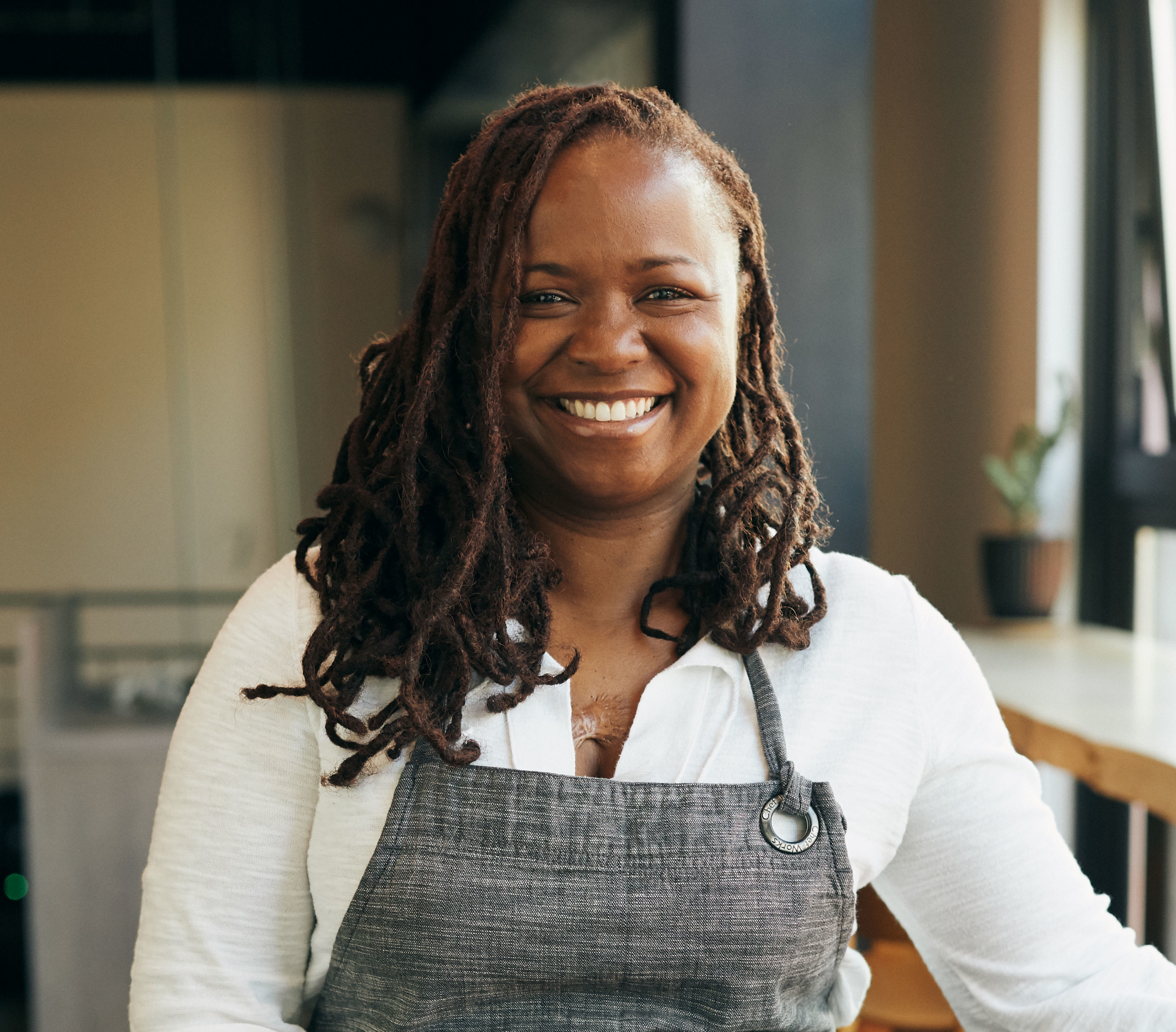
- Culinary career
- Cooking style: Vegan fine dining
- Current restaurants: Plum Bistro; Plum Burgers; Plum Pantry; Sugar Plum
- Website: plumbistro.com

Makini Howell is a vegan chef and restaurateur in Seattle, Washington. Her flagship restaurant, Plum Bistro, was a vegan fine-dining restaurant in Seattle's Capitol Hill neighborhood.

== History ==
Howell was raised vegan. Her parents have since the 1990s owned vegan sandwich shops and sold vegan sandwiches through co-ops in the region, and Howell grew up working in her family's sandwich shops.

Howell worked in New York City as a graphic designer and a clothing designer, including for Jay-Z's Rocawear, then moved back to the Northwest to pursue a renewed interest in the culinary world.

She opened Plum Bistro in 2009. In 2013 Howell published Plum. In 2014 she appeared on the Queen Latifah Show. In 2015 Stevie Wonder hired her as personal chef during his yearlong, 44-city Songs In The Key Of Life tour. In addition to Plum Bistro, Howell also operates a catering company, food truck Plum Burgers, casual eatery Plum Pantry in Seattle Center’s Armory, and dessert shop Sugar Plum. According to vegan lifestyle magazine Laika, Plum Burgers, which launched in 2013, was the first vegan burger food truck in the United States.

Howell supported Seattle's 2012 required paid sick leave law and 2015 $15 minimum wage hike. She spoke at the 2014 White House Summit on Working Families about her support of the minimum wage increase.

== Reception ==
In 2019 Julia Moskin and John Eligon, writing in the New York Times, named her to their list of "16 Black Chefs Changing Food in America". In 2017 Tasting Table named Plum Bistro one of the eight best vegan restaurants in the U.S and called them "the OG of Pacific Northwestern vegan dining." James Beard award-winning food writer Karen Page featured Howell in her Kitchen Creativity (2017).

Page and fellow Beard winner Andrew Dornenburg featured Howell in their Vegetarian Flavor Bible (2014).

== Selected publications ==
- Plum: Gratifying Vegan Dishes from Seattle's Plum Bistro (2013)

== See also ==
- List of vegetarian and vegan restaurants
- List of vegans
