= World of ¡Vamos! =

Children's picture book series

The World of ¡Vamos! is a children's picture book series. Illustrated and created by Raúl the Third alongside illustrator and colorist Elaine Bay, the series contains five picture books published by Versify. The first book ¡Vamos! Let’s Cross the Bridge was published in April 2019. Since then, the series has expanded and attracted national attention, being posted on the Best Books of 2019 for the Trade Journal, and winning the Pura Belpre Award various times. The Series depicts everyday life by the United States-Mexican border. The books feature recurring characters including Little Lobo and his dog Bernabé, as they navigate activities such as visiting markets, sharing meals, and participating in community events. Known for their dense visual style and bilingual text in English and Spanish, the series emphasizes cultural representation, language learning, and exploration of daily life in border regions. Raúl also signed a contract with Silvergate media to create an animated television series in 2021.

== Content ==
=== General plot ===
The World of ¡Vamos! series follows Little Lobo and his dog Bernabé during everyday adventures in their border community. The stories are typically centered on simple errands, such as delivering food or preparing for celebrations, but highlight and educate readers about life near the Mexican-American border and encourage readers to engage with both English and Spanish vocabulary. The series incorporates Spanish phrases alongside English translations, features illustrations reflecting everyday aspects of Latino culture, and highlights a range of cultural references.

=== Books in The World of ¡Vamos! Series ===
- ¡Vamos! Let’s Go to the Market (2019)
- ¡Vamos! Let’s Go Eat (2020)
- ¡Vamos! Let’s Cross the Bridge (2021)
- ¡Vamos! Let’s Go Read (2023)

== Raúl the Third ==
Raúl the Third, also known as Raul Gonzalez, is the author and co-illustrator for The World of ¡Vamos! Series. He grew up in El Paso, Texas and Ciudad Juarez, Mexico. In a 2019 interview with Publishers Weekly, he described his early success from his book Lowriders in Space created in 2014, which features three friends who transform a junker car into a lowrider to win a contest. His artistic style combines influences from comic books, fine art, and Mexican traditions. ¡Vamos! Let’s Go to the Market was his first authorial project. He lives in Medford, Massachusetts with his wife, co-collaborator and fellow New York Times bestselling artist, Elaine Bay.

== Elaine Bay ==
Elaine Iris Bay is the co-illustrator and colorist for the ¡Vamos! series. She focuses her visual storytelling and design by creating “character-driven” narratives for young readers. According to her publisher, HarperCollins, Bay's work reflects imaginative play, emotional development, and everyday childhood experiences. Along with her husband Raúl the Third, Elaine grew up in El Paso, Texas, and is a printmaker, graphic designer, video artist, and performance artist.

== Background ==
Raúl ¡Vamos! originated from a proposal to develop a picture book for the Versify imprint of Houghton Mifflin Harcourt. According to Raúl, the concept was inspired by the style of Richard Scarry, an American children's author and illustrator, while also incorporating cultural influences from his upbringing in El Paso and Ciudad Juarez. The series is intended to highlight aspects of life, culture, community, and bilingualism. More specifically, the first book ¡Vamos! Let’s Go to the Market was influenced by the Mercado Cuauhtémoc in Ciudad Juárez, a popular traditional market that originated in 1905. Raúl has described himself as both a cartoonist and an artist, and the picture book reflects influences from Mexican muralism and comic book aesthetics. Raúl has stated that his two brothers influenced the bilingual elements of his books. He has cited his childhood experience of “speaking English and Spanish simultaneously” with his two brothers as an important source of inspiration.

== Cultural influence ==
Raúl has stated that the World of ¡Vamos! was created both to educate and to provide comfort for children with similar upbringings. In an interview in 2021, Raúl said he wanted kids to know “that their experiences and origins are unique and important and that they should share them with the world and not shy away." Raúl has emphasized the importance of representing Mexican-American communities. During a speech at the Rabbit Hole in 2026, Raúl shared the importance of his bilingual inclusion, emphasizing having English and Spanish translations are a movement to expand cultural representation for Latino communities. He noted that many Latino-American experiences remain underrepresented in picture books. His public programming, including workshops, school visits, and collaborative printmaking projects, teaches audiences about artistic skill and promotes reading and illustration as forms of cultural expression.

== Recognition ==
The World of ¡Vamos! series is a New York Times bestseller and a four-time Pura Belpre award winner. In 2022, Vamos Let’s Cross the Bridge was awarded the Pura Belpre Youth Illustrator Award. Since 2021, Raúl has been working alongside Silvergate Media and Mercury Filmworks to transform the series into a television show. Silvergate's Kurt Meller is working alongside Raúl to create the series, whom previously has produced series including Octonauts and Chico Bon Bon.
