= El Bajío (restaurant) =

Coordinates: 19°27′45.86″N 99°10′40.24″W

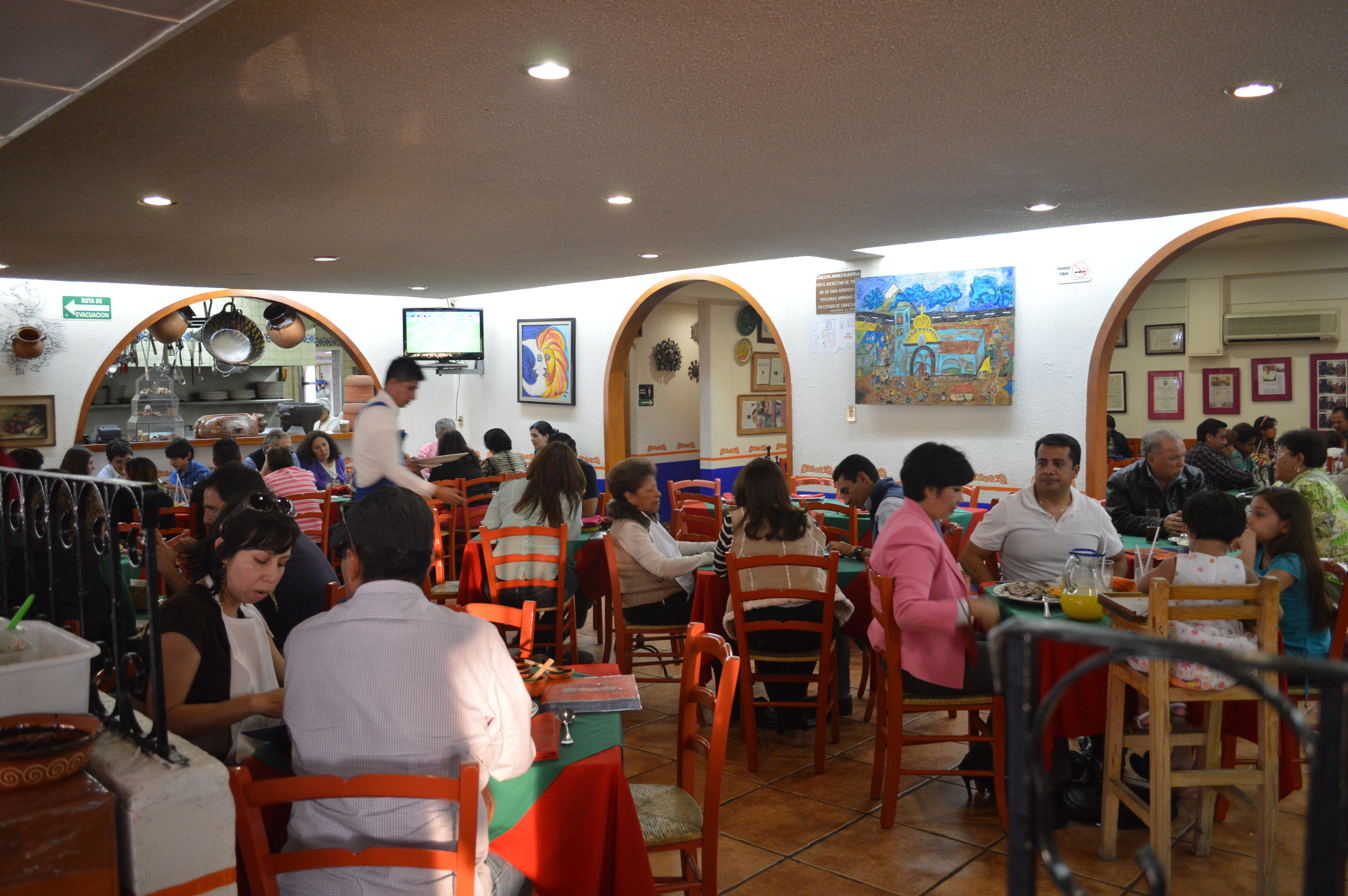
- Main dining room at Azcapotzalco
- Interactive map of El Bajío

Restaurant information
- Established: 1972; 54 years ago
- Owner: Carmen Ramírez Degollado
- Food type: Traditional Mexican
- Location: Mexico City, Mexico
- Other information: Eighteen locations in Mexico City
- Website: restauranteelbajio.com.mx

El Bajío is a group of eighteen restaurants in Mexico City which are run by Carmen Ramírez Degollado, noted for their colorful decoration and traditional cuisine from central Mexico which has received awards and praise from notable food experts. The restaurant business began in 1972 when Carmen's husband Raúl Ramírez Degollado bought a restaurant selling carnitas in the northwestern borough of Azcapotzalco. Four years later, Raúl died and Carmen took over the business, expanding the menu and adding waiters. The restaurant was so successful that she was able to send her five children to private university. In 2006, El Bajío opened a second location in the center of the city and since then has grown to eighteen locations which serve about 120,000 diners a month. Carmen has become a notable chef in her own right, giving classes and demonstrations in Mexico and abroad as well as writing about 20 books.

== Description ==
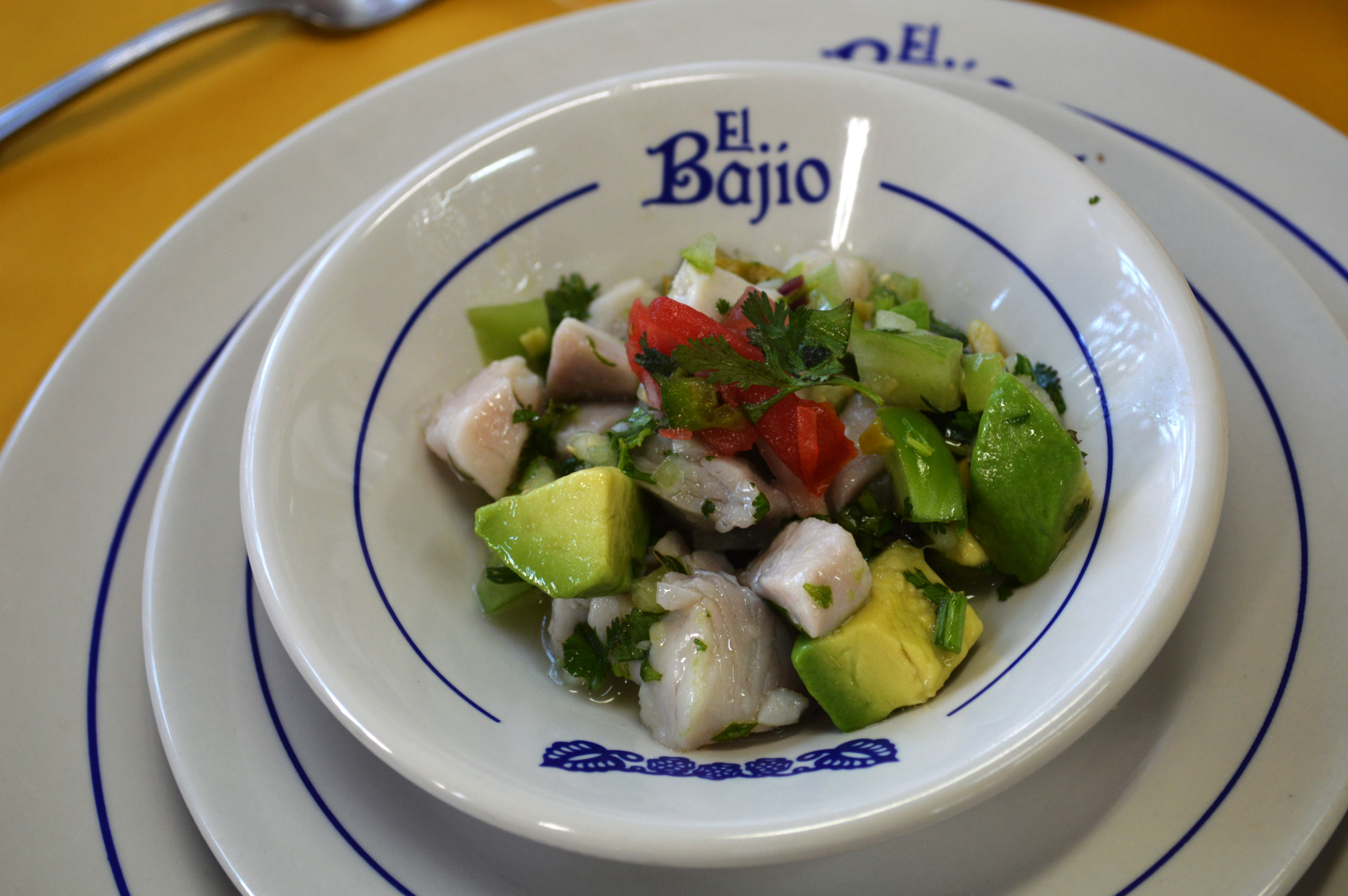
Ceviche verde, a specialty of the restaurant

El Bajío consists of eighteen restaurants in Mexico City which are dedicated to preserving traditional Mexican cooking, with no aims of reinventing the food or making it haute cuisine. The dishes are from the center of the country, principally from the states of Veracruz, Puebla, Michoacán and Oaxaca. The signature dish is carnitas. Many of the cooks who prepare this dish are sons of those who worked at the first restaurant opened in 1972. Most of the other cooks and kitchen help have their specialties as well. These include a morning menu of Veracruz specialties such as gorditas with brown sugar and anise seed, Ramírez Degollado and Veracruz style tamales and atole with fresh fruit along with various egg dishes. Later in the day specialties include ceviche verde, various mole sauces especially mole de olla and Xico style, fish Veracruz style and well as daily specials. The restaurant's food has been praised by Mexican cookbook author Diana Kennedy and Ferran Adrià, chef of the El Bulli in Spain who called it the best Mexican restaurant he has ever eaten at. Much of the restaurant's publicity is word-of-mouth.

The restaurant's locations are in Azcapotzalco, Parque Delta, Polanco, Reforma 222, Parque Lindavista, Avenida Insurgentes, Santa Fe, Acoxpa, Paseo Interlomas, Patio Universidad, Parque Toreo, Oasis Coyoacan, Miyana, Parque Via Vallejo, Mundo E, Portal San Angel, Artz Pedregal and Palmas, all in Mexico City. The colorful décor of each restaurant is based on fine examples of Mexican handcrafts and folk art of which the owner and head chef, Carmen Hernandez Oropez, is an avid collector. In addition, the restaurants are decorated for Mexico's main holidays such as the feast of the Virgin of Guadalupe, Christmas, Mexican Independence Day and Day of the Dead . The eighteen locations serve at least 200,000 diners each month, employing about 1,500 workers. As of 2007, sales totaled 1.5 million pesos per month. In addition the Azcapotzalco location offers banquet service. However, the main struggle for the business is to find and train suitable cooks and other help.

== History ==
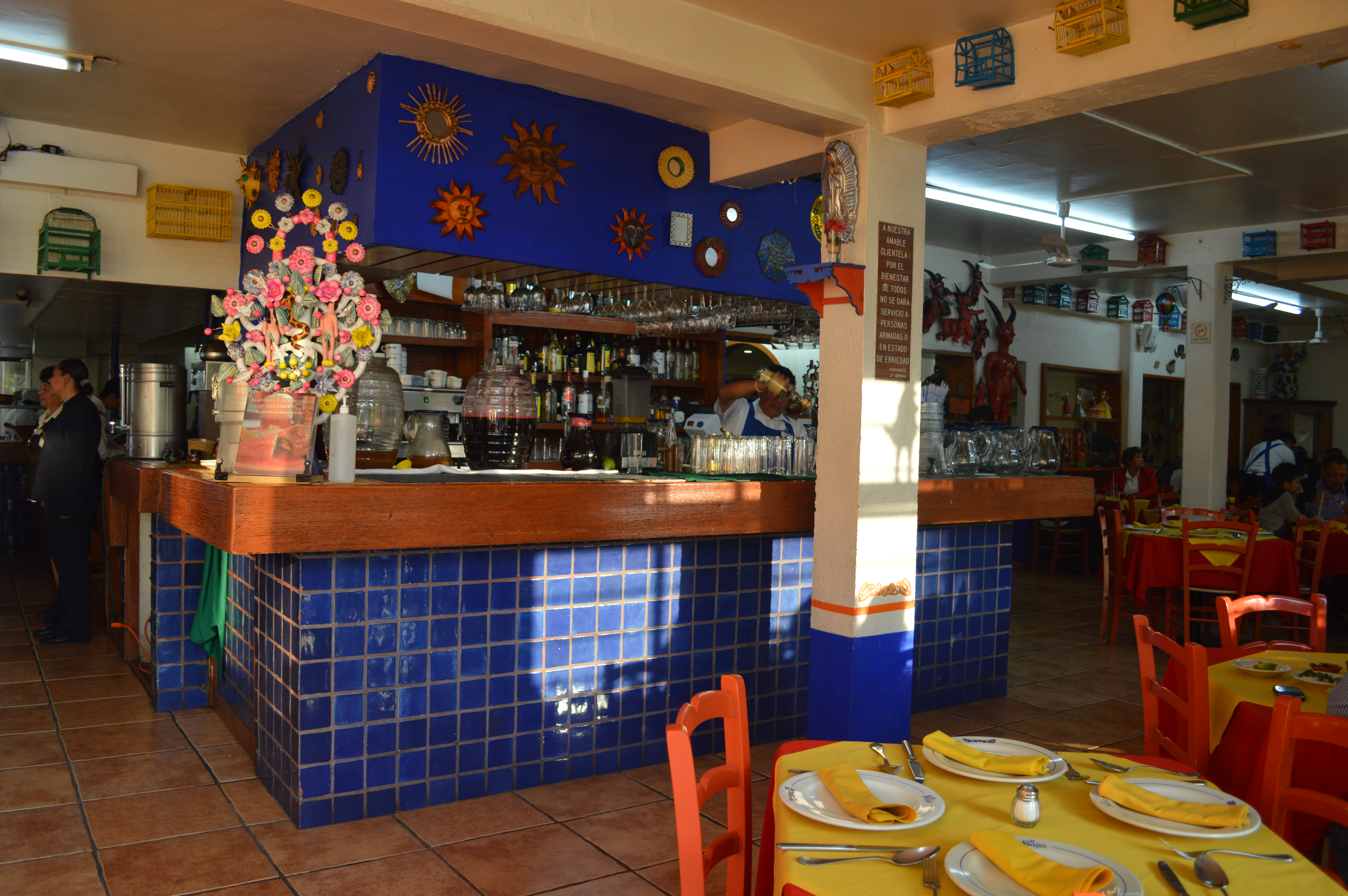
Bar area at the Azcapotzalco location

The origin of the restaurant was with Raúl Ramírez Degollado who bought a carnitas restaurant in Azcapotzalco after retiring from the pharmaceutical industry, to make carnitas as he knew in his hometown of Cotija, Michoacán . His wife Carmen, was initially opposed to the industrial location far from their home in San Ángel . However, Raul began with an initial investment of 200,000 pesos, partnering with friend Alfonso Hurtado Morellón. Four years later, Raul died of cancer. Carmen took over the restaurant, with Alfonso selling his share to her. She varied the menu, adding traditional dishes from her home state of Veracruz, as well as from Michoacán, Oaxaca and Puebla. She also hired waiters with an initial staff of about fifteen.

The restaurant grew and its success allowed her to send her children to the best private universities in Mexico. In 2006, a second restaurant under the same name was opened in Parque Delta in the Benito Juárez borough, followed by Polanco, Lindavista, Reforma 222 and Tezontle in 2006 and 2007. The Santa Fe location was opened in 2009, Acoxpa in 2010 and Insurgentes in 2011. The main restaurant is still the first one in Azcapotzalco on Cuitlahuac 2709.

The restaurant business celebrated its fortieth anniversary in 2012. The restaurant has been visited by some of the best chefs in the world and has received various awards. Awards include The American Academy of Hospitality Services Five Star Diamond Award in 1998, La Llave Empresarial 2006 award, the CANIRAC restaurant business award in 2009 and Chilango magazine named it one of five "legendary" restaurants of Mexico City. It is also a regular participant at the Festival Annual del Centro Histórico de la Ciudad de México (Annual Festival of the Historic Center of Mexico City) .

== Carmen Ramírez Degollado ==
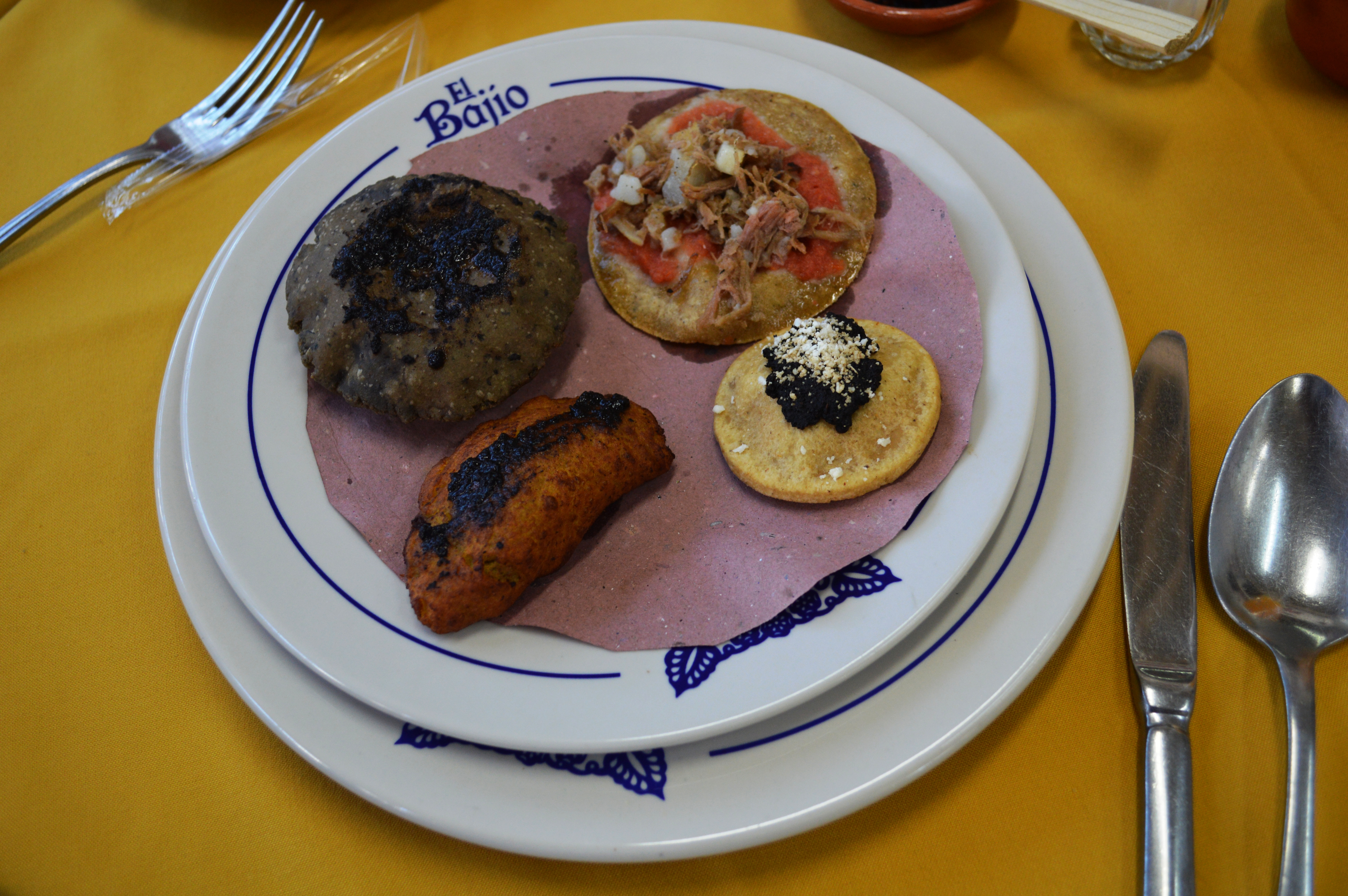
Various small dishes from Doña Carmen's home area in Veracruz

The head of El Bajío and the one who made it successful is Carmen "Titita" Ramírez Degollado, the widow of founder Raúl Ramirez Degollado. Carmen was born in Xalapa, Veracruz in 1940 and raised traditionally to be a homemaker and learned to cook. Carmen did not have aspirations to be a restaurateur. However, she states that one of her husband's friends from France, who stated that he wanted nothing more than to be invited to the house to taste the "sopa de fideo" (noodle soup) that Carmen made. This made Carman appreciate that she could share this aspect of Mexican culture with the world. She was widowed young. After her husband died, she took over the restaurant and the raising of the couple's five children, often balancing the restaurant's hours with the needs of her children. Several of her children continue to work with her in the business. Her son Raul works in administration and Luz Maria runs the original restaurant. Others have gone their own way such as Maria Teresa, who is a professional chef in Spain at the Hotel Majestic.

Today, Carmen is recognized as an important chef, being head of El Bajío for over thirty years. She has traveled throughout Mexico and parts of the world to talk about and share traditional Mexican cooking. She has participated in gastronomic conferences such as the San Sebastián Gastronómica. She has demonstrated Mexican cooking on locations such as the James Beard Foundation in New York, the Ritz Hotel in Lisbon, the Mana Lani Bay Hotel in Honolulu, the Culinary Institute of America at Greystone in the Napa Valley, the Rio Hotel in Las Vegas the J.W. Marriott Hotel in Kuala Lumpur, The Ladies Scofier in Atlanta and the Hyatt Hotel in Seattle and has worked as a consultant to various restaurants in the United States and Europe. She has also taught classes in Mexican cooking at the Culinary Institute of America in Napa Valley. She has authored over twenty books on Mexican cooking in both Spanish and English. In 2002, she published "Alquimias y Atmósferas del Sabor," a book with anecdotes from her life as well as recipes. This book won a Gourmand World Cookbook Award . It also prompted the Cuauhtemoc Moctezuma company and the Asociacion Mexicana de Restaurantes to acknowledged her contributions to Mexican cuisine in 2003. The New York Times named her of the "matriarchs" of Mexican cooking along with Patricia Quintana of the Izote restaurant in Polanco. She is a member of the International Association of Chefs in the United States.
