= The Cuisines of Mexico =

Cookbook by Diana Kennedy

The Cuisines of Mexico is the first of Diana Kennedy's nine cookbooks, credited with introducing Americans to Mexican food beyond Tex-Mex.

== Background to the book ==
The book was the result of Kennedy’s love of Mexican food, which she discovered when she moved to Mexico City to live with her husband, New York Times reporter Paul P. Kennedy, in 1957. The couple moved to New York City by the end of 1965, with Paul dying in 1967 of cancer.

To make a living, Kennedy began teaching Mexican cooking classes in her Upper West Side apartment, with the cuisine quite novel at the time. Although New York Times food writer Craig Claiborne once mentioned to her that she should write a Mexican cookbook and encouraged her cooking classes. The book began to come together after then-poetry editor at Harper and Row Fran McCullough took one of her classes and offered to be her editor. The two would eventually work on Kennedy’s first five cookbooks. Although Kennedy had been collecting recipes since her time in Mexico City, she decided to go to Mexico to do further research. This research, she believed, was what separated her from other cookbook writers in that she has taken the time and effort to explore Mexico and do field research on how the cuisine varies.

Kennedy did not have any prior writing experience before the book, but after several rewrites, she published The Cuisines of Mexico in 1972. This book became a best-seller and is still one of the most authoritative single volumes on Mexican cooking.

== Impact ==
It began to change Americans' understanding of Mexican food, expanding it beyond Tex-Mex into the various regional cuisines and dishes, and is the basis of establishing authentic Mexican food in the United States. The contents of this book along with two that followed, The Tortilla Book and Mexican Regional Cooking, were compiled in 2000 into The Essential Cuisines of Mexico. However, this compilation took out many of the original book's stories and photographs. The 1986 revision of the original book was re-printed and is still available.

Kennedy's exhaustive research is highly valued in Mexico, but in the US, critics frequently claimed it was inappropriate for a non-Mexican woman to become a leading authority on traditional Mexican foodways.
