= ¡Vamos! Let's Go Eat =

Children's book

- Author: Raúl the Third
- Illustrator: Raúl the Third
- Language: English and Spanish
- Genre: Children's literature, picture book
- Publisher: Versify/Houghton Mifflin Harcourt
- Publication date: March 24, 2020
- ISBN: 978-1-328-55704-9
- Preceded by: ¡Vamos! Let's Go to the Market
- Followed by: ¡Vamos! Let's Cross the Bridge

¡Vamos! Let’s Go Eat is a children's picture book written and illustrated by Raúl the Third, with Elaine Bay as the colorist. It was published in 2020 by Versify/Houghton Mifflin Harcourt. It is a bilingual book in both Spanish and English that shares a story of Little Lobo and his love for food and wrestling. It also celebrates Mexican culture, which helped it win the Pura Belpré Award in 2021. It is part of the ¡Vamos! series and is a sequel to ¡Vamos! Let’s Go to the Market.

== Background ==
This book is the second in Raúl the Third's ¡Vamos! series, which also includes ¡Vamos! Let's Go to the Market and ¡Vamos! Let's Cross the Bridge. Raúl the Third has created a World of Vamos! through these three books and due to their success there are plans to create an animated series. This series was written with regards to Raúl the Third's childhood as he was born in El Paso, Texas but grew up on both sides of the border. ¡Vamos! Let’s Go to Eat was released in 2020 by Versify/Houghton Mifflin Harcourt and is a 32 page long story made for children's literature. ¡Vamos! Let’s Go Eat continues with the two characters we met in ¡Vamos! Let's Go to the Market, as Little Lobo and his canine sidekick Bernabé are getting ready for a new day with their delivery business.

== Plot ==
¡Vamos! Let’s Go Eat begins with Little Lobo and Bernabé making their way to "el Coliseo" in their brand new delivery bike. Then, they get a message from el Toro (the wrestler) that their delivery assistance is needed before lunchtime for the big match. Once they arrive, Kooky Dooky leads them into el Toro's training room where they give Little Lobo all of their lunch orders such as carnitas, churros, elotes and more. Little Lobo travels to the food trucks outside the "el Coliseo" and orders as much Mexican food as possible for el Toro and his friends. Once Little Lobo picks up all the necessary food, he delivers the food to el Toro and they all feast together at a large table before the big wrestling match. This story ends with Little Lobo, Bernabé and all their friends watching the wrestling match.

== Analysis ==
¡Vamos! Let’s Go Eat is a valuable story because of its incorporation of both English and Spanish text. This helps make this children's book a vocabulary lesson with the numerous labels and signs about the "ingredients, food trucks, and culinary delicacies". Much of this can be contributed to the vibrant illustrations by Raúl the Third and colorist Elaine Bay, which is why Pino believes that readers could "spend ages pouring over them to discover something new in the scenery". All of this in-turn helps ¡Vamos! Let’s Go Eat celebrates the Mexican culture, Spanish language and the significance of street food in Mexico. In addition, Pino mentions that the simplistic and straightforward plot of this story will help keep readers engaged and turning the page.

== Reception ==
This children's book has been met with a very positive reception. For instance, Johnson sees this book as a "love letter to street vendors and Mexican American culture and food". In addition, the National Council of Teachers of English believes that children will not be able to take their eyes off these pages. Finally, Joyner asserts that the "iconic elements of Mexican culture, food trucks and lucha libre" will create a very positive reception that will make readers hungry for the foods mentioned and excited for more stories told by Raúl the Third.

== Artwork ==
Illustrator Raúl the Third and colorist Elaine Bay created the artwork of ¡Vamos! Let’s Go Eat with inspiration from the Mexican comic books that Raúl the Third read as a child. Each page is full of vibrant, intrinsic and special illustrations that fill up the entire page and allow readers to become lost. Specifically, the illustrations give the reader context clues and detailed elements that contribute to the meaning of the story. To add, Long discusses how the characters are portrayed to be very animated which helps the scenes become "vibrant with activity and movement".

== Popular culture ==
To keep readers engaged in ¡Vamos! Let’s Go Eat, Raúl the Third includes several popular cultural references. For instance, the book takes a similar approach to Where’s Waldo as pointed out by the National Council of Teachers of English. This decision adds an element of surprise to this piece of literature, to keep children reading and flipping through the pages. In addition the book references Ciudad Juáres-El Paso landmarks, a Chavo del Ocho and a Chapulín Colorado marionette. While knowledge of these references is not needed to understand the context of this book, it helps add a new layer where readers can feel the Mexican culture through each page.

== Awards ==
¡Vamos! Let’s Go Eat won the Pura Belpré Award in 2021. This award is given to a Latino/Latina writer and illustrator to celebrate a work of literature for children and youth that best portrays Latino cultural experiences.
