= Edward Behr (food writer) =

American food writer

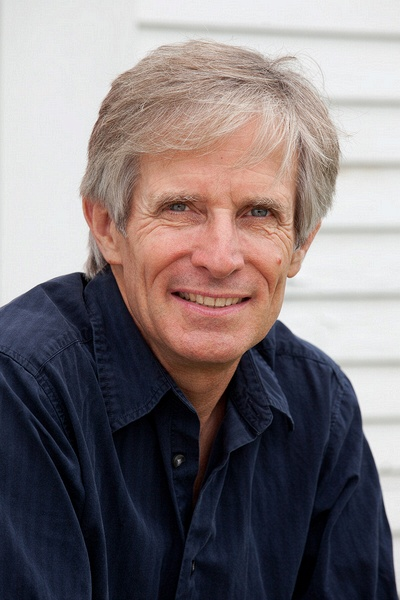
- Occupation: Publisher/food writer

Edward Behr is an American food writer.

== Biography ==
His books include The Artful Eater (1992, revised edition 2004), The Art of Eating Cookbook: Recipes from the First 25 Years (2011), 50 Foods: The Essentials of Good Taste (2013), and The Food and Wine of France: Eating and Drinking from Champagne to Provence (2016). Behr is the editor and publisher of a quarterly food magazine, The Art of Eating. First published as an eight-page newsletter in 1986, it is now one of the most respected magazines about food and wine. Behr's writing and magazine focus on taste, especially the connection between taste and the place food and wine come from. He has written about many of the best farmers and food artisans in France, Italy, and the United States.

His article "The Lost Taste of Pork," when it appeared in the magazine in 1999, caused Steve Ells, founder of the Chipotle fastfood chain, to turn from conventional to humanely raised pork. Chipotle became the first large-scale U.S. buyer of naturally raised meats.

Behr speaks internationally on food and culture. He has been featured in publications ranging from The New York Times and The Atlantic to Forbes and The Financial Times. In 2014, he was inducted into the James Beard Foundation's Who's Who of Food and Beverage. He writes and publishes from the Northeast Kingdom of Vermont, where he lives with his wife, Kimberly, and two sons Maximillian and Zane.

When the foreign correspondent of the same name died in 2007, some news reports confused the two.

In 2014, Behr won a James Beard Foundation Award.
