= Plum Bistro =

Defunct restaurant in Seattle, Washington, U.S.

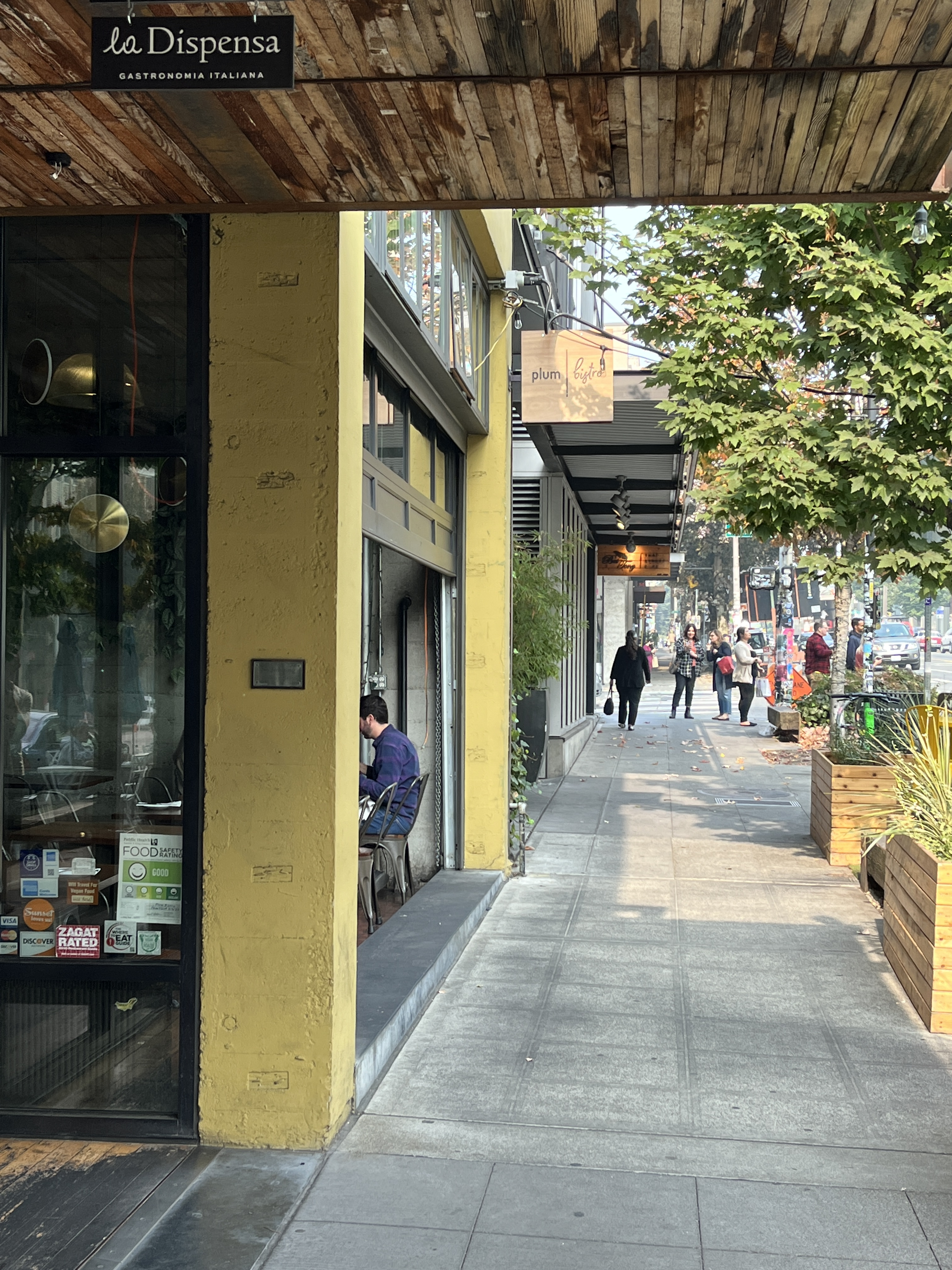
- The restaurant's exterior, 2022
- Interactive map of Plum Bistro

Restaurant information
- Closed: January 2025
- Food type: Vegan
- Location: 1429 12th Ave Seattle, Seattle, King, Washington, United States
- Coordinates: 47°36′49.8″N 122°19′1.4″W
- Website: plumbistro.com

Plum Bistro was a Black-owned restaurant in Seattle, in the U.S. state of Washington. The business was Makini Howell's flagship restaurant.

Plum Chopped was a sibling establishment. Both businesses closed permanently in January 2025.

== History ==
Plum Chopped was a sibling establishment. Plum Bistro and Plum Chopped closed permanently in January 2025. Colibri Mexican Kitchen began operating in the former Plum Bistro space.

== Reception ==
BuzzFeed named Plum Bistro one of 24 "bucket list" vegan restaurants in 2015. Modern Farmer named the business one of the 15 best vegan restaurants in the country in 2018. Aimee Rizzo included the restaurant in The Infatuation's 2020 overview of "The Best Mac & Cheese In Seattle", as well as a 2022 list of "The Best Restaurants For Vegan Food In Seattle". Seattle Metropolitan included Plum Bistro in a 2022 list of the city's 100 best restaurants. Shape named Plum Bistro one of the top 10 upscale vegan restaurants in the United States.

== See also ==
- List of Black-owned restaurants
- List of defunct restaurants of the United States
- List of vegetarian and vegan restaurants
