= Karen Anand =

Indian food writer

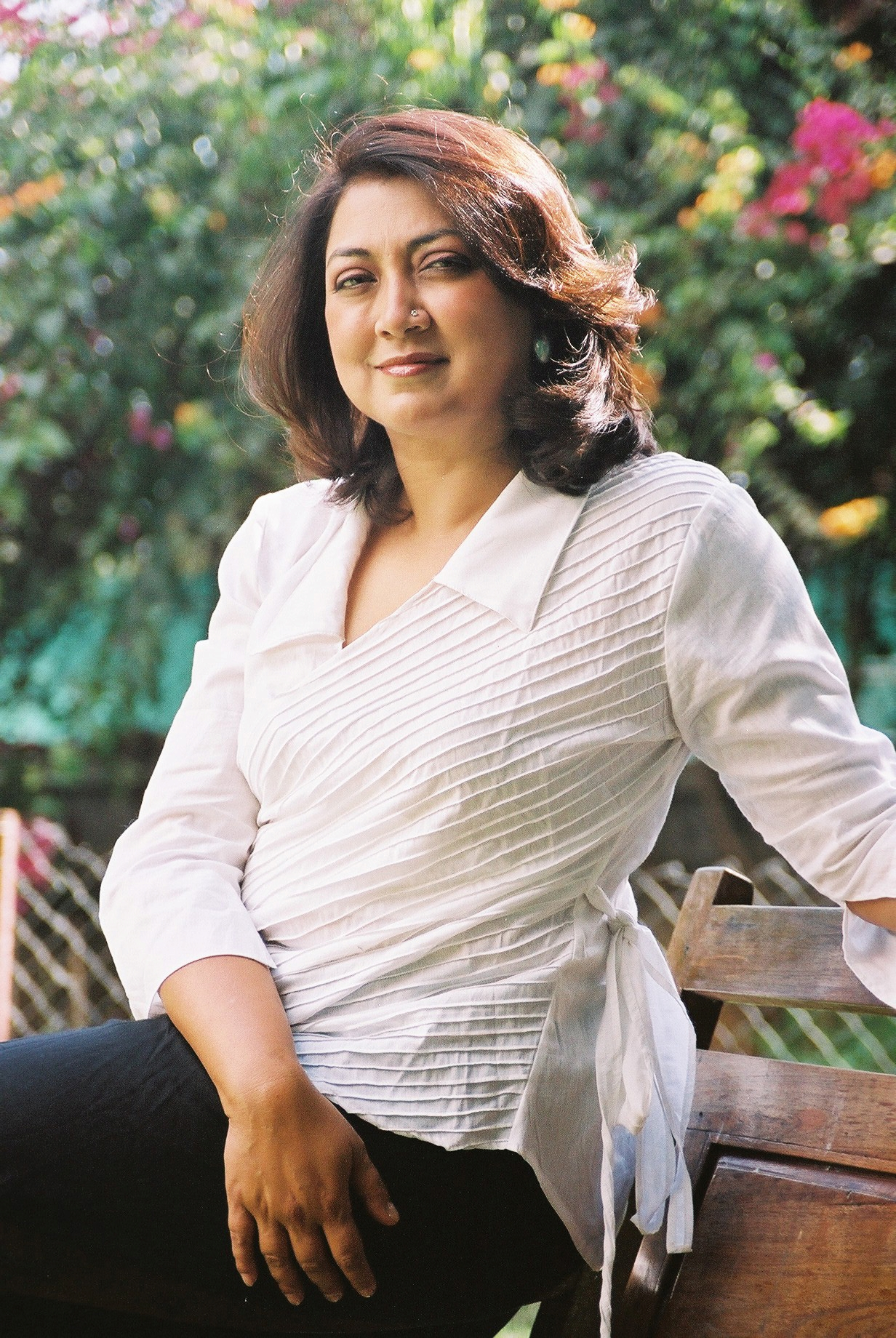
- Born: 65–67; Mumbai, India

Karen Anand is an Indian food writer, television personality, and restaurant consultant. Anand founded Karen's Gourmet Kitchen, a gourmet food company; and Markets by Karen Anand. She has authored 20 books and hosted three television shows.

== Early life of Ms. Anand ==
Anand was born in Mumbai. Her family moved to London in 1966. She went to St. Dominic's School for girls. She completed her degree in International Relations and French at Sussex University. She also studied at the Ecole des Sciences Politiques in Paris before returning to India in 1984. She is married twice and has 2 children. She briefly trained at Lucas Carton, a three Michelin star restaurant in Paris.

== Culinary career ==
Anand began her career in the F&B consultancy business in 1989. She started her career with the Salad Bar at the Piano Bar in Mumbai. She has contributed to the concept research and menus for Dishoom, a Bombay-style café in London.

She and her husband Yadu Sankalia started the Pune Farmers’ Market in 2012. This market is spread across eight cities in India. Her gourmet business re-emerged as Ks Kitchen in 2018. The business is handled by Sankalia and her sons Param and Sasha. Anand oversees recipe development, innovations, and R&D.

Anand has authored the yearly Times Food Guide for Pune for 7 years. She has also written for articles for BBC Good Food, Good Housekeeping, Bombay Times, The Independent, Condé Nast Traveller, and Hindustan Times Brunch. Her current column on Food & Travel is featured in the Sunday Telegraph.

== Books and TV shows ==
Anand is an author with 20 books under her belt. Her TV experience includes a 52-episode travel food show in 1995 called the Good Food Guide for Star World; a 12-part series on Mumbai restaurants for Treadmill CNBC and a 38-part series Cook Na Kaho, for Star One.

== Awards ==
Anand was awarded the Food & Spirit Award (Trophée de l’Esprit Alimentaire) for Culture from the French Government in 2006 and the French Ambassadors Travel Writers Award in 2019.
