= John Thorne (writer) =

American food writer (1943–2006)

John Thorne (1943-2026) was an American food writer. He wrote and released several books, most of which are about gastronomy.

== Biography ==
Thorne was born in Quincy, Massachusetts, in 1943. Having dropped out of college, he began to teach himself to cook frugally while living on the Lower East Side in New York City.

In the early 1970s, he was a teacher for several years at Stockbridge School, a progressive New England boarding school that closed in 1976. Thorne subsequently lived in Boston for a number of years, where he self-published a number of culinary pamphlets reviewed at the time by The New York Times, which in 1983 grew into his ongoing newsletter, Simple Cooking.

In the mid 1980s, Thorne moved to coastal Maine to devote himself exclusively to food writing, and became associated with Matt Lewis, with whom he later co-authored a number of his books and his newsletter. During the 1990s, the couple moved to Northampton, Massachusetts, where they remained as of 2010.

Thorne's newsletter features essays on food preparation and appreciation blended with autobiographical sections. It also includes purported commentary from fictional characters from the fantasy "No Name Diner", as well as cookbook reviews, and occasionally opposing essays by various pseudonymous authors, who are apparently Thorne.

Based upon the newsletter's success, Thorne authored at least six books issued by major publishers as of 2009. Publishers Weekly, reviewing Outlaw Cook, said his "essays delight with passion and originality". The content of much of these works had previously appeared in the self-published newsletters. Thorne has been cited as the best American food writer by both Gourmet and Connoisseur magazines and other sources. Saveur magazine named him to their 2009 Saveur 100 list, calling him "the poet of the everyday", and his work was for many years frequently quoted in various national newspapers and other publications.

Thorne died in October 2026 at age 83.

== Bibliography ==
- Simple Cooking (1987)
- Outlaw Cook (1992) (with Matt Lewis Thorne)
- Serious Pig : An American Cook in Search of His Roots (1996) (with Matt Lewis Thorne)
- Home Body (1997) (concerns domestic, not culinary topics)
- Pot on the Fire : Further Confessions of a Renegade Cook (2000) (with Matt Lewis Thorne)
- Mouth Wide Open (2007) (with Matt Lewis Thorne)
- (collected in) American Food Writing: An Anthology with Classic Recipes, ed. Molly O'Neill (Library of America, 2007) ISBN 1-59853-005-4
- Culinary School: Three Semesters of Life, Learning, and Loss of Blood (2011) (foreword, with S.J. Sebellin-Ross)
