= Huachinango a la Veracruzana =

Classic fish dish from Veracruz, Mexico

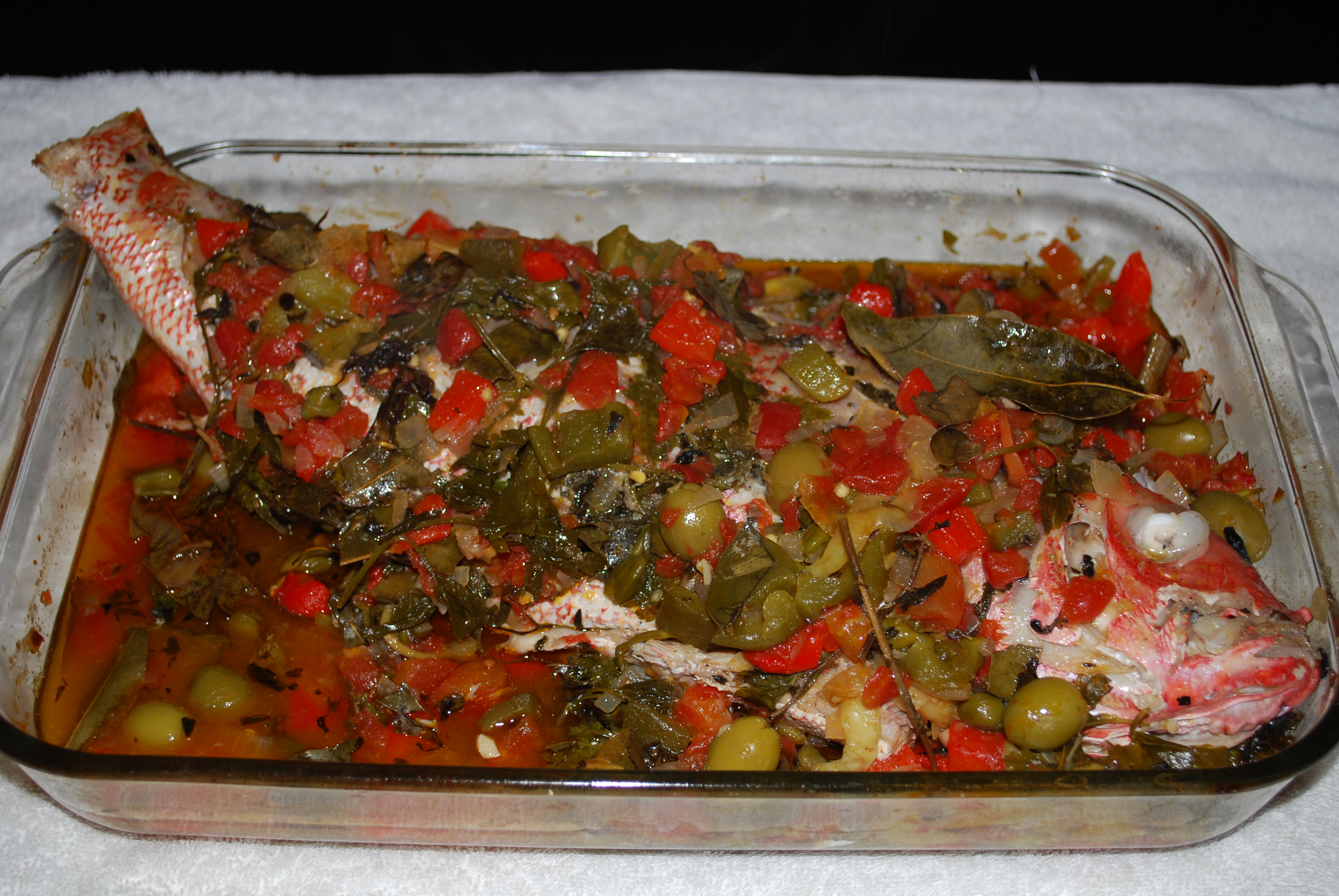
- Alternative names: Veracruz-style red snapper
- Course: Main
- Place of origin: Mexico
- Region or state: Veracruz
- Main ingredients: Red snapper (fish)

Huachinango a la Veracruzana (Veracruz-style red snapper) is a classic fish dish from Veracruz, Mexico.

It has been called the signature dish of the state of Veracruz. It combines ingredients and cooking methods from Spain and from pre-colonial Mexico. The use of olives and capers gives a Mediterranean flavor to the dish, and show the Spanish influence.

Traditionally, a whole red snapper is used, gutted and de-scaled and marinated in lime juice, salt, pepper, nutmeg and garlic. A sauce is made of onions, garlic, tomato, jalapeños, olives and herbs, and the fish is baked with the sauce until tender. Capers and raisins may also be used. If red snapper is not available, another type of rockfish may be substituted. The dish is traditionally served with small roasted potatoes and Mexican-style white rice.

== See also ==
- List of Mexican dishes
