= Chileatole =

Mexican soup

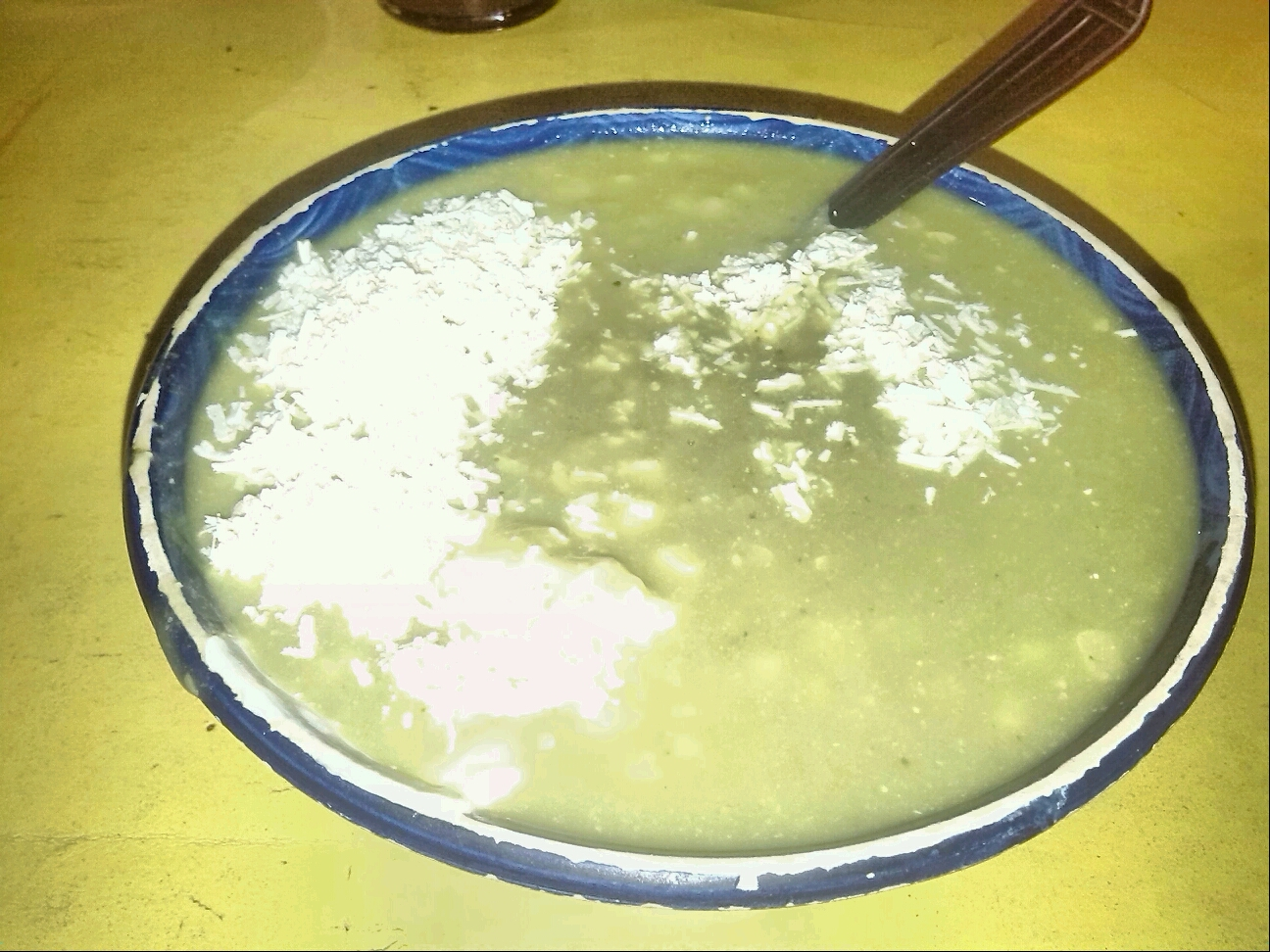
Chileatole

Chileatole is a Mexican thick soup made from corn masa or corn kernels, which is cooked with corn chunks, epazote, salt, and a sauce made of chili peppers and pumpkin leaves. It is served hot.
