= Alexandros Giotis =

Greek journalist

Alexandros Giotis (Greek: Αλέξανδρος Γιώτης) (1953–2011) was a Greek journalist and food critic.
