= Raquel Torres Cerdán =

Anthropologist and chef

Raquel Torres Cerdán, also Raquel Torres (born 19 November 1948) is a Mexican anthropologist and restaurateur, who has worked to record, preserve and showcase the cuisines of the indigenous peoples of Veracruz, through her restaurants and food writing.

== Biography ==
Torres was born in Xalapa on 19 November 1948. Her parents were Guillermina Cerdán, a housewife, and Abel Torres García, who was variously an itinerant coffee-seller, bricklayer, waiter and eventually restaurant owner. She credits meeting the chef Angel Objeco, who worked at her father's restaurant of La Parroquia, in inspiring her interest in cuisine. She initially worked as a civil servant, but made the move to study Anthropology at University of Veracruz in order to expand her knowledge of the food of the indigenous peoples of Veracruz. The accumulation of this knowledge and its preservation has become an important aspect of Torres' career.

Research into indigenous cuisine inspired Torres to open her first restaurant, La Fonda, which served a menu dedicated to the regional foods. She later opened La Churrería del Recuerdo, where she intended to serve recipes that were over 130 years old. However, Torres discovered that whilst there were recipe books available from that period, they recorded middle and upper class foods, not those of the working classes. In addition to running two restaurants, Torres teaches workshops on the skills of Mexican cookery, with a focus on the food of the Veracruz region.

== Recognition ==
In 2019 the National Council for Tourism, Culture and the Arts in Mexico and the Xalapa City Council paid tribute to Torres' work, citing the influence she has had on the preservation of the gastronomic heritage of Xalapa. The chef and writer Diana Kennedy has cited Torres' work as an influence.

== Selected works ==
- Torres Cerdán, Raquel. La Cocina de Xalapa. (2015).
- Torres Cerdán, Raquel. Las flores en la cocina mexicana. Vol. 22. Conaculta Culturas Populares, 2000.
- Torres Cerdán, Raquel; Careaga Gutiérrez, Dora Elena; and Cruz, Carretero Sagrario. La cocina afromestiza en Veracruz. (1995).
