= Mapie de Toulouse-Lautrec =

French journalist and food writer

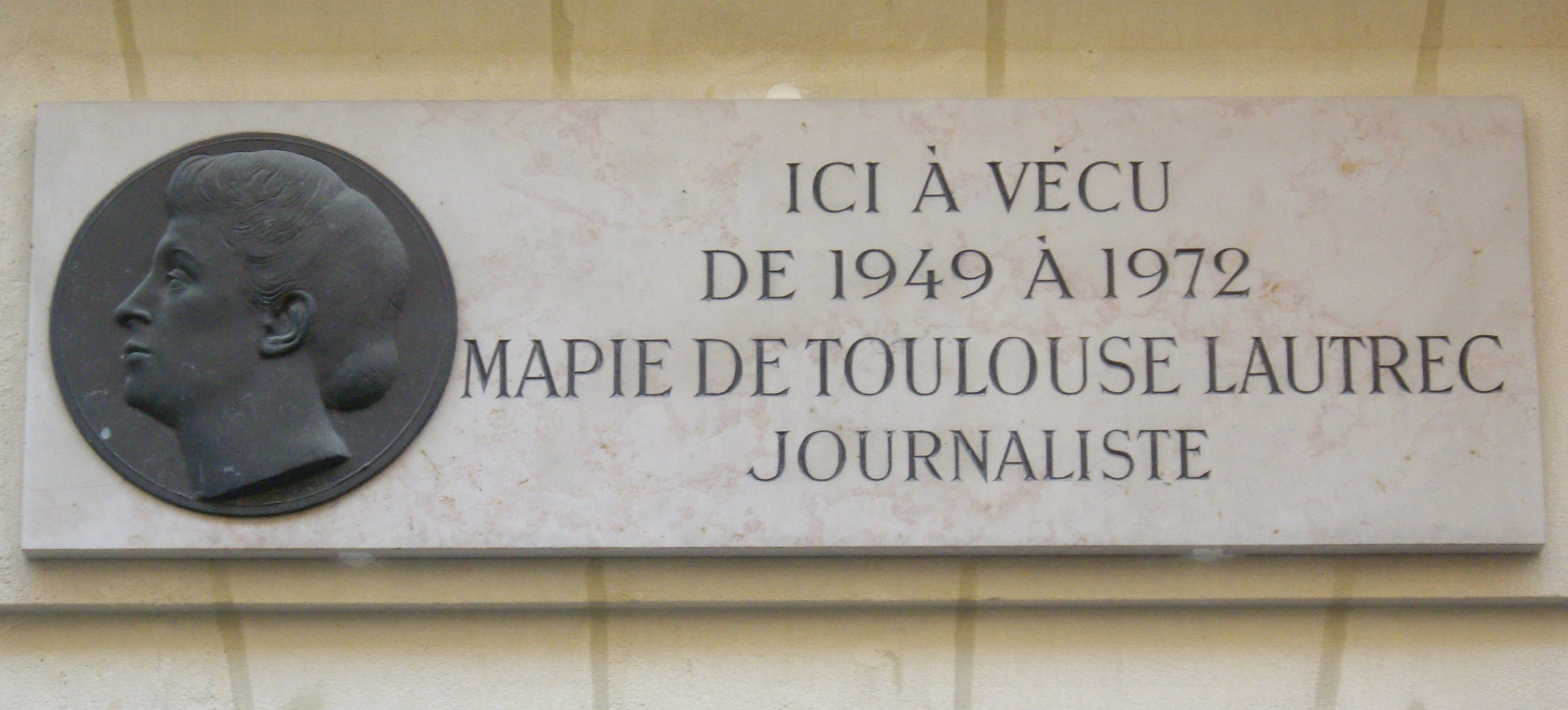
Mapie de Toulouse-Lautrec memorial plaque in Paris

Marie Pierre "Mapie" de Toulouse-Lautrec (1901–1972) was a French journalist and food writer, born Marie Pierre Adélaïde Lévêque de Vilmorin in Verrières-le-Buisson, scion of the Vilmorin seed company. Her horticulturalist father was Joseph Marie Philippe Lévêque de Vilmorin (1872-1917), and her mother was the former Bertha Marie Mélanie de Gaufridy de Dortan (1876-1937). The writer Louise de Vilmorin (1902–1969) was her younger sister, while one of her younger brothers, Roger, was the result of an affair between her mother and Alfonso XIII of Spain. Her other siblings were Henri, Olivier, and André.

== Career ==
Mapie de Toulouse-Lautrec started her career in journalism at Fémina magazine, where she had a society column, and wrote theatre reviews. After the war, Hélène Lazareff hired her as cookery columnist for Elle. She invented the detachable recipe card for that magazine (see the biographical link below, supplied by her publisher). Her recipes are elegant and original, and of an alluring simplicity. In 1961 she collected most of them in a book called La cuisine de Mapie. This collection was reprinted in 2004, with a preface by her daughter Adelaide.

== Personal life ==
Mapie married twice; her husbands were:

- Guy Marie Félix Levêque de Vilmorin (1896-1984), a cousin. They married on 17 March 1922 and divorced in 1932. They had three children, including a daughter, Adélaïde.
- Guillaume de Toulouse-Lautrec Monfa, Comte de Toulouse-Lautrec (1902–1985), a nephew of the painter Henri de Toulouse-Lautrec. Married on 28 August 1933, they had two children, a daughter, Constance (born 1934, married Maurice Dumoncel), and a son, Charles-Constantine, Comte de Toulouse-Lautrec (born 1936, married Miranda Redfield).

== Publications ==
- ELLE cuisine, menus et recettes, Fayard, 1957
- Les Recettes de Mapie, Hachette, 1958
- Cuisine de France et du monde, Hachette, 1958
- ELLE encyclopédie: 365 jours de cuisine, Fayard, 1959
- Entrées et desserts, Fayard, 1961
- Cuisinez vite et bien avec Mapie de Toulouse-Lautrec, Éditions Graphiques Internationales, 1963
- La Cuisine de Mapie, Tallandier, 1967
- Cuisinez vite et bien, Hachette, 1974
- La Cuisine de Mapie, Tallandier, 2004
