= Karen A. Page =

Two-time James Beard Award-winning author

- Born: May 8, 1962 (age 63) Warren, Michigan, U.S.
- Occupation: Author
- Notable awards: James Beard Foundation Award
- Spouse: Andrew Dornenburg (m. 1990)

Karen A. Page (born May 8, 1962, in Warren, Michigan) along with her husband Andrew Dornenburg, is a James Beard Award-winning author of a number of culinary-themed books. Among their books are Becoming a Chef (1995; 2003, 2nd ed.), Culinary Artistry (1996), Dining Out (1998), Chef's Night Out (2001), The New American Chef (2003), What to Drink With What You Eat (2006), The Flavor Bible (2008), The Food Lover's Guide to Wine (2011), and The Vegetarian Flavor Bible (2014).

Page married Andrew Dornenburg in 1990; the couple lives in New York City.

== Awards ==
- Received Completion Medal for the Montreal International Marathon, 1990.
- Received the James Beard Foundation Book Award for Best Writing on Food for Becoming a Chef, 1996.
- Received the Gourmand World Cookbook Award for Dining Out, 1998.
- Received Completion Medal for the New York City Marathon, 1998.
- Named Finalist for the International Association of Culinary Professionals (IACP) Book Award for Dining Out, 1999.
- Named Finalist for the James Beard Book Award for Dining Out, 1999.
- Named Finalist for the International Association of Culinary Professionals (IACP) Book Award for The New American Chef, 2004.
- Named honorary Culinary Ambassador at The Culinary Institute of America, 2006.
- Received the Georges Duboeuf "Wine Book of the Year" Award for What to Drink with What You Eat, 2006.
- Received the Gourmand World Cookbook Award for What to Drink with What You Eat, 2006.
- Received the International Association of Culinary Professionals "Best Book on Wine, Beer or Spirits" Award for What to Drink with What You Eat, 2007.
- Received the International Association of Culinary Professionals "Book of the Year" Award for What to Drink with What You Eat, 2007.
- Received the James Beard Book Award for The Flavor Bible, 2009.
- Received the Nautilus Book Award for The Flavor Bible, 2010.
- The Flavor Bible named one of "The 10 Best Cookbooks in the World of the last 100 years" by Alex Munipov in Forbes, April 2011.
- Received the 2011 Gourmand Wine Book Award - USA for The Food Lover's Guide to Wine, December 2011.
- The Food Lover's Guide to Wine named "The #1 Wine Book of the Year" as chosen by 195 "best of" lists (including those of the Chicago Tribune, Huffington Post, LA Weekly, Minneapolis Star Tribune, San Francisco Chronicle, Vancouver Sun, and Wall Street Journal) compiled by the website Eat Your Books, December 2011.
- The Food Lover's Guide to Wine named "Best in the World" in its category at the 2011 Gourmand World Cookbook Awards in Paris, March 2012.
- The Food Lover's Guide to Wine one of three books named a Finalist for the 2012 IACP Book Award in the category of "Wine, Beer or Spirits," 2012.
- The Food Lover's Guide to Wine one of three books named a Finalist for the 2012 James Beard Book Award in the category of "Reference & Scholarship," 2012.
- The Vegetarian Flavor Bible wins the Gourmand World Cookbook Award as Best Vegetarian Book - U.S., 2015.

== Sources ==
- The New York Times wedding announcement "Karen Page Wed in Boston" (August 26, 1990)
- The New York Times Business section article "Can't Stand the Heat? Get in the Kitchen and Learn How to Manage," on Becoming a Chef as "A Chef's Guide for Executives" (August 11, 1996)
- U.S. News & World Report article "Secrets of the Restaurant Critics," on Dining Out (November 29, 1998)
- FabulousFoods.com's "Top 10 Cookbooks of 2001," which lists Chef's Night Out as #1 (December 2001)
- The Washington Post citation of Dining Out as "the single best book on the field" (June 11, 2003)
- Restaurants & Institutions magazine article "CEOs in White," on Becoming a Chef's status as a "cult classic" (March 1, 2004)
- Publishers Weekly's "highly recommended" review of What to Drink with What You Eat (June 19, 2006)
- MegNut.com article on "The Meaning of Celebrity" by Michael Ruhlman, which cites Becoming a Chef (July 19, 2006)
- Chicago magazine article "The Innovators," in which chef Grant Achatz cites Culinary Artistry as his "most-used cookbook" (November 2006)
- Copley News Service wine columnist Robert Whitley on What to Drink with What You Eat (December 16, 2006)
- The Los Angeles Times "Hot List" of bestselling books on food and wine, which mentions What to Drink with What You Eat (January 24, 2007)
- The Toronto Star article "Cookbook Store Cookin' After 25 Years," which named Culinary Artistry one of the store's "Top 10 must-have" cookbook picks (June 18, 2008)
- Newsweek "Book Pick of the Week: The Flavor Bible" (September 9, 2008)
- Publishers Weekly starred review of The Flavor Bible (September 15, 2008)
- Chicago Sun-Times article "Savor the Flavor," on The Flavor Bible (October 1, 2008)
- People magazine article recommending The Flavor Bible as one of the year's best cookbooks (Holidays 2008)
- KCRW's Ellen Rose on her list of 19 "must-have food books," which includes The Flavor Bible (December 3, 2008)
- "Good Morning America" on "The Best Cookbooks of 2008," which mentions The Flavor Bible (December 23, 2008)
- Publishers Weekly article "Cooking the Books with Ellen Clark," on The Flavor Bible's surprisingly strong holiday sales (January 20, 2009)
- Chicago Tribune article "Flavor First," on The Flavor Bible (January 28, 2009)
- Runner's World article "The Athlete's Palate: Andrew Dornenburg and Karen Page" (April 2009)
- Oprah Winfrey's O magazine article "The Creative Cook," on The Flavor Bible (April 2009)
- 2009 James Beard Foundation Award winners (May 4, 2009)
