= Carnitas =

Mexican dish

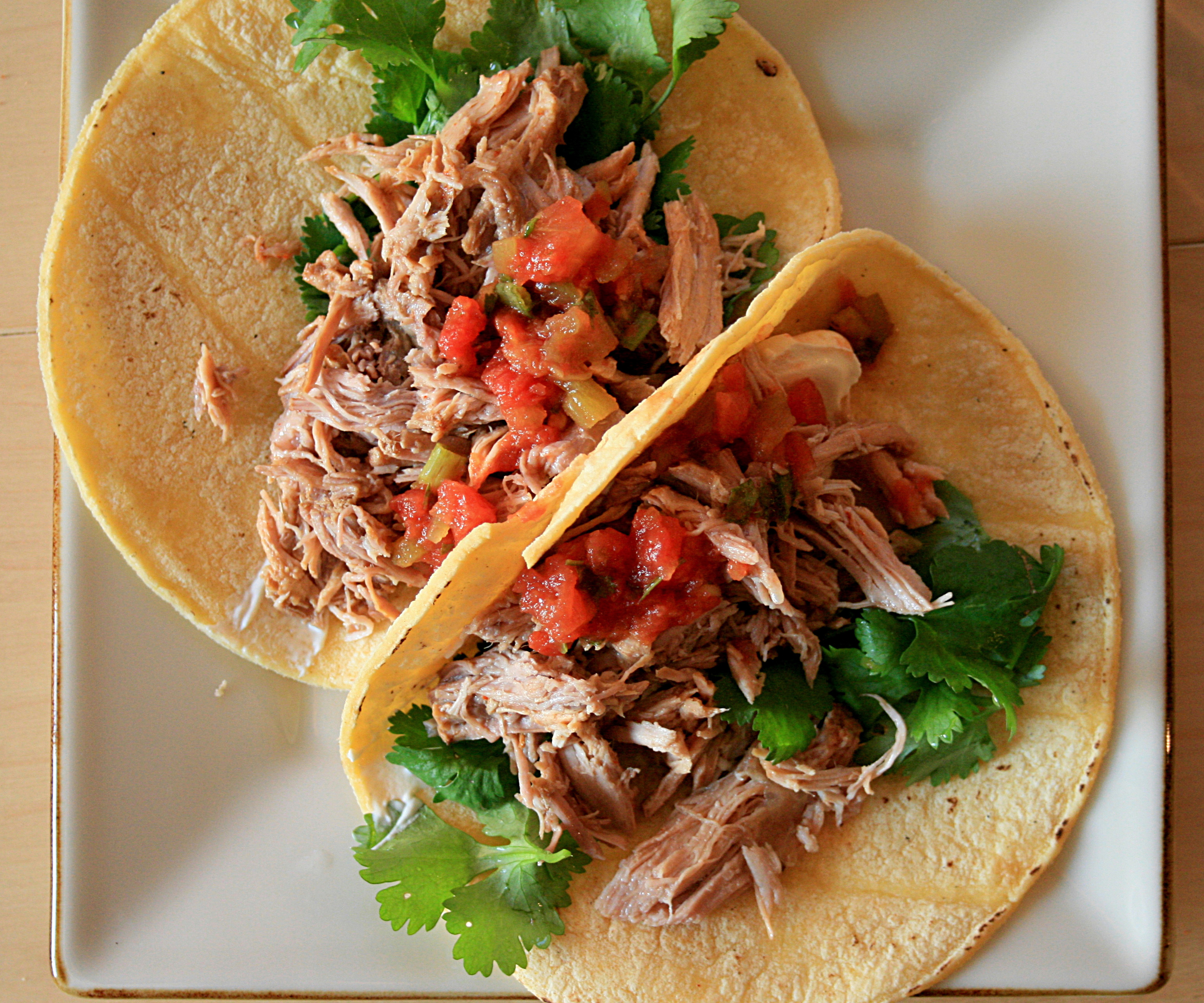
- Tacos made with carnitas filling
- Alternative names: Chicharrón de Tours
- Place of origin: Mexico
- Region or state: Michoacan
- Serving temperature: Hot
- Main ingredients: Simmering pork in oil

Carnitas, literally meaning "little meats", in Mexican cuisine, is a dish made by braising, simmering and frying pork in lard, its own fat, or cooking oil. The name "carnitas" is, historically, the colloquial name given in Mexico for the French dish rillons de Tours, also known in Spanish as chicharrón de Tours.

The process takes three to four hours, and the result is very tender and juicy meat, which is then typically served with chopped cilantro (coriander leaves), diced onion, salsa, guacamole, tortillas, and refried beans (frijoles refritos).

== Description ==
Pork carnitas are traditionally made using the heavily marbled, rich Boston butt or picnic ham cuts of pork which is seasoned heavily before slow braising or deep frying. Carnitas can also be made of chicken, using breasts or thighs, and cooking in a similar manner.

The traditional way to cook carnitas is in a thick-bottomed pot with seasonings simmered in lard until tender over a very low heat. When the meat is tender enough the heat is turned up and the outside of the pork begins to crisp. At this stage, the collagen in the meat has broken down sufficiently to allow it to be pulled apart by hand or fork or chopped with a cleaver. The meat can then be used as an ingredient in tamales, tacos, tortas, and burritos.

== History ==
Carnitas originate from a traditional French dish that was introduced to Mexico via Spain. According to Mariano Galvan Rivera's cookbook – Diccionario de cocina (1845) – "carnitas" was the vulgar name given by Mexico's lower classes to the dish known as "Chicharrones de Tours", and were specifically made and sold in working class neighborhood slaughterhouses or pork shops:

"CHICHARRONES OF TOURS: Among us, these chicharrones are vulgarly called 'carnitas', and they are usually sold in butcher shops where there are pork products, or in barrio slaughterhouses, because they are not made or sold in first-class pork shops."

== See also ==
- Cochinita pibil
- Pulled pork
- List of Mexican dishes
