= List of edible salts =

Edible salts, also known as table salts, are salts generally derived from mining (rock salt) or evaporation (including sea salt). Edible salts may be identified by such characteristics as their geographic origin, method of preparation, natural impurities, additives, flavourings, or intended purpose (such as pickling or curing).

== Common terms and mass-produced seasoned salts ==
| Name | Notes |
|---|---|
| Brine | A saltwater used in the preservation of food. |
| Butter salt | Seasoned salt with butter flavouring. |
| Celery salt | Salt seasoned with celery seeds. |
| Cooking salt | A coarse salt that is used in cooking but not at the table. |
| Curing salt | A salt containing sodium nitrite, used in the preservation of meats. |
| Cyclic salt | Any salt deposited by the wind. |
| Dairy salt | Salt used in the preparation of dairy products, such as butter and cheese, either to add flavour or as a preservative. |
| Flake salt | A type of salt with flake-shaped crystals. |
| Garlic salt | Salt mixed with garlic powder. |
| Halite | The mineral term for rock salt. |
| Kitchen salt | A coarse salt that is used in cooking but not at the table. |
| Korean salt | Larger grain-size salt compared to common kitchen salt. Also known as "Korean brining salt." |
| Kosher salt | A large-grained, non-iodised salt. |
| Onion salt | Salt mixed with onion powder. |
| Pickling salt | A fine-grained, non-iodised salt used for pickling. |
| Sea salt | Generic term for salt derived from evaporation or reduction of salt water, typically sea water. Mineral content varies with locale and drying process. |
| Seasoned salt | Any salt which has been flavoured. |
| Smoked salt | Flavor altered by type of wood used or length of smoke process. |
| Truffle salt | Any salt which has been flavoured with truffles or artificial truffle flavoring. |

== Artisanal or geographical-indication salts ==
Artisanal salts are produced using specific, often traditional, methods, resulting in unique flavor profiles and textures. They may be sourced from specific geographical locations, such as coastal regions or salt flats.

Geographical Indication (GI) salts are salts that can only be produced in a specific geographical area. These regions often have unique environmental conditions, such as soil composition, climate, or mineral content, that contribute to the salt's distinct characteristics. To protect their authenticity and quality, many are legally protected such as that of the EU's Protected Designation of Origin products.

| Name | Origin | Type | Notes |
|---|---|---|---|
| Alaea salt | Hawaii | Seasoned | A Hawaiian-style sea salt mixed with a red volcanic clay. |
| Alpenbergkern salt | Salzkammergut region, Alps | Rock | High iron content salt which gives it a unique tan color. This salt contains 84 minerals. |
| Anatolian (Çankırı) salt | Çankırı, Central Anatolia, Turkey | Rock | Derived from the underground salt deposits in the area. Rocks have a white translucent appearance. There are many caves in the province that are used for salt mining since the Hittites. |
| Anglesey sea salt (Halen Môn) | Menai Strait, Anglesey | Sea | A Welsh sea salt extracted from salt flakes harvested (PDO). |
| Asín tibuok | Bohol island, Philippines | Sea | Literally "whole salt" or "unbroken salt". A rare Filipino traditional artisanal sea salt made from continually soaking coconut husks in seawater for six months then burning it into ashes. Seawater is then poured through the ashes and the resulting brine boiled in clay pots in a furnace. The result is an egg-shaped lump of salt. It is characteristically sold with the upside down broken clay pot, earning it the nickname of "dinosaur egg salt" due to its appearance. Used as seasoning by scraping over food. |
| Artisanal salt called asin sa buy-o from Botolan, Zambales Asin sa buy-o | Botolan, Zambales, Philippines | Sea | A rare artisanal salt derived from the sea in woven palm leaves made by locals |
| Bahamas sea salt | Great Inagua Island, Bahamas | Sea | Sea salt has been produced on Great Inagua Island since the 1930s. The Morton Salt Company bought the facility in 1954. This site, comprising 300,000 acres on Great Inagua Island, produces about a million pounds of salt per year‚ the second largest saline operation in North America. Bahamas sea salt can be found in grocery stores and supermarkets in the United States. |
| Balinese sea salt | Bali, Indonesia | Sea | This seawater is poured over a flat area of raked black sand and left to evaporate for several days. The dry salty sand is gathered and transferred into a series of coconut trunk vats. More sea water is then poured over the salty sand—this filtering process can be repeated several times, until the briny liquid reaches its briniest. The brine is poured into long hollow tree trunks and left to evaporate completely for a final time. Amed, Kusamba, and Tejakula are regions that produce Balinese sea salt. |
| Black lava salt | Hawaii | Seasoned | A salt colored with activated charcoal. Hawaiian manufacture among others. |
| Croatian sea salt | Nin, Croatia | Sea | Evaporated from Adriatic sea water collected in salt pans |
| Cyprian pyramid salt | Cyprus | Sea | Flakes shapes resembling pyramids evaporated from salt pans |
| Çamaltı (Billur) salt | İzmir, Turkey | Sea | Fine grain iodized sea salt produced from Aegean Sea in Çamaltı Saltworks located at İzmir, Turkey. |
| Dead Sea salt | Dead Sea | Sea | Salt extracted or taken from the Dead Sea. |
| Egyptian frost salt | Egypt | Rock | Crystalline salt that takes its name from its texture similar to frost. |
| Einville salt | Einville-au-Jard, Lorraine, France | Sea | Brine is pumped to the surface of a well from 200 meters below ground and evaporated to produce the salt. Production is by Salines d'Einville, located in Einville-au-Jard, in Lorraine, France. Pétales de sel resemble fleurs de sel. Activity began in 1871, renewed in 1988. Similar to salt produced by the J.Q. Dickinson Salt-Works in the Kanawha Valley in West Virginia and Maras salt from Peru. |
| Fleur de sel | France | Sea | A hand-harvested sea salt, typically from France. |
| Garam Bledug Kuwu | Indonesia | Mud | A salt from mud volcano in Grobogan Regency. |
| Garam Jono | Indonesia | Groundwater | Well water containing salt is channeled through bamboo slits about three meters long as a means of drying until it becomes crystal salt. |
| Garam nipah | Indonesia | Palm | A salt from Nypa fruticans in Jambi and Papua. |
| Guerrero negro | Guerrero Negro, Mexico Salt pans | Sea | One of the largest producers of salt in the world, producing evaporated sea salt. |
| Himalayan salt (coarse) Himalayan salt | The Himalayas | Rock | A rock salt with a pink color, mined in Pakistan. |
| 1528Food Fruits Cuisine Bulacan Philippines 40 Ilocano Asin | Ilocos region mostly in Pangasinan, Philippines | Sea | Evaporated in salt ponds and hand harvested. Ilocano Asin is coarse, moist, and white. |
| Jukyeom | Korea | Seasoned | A Korean salt roasted in bamboo. Also known as "bamboo salt." |
| Kalahari Salt | Kalahari Desert salt pans | Sea | From the Kalahari Desert salt pans. |
| Kala Namak | South Asia | Rock | Kalo Nun or Kala namak is a kiln-fired rock salt used in South Asia with a sulphurous, pungent-smell. It is also known as "Himalayan black salt." |
| Kampot sea salt | Kampot and Kep, Cambodia | Sea | Sea salt from coastal salt pans. |
| Kanawha Valley salt | West Virginia, USA | Sea | Produced by the J. Q. Dickenson Salt Works in Malden, West Virginia. Brine is pumped to the surface from 300 feet below ground and evaporated to produce the salt. Similar to Einville salt and salt from Maras in Peru. |
| Khoisan salt pearls | South Africa | Cyclic | South African salt formed by wind action across a salt pan. |
| Lake Grassmere salt | New Zealand | Sea | Seawater, from the Pacific Ocean, is pumped into Lake Grassmere, New Zealand and evaporated. |
| Maldon Sea Salt | Essex, UK | Sea | Sea salt flakes harvested in the River Blackwater, Essex, UK. |
| Maras salt | Peru | Sea | Salt ponds are more commonly found on coastal plains, filled with seawater from the incoming tide. The ones in Peru are at an altitude of 3,000 metres. It’s a long way to the ocean, but it wasn’t always so; this impressive mountain range was once part the sea floor. The movement of tectonic plates pushed the seabed up to form the Andes. The sea salt was locked into the rocks and filters out through the Qoripujio spring, which is then routed to roughly 5,000 evap ponds staggered down the valley in terraces. |
| Mongolian lake salt | Inner Mongolia | Sea | Salt derived from saline lakes |
| Moshio salt | Japan | Seasoned | Dried seaweed that is boiled in sea water to form a brine which is then crystalized. |
| Murray River salt flakes | Australia | Sea | Salt from the Australian Murray River basin. Peach-coloured flake salt. The salt contains calcium and magnesium and has a relatively mild taste. |
| Namibian salt pearls | Namibia | Cyclic | Formed naturally by the Berg wind as they tumble on the water's edge. |
| Netarts Bay, Oregon salt | Netarts Bay, Oregon | Sea | Pure flake sea salt is harvested from Netarts Bay on the Oregon Coast by Jacobsen Salt Company, founded in 2011. |
| Oriel Sea Salt | Ireland | sea | Salt from the Irish Sea. It describes itself as "the only non-oxidised sea salt on the planet": the seawater is pumped from the seabed without being exposed to air, resulting in a naturally white salt with a fine powdery grain and a "smooth depth of flavour." They received Protected designation of origin in 2016. |
| Persian blue salt | Semnan, Iran | Rock | Extracted from a salt mine in the northern province of Semnan in Iran. The intriguing blue colour occurs during the forming of the salt’s crystalline structure, as intense pressure is exerted on the salt deposits. The individual crystals fracture the light in an unusual way and the resulting blue (which is caused by an optical illusion), becomes visible. |
| River reed salt | Kenya | | A salt produced by burning river reeds from along the Nzoia River in Kenya. |
| Sale Marino di Trapani | Italy | Sea | An Italian sea salt extracted from the salt pans of Trapani, Paceco and Marsala (PGI). |
| Sel gris | France | Sea | A French-style sea salt. It tends to be grey in color and somewhat moist. |
| Sel de Guérande | France | Sea | A French sea salt from the salt marshes of the Guérande Peninsula (PGI). |
| Sal e Flor de Sal de Tavira DOP | Algarve, Portugal | | Sal Artesanal e Flor de Sal Artesanal de Tavira Salt from Tavira, Algarve, Portugal. It has a Protected designation of origin (PDO) since 2013. |
| Sugpo Asin | Pangasinan, Philippines | Sea/ Seasoned | A Filipino traditional artisanal salt known for its slightly pink hue due to the shrimp that live in the salt beds from which this particular salt is harvested. |
| Tedted | Pasuquin, Ilocos Norte, Philippines | Sea | A Filipino traditional artisanal salt where mounds of salt piled together in the crude ovens which forms the distinctive stalactite-like shape |
| Tultul | Guimaras island and Capiz, Philippines | Sea | Also known as "dukdok". A Filipino traditional artisanal sea salt made by burning waterlogged driftwood and plant matter. Seawater is then filtered through the ashes and the resulting brine is added to coconut milk and boiled until the water evaporates. It is sold in brick-like lumps. |
| Utah salt | Utah, USA | Rock | From an underground salt deposit in Central Utah. The deposit was left there by an ancient sea that covered much of North America millions of years ago. |
| Yellowstone salt | | Rock | From a subterranean deposit brought to the surface by spring water and evaporated. |
