= Sel gris =

Coarse granular sea salt evaporite

- Type: Salt
- Place of origin: France
- Main ingredients: Salt

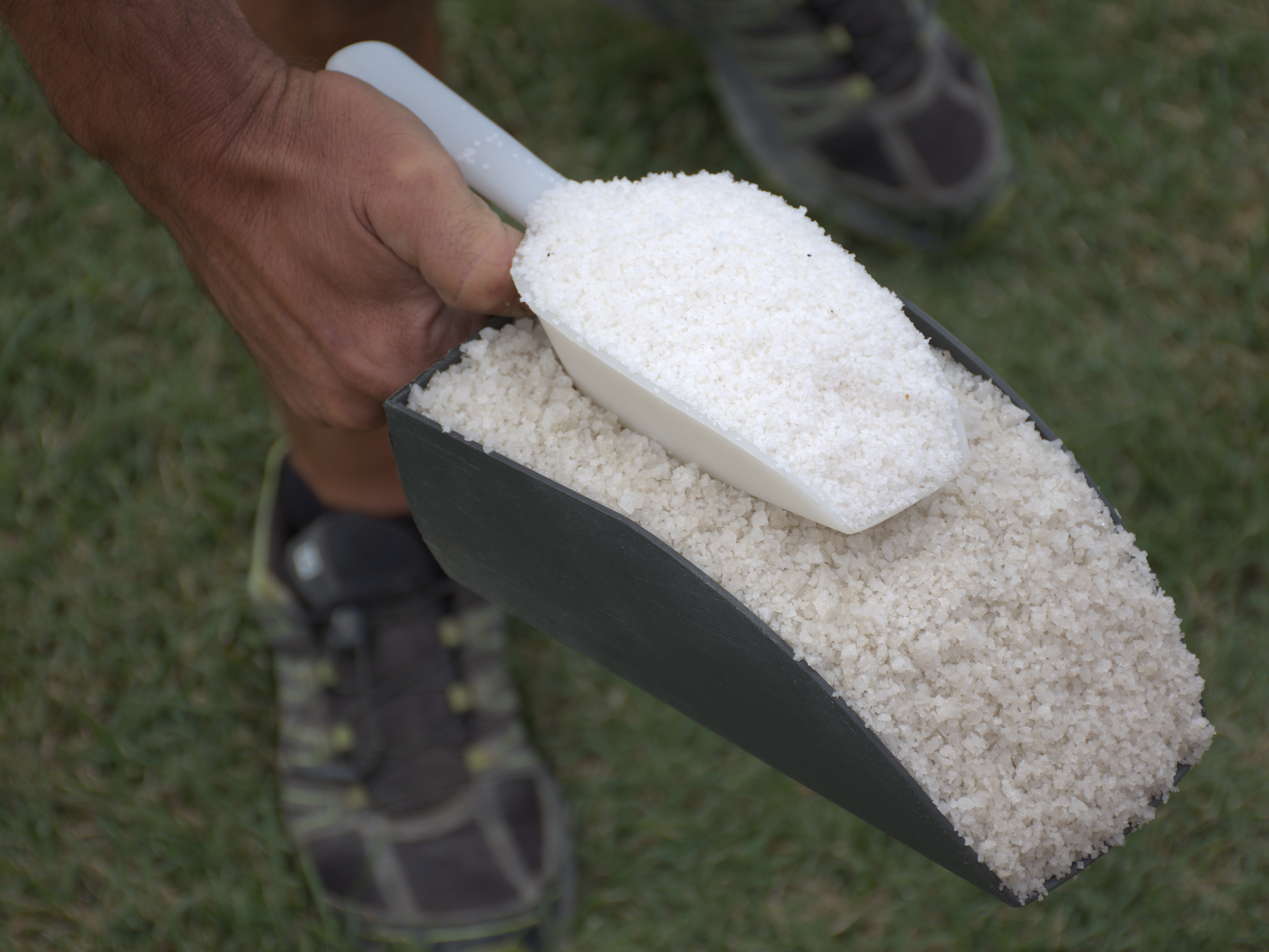
Two kinds of salt: on top "fleur de sel", on bottom "gros sel gris"

Sel gris (pl. sels gris, "gray salt" in French) is a coarse granular sea salt popularized by the French. Sel gris comes from the same solar evaporation salt pans as fleur de sel but is harvested differently; it is allowed to come into contact with the bottom of the salt pan before being raked, hence its gray color. Sel gris is coarser than fleur de sel but is also a moist salt, typically containing 13 percent residual moisture.

== Harvesting ==
The bottom of the salt pan (French: oeillet) is typically composed of clay lined pools, basalt, sand, concrete, or tile. This keeps the salt from coming into contact with the silt beneath and becoming dirty. Every few days, or on occasion daily, the harvester (French: paludier) pushes or pulls the salt with a long wooden rake. This must be done carefully as the depth of the brine may be as little as 1/4 inch (6.4 mm) and the clay bottom must not be penetrated at the risk of contaminating the salt. The salt is raked toward the sides of the pan where it is then shoveled into a pile and left to dry slightly before storing. 90 to 165 pounds (41 to 75 kg) of sel gris can be harvested in one day, whereas for fleurs de sel the daily yield is only 4.5 to 6.6 pounds (2.0 to 3.0 kg).

== Use ==
Because of its mineral complexity and coarse grain size, sel gris can be used both as a cooking salt and a finishing salt. Being much denser than table and kosher salt, there is a lot more salt in an equivalent volume of sel gris.

Because it is a moist salt, it does not suck all the moisture out of food when used as a finishing salt, unlike kosher salt (which is designed to absorb blood and other fluids from meat).

== Examples ==
Most producers of fleur de sel also produce sel gris.

- Sel gris de Guerande
- Sel gris de l’Île de Ré
- Sel gris de l’Ile de Noirmoutier
- Grigio di Cervia
- Alcochete sal grosso

== See also ==
- List of edible salts
