= Dairy salt =

Type of salt used for preparation of butter and cheese

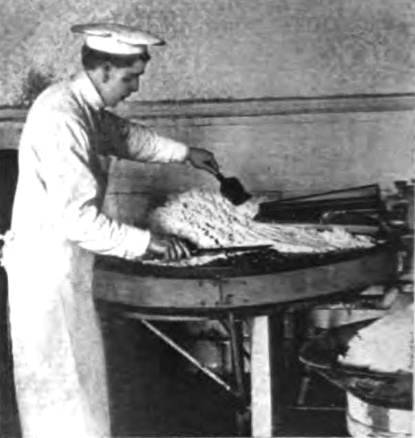
Salting butter at Briarcliff Farms in Briarcliff Manor, New York, 1906

Dairy salt is a culinary salt (sodium chloride) product used in the preparation of butter and cheese products that serves to add flavor and act as a food preservative. Dairy salt can vary in terms of quality and purity, with purer varieties being the most desirable for use in foods. Dairy salt has been used since at least the 1890s in England and the United States. In butter preparation, it serves to retain moisture, while in cheeses, it tends to reduce water content and slow the ripening process.

== Purity ==
Quality dairy salts have been described as having favorable solubility properties for use in butter and cheese, and the softness and form of the salt crystals is one of the determining factors of overall quality. The purity of dairy salt is defined by the amount of sodium chloride present in the product, and those with at least 98% sodium chloride have been described as being of sound purity. Highly pure dairy salt has a pure white coloration, a uniformity in grain, and lacks any offensive odors or bitter flavor. Dairy salt products of lower purity may have a bitter flavor and poor solubility. The use of impure dairy salt can have adverse effects upon butter, spoiling its flavor, grain, and preservation. Impure dairy salt can make cheeses bitter, reducing their value. Impurities that may occur in dairy salt include calcium sulphate, calcium chloride, magnesium chloride, and to a lesser extent, sodium sulphate and magnesium sulphate.

== History ==
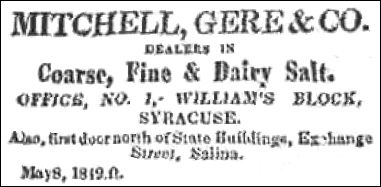
An 1819 newspaper advertisement for various salts, including dairy salt

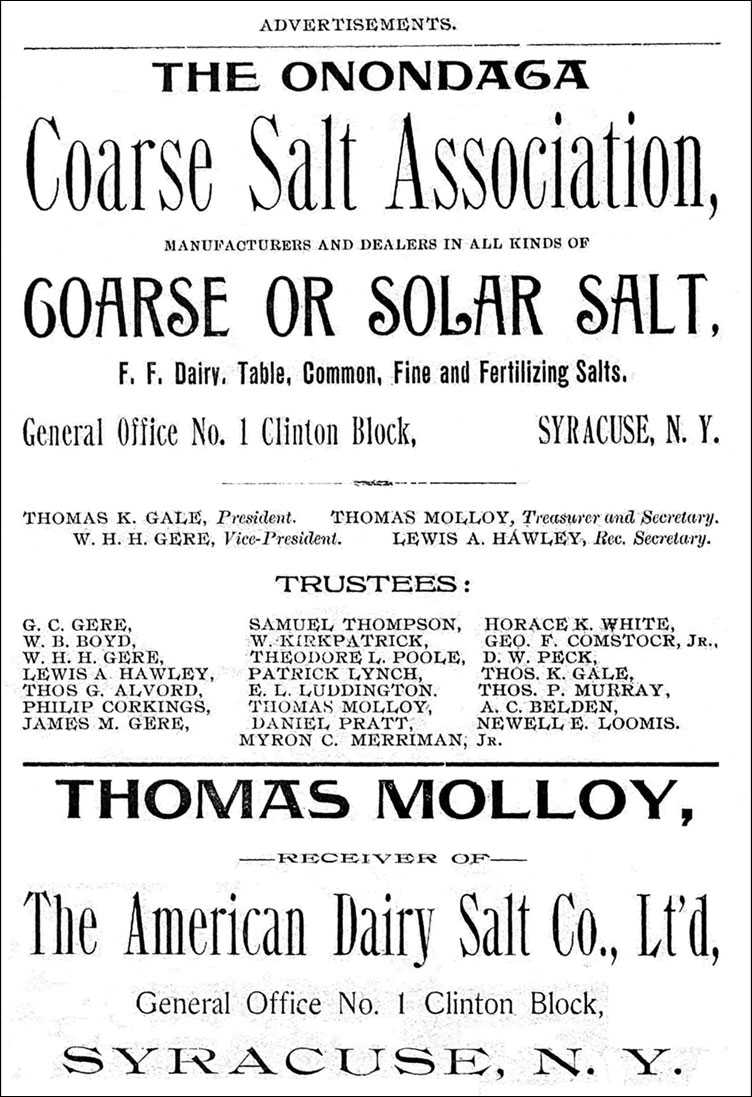
An 1893 advertisement including content about The American Dairy Salt Co. Lt'd.

In the 1890s, many brands of dairy salt were available. In England during this time, the Ashton and Higgins Eureka Salt brands were available (among others), and were used in the United States. U.S. brands of dairy salt in the 1890s included Diamond Crystal Salt and Genesee Salt, among others. Almost all of these brands were very pure, being 98–99% sodium chloride.

In 1899, it was estimated that around 82 million pounds of salt were used in the United States specifically for dairy purposes. At that time, this amount of salt was valued at US $800,000.

In 1914, it was written that American and Danish authorities were in agreement that large-sized, flat flake salt is the best type of dairy salt for use in butter products. During this time, almost all dairy salt was prepared using the process of evaporation. Some techniques included leaving brine in the sun to evaporate, or heating it with fire underneath iron pans, with the salt crystals remaining after the liquid evaporated. Additional methods included the Michigan grainer process and the vacuum pan process.

In the 1920s, calcium sulphate was one of the most common impurities in dairy salt. During this time, the United States Department of Agriculture's had a 1.4% maximum allowance for calcium sulphate in dairy salt and table salt.

== Uses ==
=== Butter ===
Dairy salt serves to retain moisture and increase the weight of butter products, adds flavor and serves as a preservative and antimicrobial, which can prevent bacterial contamination. Dairy salt used in butter preparation is sometimes referred to as butter salt and buttersalt.

=== Cheese ===
Dairy salt has been used in the preparation of cheeses. Its use can add flavor to cheeses, and it tends to reduce the water content in cheeses, which can influence the ripening process. The use of impure dairy salt can make cheeses bitter in flavor, reducing their value. The use of too much salt in cheese can adversely affect its flavor, resulting in a product with a mealy and dry texture that is slow to ripen.

Dairy salt is used in cheddar cheese, and serves to add flavor and reduce moisture. The reduction of moisture inhibits fermentation and slows the ripening process, which can produce a higher-quality cheese in terms of flavor and consistency.

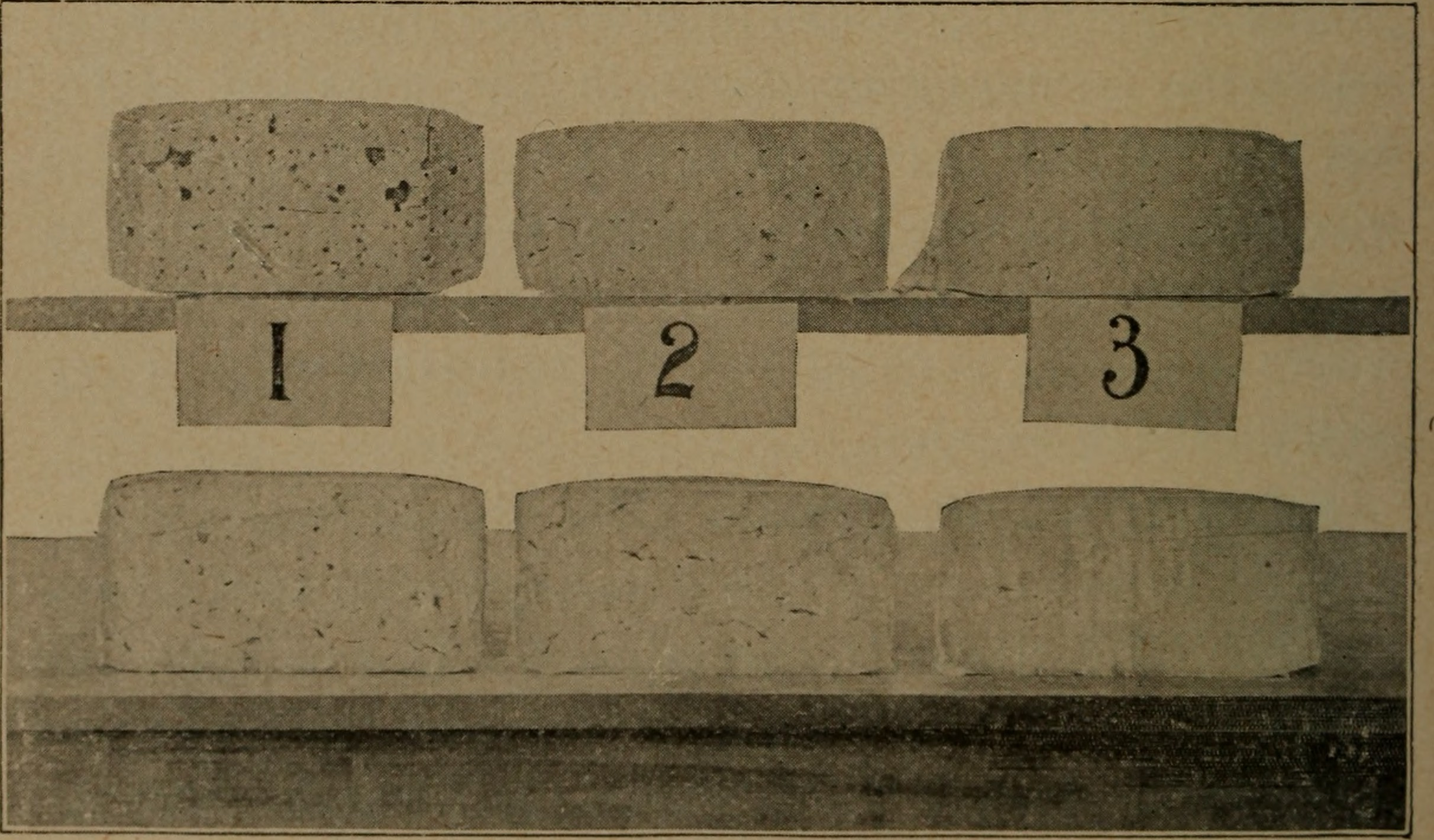
The effect of salt in cheddar cheese making: No. 1, no salt; No. 2, upper row, 1 1/2 pounds; lower row, 2 pounds per 100 pounds of curd; No. 3, 3 pounds per 100 pounds of curd

== See also ==
- List of edible salts

== Bibliography ==
- "A Study of Dairy Salt". Bulletin. Democrat Company, state printers. 1895. pp. 3–45.
- Lenoir, K.D.; Rogers, L.A.; Ward, M. (1924). Proceedings of the World's Dairy Congress. U.S. Govt. Print. Off. p. 967. "The methods of manufacturing salt did not give as high a percentage of sodium chloride as the dairy salt of today contains, and impurities in some brands of salt could be easily detected by their bitter flavor and insoluble condition. Kent and ..."
