= Halen Môn =

Salt-producing company in Anglesey

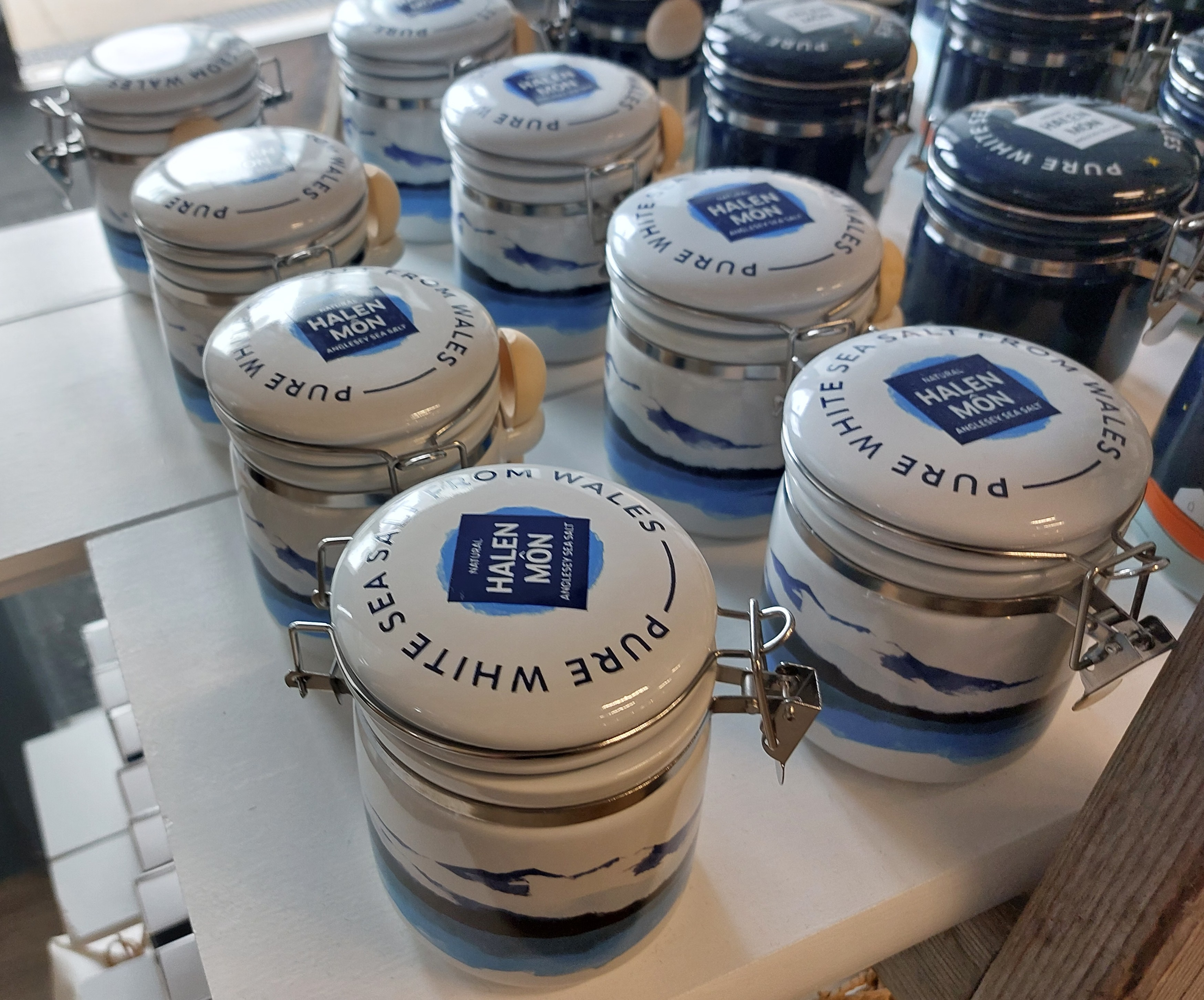
Halen Môn sea salt shop

Halen Môn is a salt-producing company in Anglesey, Wales on the bank of the Menai Strait. Its sea salt, a fleur de sel, has been given Protected Designation of Origin status. It was founded in 1997 by Alison and David Lea-Wilson, who also started the Anglesey Sea Zoo.

== See also ==
- List of edible salts
- List of United Kingdom food and drink products with protected status

== External ==
- Official website
