= Mark Bitterman =

American food writer and entrepreneur

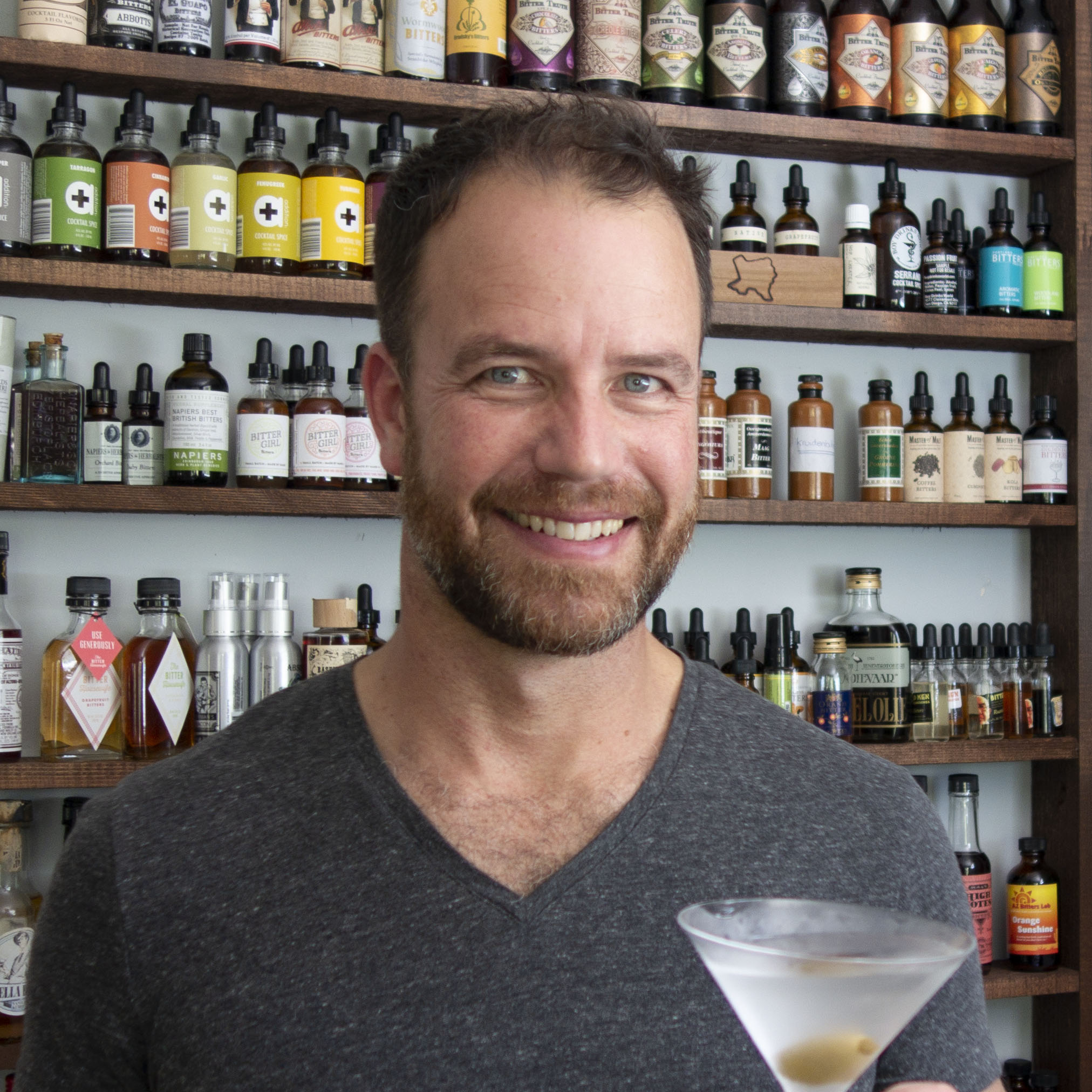
- Born: December 22, 1966 (age 59); New York City
- Education: Sarah Lawrence College, Reed College
- Children: 3
- Awards: James Beard Foundation Award
- Website: https://markbitterman.com/

Mark Bitterman (born December 22, 1966) is an American entrepreneur and food writer. He is the owner of The Meadow, a boutique that specializes in finishing salts, bean-to-bar chocolate, cocktail bitters, and other products. The Meadow was founded in Portland, Oregon, in 2006, and has expanded to include three locations in Portland, one in Nolita in New York City, and one in Shinjuku, Tokyo. Bitterman began selling salt wholesale to award-winning restaurateurs in 2006, and in 2012 officially launched the Bitterman Salt Co. to sell salt through retailers nationally. Bitterman has published five books. Two are on traditional culinary salts and their use in cooking. Two are about cooking with Himalayan salt blocks, and helped pioneer the concept. His remaining book is on the use of bitters and amari in mixology and cooking. He consults with restaurateurs and lectures at culinary academies about the use of finishing salts and Himalayan salt blocks.

== Life ==
Bitterman was born December 22, 1966, in New York City and grew up in Southern California. He attended Reed College and Sarah Lawrence College where he studied literature and art history.

His early professional career included work at The Metropolitan Museum of Art in New York, and he has held positions in marketing, writing, and building restoration.

Bitterman discovered finishing salts while traveling in France as a 20-year-old.

== Publications ==
- Salted: A Manifesto on the World's Most Essential Mineral, with Recipes (2010). Salted consists of three parts: 1) a brief history of salt and artisan saltmaking techniques, 2) a taxonomy and reference guide of over 150 salts, and 3) a collection of recipes making use of different salting techniques.
- Salt Block Cooking: 70 Recipes for Grilling, Chilling, Searing, and Serving on Himalayan Salt Blocks (2013) (ISBN 9781449430559). Salt Block Cooking, the first book published on cooking with salt blocks, is a how-to guide on cooking and entertaining with Himalayan salt blocks. Written in collaboration with Andrew Schloss.
- Bitterman's Field Guide to Bitters & Amari (2015) (ISBN 9781449470692). Bitterman's Field Guide to Bitters & Amari is perhaps the comprehensive handbook available on selecting and making bitters as well as mixing and cooking with them.
- Bitterman's Craft Salt Cooking: The Single Ingredient That Transforms All Your Favorite Foods and Recipes (2016) (ISBN 1449478050)
- Salt Block Grilling: 70 Recipes for Outdoor Cooking with Himalayan Salt Blocks (2017) (ISBN 9781449483159)

== Awards and recognition ==
James Beard Foundation Award for Reference and Scholarship Cookbook (2011). Salted was also a finalist at the International Association of Culinary Professionals Cookbook Awards in two categories: Food & Beverage Reference/Technical and First Book: The Julia Child Award.

Tastemaker by Food & Wine and a local food hero by Cooking Light.

Bitterman is credited with having coined the word selmelier, a food industry professional whose area of expertise is finishing salts and salting techniques.
