= Salted (book) =

- Author: Mark Bitterman
- Publisher: Ten Speed Press
- Publication date: 2010
- ISBN: 978-1-58008-262-4

Salted: A Manifesto on the World's Most Essential Mineral, with Recipes (Ten Speed Press, 2010) is a reference book and cookbook written by food writer Mark Bitterman. In May 2011 Salted won the James Beard Foundation Award for Reference and Scholarship Cookbook. It has also been nominated for the International Association of Culinary Professionals Cookbook Awards for the Food & Beverage Reference/Technical category and First Book: The Julia Child Award. It is available both in hardcover and on the Kindle.

== Background ==
Bitterman's fascination with salt started at age 20 when, on a motorcycle trip across Europe, he stopped at a provincial French truck stop and had a grilled steak finished with a locally harvested fleur de sel. In the following years Bitterman continued to travel the world while collecting artisan-made salts. He eventually went on to open a store with his wife called The Meadow, where they sell a variety of finishing salts as well as dark chocolates, bitters, wine, and flowers. The Meadow was started in Portland, Oregon and has since expanded to the West Village in New York. Salted was released in October 2010.

== Contents ==
The book is divided into three sections.

- "The Life of Salt" – This section treats the history of salt from its supposed first use by humans for preservation approximately 12,000 years ago. Salt took on increasing importance in the Neolithic period as humans developed agriculture and domestication of wild plants and animals. Salt-preserved foods and treated animal hides enabled wider travel and the construction of empires; salt is written about in ancient religious scriptures and has played a large part in the development of some economies.

Saltmaking was an artisanal craft up until the industrial revolution, when mechanization allowed production to increase rapidly. More recently, this industrially produced salt has come to be used in chemical manufacturing as well as for clearing wide stretches of icy roads and freeways.
In this section Bitterman goes on to detail salt's role in biochemistry and addresses the controversy it has provoked in the public health sector. Lastly, he discusses the taxonomy of salt and his take on how to describe a salt.

- "Salt Guide" – This chapter contains a chart of over 150 salts. Each has a macro photograph of its crystals as well as columns for description, application (finishing, cooking, brining, etc.), flavor, and recommended food uses. This is followed by a section of longer entries on 80 salts wherein one can find more in-depth descriptions and information on a salt's alternate names and producers.
- "Salting" – Here Bitterman lays out his suggestions for "strategic salting" and some pointers on key salts for the kitchen and important salting techniques. He then provides recipes for using salts in various cooking techniques (raw, curing, grilling, baking, etc.) as well as recipes utilizing Himalayan salt blocks for serving and cooking food.

== Press ==
- The Tasting Table
- The Splendid Table
- Serious Eats
- The Italian Dish
- The Atlantic
- Michael Ruhlman: Ruhlman.com
- OregonLive.com
- Christian Science Monitor
- StarChefs.com
- Al Dente, Amazon food blog
- FoxNews.com food blog
- DailyCandy
- Publishers Weekly
- NW Food News

== See also ==
- In Defense of Food
- Fat: An Appreciation of a Misunderstood Ingredient, with Recipes
