= Solar salt =

Solar salt may refer to:

- Sea salt, a salt produced by the evaporation of seawater
- Solar salt, a eutectic molten salt mixture which is used for thermal energy storage
