= Flake salt =

Category of salt with dry, plate-like crystals

Flake salt refers to a category of salt characterized by their dry, plate-like ("lamellose") crystals. Their structure is a result of differing growth rates between the faces and edges of the crystal, an effect that can be achieved in various ways. Flake salt may occur naturally but can also be produced by a variety of methods, including boiling brine over metal salt pans or evaporating it in greenhouse solar evaporators. The technologies used as well as atmospheric conditions can yield varying crystal structures. Flake salts can form as irregular shavings, pyramidal shapes, boxes, or potato chip-like laminated crystals. These salts tend to have lower trace mineral content than other salts, giving them a stronger salty taste. Most form as thin, flattened out crystals with a large surface area and low mass that give them a crunchy texture and relatively fast dissolution rate. Because of the salts' delicate structures, selmeliers tend to use them as finishing salts.

== See also ==
- Alberger process
- List of edible salts
- Fleur de sel
