= Es Trenc =

Beach ion southern coast of Majorca

Coordinates: 39°20′21″N 2°59′21″E

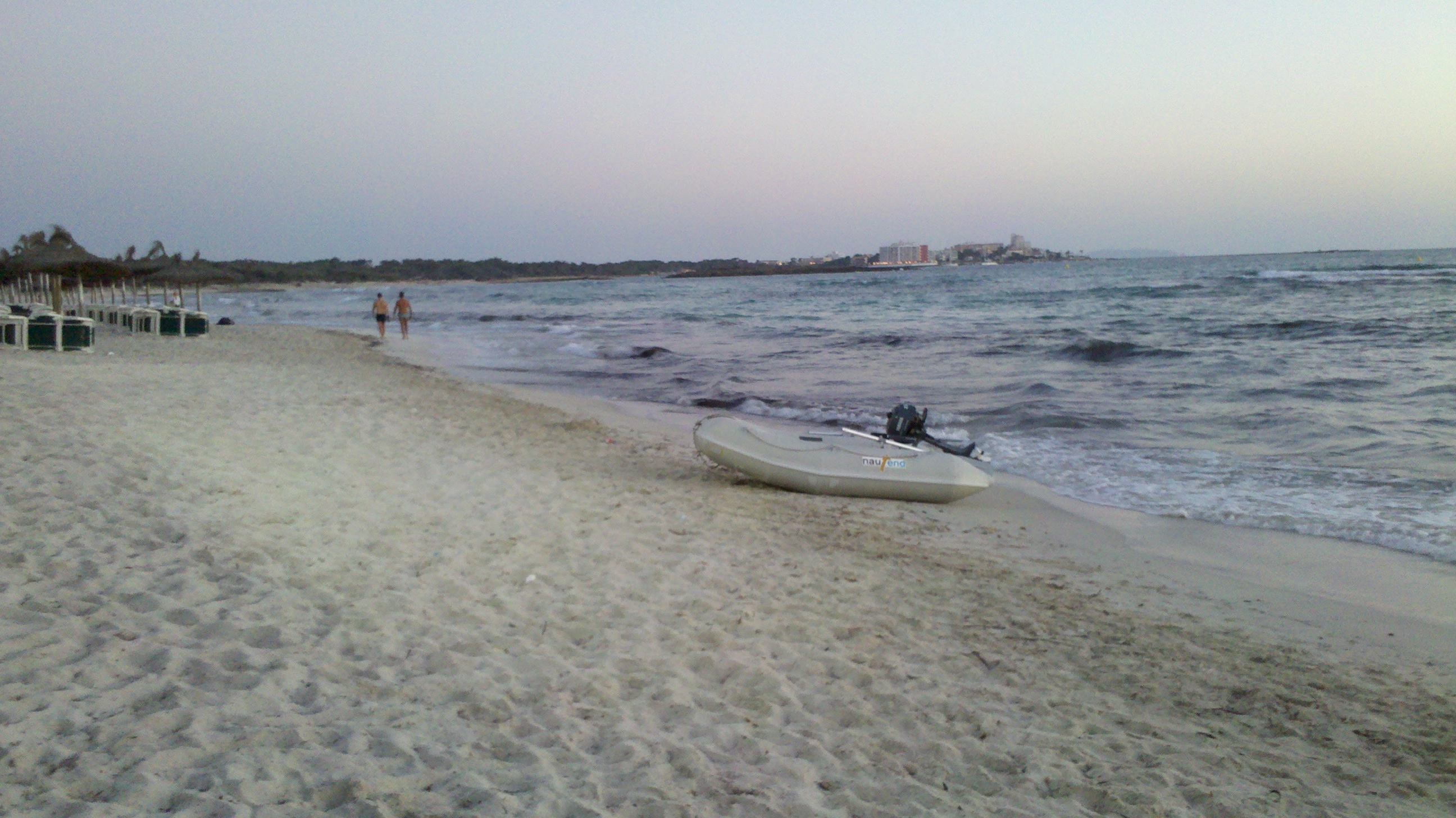
Es Trenc beach

The beach of Es Trenc close to Campos on the southern coast of Mallorca is part of the Natural Area of Special Interest Es Trenc-Salobrar de Campos. The beach is about 10 km long and extends from Sa Ràpita to Colònia de Sant Jordi. It has white sand dunes and shallow, calm water. Es Trenc is the most popular clothing-optional beach in Mallorca, and is also popular among LGBT people.

Close behind the beach, fleur de sel is harvested in the Salinas d'Es Trenc.
