= Moshio salt =

Type of Japanese sea salt

Moshio salt (藻塩) is a type of Japanese sea salt made using an ancient method where it is collected using a dried seaweed known as hondawara (Sargassum fulvellum). The seaweed is believed to confer additional umami flavor to the salt.

Japan's climate is too cool and wet to allow easy production of salt by simple evaporation of seawater. Boiling down seawater directly used a tremendous amount of fuel, so seaweed was historically the main technique used until the 7th century when enden pan salt – clay pan salt fields – became the main salt production technique.

== Process ==
To make the salt, the seaweed is dried out, and salt crystals form on the seaweed. These are collected by boiling the seaweed in seawater in bags to form a concentrated brine. The resultant solution is boiled down until it crystallizes out.
