= Anglesey Sea Zoo =

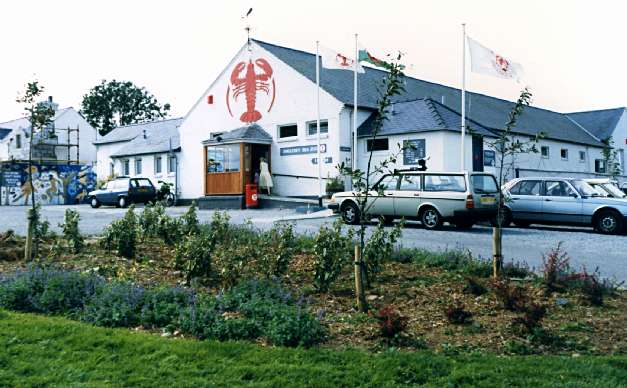
- Interactive map of Anglesey Sea Zoo
- 53.16417°N 4.27883°W
- Date opened: 1983
- Location: Near Brynsiencyn, Anglesey, Wales
- No. of species: 150
- Annual visitors: 100,000
- Website: angleseyseazoo.co.uk

The Anglesey Sea Zoo (Welsh: Sw Môr Môn) is an aquarium and independent research and marine education centre on the south coast of Anglesey island in North Wales. Located just outside the village of Brynsiencyn, Anglesey Sea Zoo claims to be the largest aquarium in Wales and displays over 150 native species.

== History ==
The Anglesey Sea Zoo was opened in 1983 by David and Alison Lea-Wilson, who later founded the next door Halen Môn sea salt business. As owners of a lobster wholesale business, they realized lobster tanks had become attractions in themselves. In 2007 the attraction was sold to research ecologists who have since gone on to develop research and conservation projects based at the aquarium, as well as several community conservation initiatives.

== Animals ==
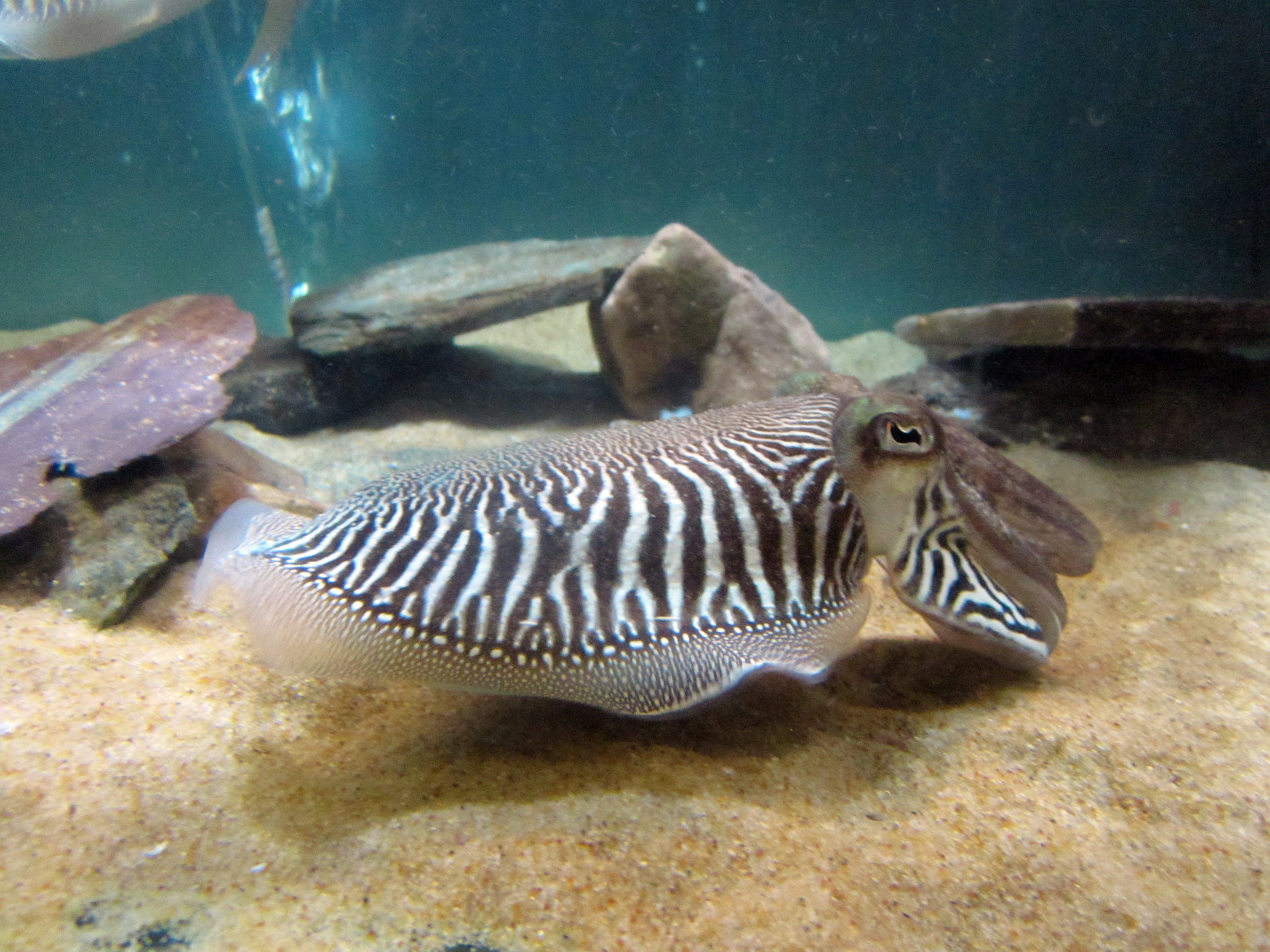
Common cuttlefish

The zoo hosts a conger eel, a shark pool, a kelp forest, and runs the Lobster Hatchery of Wales. the zoo currently has two species of sea horses—the short snouted seahorse found around the UK and Mediterranean, and the drab seahorse found in the Red Sea.

== Conservation and Animal Rescue ==
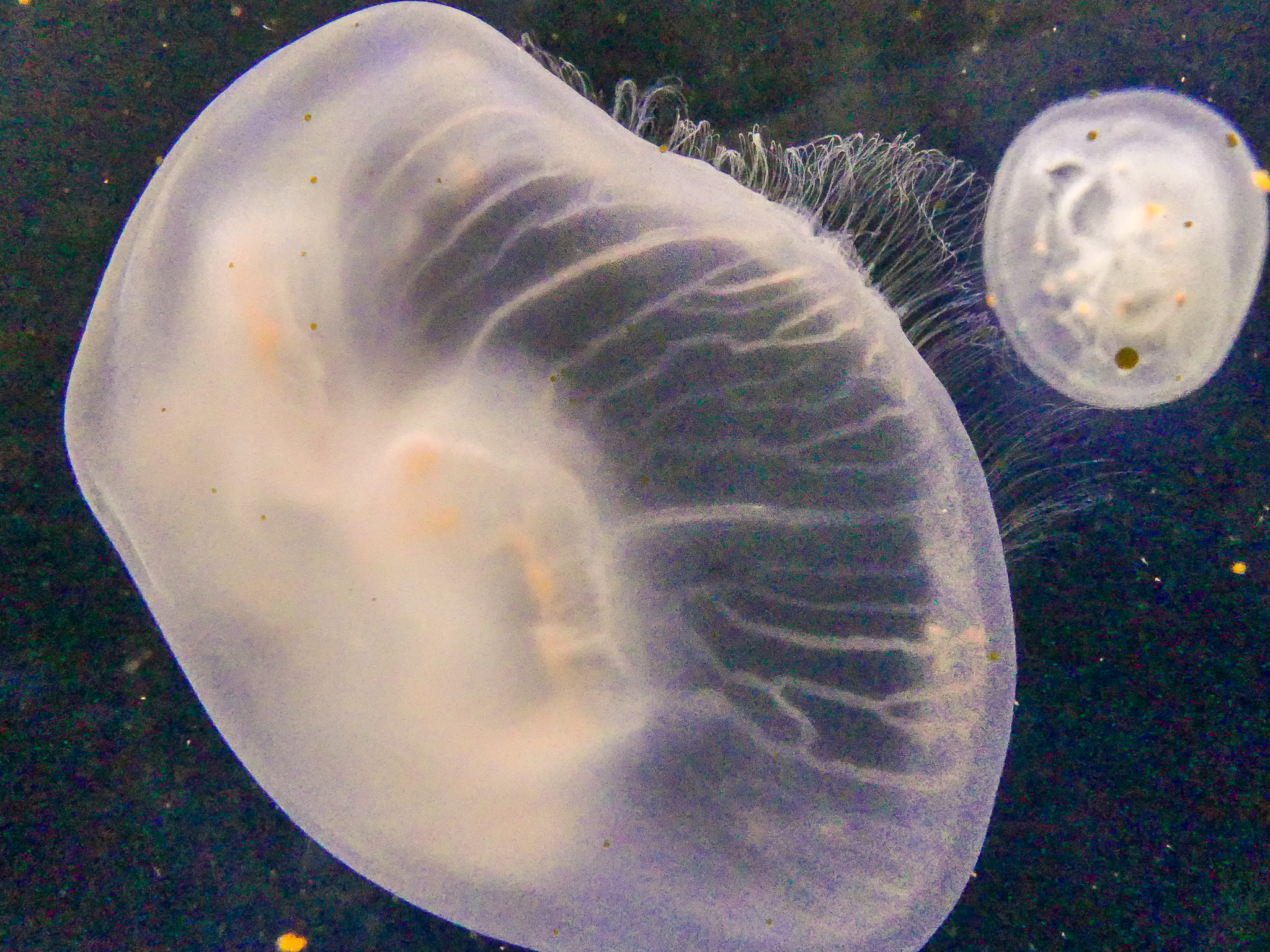
Moon jellyfish

The Anglesey Sea Zoo is a conservation zoo and tourist activity centre, involved in captive breeding programs and national and international consultancy. The zoo is one of the few places in the world that has been able to successfully breed and sustain native short-snouted seahorse. Started in 1995 when a stranded striped dolphin was successfully rescued, the zoo now contains a rescue center for sick or stranded marine animals, including dolphins, whales, porpoises, seals, turtles, and seabirds. The rescue center is part of a network being created in the British Isles by the British Divers Marine Life Rescue (BDMLR).

== Eating and shopping ==
The aquarium also houses one of the only shops and bistros that sell almost exclusively fair trade and locally sourced products. Around 85% of the food served in the bistro, although simple, comes from within 10 miles of the centre. For the 2015–16 association football season the zoo were the away shirt sponsors for Welsh Premier League side Bangor City F.C.
