= Fat (cookbook) =

Cookbook by Jennifer McLagan

Fat: An Appreciation of a Misunderstood Ingredient, with Recipes
- Book cover
- Author: Jennifer McLagan
- Genre: cookbook

Fat: An Appreciation of a Misunderstood Ingredient, with Recipes is a cookbook written by Canadian author Jennifer McLagan. In Fat, McLagan discusses the history of the shift from diets that were high in animal fat to low-fat foods, which has not resulted in an appreciable increase in overall health. The trend to lower fat foods is a result of studies conducted in the 1940s, which McLagan disputes. Included in Fat are instructions for fat rendering, recipes for its use, and a description of the health benefits of eating animal fat.

In 2009 the book received the James Beard Foundation Award and the IACP Cookbook Award.

== History ==
McLagen was raised in Australia in the 1960s, prior to the North American and United Kingdom diets moving towards low fat. In the 1970s, she moved to Europe, where fat was not being removed as a common part of the diet. The 1970s saw American diets adopting lower amounts of animal fat (though without an improvement in overall health), resulting in an increased intake of overall fat, with vegetable fats substituted for animal fats, leading to higher polyunsaturated fat levels in the diet. McLagan's explanation for the belief that fat is unhealthy comes from Ancel Keys's studies in the 1940s, which linked animal fat to heart disease—studies which have since been challenged by other studies which do not link the two. McLangan states the studies were faulty, citing the "French paradox," according to which cultures with a high-fat diet have low rates of heart disease.

== Content ==
McLagen discusses the misconception that people have about fat as a "greasy killer" and describes the shift to a low-fat diet, citing two studies that show that obesity may not be connected to heart attacks, and pointing to the Atkins diet. There are sections dedicated to butter and to types of fat from different animals, with instructions on how to render it, store it and cook with it. Recipes for dishes with animal fat as an ingredient are included as well. McLagen's book also covers the health benefits of animal fat, such as its energy content, helping the immune system, reducing LDL cholesterol, and aiding in digestion of protein and fat-soluble vitamins. McLagen contends that animal fat is not unhealthy and tastes good, but that it has gotten a bad reputation and thus consumers have become afraid of eating it—if they stopped being afraid, they would enjoy it.

== See also ==
- Salted: A Manifesto on the World's Most Essential Mineral, with Recipes
- In Defense of Food
