= Jennifer McLagan =

- Born: Australia
- Occupations: Chef, author

Jennifer McLagan is an Australian/Canadian chef and author based in Toronto. She has become famous for writing books on food and is the author of the book Fat: An Appreciation of a Misunderstood Ingredient, with Recipes.

McLagan was born in Australia. She enrolled in Monash University for a degree in politics and economics, but dropped out of college to pursue her career in the food industry. Her career in the food industry started as a chef in the Southern Cross Hotel in Melbourne. After working there for some time, she immigrated to the United Kingdom. In the UK, she worked in a London restaurant established by Prue Leith.

After her marriage with a sculptor, she moved to Toronto.
