= Cyclic salt =

Salt carried by the wind from breaking waves and deposited on land

Cyclic salt is salt that is carried by the wind when it comes in contact with breaking waves. It is estimated that more than 300 million tons of cyclic salt is deposited on the Earth's surface each year, and it is considered to be a significant factor in the chlorine content of the Earth's river water. In general, cyclic salt deposits are lower at sites further inland and are most abundant along the shoreline, although this pattern varies depending on the given environmental conditions.

Use of the term "cyclic" refers to the cycle in which the salt moves from sea to land and is then washed by rainwater back to the sea. The salt (and other solid matter) cannot evaporate as water does. Instead it leaves the ocean surface in fine droplets of drop impacts or bubble bursts. Wave-crests and other turbulence form foam. When drops splash or bubbles burst, fine droplets of solute are ejected from the water or bubble surface into the air. Some of the droplets are small enough to allow the water to evaporate before it falls back into the sea, leaving in the air a mote of the solid residue light enough to stay suspended by Brownian motion and be carried away on the wind.

== See also ==
- Edible salt
- Sodium chloride
