= River reed salt =

Salt extracted from river reeds in Kenya

- Place of origin: Kenya
- Region or state: Nabuyole
- Invented: 17th century
- Main ingredients: Muchua reed
- Similar dishes: Culinary ash

River reed salt is a type of salt produced in Kenya from river reeds called muchua that grow along the Nzoia River. It is thought that the origins of this practice date back to the 17th century, when the Bukusu people migrated from the area of the Congo River.

The only place the salt is traditionally made is the village of Nabuyole in Webuye Constituency of Bungoma County. To produce the salt, muchua reeds growing along the river are collected, dried, and then burnt to first obtain the ash. The collected ash is then placed in a vessel with drainage. Water is slowly passed over and collected in a vessel underneath. The solution is filtered and then boiled to obtain the salt crystals which are traditionally packaged in banana leaves.
