= Bamboo salt =

Korean salt roasted in bamboo

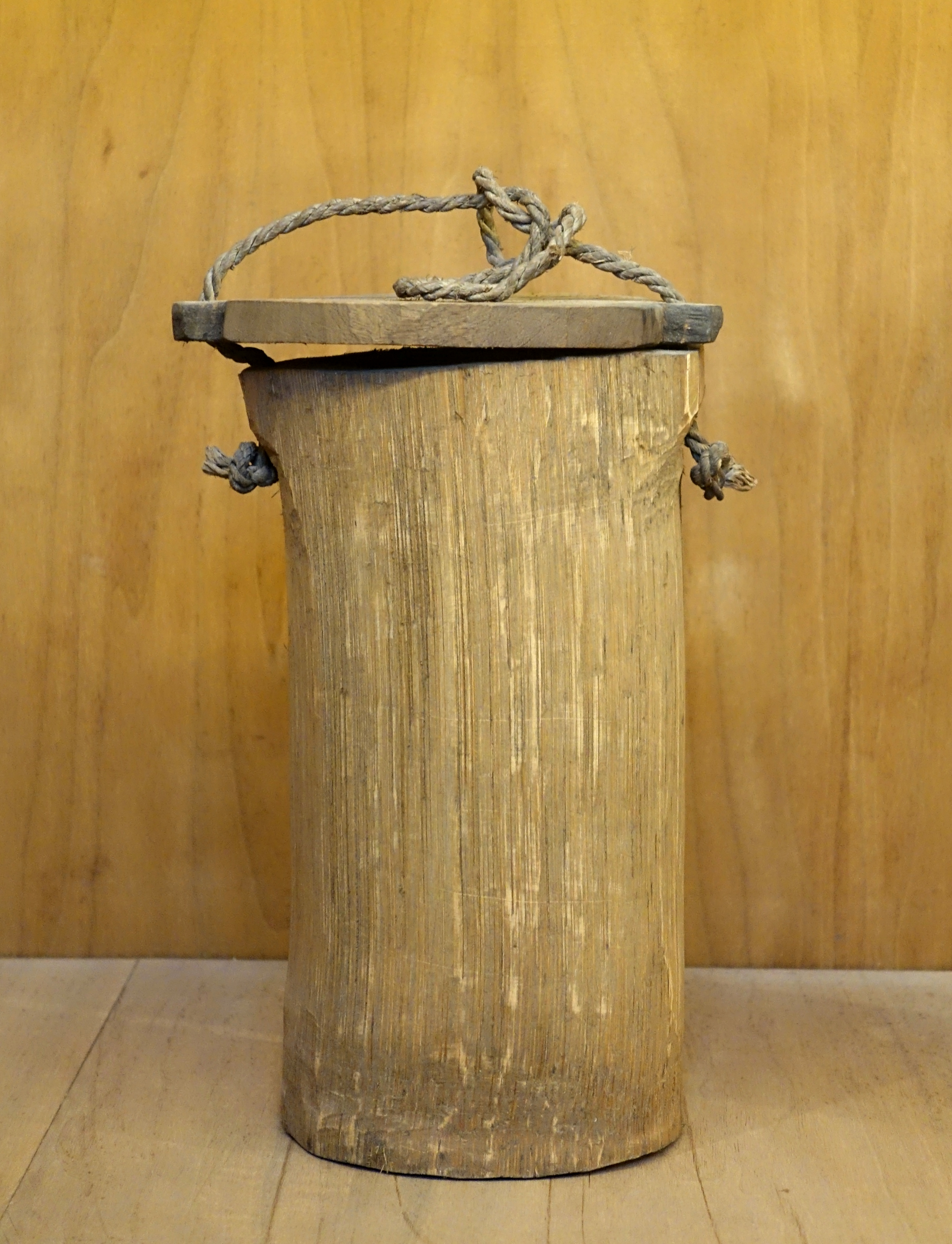
- A bamboo salt container from Vietnam.

Korean name
- Hangul: 죽염
- Hanja: 竹鹽
- RR: jugyeom
- MR: chugyŏm
- IPA: [tɕu.ɡjʌm]

Bamboo salt (Jugyeom, Korean: 죽염) is a Korean condiment and traditional remedy. It is prepared by packing sea salt in a thick bamboo stem, and baking it nine times at high temperature using pine firewood.

== Production ==
To make jugyeom, sea salt is packed into bamboo canisters and sealed with yellow clay. Traditionally, the mixture is baked in an iron oven and roasted in a pine fire at about 800°C (or 1472°F) which burns away the bamboo, leaving a column of salt. This process takes around 12 to 14 hours. These columns are then taken out, ground, and repacked in bamboo canisters. This process is repeated eight more times.

The salt filled in these bamboo canisters is bay salt produced from Korea's west coast. During baking, the salt absorbs the bamboo constituents that bring a distinctive sweetness, which is called Gamrojung flavor. Baking darkens the salt. The ninth baking process uses the highest temperature, over 1,000 °C (1,830 °F) in a special kiln. This high temperature completely melts the salt, which is drained into a mould. Then it is allowed to cool down for a few days; a blackened rock like structure remains which is carefully broken down. Afterwards, the bamboo salt contains blue, yellow, red, white and black crystals.

Well-baked bamboo salt, with a temperature above 1,500 °C (2,730 °F), is called "purple bamboo salt" because of its unique purple color, which indicates the best quality. While the quality of bamboo salt cannot be solely determined by color, its crystal structure and hardiness is definitive.

For centuries, bamboo salt was baked about two to three times that was used in traditional Korean medicine. But in the 20th century, the above mentioned nine-times-roasting process was developed. The manufacturers say this process has the lowest toxicity and highest mineral content. Today, it is used for cooking, toothpaste, soap, and various remedies.

== Korean folk medicine ==
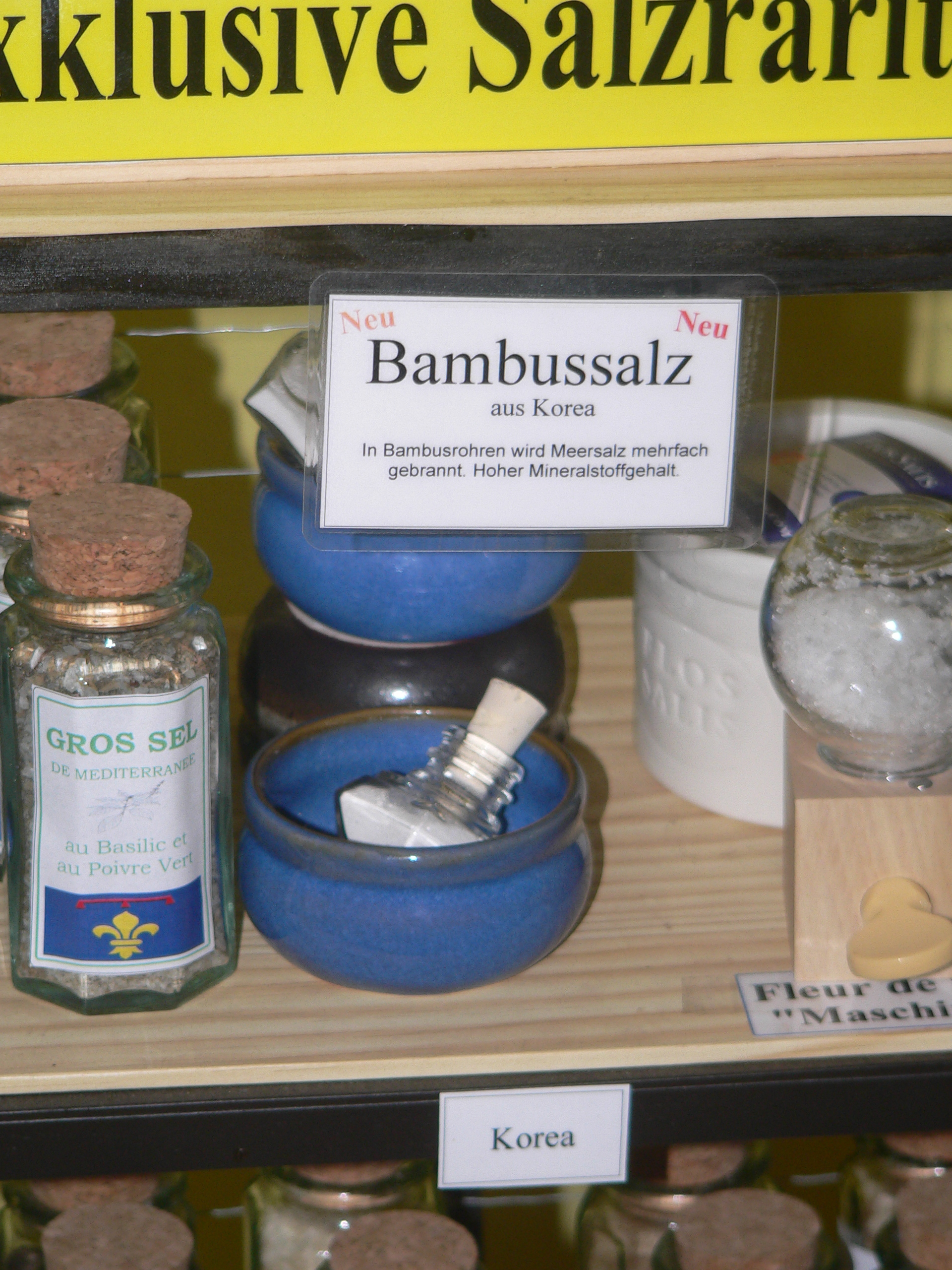
A capsule of jugyeom, sold in a foreign imports store in Germany

In Korean folk medicine, trace elements in the yellow clay and bamboo are thought to make this form of salt more healthy. Historically, jugyeom has been used as a digestive aid, styptic, disinfectant or dentifrice.

== Chemical composition ==
Bamboo salt is mostly sodium chloride (NaCl) ranging from 85% to 98% based on the making process. Magnesium and sulphur are the next two major component standing at ~2% and ~1% respectively, with trace amounts of other elements like potassium, calcium, silicon, aluminium, phosphorus, bromine, and iron.
