= Salt Mines of Maras =

Salt flat in Peru

- Salt pan
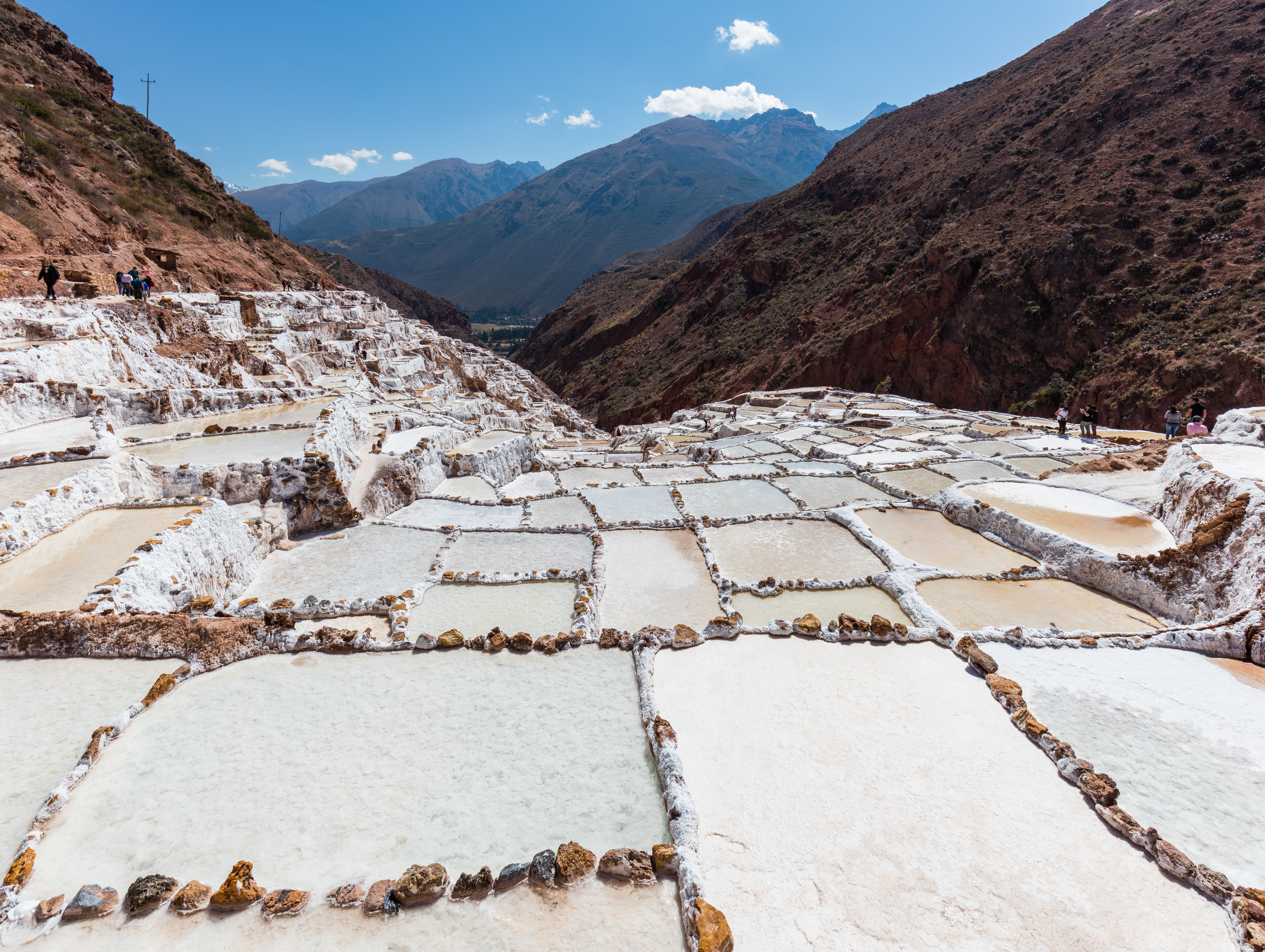
- Salineras (salt evaporation ponds) in Maras, Peru

- Location within Peru
- Coordinates: 13°18′01″S 72°09′20″W
- Location: Urubamba Province, Cusco Region

Area
  - Total: 2 hectares (0.020 km^{2})
- Elevation: 3,200 m (10,500 ft)

Cultural Heritage of Peru
- Official name: Zona Arqueológica Monumental de Salineras – Maras
- Type: Immovable tangible
- Criteria: Monumental Archaeological Zone
- Designated: 27 November 1998; 27 years ago
- Legal basis: R.D.N. 604/INC-1998

The Salt Mines of Maras (Spanish: Salineras de Maras) is one of the largest salt extraction centers of prehispanic origin in Cusco. It is in the Urubamba Province in Cusco in southeast Peru, at an elevation of 3,200 m (10,500 ft) above sea level.

== Overview ==
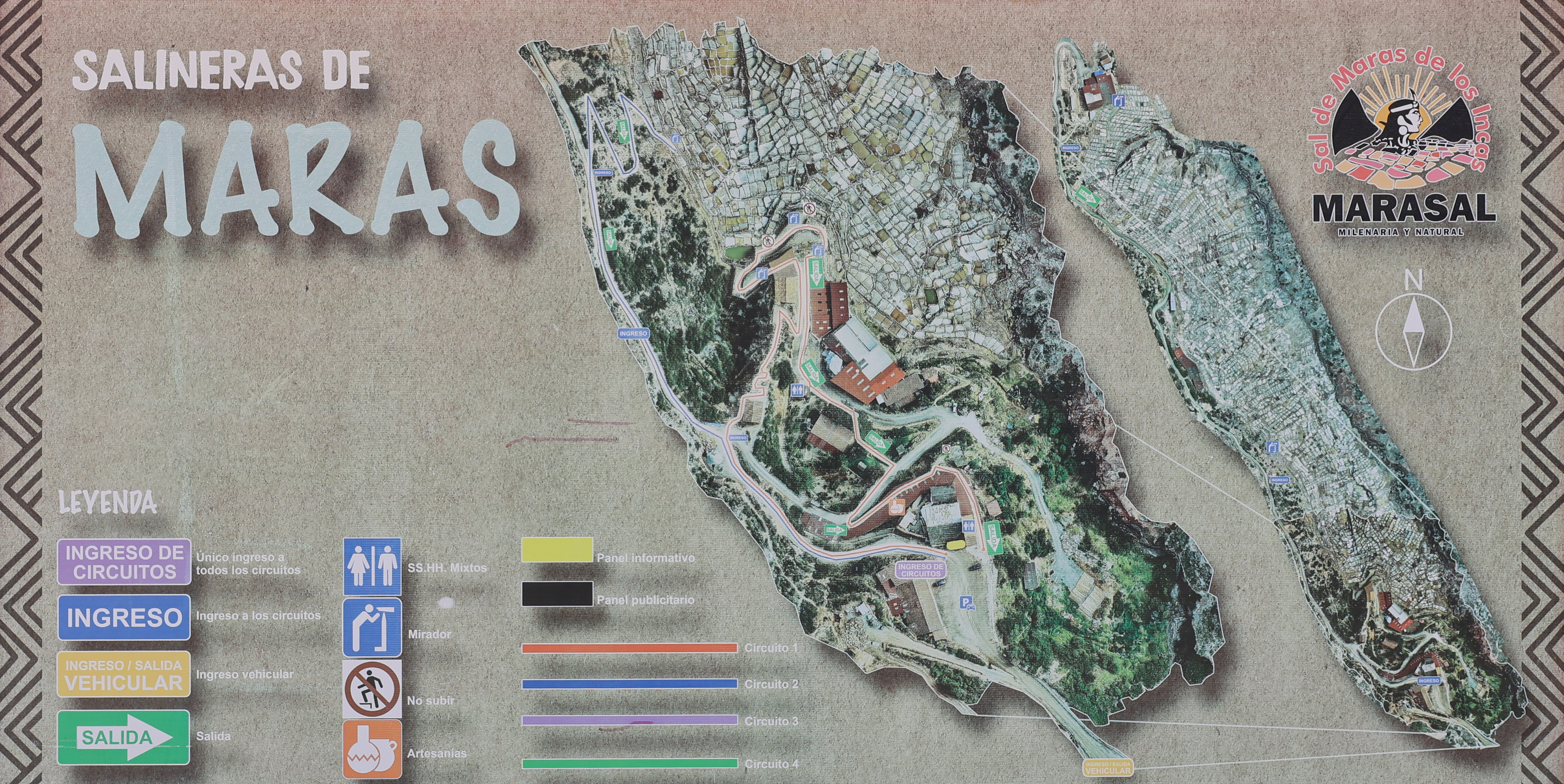
Plan of the salt mines

The Salt Mines have a long history dating back to the Early Horizon period, with continued use throughout pre-Hispanic times and subsequent periods, including the Inca, Colonial, Republican, and Contemporary eras.

Archaeological research in the Pakallamoqo sector has uncovered artifacts such as Chanapata ceramics dating from the Early Intermediate Period. Excavations in the Maras area have revealed archaeological sites with fragments of ceramics from various periods, including Chanapata (700 B.C.), Killke (1000 A.D.), and Inca styles.

In the 16th century, prominent figures like Don Felipe Topa Yupangui and Don Alonso Titu Atauchi, descendants of the Inca nobility, were recorded as owners of salt mines in Maras. The Royal Decree of November 1, 1591, initiated land assessments overseen by colonial authorities, documenting ownership and distribution of salt mines among different families and communities. During the 16th and 17th centuries, control over the salt mines remained with descendants of the Inca. However, in the 19th century, ownership shifted to private individuals, leading to disputes over access and control.

In 1969, the Peruvian state assumed control of salt extraction and commercialization, but in 1980, local communities regained control with the establishment of Marasal S.A., owned by residents of Maras and Pichingoto. Today, the company manages salt administration and commercialization, with around 400 families owning salt wells in the area.

In 2019, the Peruvian government nominated the mines to become a UNESCO World Heritage Site.

== Construction and layout ==
Approximately 4,500 salt wells sit in a staggered arrangement along the mountain slope. They are constructed with retaining walls of irregular stone and clay; each well measures approximately five square meters in area and thirty centimeters deep. At the top of the slope, a saline spring feeds into a main irrigation channel, which then branches out into a series of smaller channels to supply the wells.

== Salt mining ==
Salt mining takes place once a month. The process of producing salt involves letting the wells fill with saltwater from the spring to a depth of five centimeters, then evaporating the water for three days. This cycle is repeated for a month, at which point the salt is several inches deep. The salt is then broken down through manual force or pickaxes, taken out of the wells in small chunks, and allowed to dry, before being taken to Marasal's warehouse to prepare it commercially.

Salt extraction is done in layers, with each layer sold for a different purpose. The first (top) layer is intended to be kitchen salt; the second, bulk salt, and the third layer for industrial or agricultural uses. While done year-round, the mines produce the best-quality salt during Peru's dry season (May to October): the salt accumulates much faster in the wells and has a pink or white color. During the wet season (November to April), accumulation is slower and the salt is often brown in color.

Ownership of the salt ponds is kept within families and passed down across generations; if someone wants to sell their pond, it must be to another resident of the nearby villages of Maras or Pichingoto.

== Tourism ==
The salt mines are a popular tourist attraction in the Cusco region, with over 1,500 tourists visiting daily during the high season.

== Gallery ==
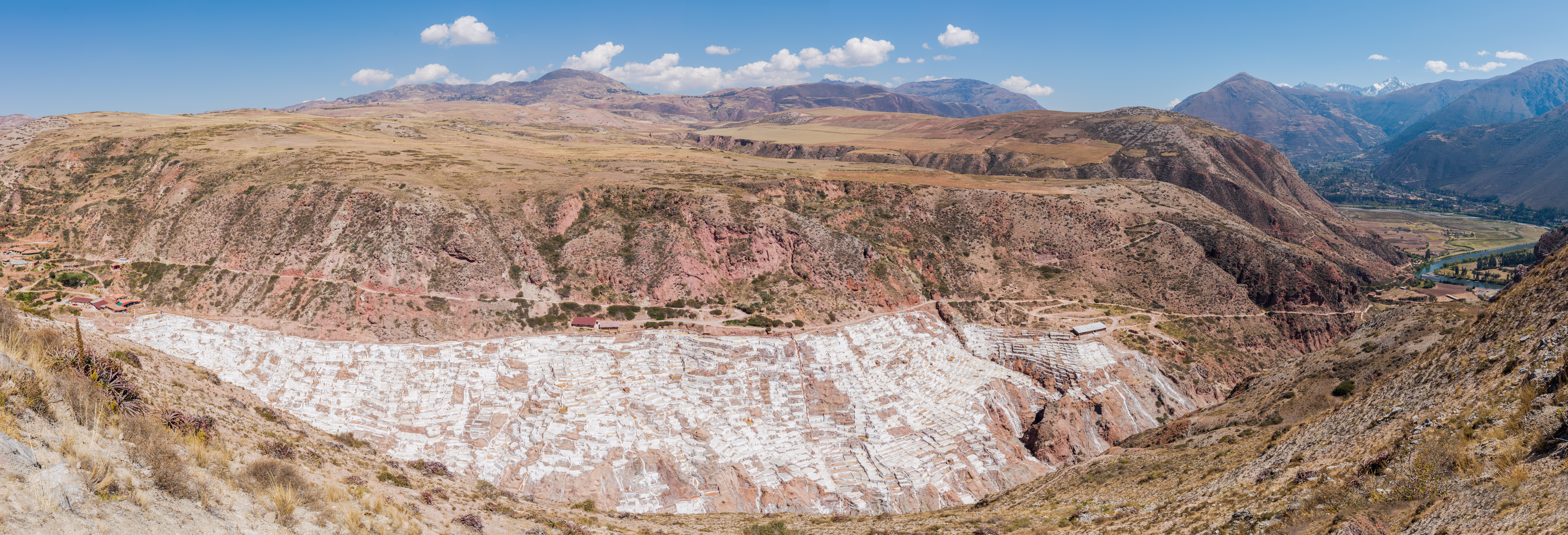
Panoramic view of the mines

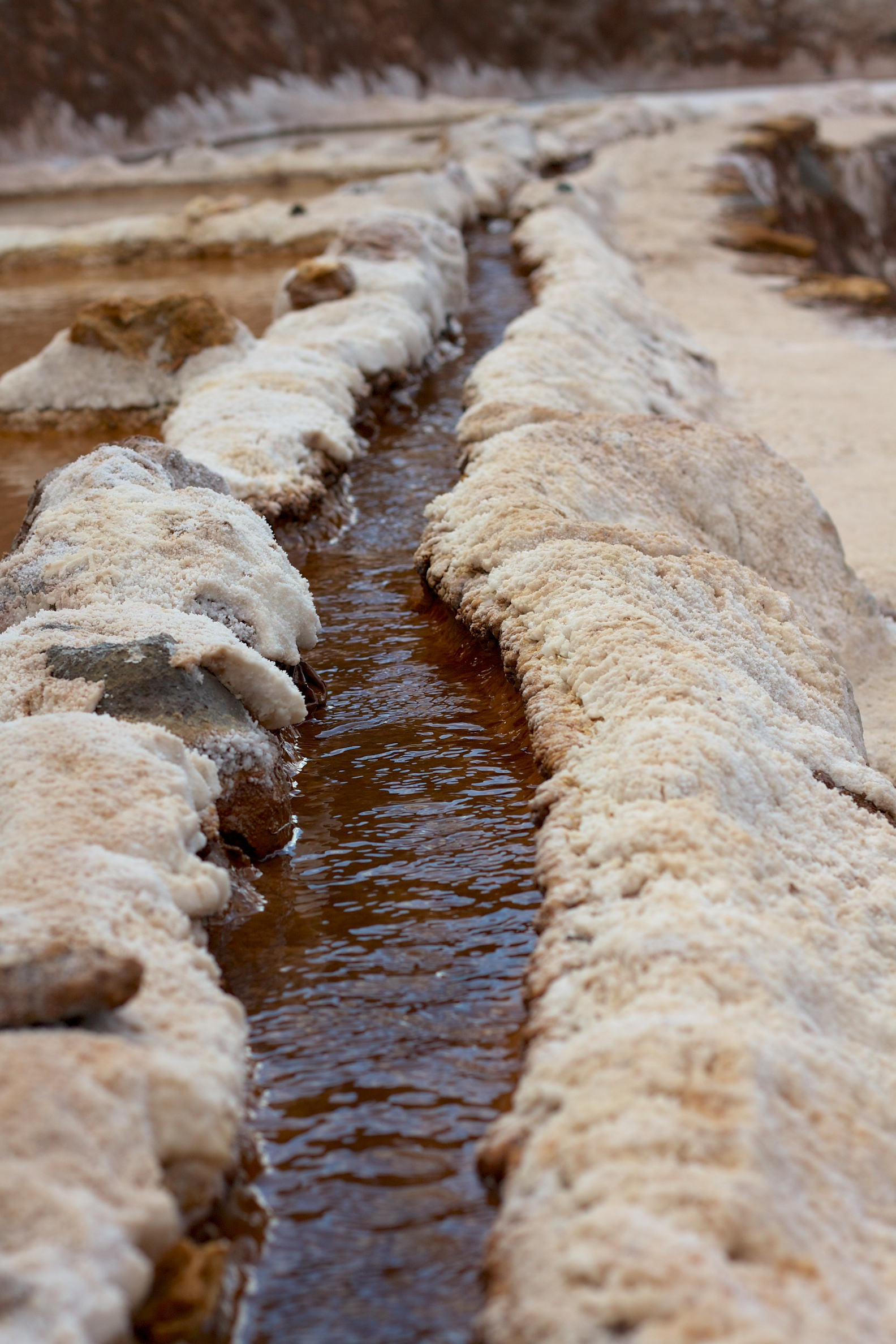
A saltwater channel through the wells

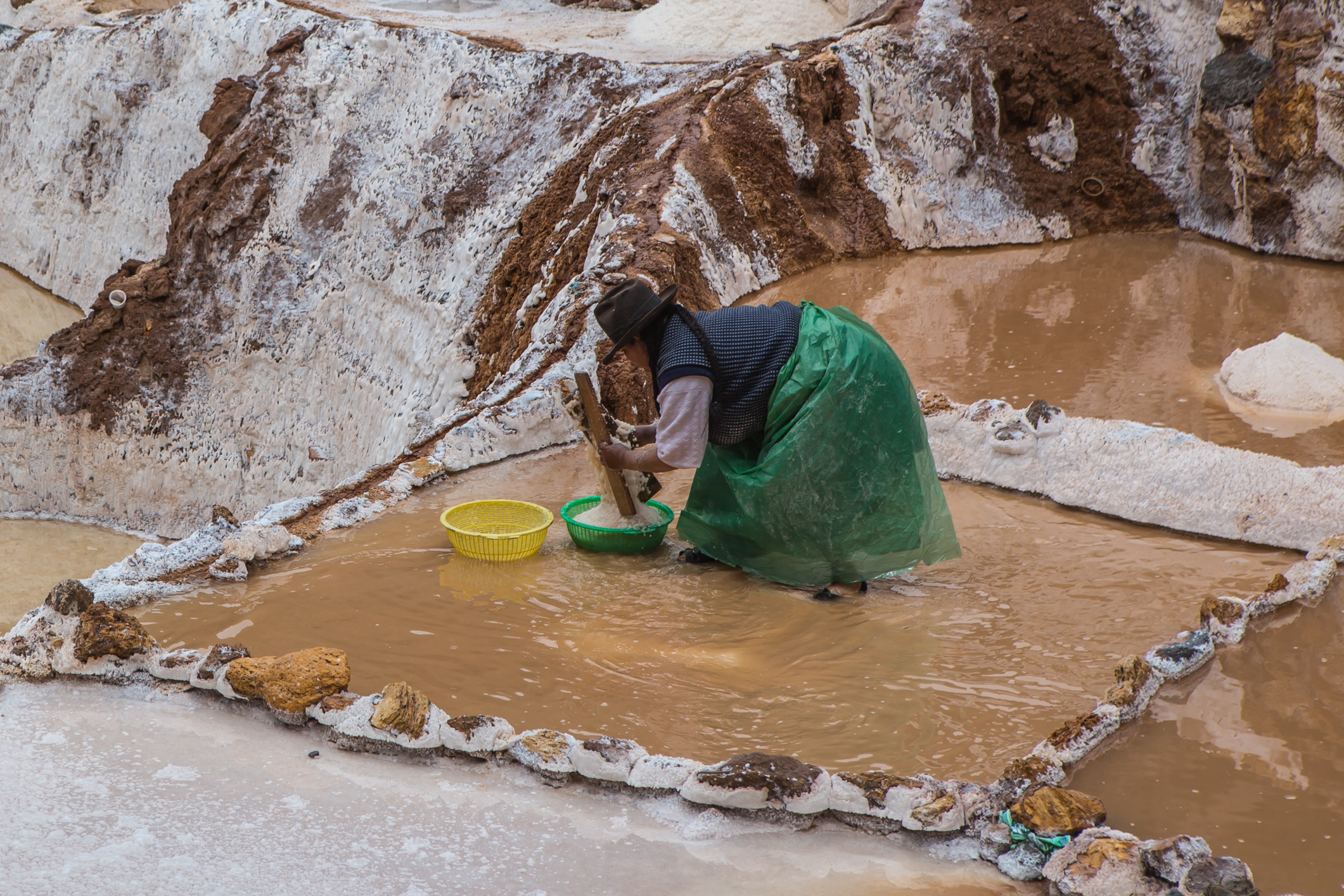
A woman straining salt through a sieve

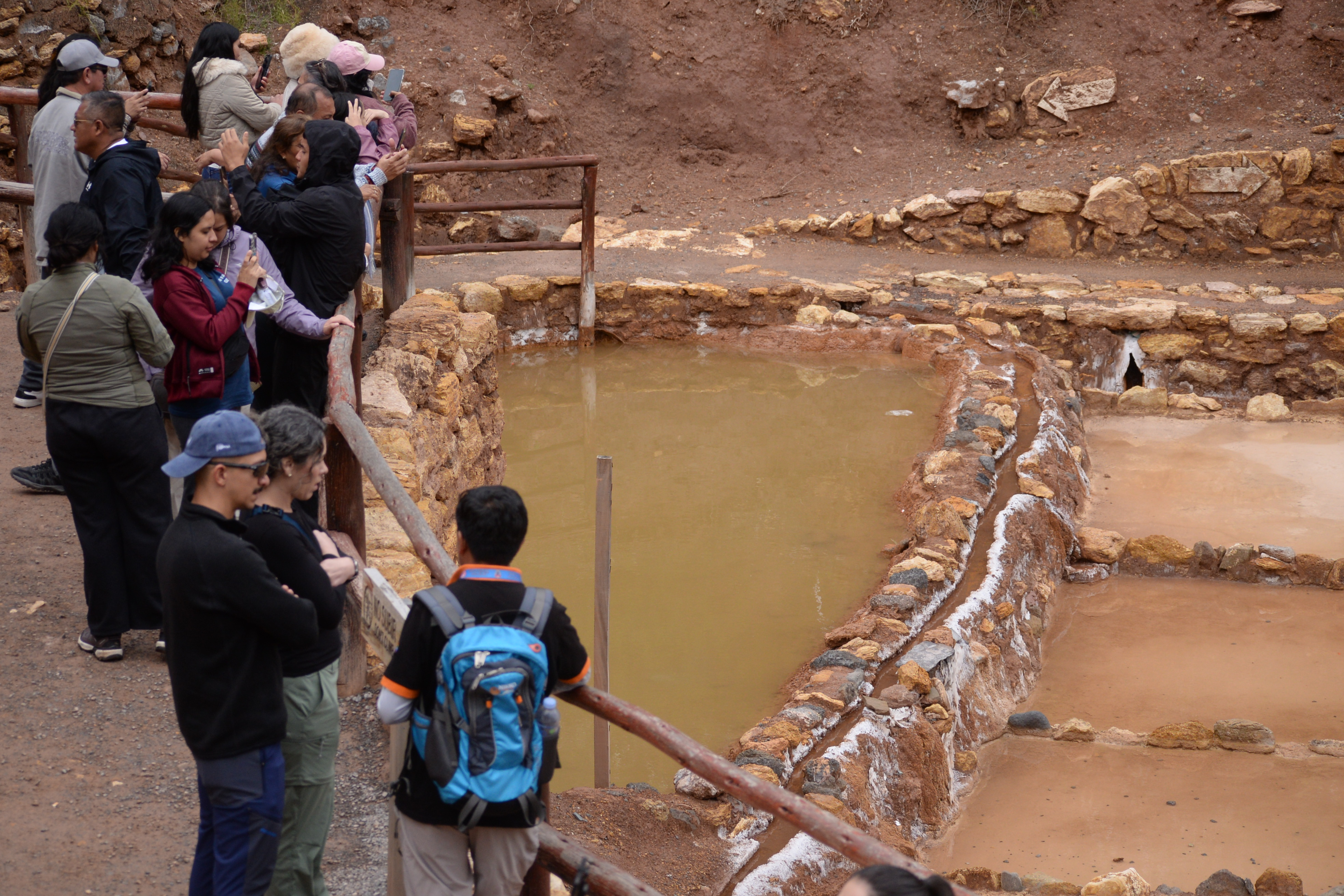
Tourists at the salt mines

Wells encrusted with salt
