= Fleur de sel =

Type of sea salt, used as a garnish

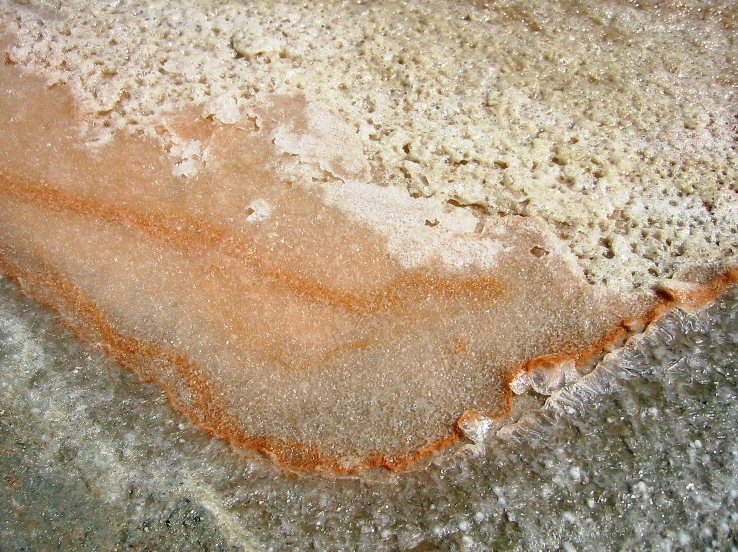
Fleur de sel

Fleur de sel ("flower of salt" in French; French pronunciation: [flœʁ də sɛl]) or flor de sal (in Portuguese, Spanish and Catalan) is a salt that forms as a thin, delicate crust on the surface of seawater as it evaporates. Fleur de sel has been collected since ancient times (it was mentioned by Pliny the Elder in his book Natural History), and was traditionally used as a purgative and salve. It is now used as a finishing salt to flavor and garnish food. The origin of the name is uncertain, but is perfectly in line with both meanings of fleur: flower, and the surface of something. The salt crust forms flower-like patterns of crystals which may contribute to the name.

Fleur de sel is a highly sought-after salt, used globally in high-end kitchens due to its long-lasting flavor. Properly harvested fleur de sel costs hundreds of times more than table salt due to the difficult-to-master harvesting technique and high demand globally.

== Harvesting ==
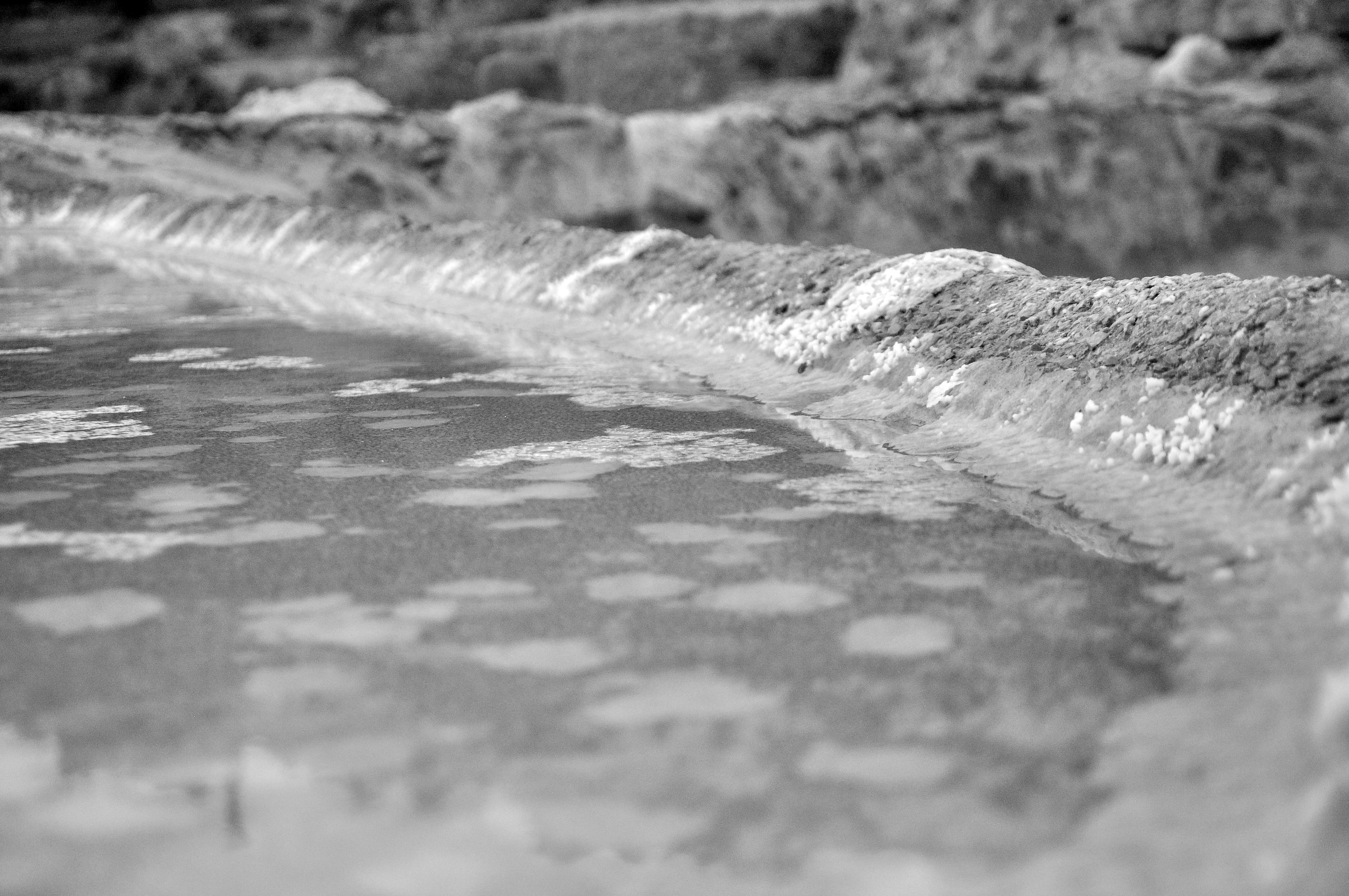
Formation of fleur de sel in Feraoun (Algeria)

One method of gathering sea salt is to draw seawater into marsh basins or salt pans and allow the water to evaporate, leaving behind the salt that was dissolved in it. As the water evaporates, most of the salt precipitates out on the bottom of the marsh or pan (and is later collected as ordinary sea salt), but some salt crystals float on the surface of the water, forming a delicate crust of intricate pyramidal crystals. This is fleur de sel. The delicacy requires that it be harvested by hand, so this is done with traditional methods using traditional tools. In France, the workers who collect salt are called paludiers, and to collect fleur de sel they employ a wooden rake called a lousse à fleur to gently rake it from the water. In Portugal, a butterfly-shaped sieve called a borboleta is used instead. It is then put in special boxes so that it will dry in the sun, and to avoid disturbing the flakes as it is transported for packaging. Historically, the workers who harvested fleur de sel were women, because it was believed that the salt crystals were so delicate, they needed to be collected by "the more delicate sex." Because it is scraped from the salt marsh like cream from milk, fleur de sel has been called "the cream of the salt pans." It is also called "the caviar of sea salts."

Fleur de sel can be collected only when it is very sunny, dry, and with slow, steady winds. Because of the nature of its formation, fleur de sel is produced in small quantities. At Guérande, France, each salt marsh produces only about one kilogram (2.2 pounds) per day. Because of this and the labor-intensive way in which it is harvested, fleur de sel is the most expensive of salts.

This method of salt formation and collection results in salt crystals that are not uniform. The salt also has a much higher amount of moisture than common salt (up to 10% compare to 0.5% for common salt), allowing the crystals to stick together in snowflake-like forms. Other minerals, like calcium and magnesium chloride, give it a more complex flavor. These chemicals make fleur de sel taste even saltier than salt, and give it what has been described as the flavor of the sea. Trace mineral content depends upon the location at which it is harvested, so the flavor varies with point of origin.

Fleur de sel is rarely the pure white of table salt. It is often pale gray or off-white from clay from the salt marsh beds. Sometimes it has a faintly pink tinge from the presence of Dunaliella salina, a type of pink microalga commonly found in salt marshes. However, fleur de sel from Ria Formosa in Portugal is white.

== Uses ==
Only about 5% of salt is used for cooking, but fleur de sel is mostly used to flavor food. It is not commonly used in place of salt during the cooking process; instead, it is added just before serving, like a garnish, a "finishing salt," to boost the flavor of eggs, fish, meat, vegetables, chocolate, and caramel.

== Sources ==
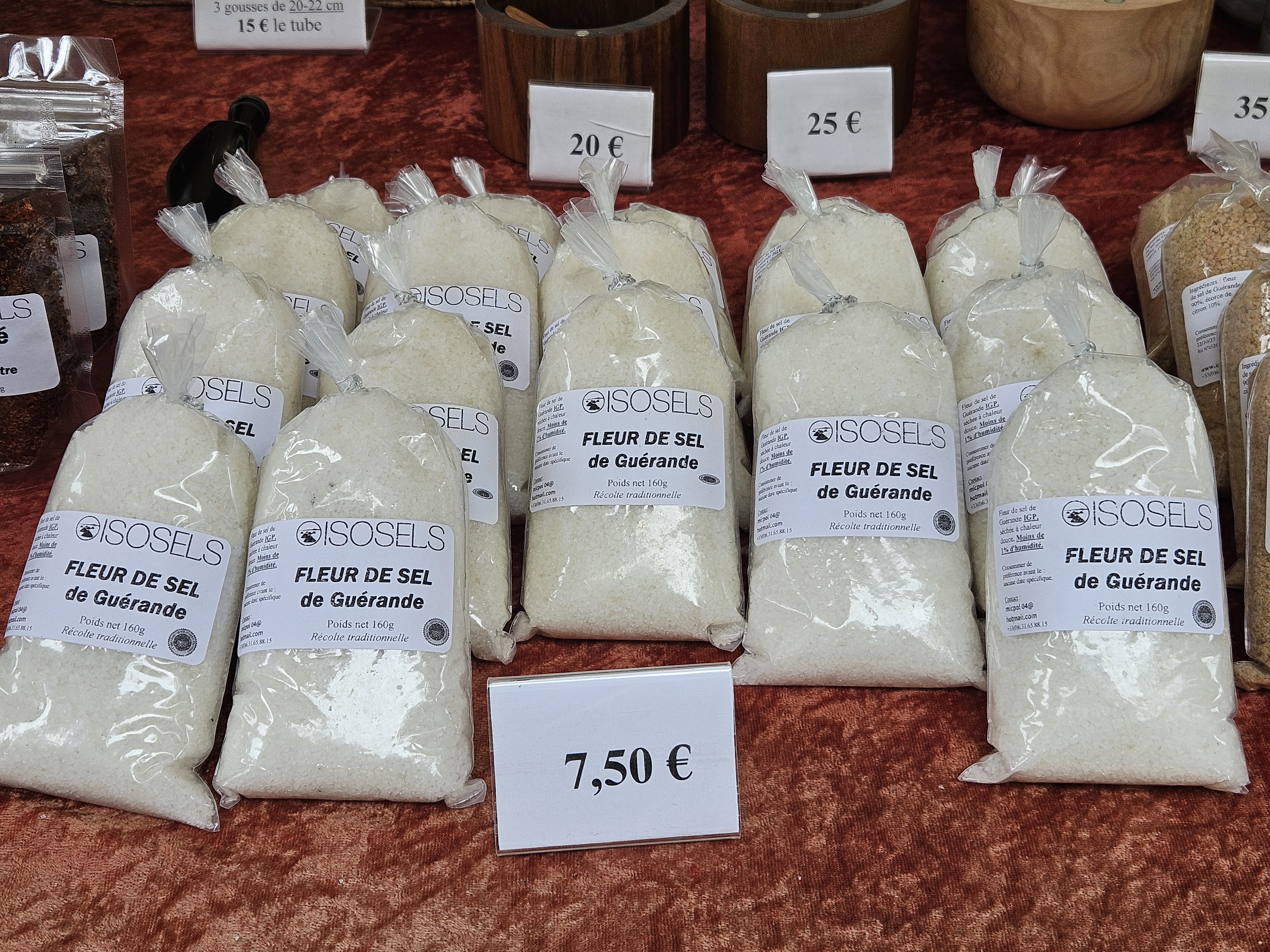
Packaged Fleur de Sel de Guérande (hand-harvested sea salt) offered for sale at the Marché Bastille open-air market in Paris, France

Sea salt has been gathered around the world for millennia, but over the last thousand years, fleur de sel was harvested only in France. Elsewhere it was collected and discarded. As the market for specialty salts has grown, companies have begun to harvest fleur de sel for export wherever the geographic and meteorological conditions are favorable.

=== Europe ===
Traditional French fleur de sel is collected off the coast of Brittany, most notably in the town of Guérande (called Fleur de Sel de Guérande), but also in Noirmoutier and Île de Ré.

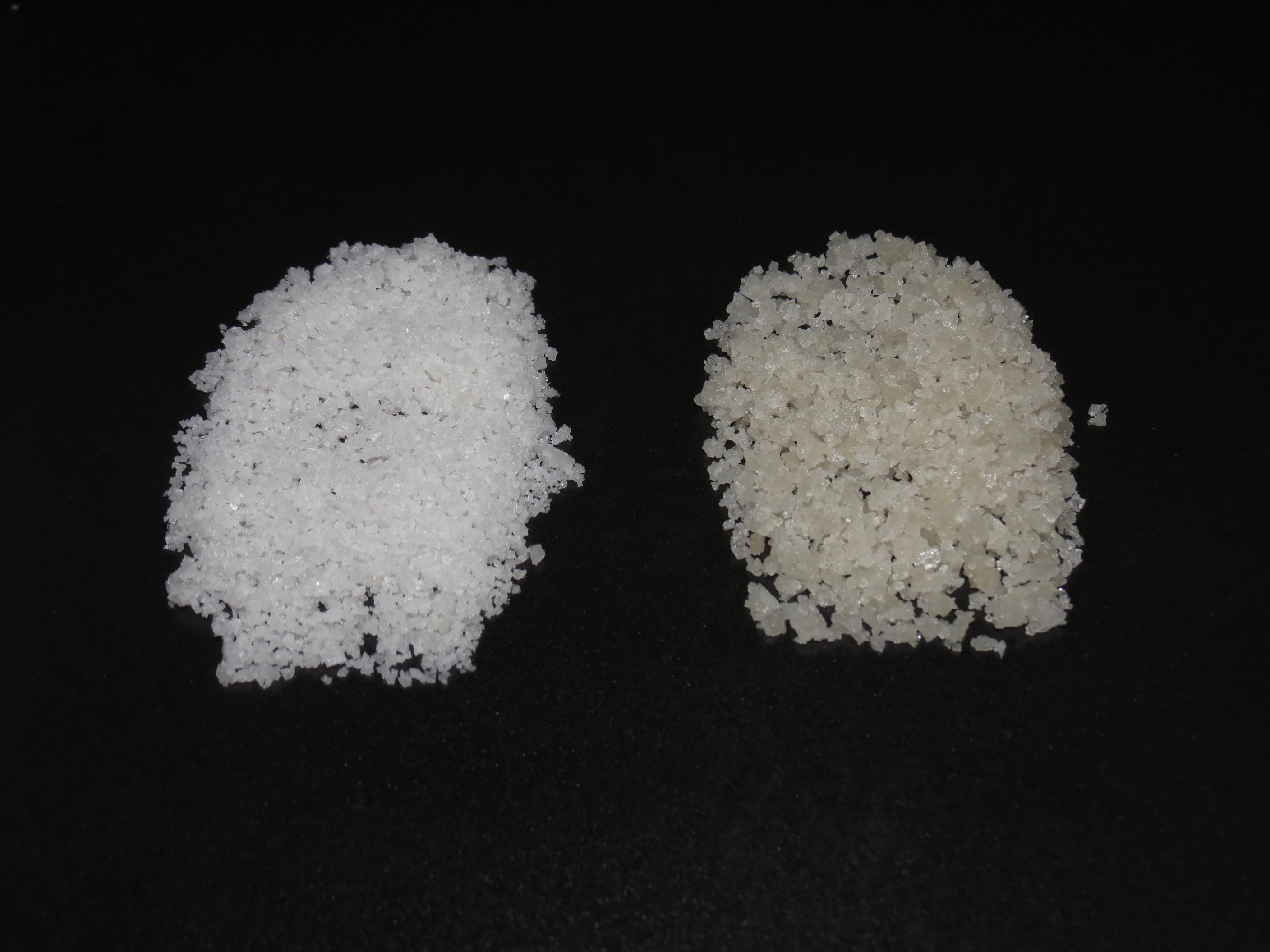
Difference between fleur de sel (left) and coarse salt (right) from the salterns of Guérande

Greeks have harvested sea salt and fleur de sel (ανθος αλατιού) along the Mediterranean Sea coast, particularly the Mani Peninsula of Lakonia and Missolonghi, from ancient times.

Flor de sal is harvested in Portugal, mostly in the Aveiro District and in the Algarve, but also in the salt marshes of Castro Marim, at the mouth of the Guadiana River that forms the border to Spain. Roman ruins near Ria Formosa specifically suggest that there has been a long history of sea salt production here. Before the invention of salt mining, Portugal's sea salt production helped to solidify its place as a world power. However, when mechanical salt mining made salt inexpensive, demand for Portugal's sea salt dropped due to its expense. For centuries flor de sal was scraped away and either discarded or given to workers, as its presence disturbed the evaporation that was creating the sea salt underneath. The process of harvesting flor de sal for sale was reintroduced in 1997 by Necton, with a grant to develop ways to capitalize Portugal's natural resources. Necton's flor de sal is whiter than the fleur de sel from Guérande, and is said to have the more robust flavor of the Atlantic as opposed to Guérande's milder Biscay Bay flavor. Due to Portugal's laws regarding the grading of salt, Necton's flor de sal is exported to France and marketed by companies who also market fleur de sel.

Spain also produces high quality flor de sal in the Ebro Delta on the mainland and the Salinas d'Es Trenc on the island of Mallorca and in the Salinas de la Trinidad in the Ebro Delta. Mallorca has a long history of salt production, dating to the Phoenicians and the Romans, but flor de sel was mostly kept for local use until Katja Wöhr arrived from Switzerland in 2002 and convinced local officials to allow her to harvest it in Es Trenc. She worked with British chef Marc Fosh to develop mixtures of flor de sal with herbs and spice blends added, such as orange, lemon, black olive, lavender, rosemary, dried rose petals, curry spices, and beetroot.

Spain's Canary Islands are also a source of flor de sal. Saltworks have operated on La Palma and Lanzarote for centuries, but the flor de sal that resulted was kept for the use of the workers until 2007, when the salt gained gourmet status. The culinary rediscovery of fleur de sel and other gourmet salts has saved small-scale artisanal saltworks in the Canaries, which were in rapid decline.

Flower of salt is also produced in Croatia, where the harvesting of salt and flower of salt dates to ancient times, thanks to relatively high salinity (3.5 B°; 1 m^{3} of seawater contains approximately 30 kg of sea salt) of seawater and favourable climate on the eastern coast of the Adriatic sea. Today, the largest producer of sea salt in Croatia is Solana Pag on the island Pag.

=== Americas ===
Mexico has produced both sea salt and flor de sal since Aztec times from the Lagoon of Cuyutlán on the Pacific Coast. There is a museum in Cuyutlán dedicated to the history and technique of flor de sal production.

Flor de sal is also harvested along the beaches of Celestun in Yucatán, Mexico, where Mayans cultivated salt 1,500 years ago for its distribution throughout Mesoamerican trade routes extending to Guatemala, Central America and the Caribbean.

Brazil started producing flor de sal in 2008 in the traditional salt-producing area of Macau in the state of Rio Grande do Norte. The salt kept for use in Brazil is iodized, as required by the Brazilian law for all salt intended for human consumption, but that intended for export is not. The main producer is ArtSal - Flor De Sal.

== Mineral composition ==
Because it is harvested naturally from the sea and is usually not refined, fleur de sel has more mineral complexity than common table salt. The following is a chemical analysis of Flos Salis, a flor de sal by Portuguese company Marisol:

| Mineral | Quantity |
|---|---|
| Sodium chloride | 97% (in dry matter) |
| Moisture | 6.5% |
| Calcium | 0.1% |
| Magnesium | 0.4% |
| Potassium | 0.2% |
| Iron | 5 mg/kg |
| Insolubles | < 0.02% |

== See also ==
- List of edible salts
