= Sea salt =

Salt produced from the evaporation of seawater

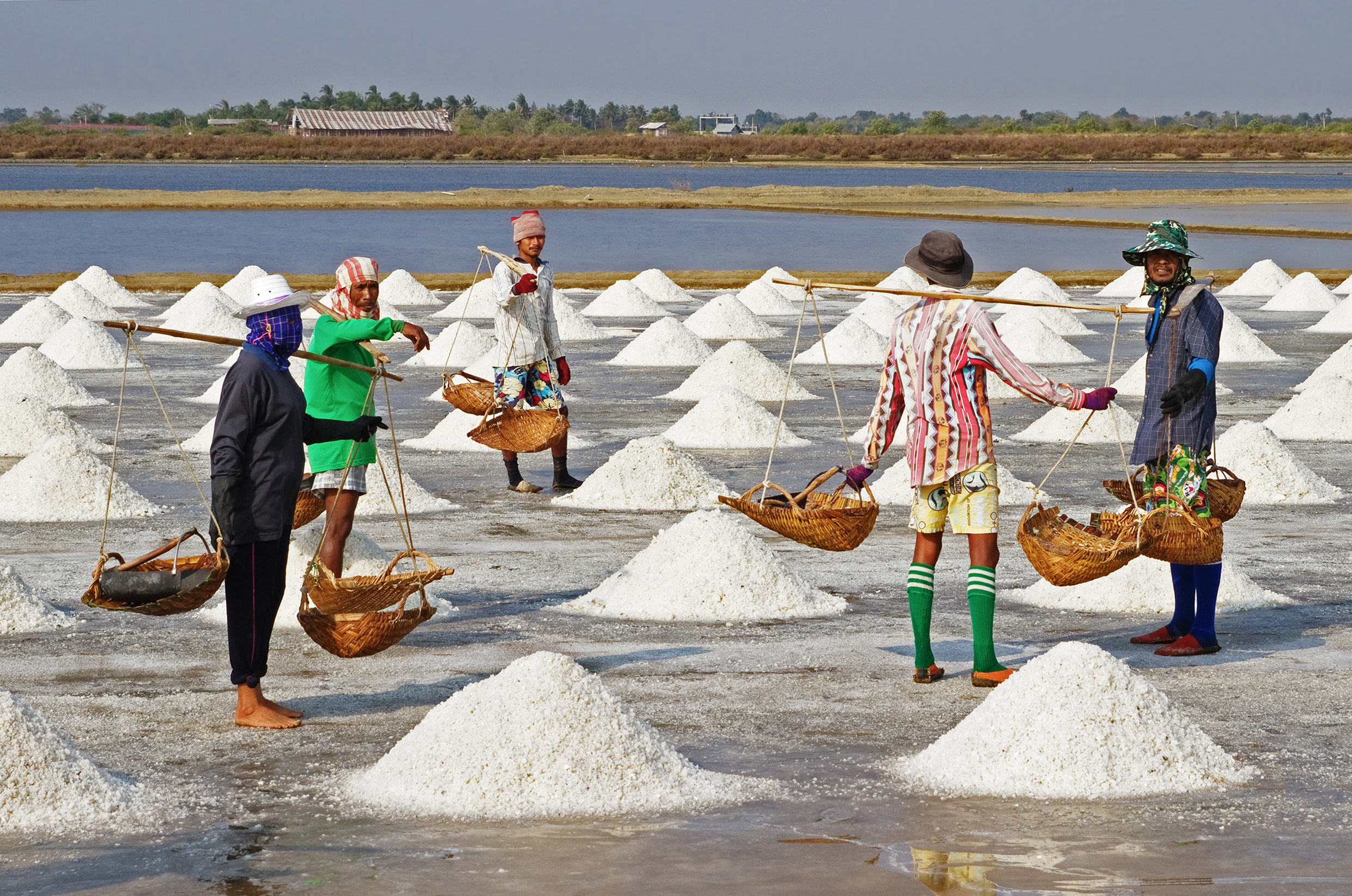
Sea salt harvesting in Pak Thale, Phetchaburi, Thailand

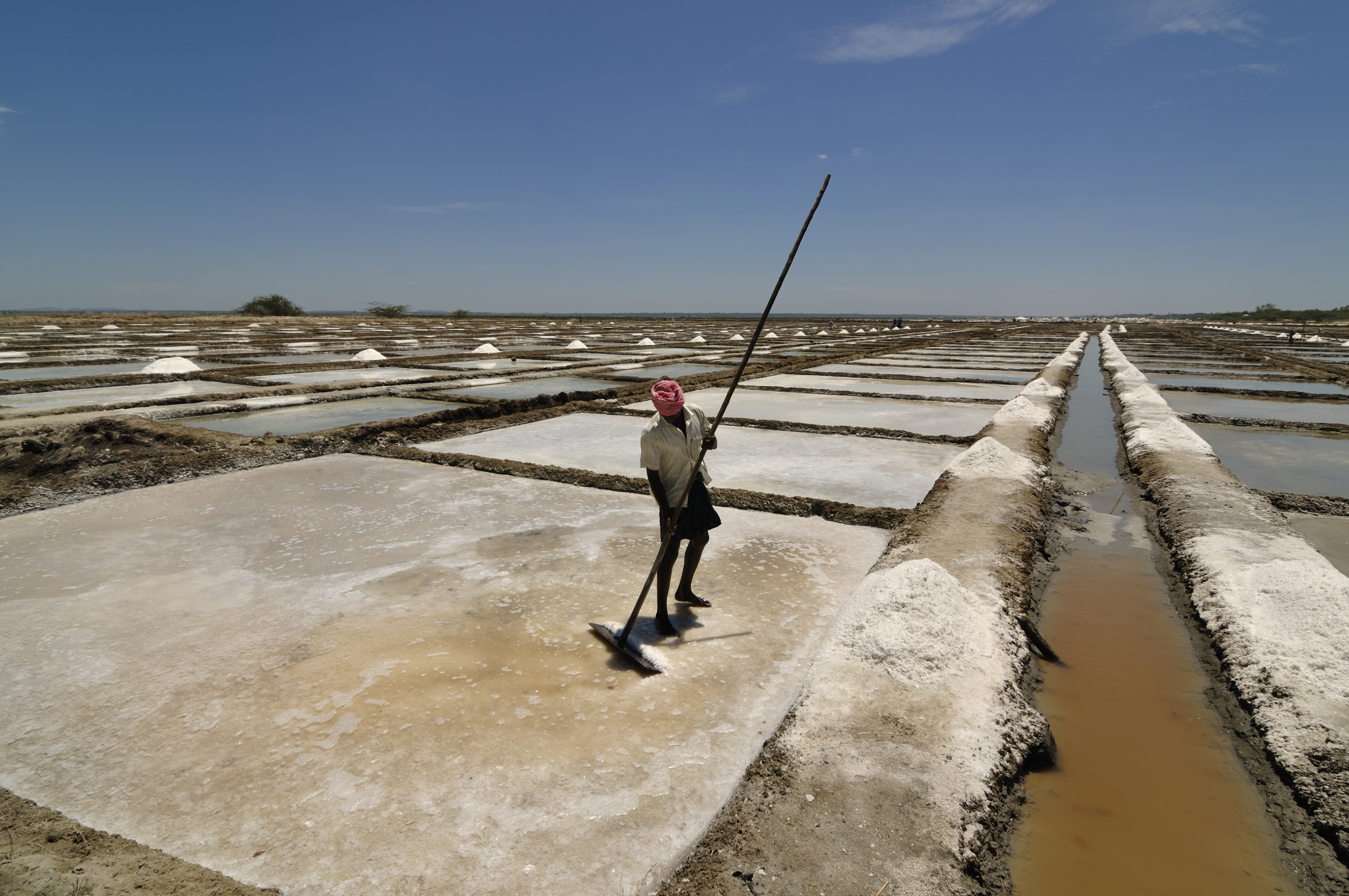
A salt evaporation pond in Tamil Nadu, India

Sea salt is salt that is produced by the evaporation of seawater. It is used as a seasoning in foods, cooking, cosmetics and for preserving food. It is also called bay salt, solar salt, or simply salt. Like mined rock salt, production of sea salt has been dated to prehistoric times.

== Composition ==
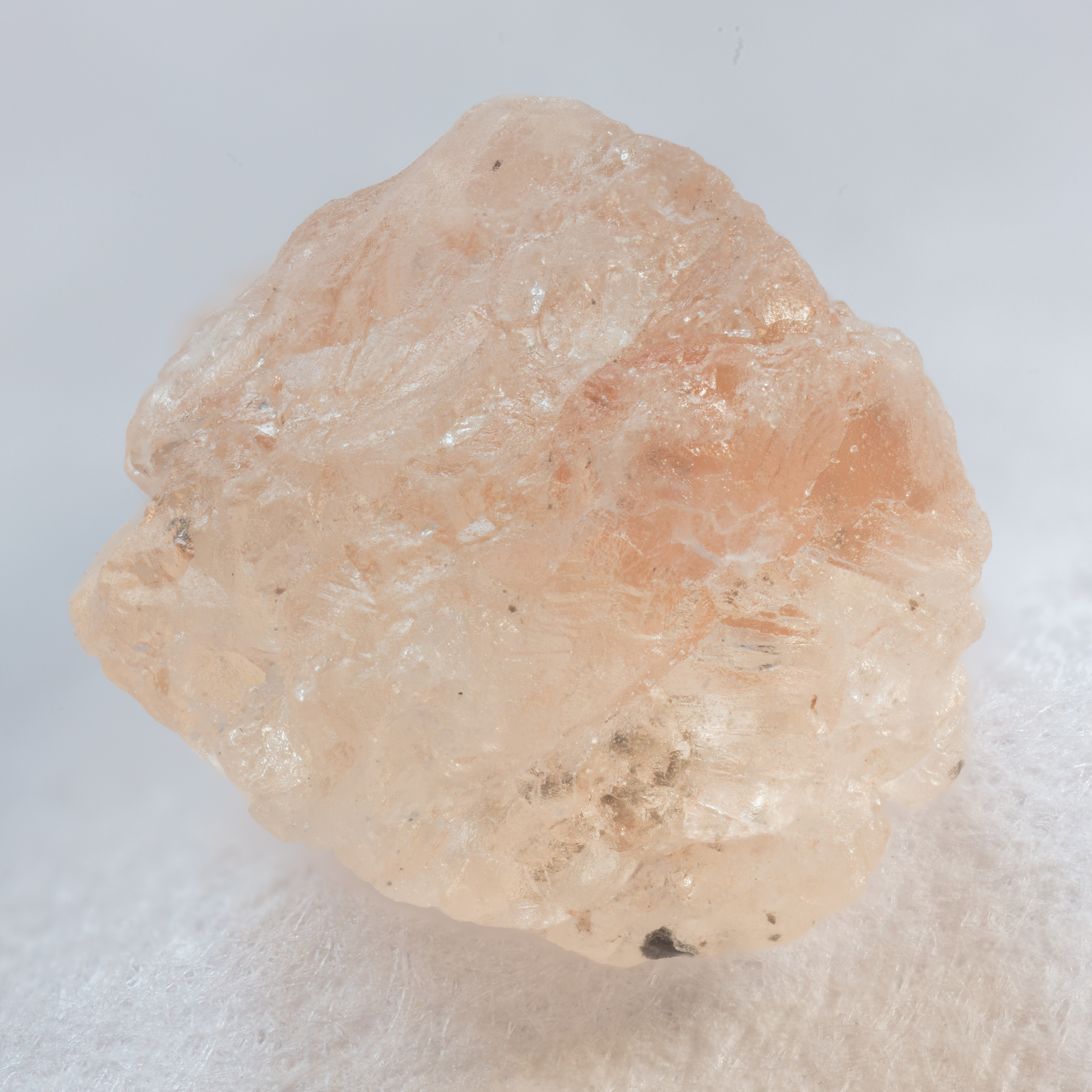
High-resolution image of a grain of sea salt

Commercially available sea salts on the market today vary widely in their chemical composition. Although the principal component is sodium chloride, the remaining portion can range from less than 0.2 to 22% of other salts. These are mostly calcium, potassium, and magnesium salts of chloride and sulfate with substantially lesser amounts of many trace elements found in natural seawater. Though the composition of commercially available salt may vary, the ionic composition of natural saltwater is relatively constant.

Concentration of ion in sea water	mg/l
Chloride	18,980
Sodium	10,556
Sulfate	2,649
Magnesium	1,262
Calcium	400
Potassium	380
Bicarbonate	140
Bromide	65
Borate	26
Strontium	13
Fluoride	1
Silicate	1
Iodide	<1
Total dissolved solids (TDS)	34,483

== Historical production ==
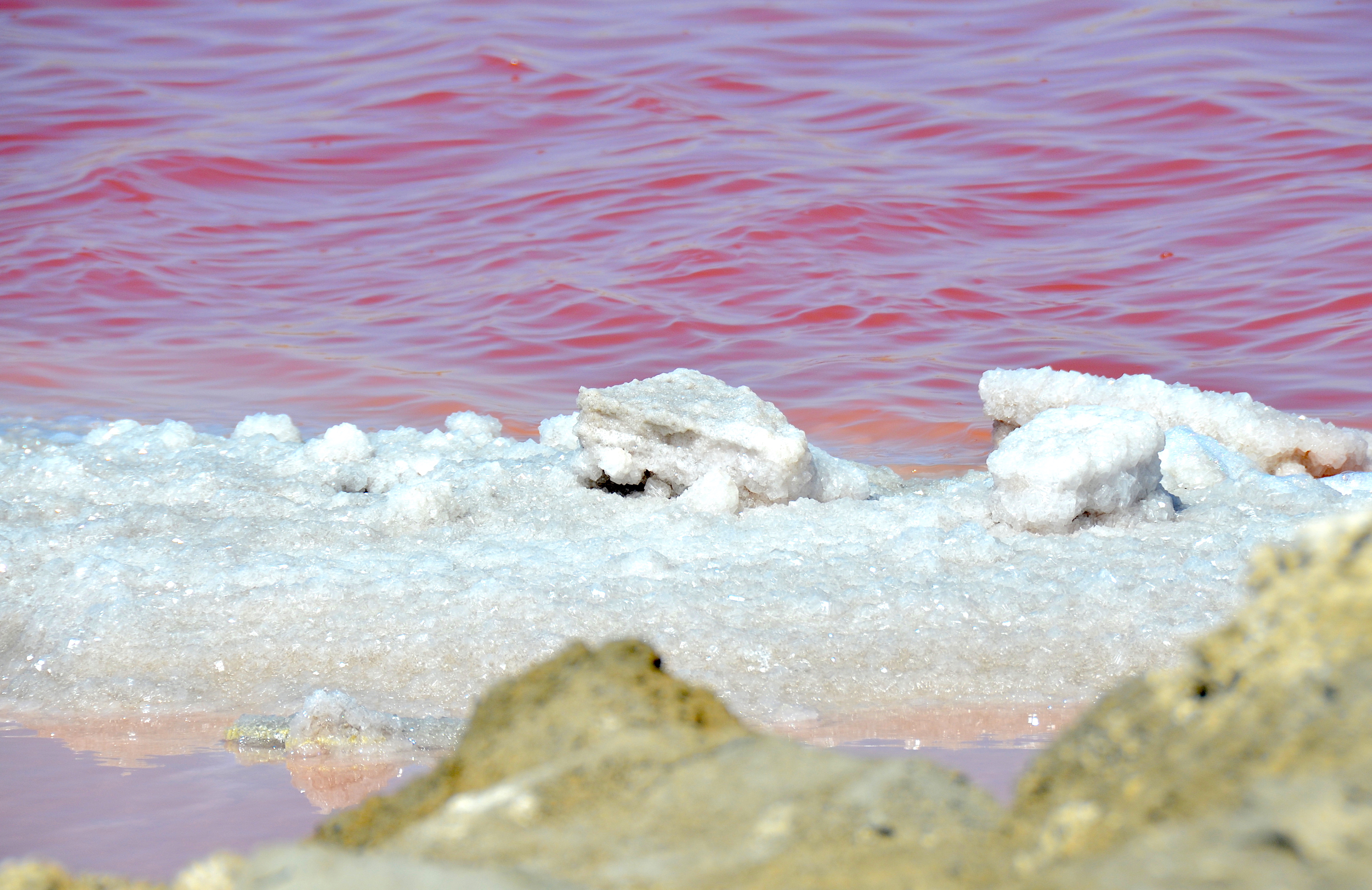
Sea salt evaporation pond at Walvis Bay. Halophile organisms giving a red colour.

Sea salt is mentioned in the Vinaya Pitaka, a Buddhist scripture compiled in the mid-5th century BC. The principle of production is evaporation of the water from the sea brine. In warm and dry climates this may be accomplished entirely by using solar energy, but in other climates fuel sources have been used. Modern sea salt production is almost entirely found in Mediterranean and other warm, dry climates.

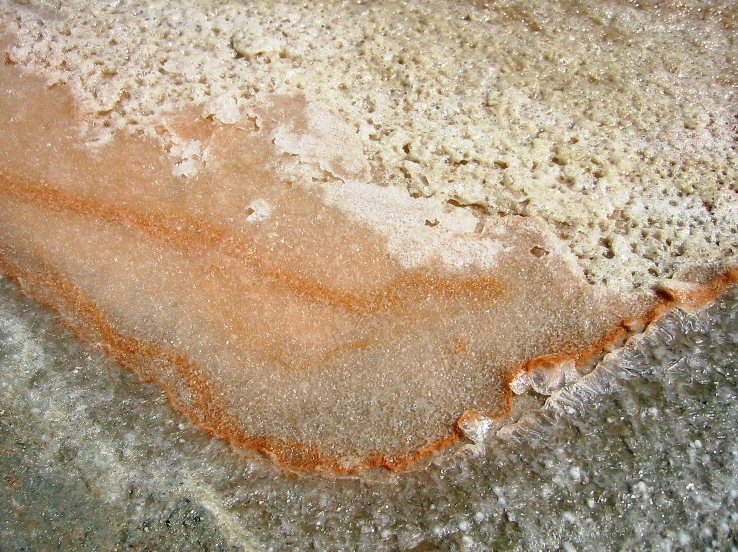
"Fleur de sel" sea salt, Île de Ré

Such places are today called salt works, instead of the older English word saltern. An ancient or medieval saltern was established where there was:

1. Access to a market for the salt
2. A gently shelving coast, protected from exposure to the open sea
3. An inexpensive and easily worked fuel supply, or preferably the sun
4. Another trade, such as pastoral farming or tanning—which benefited from proximity to the saltern (by producing leather, salted meat, etc.) and provided the saltern with a local market

In this way, salt marsh, pasture (salting), and salt works (saltern) enhanced each other economically. This was the pattern during the Roman and medieval periods around The Wash, in eastern England. There, the tide brought the brine, the extensive saltings provided the pasture, the fens and moors provided the peat fuel, and the sun sometimes shone.

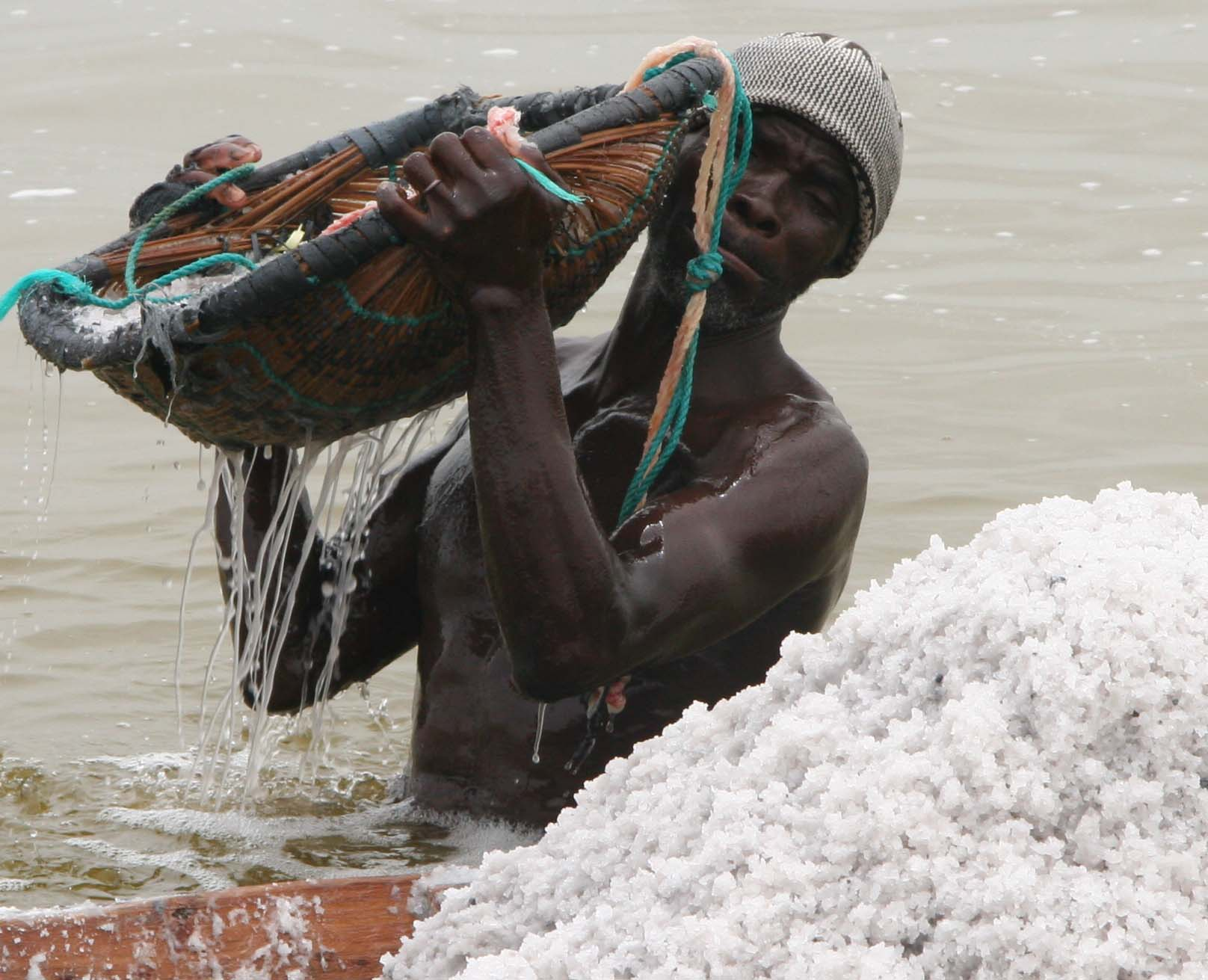
Manual salt collection in Lake Retba, Senegal

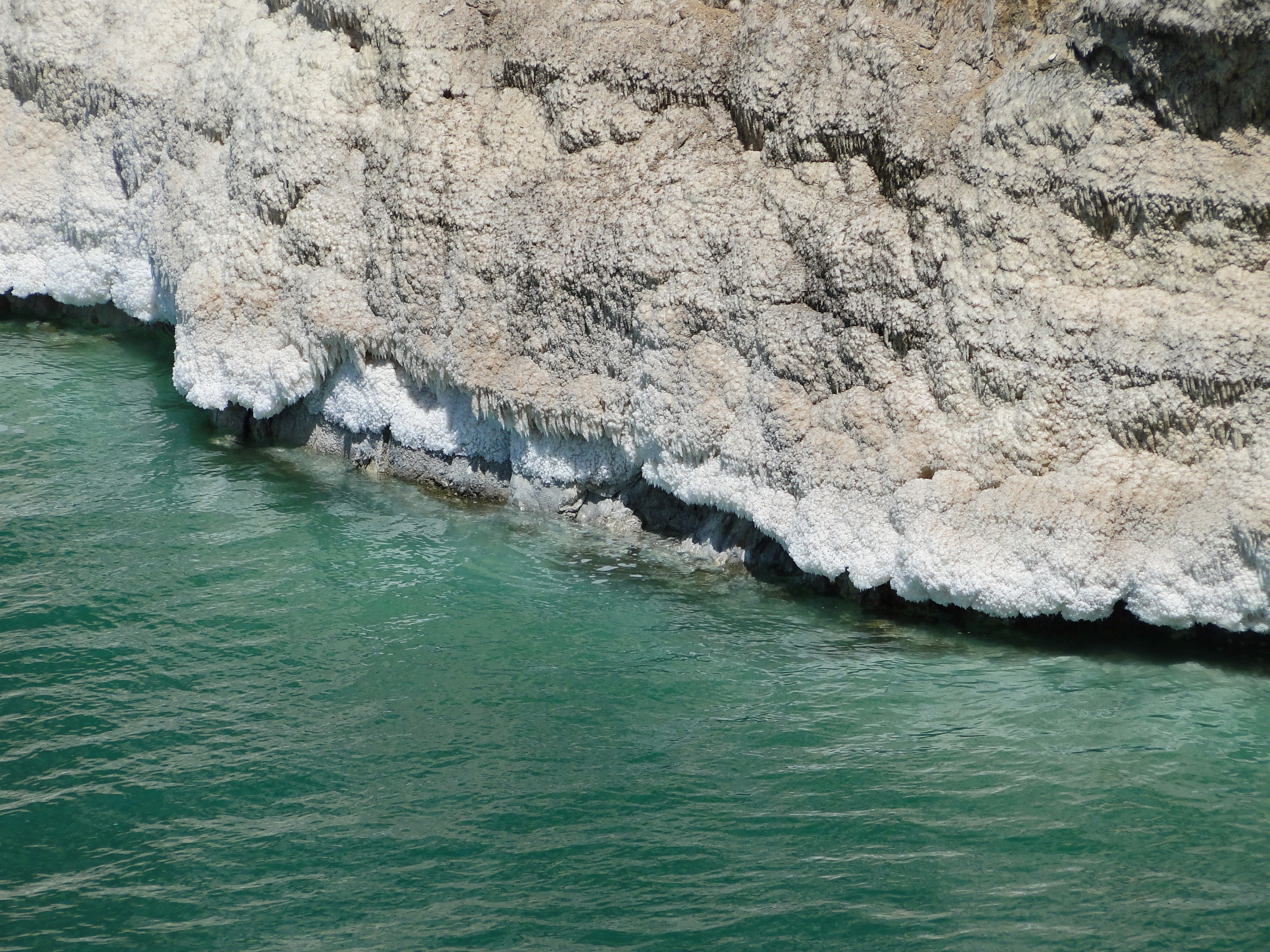
Salt deposits on the shores of Dead Sea, Jordan

The dilute brine of the sea was largely evaporated by the sun. In Roman areas, this was done using ceramic containers known as briquetage. Workers scraped up the concentrated salt and mud slurry and washed it with clean sea water to settle impurities out of the now concentrated brine. They poured the brine into shallow pans (lightly baked from local marine clay) and set them on fist-sized clay pillars over a peat fire for final evaporation. Then they scraped out the dried salt and sold it.

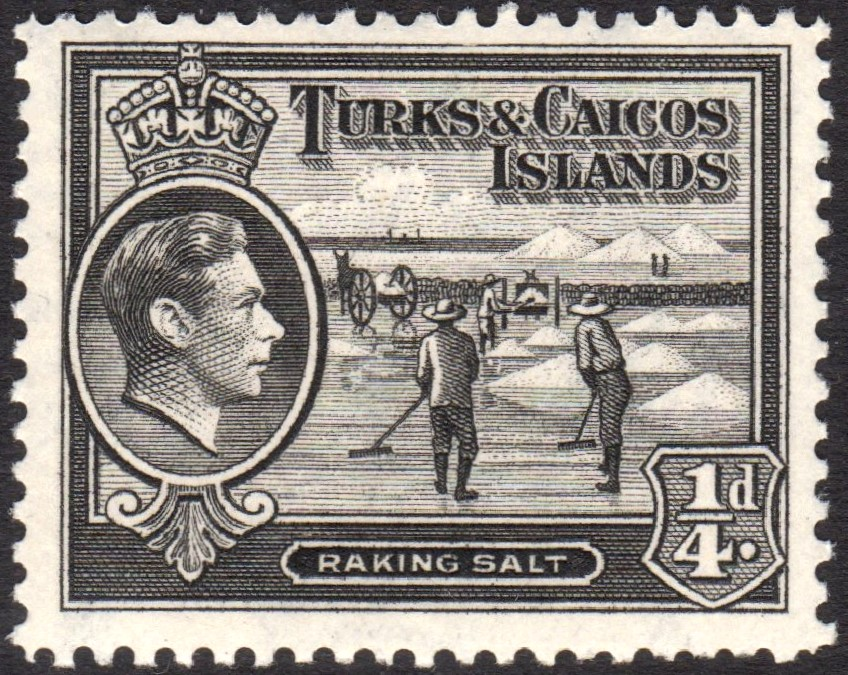
Raking salt depicted on a 1938 Turks and Caicos Islands postage stamp

In the traditional salt production of the Visayas Islands of the Philippines, salt is made from coconut husks, driftwood, or other plant matter soaked in seawater for at least several months. These are burned into ash then seawater is run through the ashes on a filter. The resulting brine is then evaporated in containers. Coconut milk is sometimes added to the brine before evaporation. The practice is endangered due to competition with cheap industrially produced commercial salt. Only two traditions survive to the present day: asín tibuok and túltul (or dúkdok).

In the colonial New World, Africans were enslaved and brought to rake salt on various islands in the West Indies, Bahamas and particularly Turks and Caicos Islands.

Today, salt labelled "sea salt" in the US might not have actually come from the sea, as long as it meets the FDA's purity requirements. All mined salts were originally sea salts since they originated from a marine source at some point in the distant past, usually from an evaporating shallow sea.

== Taste ==
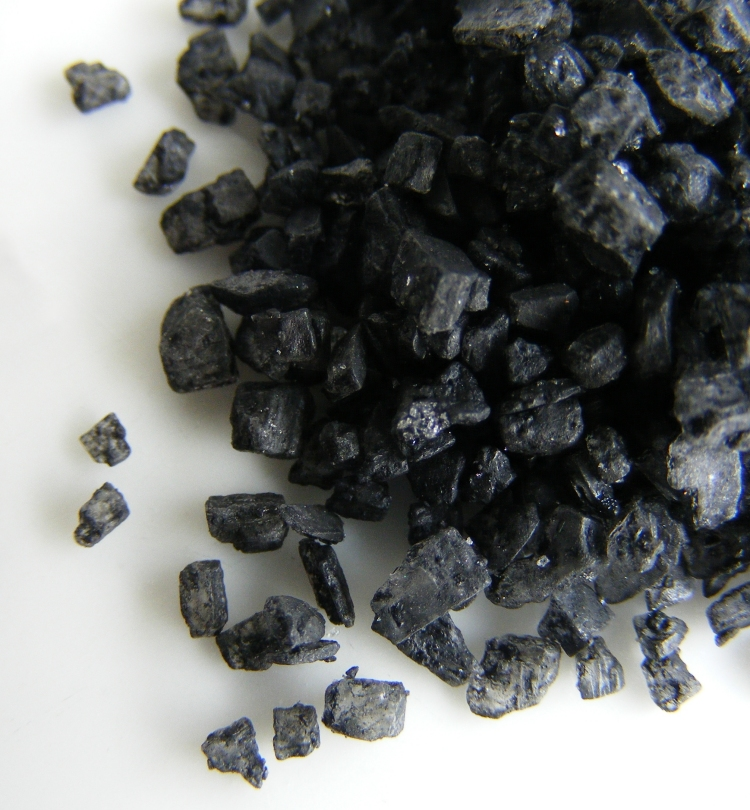
Black lava salt

Some gourmets believe sea salt tastes better and has a better texture than ordinary table salt. In applications that retain sea salt's coarser texture, it can provide a different mouthfeel, and may change flavor due to its different rate of dissolution. The mineral content also affects the taste. The colors and variety of flavors are due to local clays and algae found in the waters the salt is harvested from. For example, some boutique salts from Korea and France are pinkish gray and some from India are black. Black and red salts from Hawaii may even have powdered black lava and baked red clay added in. Some sea salt contains sulfates. It may be difficult to distinguish sea salt from other salts, such as pink Himalayan salt, Maras salt from the ancient Inca hot springs, or rock salt (halite).

Black lava salt is a marketing term for sea salt harvested from various places around the world that has been blended and colored with activated charcoal. The salt is used as a decorative condiment to be shown at the table.

== Health ==
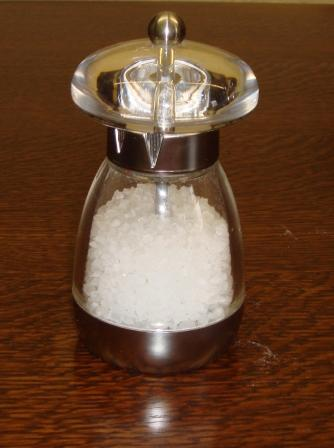
A salt mill for sea salt

The nutritional value of sea salt and table salt are about the same as they are both primarily sodium chloride. Table salt is more processed than sea salt to eliminate minerals and usually contains an additive such as silicon dioxide to prevent clumping.

Iodine, an element essential for human health, is present only in small amounts in sea salt. Iodised salt is table salt mixed with a minute amount of various salts of the element iodine.

Studies have found some microplastic contamination in sea salt from the US, Europe and China. Sea salt has also been shown to be contaminated by fungi that can cause food spoilage as well as some that may be mycotoxigenic.

In traditional Korean cuisine, jugyeom (죽염, 竹鹽), which means "bamboo salt", is prepared by roasting salt at temperatures between 800 and 2000 °C in a bamboo container plugged with mud at both ends. This product absorbs minerals from the bamboo and the mud, and is claimed to increase the anticlastogenic and antimutagenic properties of the fermented soybean paste known in Korea as doenjang. However, these claims are not substantiated by high-quality studies.

== See also ==
- Bath salts
- Brine mining
- History of salt
- Halite
