= Creamery =

Facility which produces products from milk and cream

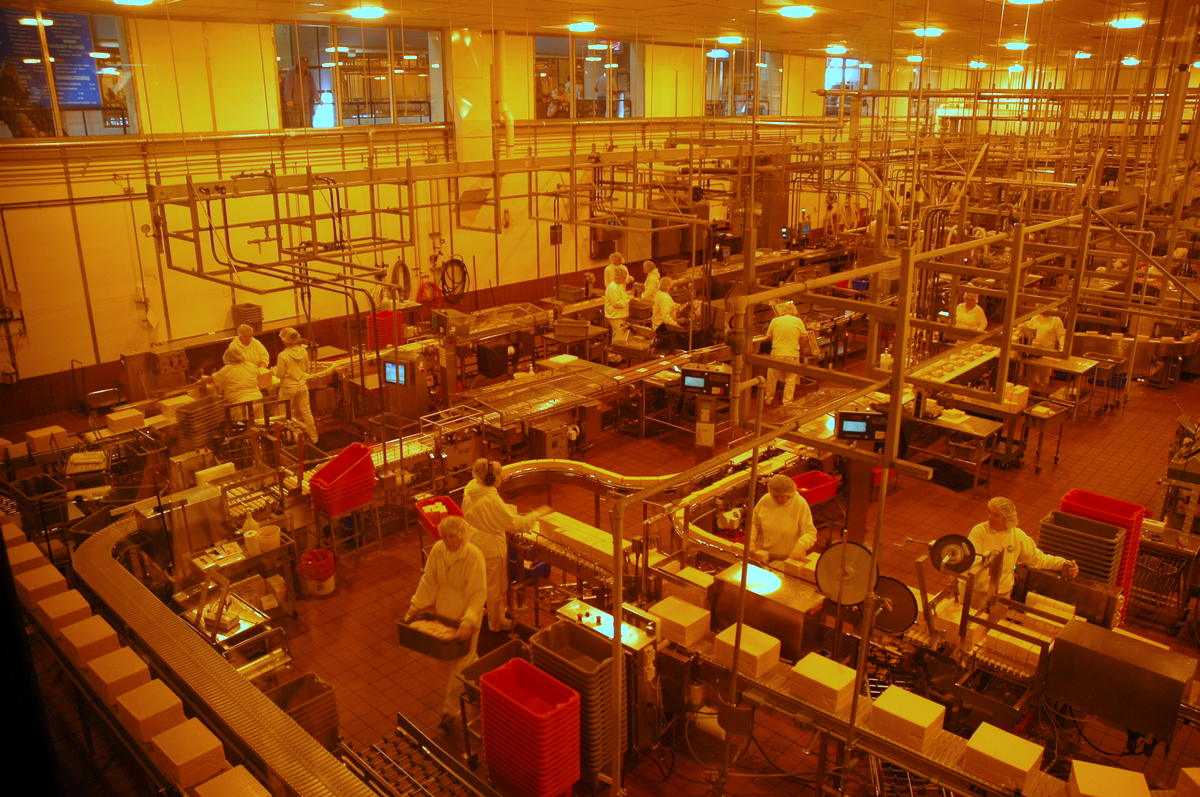
Inside the Tillamook Cheese Factory

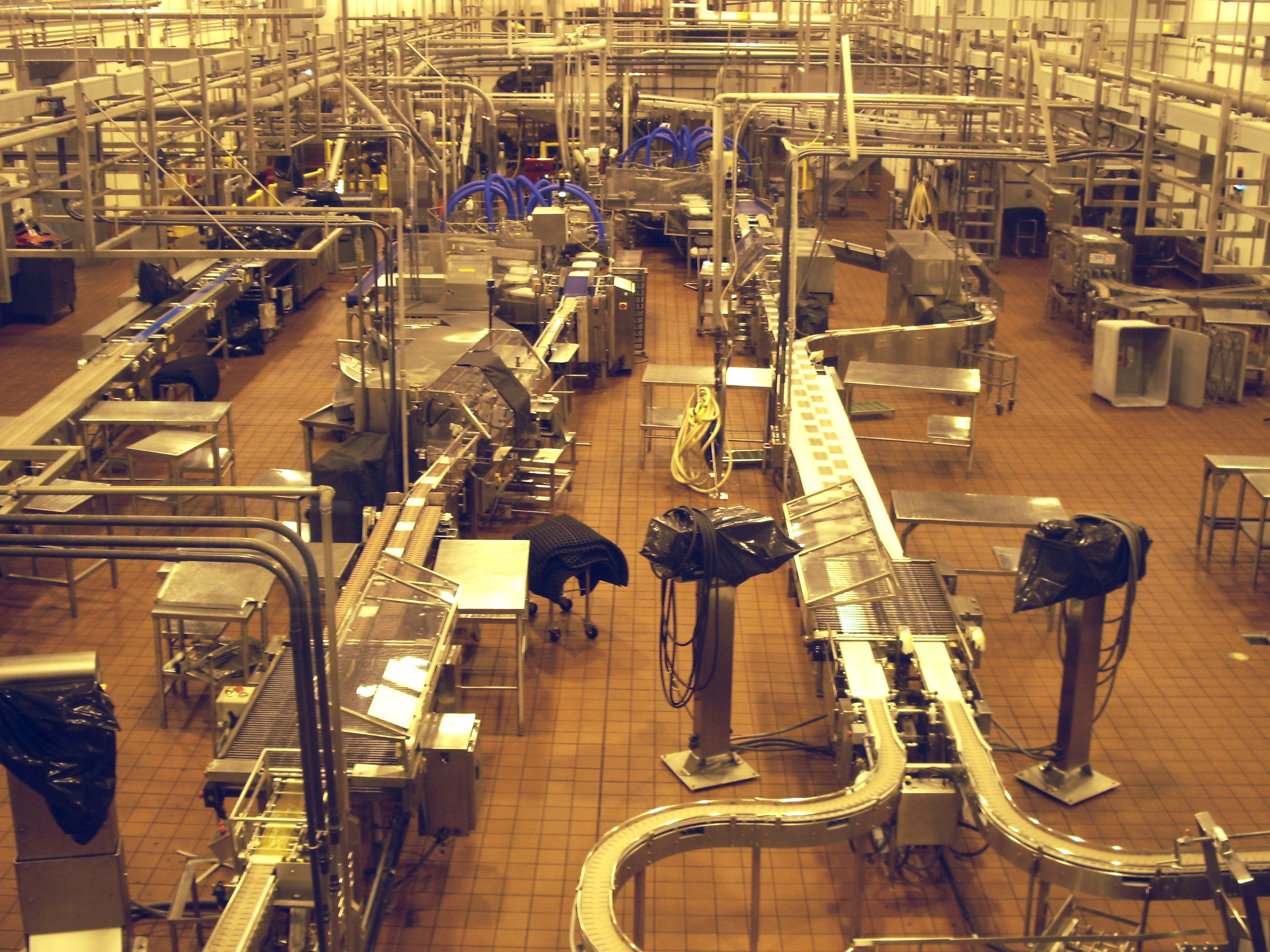
Creamery plant with small cheese block processing lines

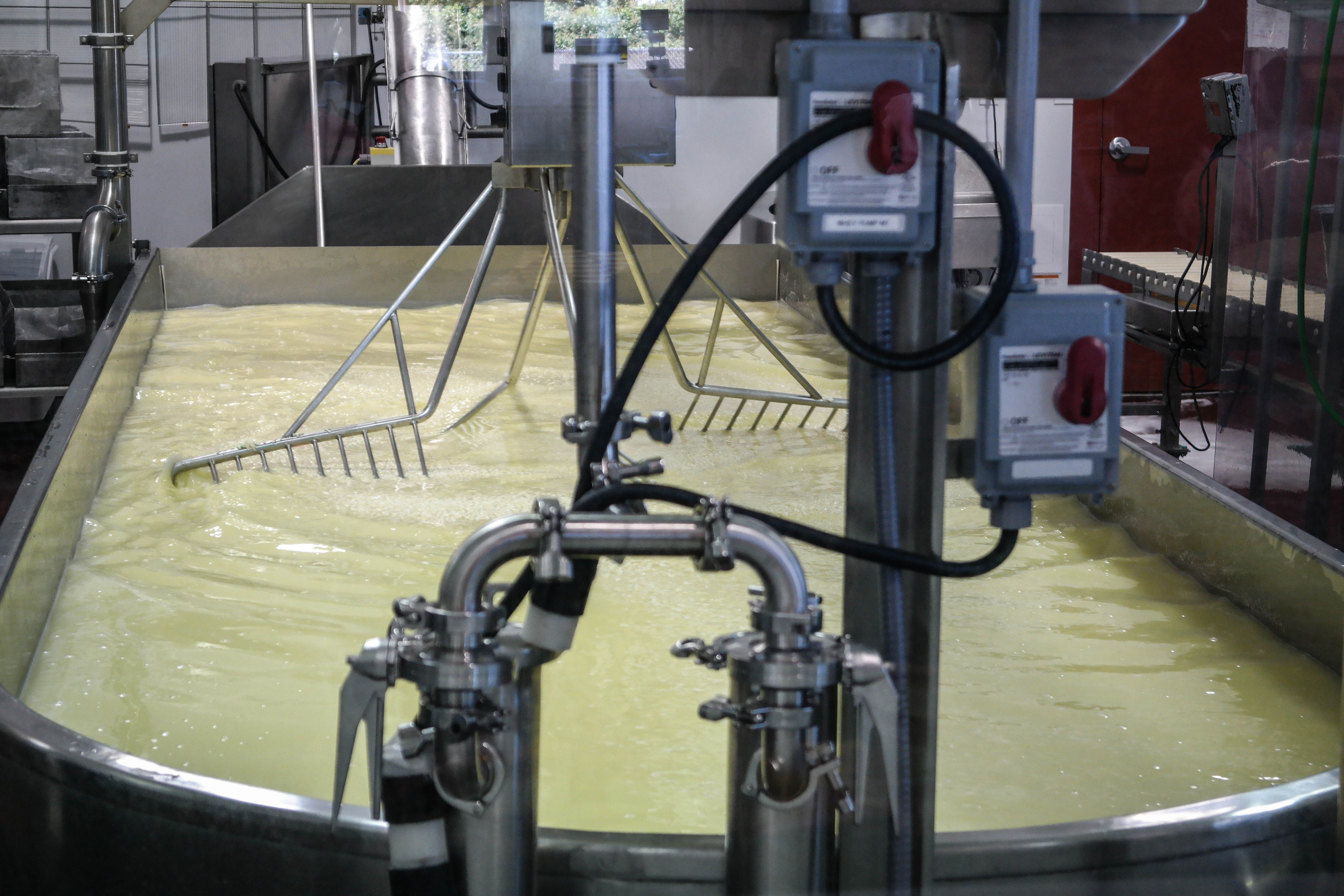
Cheese vat where milk is stirred after cultures and rennet are added to make cheese

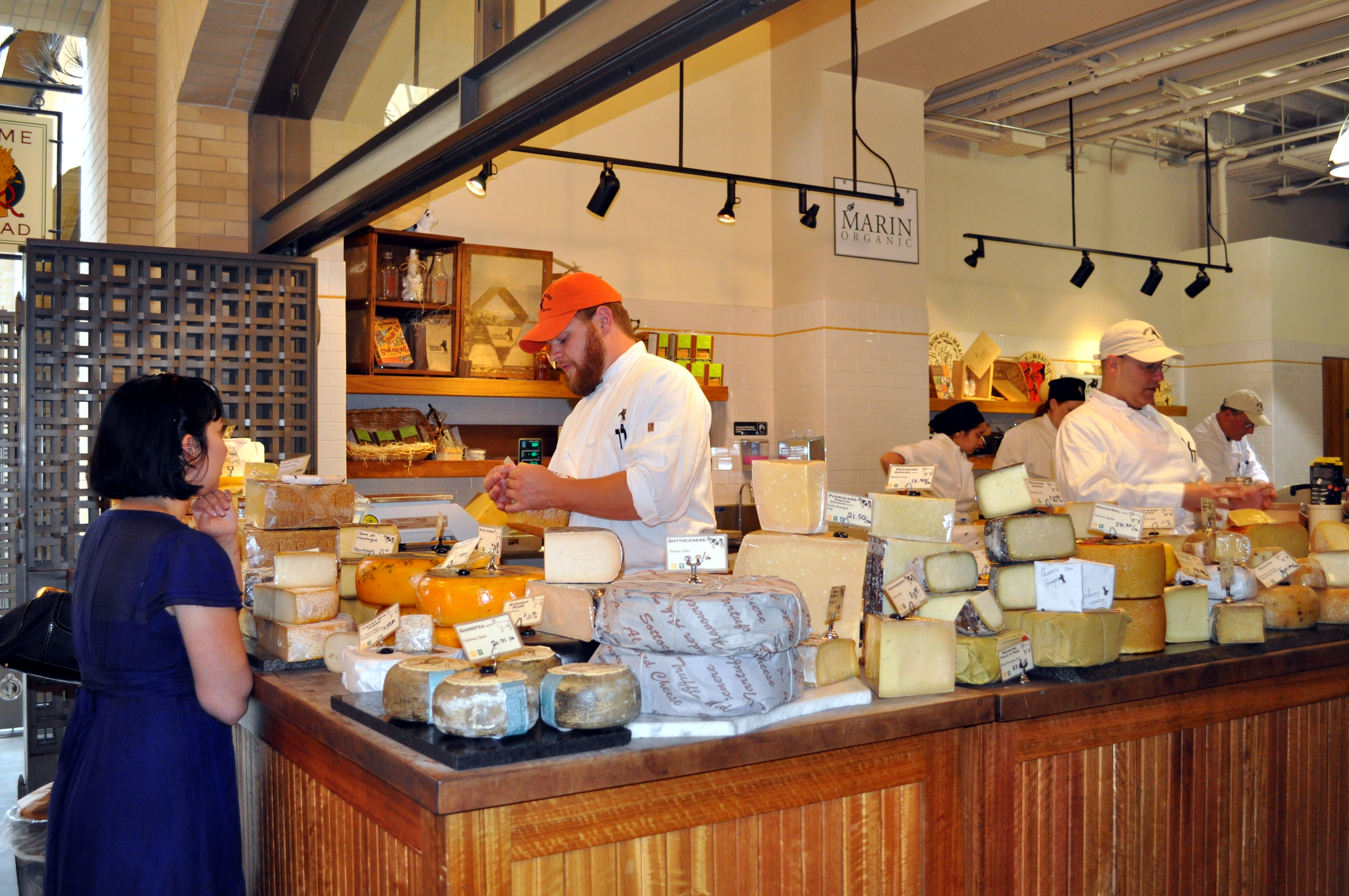
Cheese on sale at a creamery in the San Francisco ferry building

A creamery or cheese factory is a place where milk and cream are processed and where butter and cheese is produced. Cream is separated from whole milk; pasteurization is done to the skimmed milk and cream separately. Whole milk for sale has had some cream returned to the skimmed milk.

The creamery is the source of butter from a dairy. Cream is an emulsion of fat-in-water; the process of churning causes a phase inversion to butter which is an emulsion of water-in-fat. Excess liquid as buttermilk is drained off in the process. Modern creameries are automatically controlled industries, but the traditional creamery needed skilled workers. Traditional tools included the butter churn and Scotch hands.

The term "creamery" is sometimes used in retail trade as a place to buy milk products such as yogurt and ice cream. Under the banner of a creamery one might find a store also stocking pies and cakes or even a coffeehouse with confectionery.

== See also ==
- List of cheesemakers
- List of dairy products
