= Beurre Rose =

Type of butter

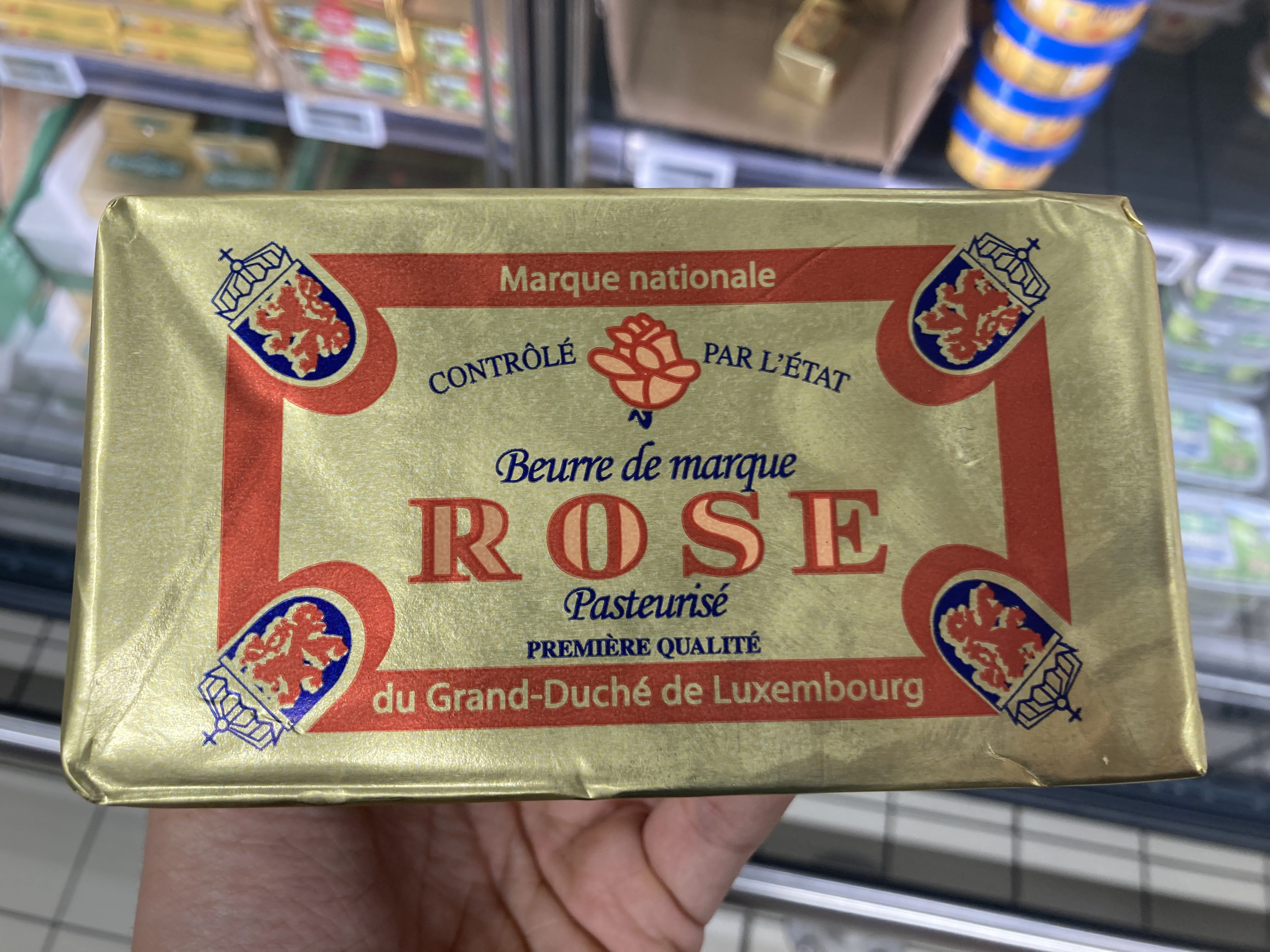
A pack of Beurre Rose in a supermarket in Kirchberg

Beurre Rose is a cultured milk butter produced in Luxembourg under the Marque Nationale of the Grand Duchy of Luxembourg. It is sometimes consumed as a spread, but most commonly used as an ingredient in a variety of sweet and savory dishes.

== History ==
The designation "Beurre de Marque Nationale Luxembourgeois" was established in 1932 by specific legislation. In 1970, the legislation was amended to establish a national protected brand name for Luxembourg butter. It holds a PDO classification in Europe, which it received in 2000.

Its name is derived from the pink quality label the Luxembourg state has awarded it for its various properties such as its spreadability and its taste.

== Production method ==
Beurre Rose was previously made in the traditional way, but today it is made using continuous churning methods. The butter is checked 15 times a year chemically and organoleptically by sampling. This inspection is carried out in addition to all the usual tests for quality and hygiene that are carried out on all food products.

== See also ==
- Beurre d'Ardenne
- Beurre d'Isigny
- Rucava white butter
