= Istoben cattle =

Breed of cattle

The Istoben cattle was a cattle breed named after the settlement of Istoben in the Kirov region of Russia where a large creamery was established. They were recognized in 1943.

According to the results of the 1981 evaluation, the average annual milk production of mature cows was 3107 kilograms (6850 pounds), and the fat content was 3.83%.
