= Souring bag =

Bag used for fermenting milk

A souring bag (also called émesesley, agiwir, or tanwart) is a hide or leather bag used for fermenting milk. It is used by Berbers, especially Touareg.

Nicolaisen (1963) describes the method of souring milk in the Ahaggar (Hoggar Mountains): "Milk of the morning yield is put into a skin bag ("émesesley")... to remain in this bag until the next morning when the churning takes place. During the hot season the "émesesley", filled with milk, is placed in the shade of the tent in daytime, while in winter it is placed in sunshine, or close to the fire. Some milk of the evening yield is sometimes added to the morning milk in the "émesesley". Before churning (into butter) the milk thus soured is poured into the proper churning bag ("agiwir", "tanwart") which is inflated and shaken".

Such bags are described in Encyclopedie Berbere and can be found in some ethnographic museums.
