= Butter churning in Nepal =

Component of culture and identity of Nepal

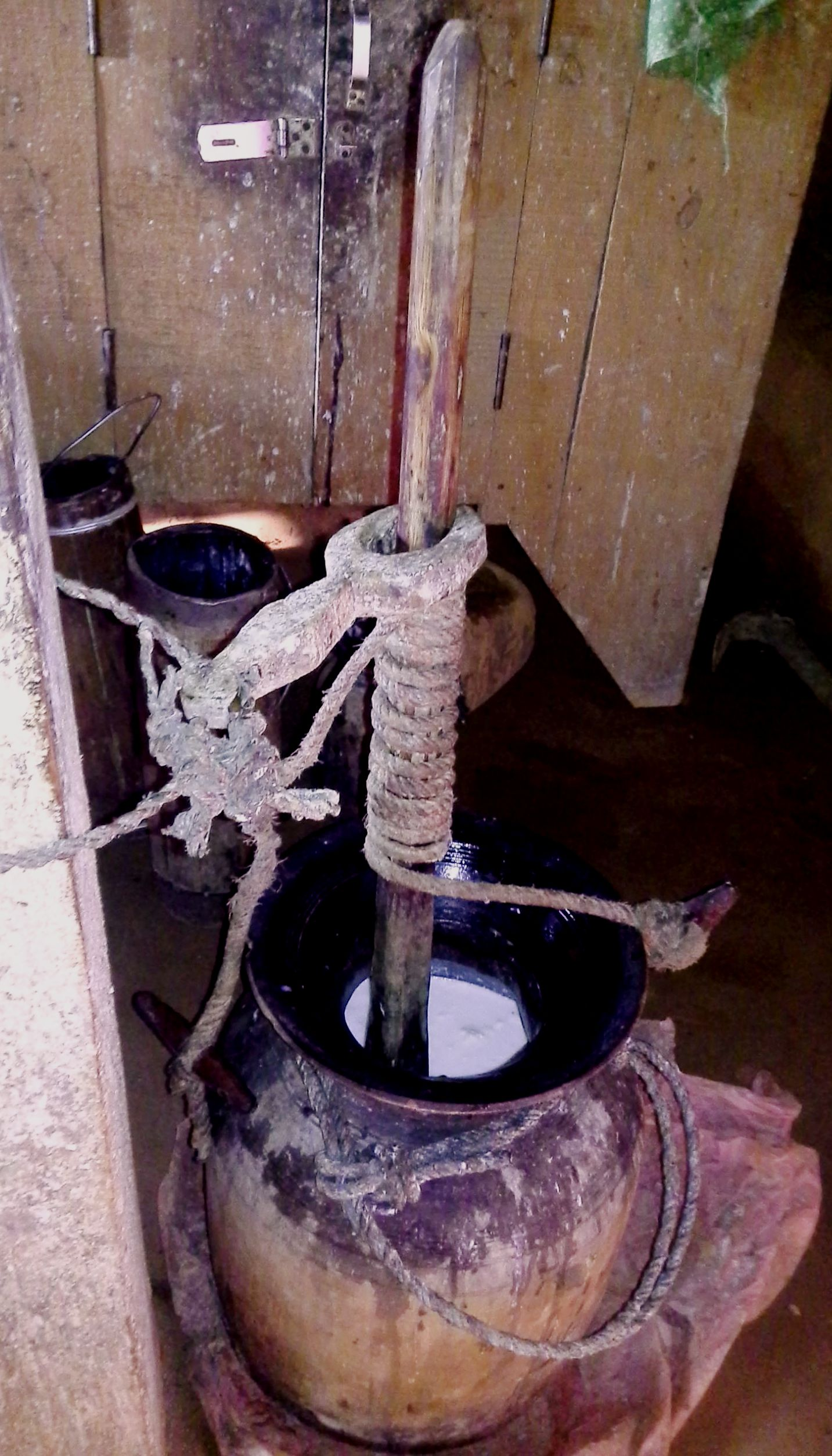
A setup for churning butter

The churning of butter is an important part of Nepalese livelihood. Not only a part of day-to-day activity, it is a component of traditional culture and identity of Nepalese society. It involves the separation of butter from curd by the action of centrifugation using a series of traditional devices.

== Devices used in churning butter ==
=== Theki ===
Theki (Nepali: ठेकी) is the largest of all devices used in churning butter, and is the primary device used. Cylindrical in shape at the body, it has a narrow neck while the mouth is a spreading fan-like structure. It is most commonly made up of darigitho (Nepali: दारीगिठो) wood, so commonly called as Daar ko theki in rural areas. Rhododendron (Nepali: गुराँस) is also used. It is used to hold the curd during the process and is where the Madaani is inserted.

=== Madaani ===
Madaani, (Nepali: मदानी) also known as Ghupa, it is the most important and major functional device used in the churning process. It is a tool made with the following parts:

1. Saro (Nepali: सरो) It is a long, solid, cylindrical structure made up of Falat (Nepali: फलाँट) or Katus (Nepali: कटुस) wood. It is connected to Pora at the end and is where Neti is wound around.
2. Pora (Nepali: पोरा)-It is the fan like structure at the base of Madaani, made of same wood as Saro. It has four blunt blade like structures used for whirling of the curd. It can be considered as a centrifuging machine in technical words.
3. Neti (Nepali: नेती) is the rope wound over Saro, with two free ends made up of small cylindrical woods tied on the rope called Koila, for holding by a person to move it to and fro. It can be made up nylon or paddy straw.

=== Torso or taro ===
(Nepali: तोर्सो/तरो) It is a flat structure consisting of hole at one end to let the Saro of Madaani in and thereby holding it in place while tied with a rope at the other end to hold it on a supporting structure. It can be made up of any wood but Falat (Nepali: फलाँट) and Katus (Nepali: कटुस) are considered the best.

=== Dhungro ===
(Nepali: ढुंग्रो) It is a hollow, cylindrical structure made up of bamboo (Nepali: बाँस) used for holding the churned milk at the end of the churning process.

== Process of churning ==
The curd accumulated over a period of few days is brought and collected in the Theki. Then, Madaani held onto the Torso is inserted inside the Theki. Then Neti is moved to and fro until butter separates from the curd. Addition of hot water at the middle of the process can fasten the process but care should be given to the period and amount of water to be added. Addition of more water at the latter stages of the process can significantly decrease the butter content. The completion of the process is detected by moving the Pora around the surface of the churned liquid where butter separates from rest of the liquid and accumulate into a mold. It takes about 20 minutes. Then, butter is taken out and collected, while churned milk (Nepali: मोही) is collected in Dhungro.

Werner Egli described the butter churning process as follows:

After three to four days [of fermentation] butter churning can be started. For this purpose a wooden churning-stick is used, which is rotated by moving a cord back and forth. By the drill movement butter lumps are produced which are skimmed off by hand. Afterwards the butter is wrapped into a leather blanket and is pressed until it reaches the desired consistency.

== Gallery ==
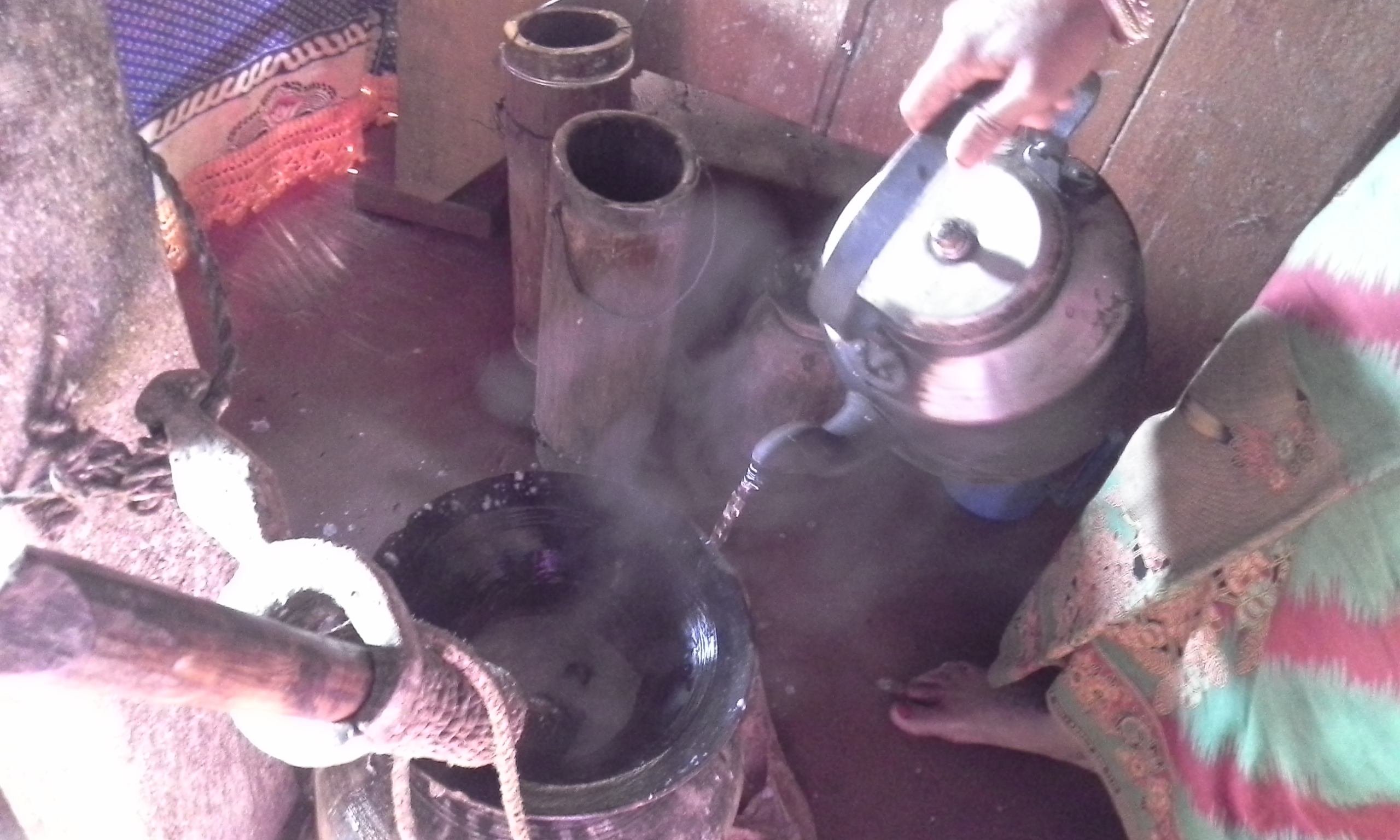
Addition of hot water in the middle of the process can speed up the process

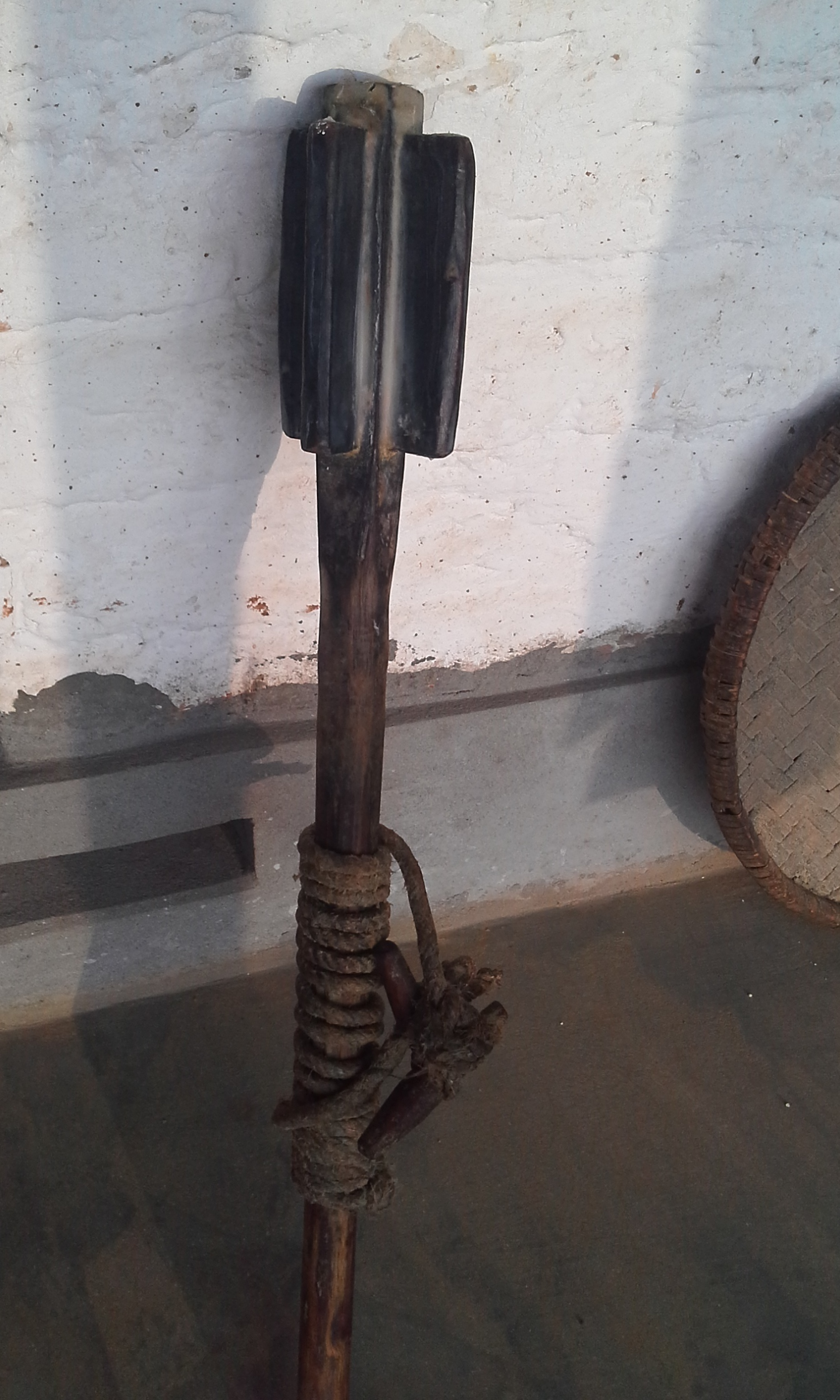
Madaani, the upper fan-like structure is called Pora while the lower cylindrical one wound with Neti is called Saro.

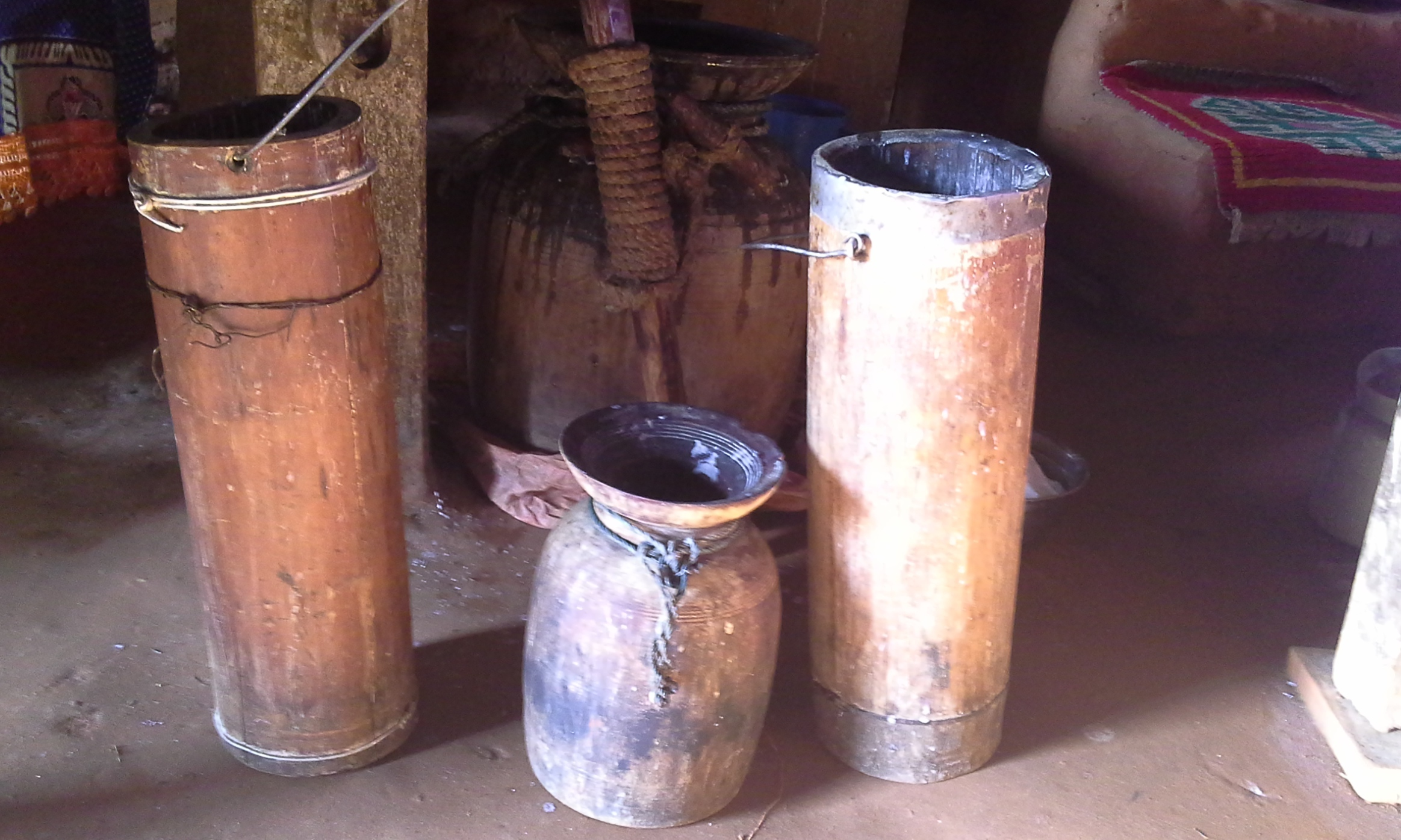
Dhungro (ढुंग्रो)- two at the sides, the middle one is small Theki

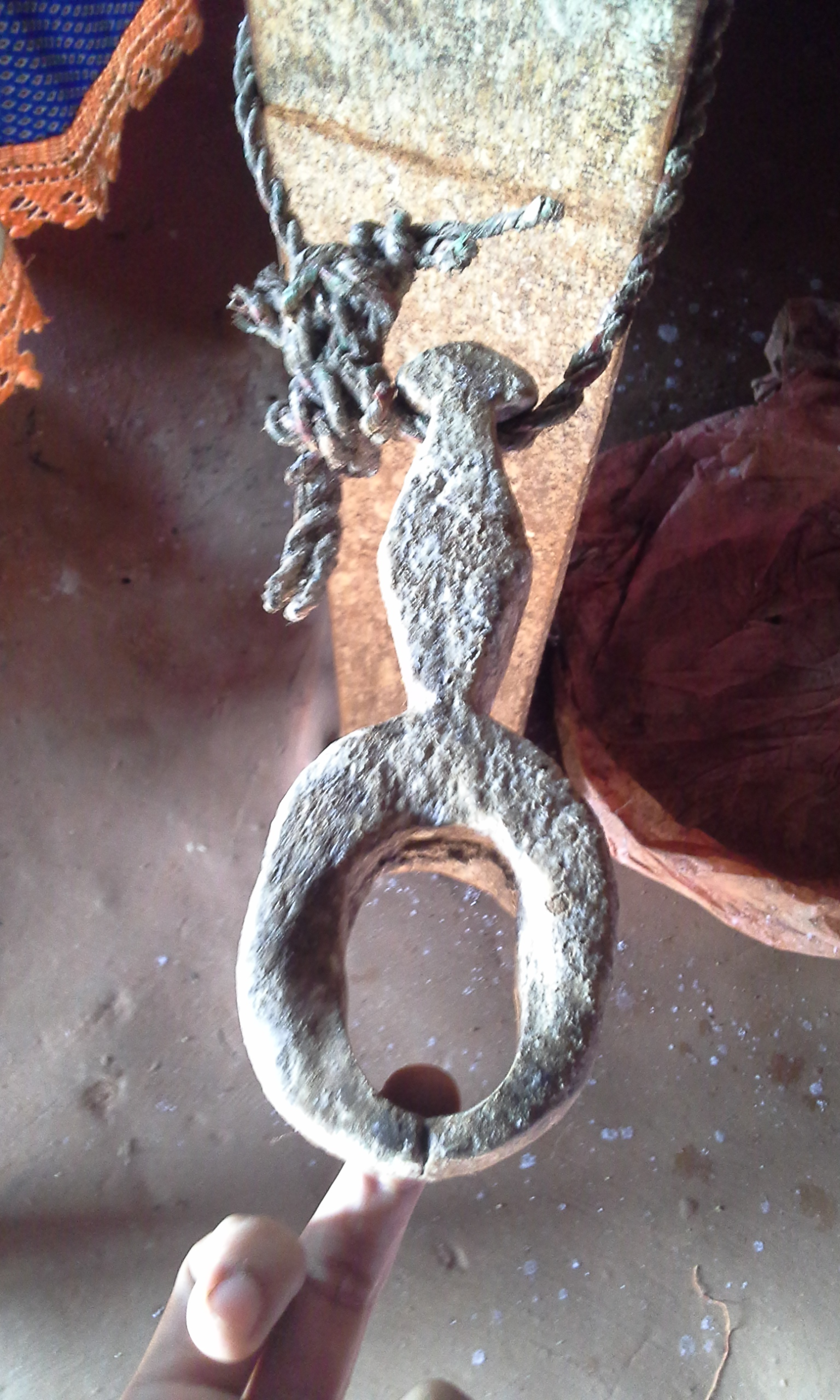
Torso (तोर्सो)

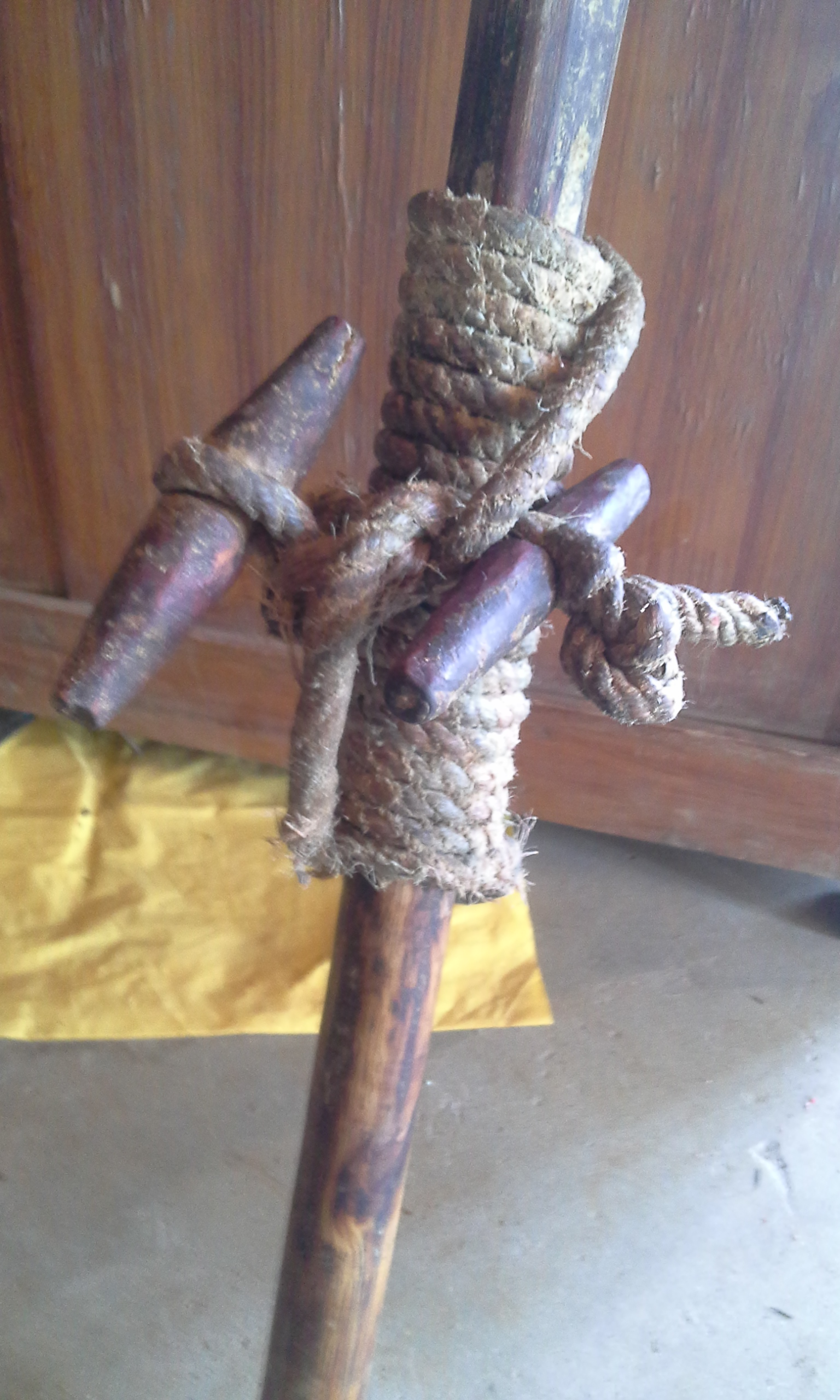
The whole rope set up is Neti (Nepali:नेती), and the small wooden blocks tied at the end are called Koila.

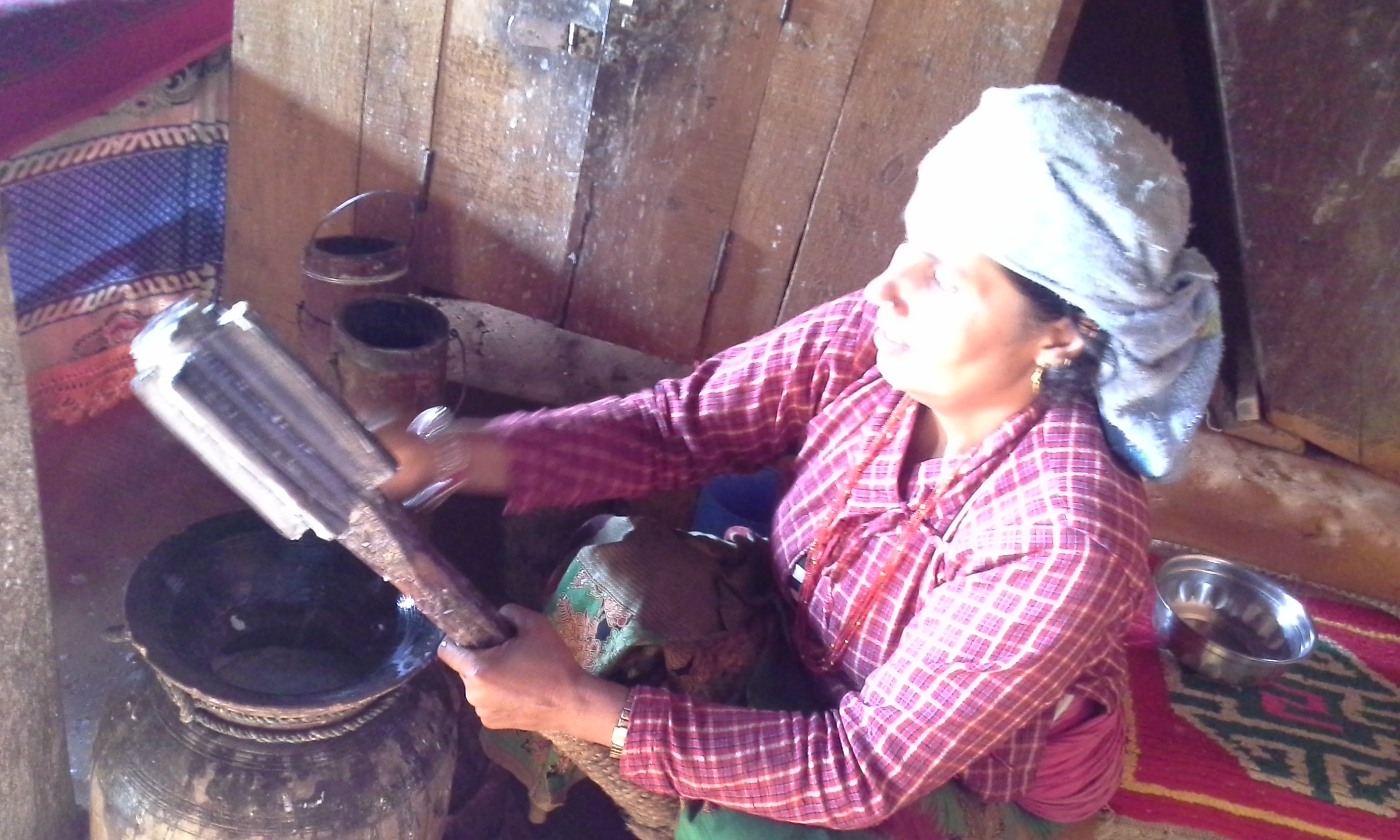
A woman extracting butter at the end of the process

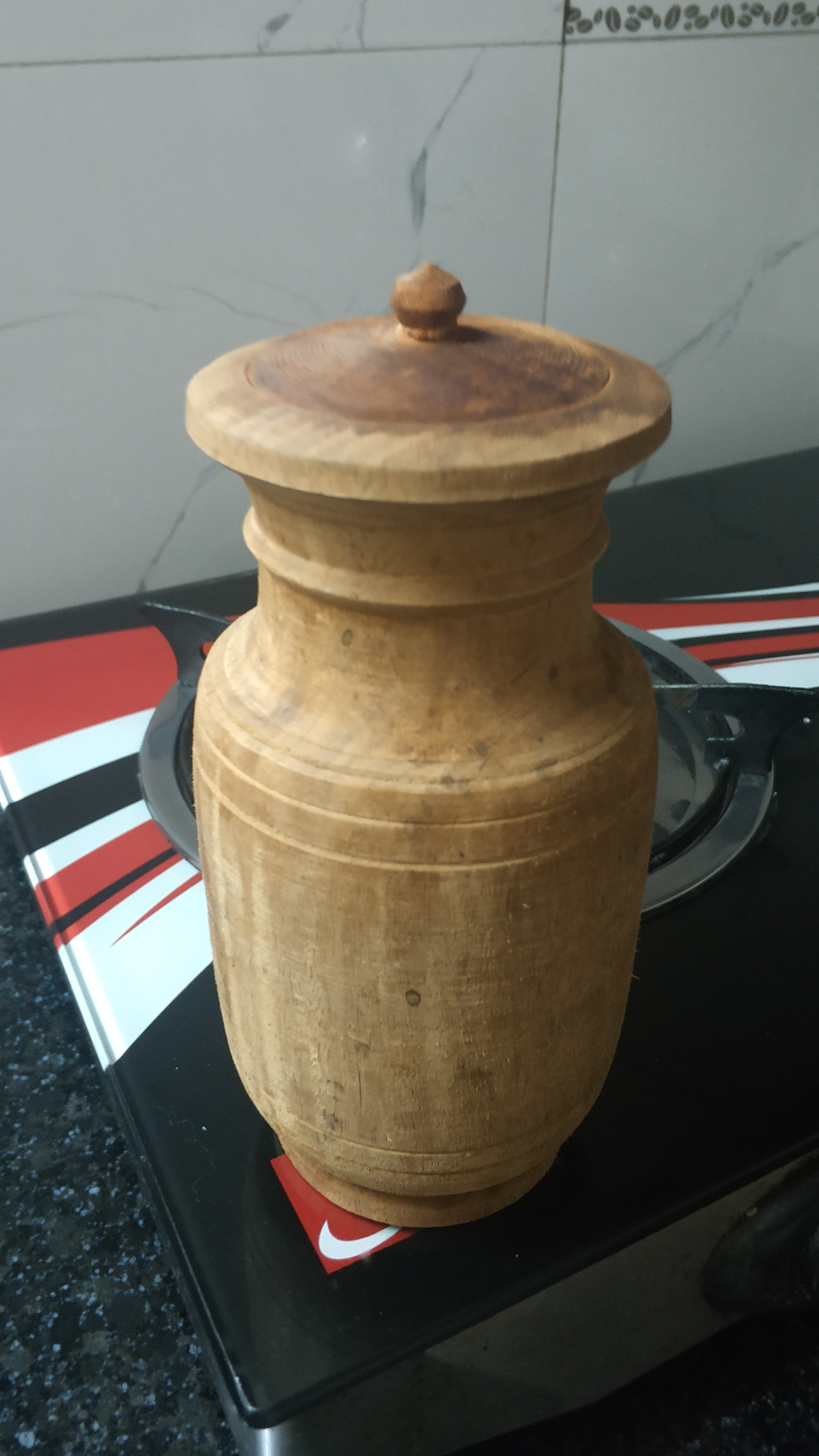
Butter churning pot

== See also ==
- Butter-churn tower, named after its similarity to a type of butter churn
- Nepalese cuisine
