= Rucava white butter =

Latvian cow's milk butter

Rucava white butter (Latvian: Rucavas baltais sviests) is a traditional cow's-milk butter produced in Rucava, Latvia, since the early 20th century. The butter has Protected Designation of Origin classification in the European Union, which it received in 2018.

== See also ==
- Beurre d'Ardenne
- Beurre d'Isigny
- Beurre Rose
