= Firkin (unit) =

Unit of volume

A firkin is a unit of volume or mass used in several situations. Its etymology is likely to be from the Middle English ferdekyn, probably from the Middle Dutch diminutive of vierde 'fourth' (a firkin originally contained a quarter of a barrel). Firkin also describes a small wooden cask or tub for butter, lard, liquids, or fish.

== American unit of dry volume ==
A firkin was an American unit of dry measure.

1 firkin = 9 US gallons = 34 litres

American naturalist John Burroughs (1837–1921) in his boyhood memoir described a firkin as weighing 100 pounds when loaded with salted butter.

== British unit for butter and cheese ==
A firkin was a British unit for the sale of butter and cheese.

1 firkin = 56 pounds = 25 kilograms

== British unit of volume for beer and wine ==
A firkin was also a British unit for the sale of beer. It is one quarter of a barrel and its value depends on the current size of a barrel, but at present:

1 firkin = 0.25 barrel = 9 imperial gallons = 10.8 U.S. gallons = 41 litres

A wine firkin was much larger: 1 wine firkin = 70 imperial gallons.

== See also ==
- FFF system
