= Bretel butter =

French brand of canned butter popular in Vietnam

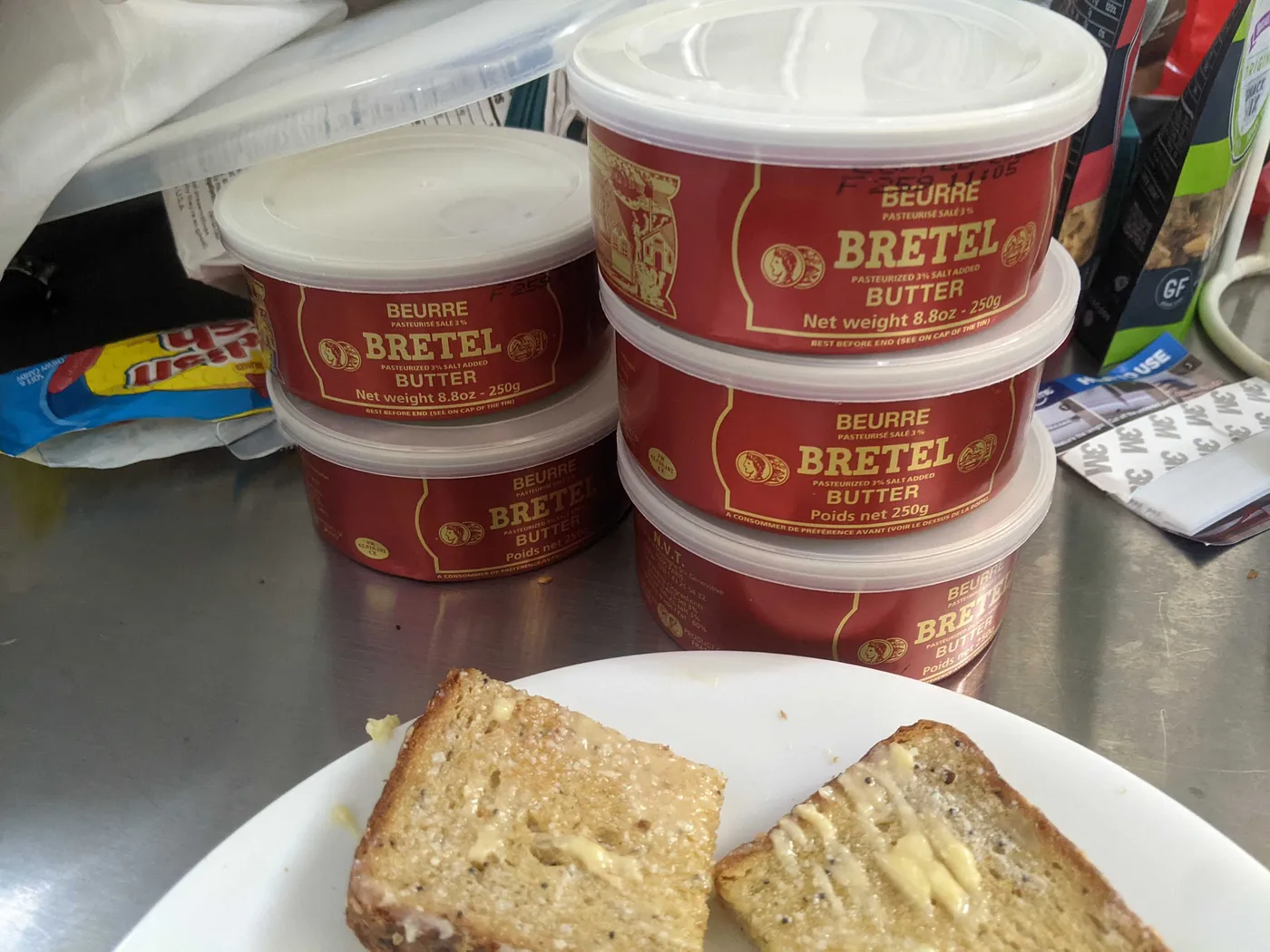
Cans of Bretel butter with a plate of toast.

Bretel butter is a brand of canned butter popular among Vietnamese people. It is exported from France.

== History ==
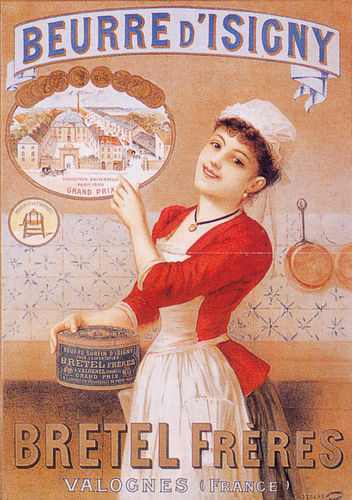
Ad for Bretel butter, 1900.

The Bretel butter company, named after the brothers Eugène and Adolphe Bretel, was started in 1871. Business grew until it formed an oligopoly along with Lepelletier brand butter in the English market. In 1888, the Journal of the Society of the Arts reported that each of the two companies exported 80 to 100 pounds of butter to Britain per week. By 1903, La Maison Bretel Frères had a revenue of 29 million francs, making 80% of their money from exports.

The butter won international awards in Paris in 1878, Chicago in 1893, and Paris in 1900. Awards were depicted as gold medals on the top of the can, leading Vietnamese people to nickname the butter bơ đồng tiền, meaning "coin butter".

== Taste ==
Modern Bretel butter is known for its creamy umami flavor; compared to American butter, European butter is often cultured. It is classified as a demi-sel butter, with 3% salt. Historically, Bretel, as well as other butters imported to the "French Indochine", likely contained more salt, as well as boric acid as a preservative. Boric acid has since been banned as a food additive.

== Cultural significance ==
French colonists living in Vietnam (then known as the "French Indochine") preferred to eat preserved imports from Europe rather than local food. Imported canned and preserved foods became associated with whiteness and wealth. Regular citizens who were not wealthy enough to have tasted the canned butter used the empty cans to measure amounts of rice. The butter is so nostalgic to Vietnam that ex-pats often prefer this butter over fresh butter, even buying it online when they cannot find it locally.

== Manufacturing ==
The Bretel company employed the Normandy butter blending process to create a product with a uniform and consistent quality. In 1891, a reporter from Brandstreet's Weekly wrote about a tour of a Bretel factory that employed 200 people. Butter was purchased from farms and markets on the day it was churned. Before and after blending, the butter was stored in caves to keep cool. On the next day, the butter was sorted into one of four grades. Large steam-powered machines worked and mixed the butter. The first two grades were distributed fresh, while a little salt was added to the third grade, and extra salt added to the fourth grade, "as well as to all butter sent in tins to hot countries". The cans were filled up-side-down, so that the markings on the top would not be affected, and a final machine attached the can bottoms. By the third day after churning, some of the butter was already in London. The Bretel company preferred butter that was not made using cream separators, because their butter was cultured, "ripened by being partly skimmed from milk that is more or less sour". The remaining skim milk was used to fatten veal calves. In the winter, the butter was whiter than in the summer because the cows ate only hay, and liquid annatto was added to make it yellow.

The factory produced thirty two-pound rolls per minute, which added up to about sixty thousand pounds of butter per day, and twenty million pounds per year. One case of butter contained twenty-four pounds. Each week, eight to nine thousand cases were exported to England, and two to three thousand cases to Brazil.

The current [when?] manufacturer of Bretel butter is Briois, the same manufacturer as Beurdell butter, which is similarly canned.

== Ownership ==
In 1933, the Bretel company, which included 17 factories, changed hands to Raoul Le Doux, nephew of the brothers Bretel. In 1960, the company was purchased by the Bricquebec dairy association, but the trademark for Bretel was filed by Ngo Van The in 1964. Ngo Van The remains the distributor, as evidenced by the N. V. T. initials on the cans, even as Bricquebec dairy association was taken over in 1972 by Gloria Group. The butter is actively manufactured today [when?] and consumed by Vietnamese people around the world.

== See also ==
- Beurre d'Isigny
