= Beurre d'Isigny =

Butter from around Isigny-sur-Mer, France

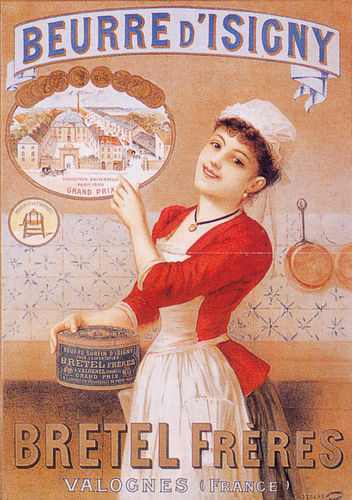
Ad for the butter, 1900.

Beurre d'Isigny (French pronunciation: [bœʁ diziɲi]; lit. 'Butter of Isigny') is a type of cow's milk butter made in the Veys Bay area and the valleys of the rivers running into it, comprising several French communes surrounding Isigny-sur-Mer and straddling the Manche and Calvados departments of Normandy, northern France.

The butter has a natural golden colour as a result of high levels of carotenoids. The butter contains 82% fatty solids and is rich in oleic acid and mineral salts (particularly sodium). These salts provide flavour and a long shelf-life.

The local producers requested protection for their milk products as early as the 1930s with a definition of the production area, finally receiving PDO status in 1996.

== See also ==
- Bretel butter
- Rucava white butter
- Beurre d'Ardenne
- Beurre Rose
