= Scotch hands =

Wooden spatulas used to make butter

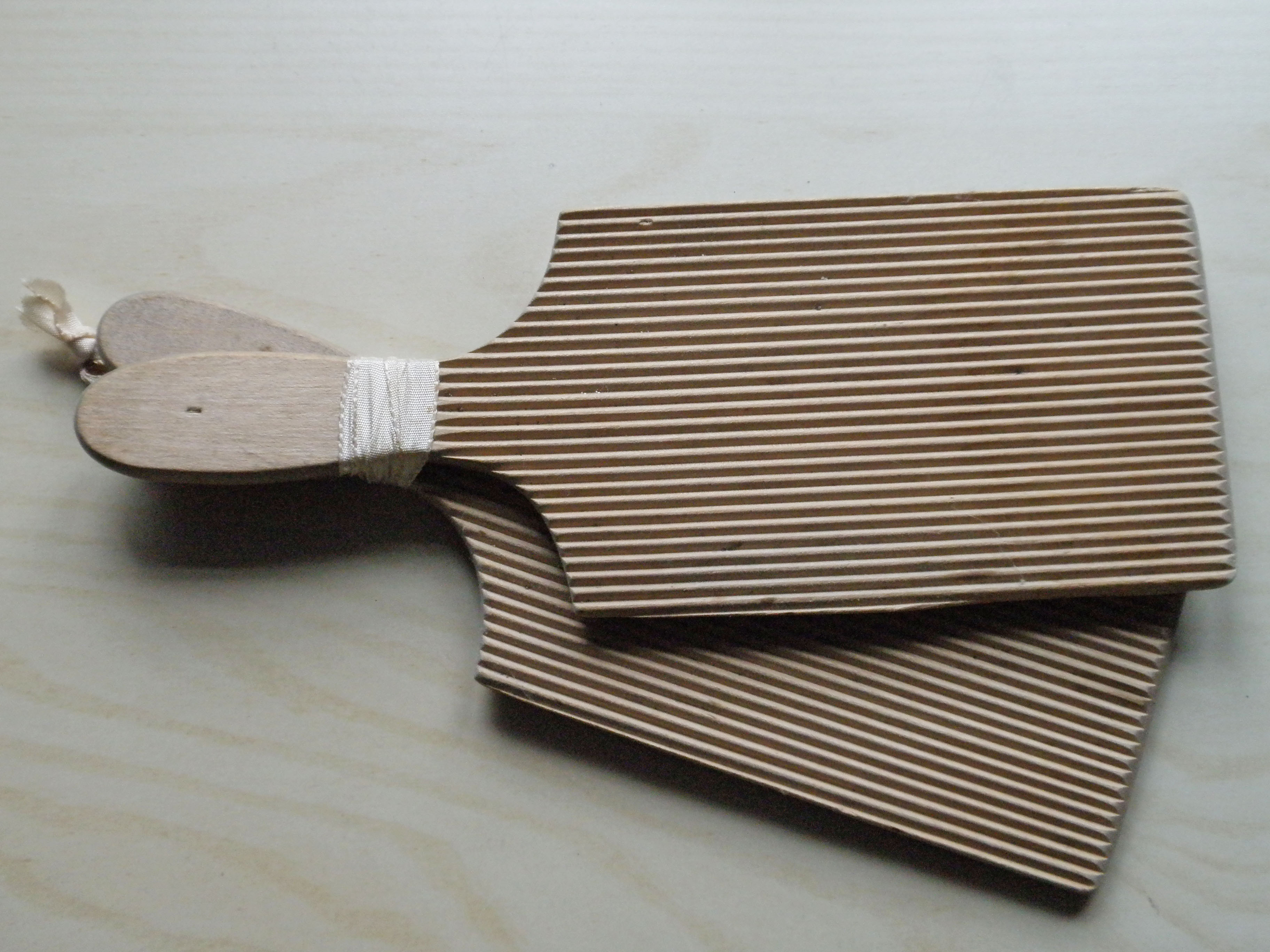
Butter pats

Scotch hands (also known as butter beaters, butter hands, butter workers or butter pats) are wooden spatulas used when making butter. They are used to press freshly churned butter to remove the watery buttermilk during the butter finishing process known as working, as well as to distribute salt through the butter. Removing the buttermilk and adding salt helps to prevent rancidity in finished butter. One side of the paddle will be ribbed or grooved to allow the buttermilk to drain away from the butter during pressing. The ungrooved side may be used for shaping the butter into final form. The highest quality Scotch hands are made out of sycamore wood, but they can also be made out of metal.

Scotch hands and other butter working tools can be found in ethnographic museums.

Newer versions are used by some small-scale and home butter makers.
