= Butter =

Dairy product

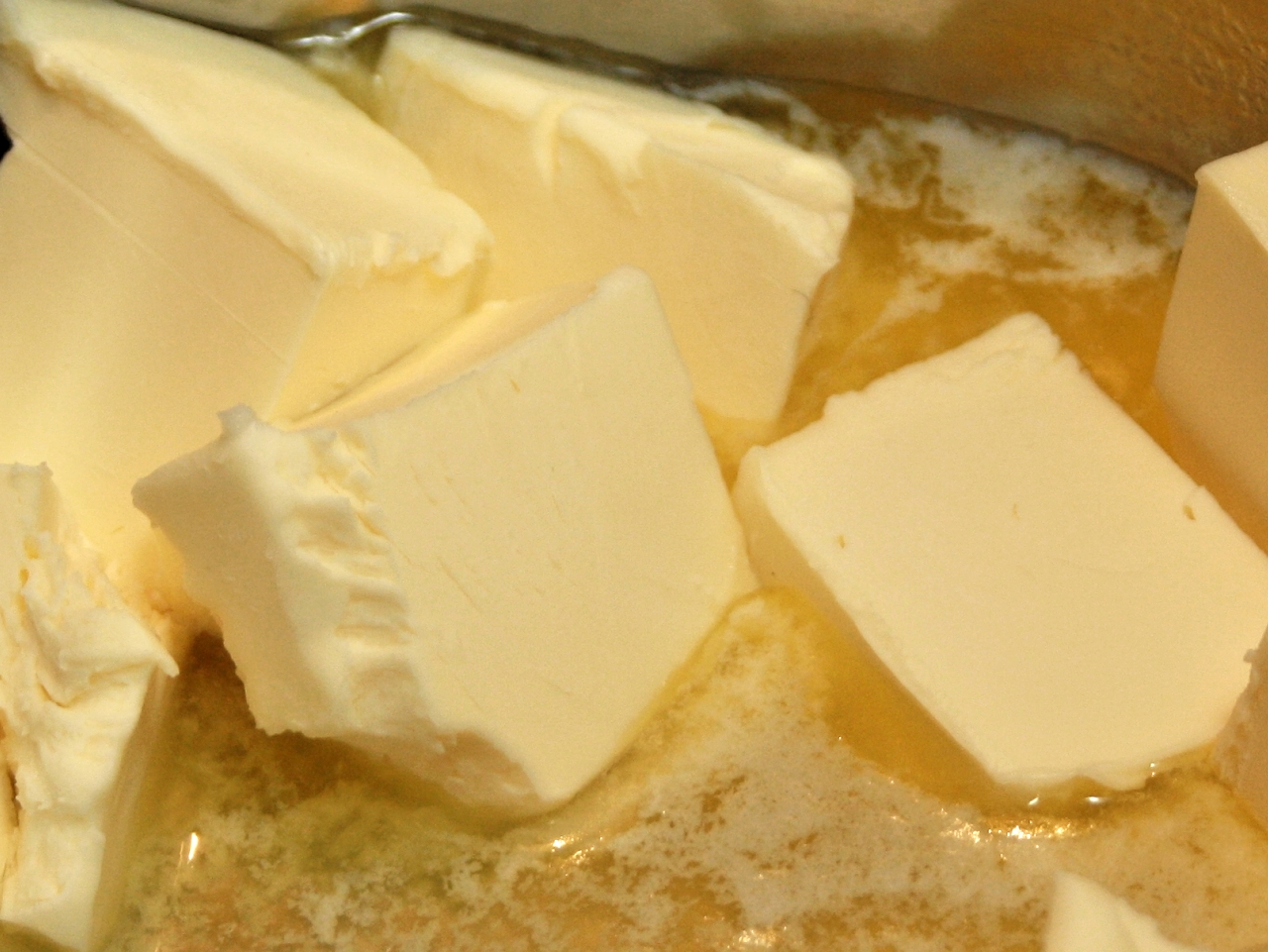
Solid and melted butter

Butter is a dairy product made from the fat and protein components of churned cream. It is a semi-solid emulsion at room temperature, consisting of approximately 81% butterfat. It is used at room temperature as a spread, melted as a condiment, and used as a fat in baking, sauce-making, pan frying, and other cooking procedures.

Most frequently made from cow's milk, butter can also be manufactured from the milk of other mammals, including sheep, goats, buffalo, and yaks. It is made by churning milk or cream to separate the fat globules from the buttermilk. Salt has been added to butter since antiquity to help preserve it, particularly when being transported; salt may still play a preservation role but is less important today as the entire supply chain is usually refrigerated. In modern times, salt may be added for taste and food coloring for color. Rendering butter, removing the water and milk solids, produces clarified butter (including ghee), which is almost entirely butterfat.

Butter is a gel. Butter remains a firm solid when refrigerated but softens to a spreadable consistency at room temperature and melts to a thin liquid consistency at 32 to 35 °C (90 to 95 °F). The density of butter is 911 g/L (15 1/4 oz/US pt). It generally has a pale yellow color but varies from deep yellow to nearly white. Its natural, unmodified color is dependent on the source animal's feed and genetics, but the commercial manufacturing process sometimes alters this with food colorings like annatto or carotene.

In 2023, world production of butter made from cow milk was six million tonnes, led by the United States, with 16% of the total.

== Etymology ==
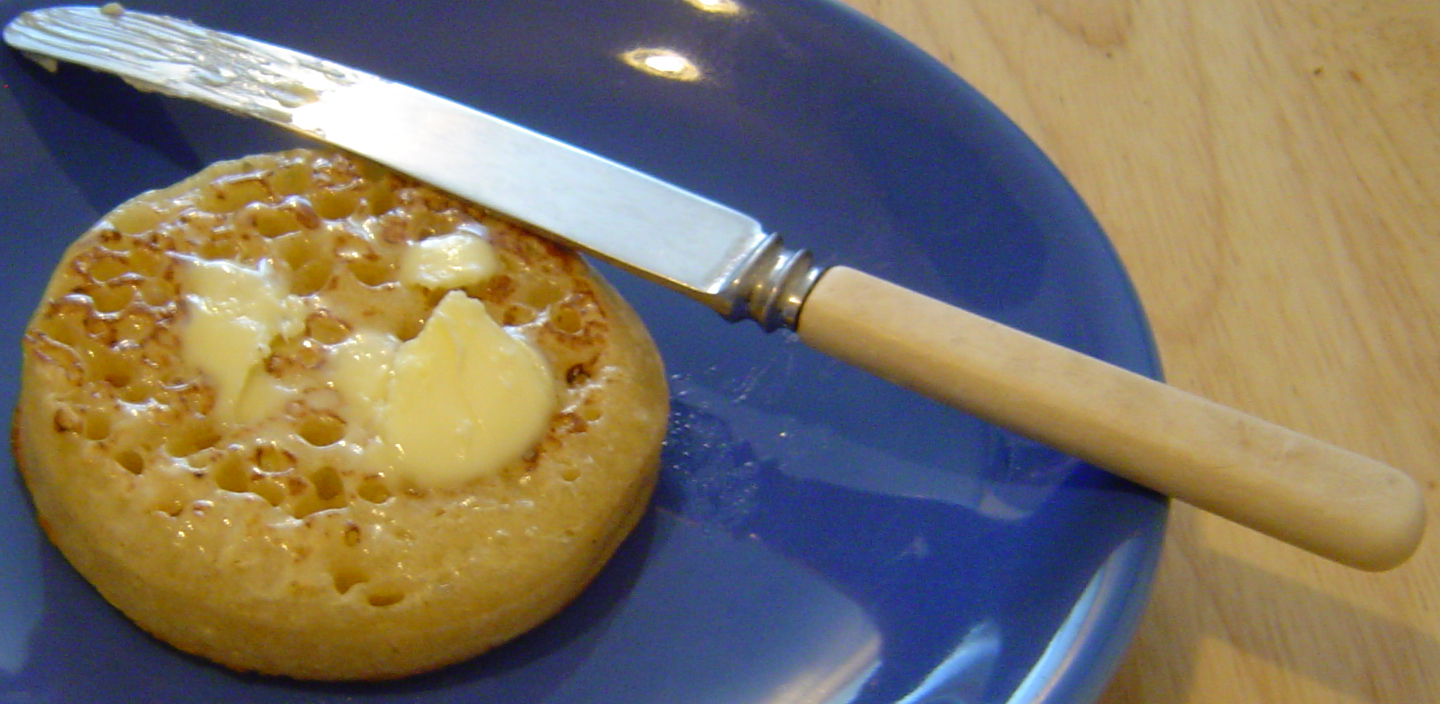
Butter spread on a crumpet using a butter knife

The word butter derives (via Germanic languages) from the Latin butyrum, which is the latinisation of the Greek βούτυρον (bouturon) and βούτυρος. This may be a compound of βοῦς (bous), "ox, cow" + τυρός (turos), "cheese", that is "cow-cheese". The word turos ("cheese") is attested in Mycenaean Greek. The Latinized form is found in the name butyric acid, a compound found in rancid butter and other dairy products.

== Manufacturing and composition ==
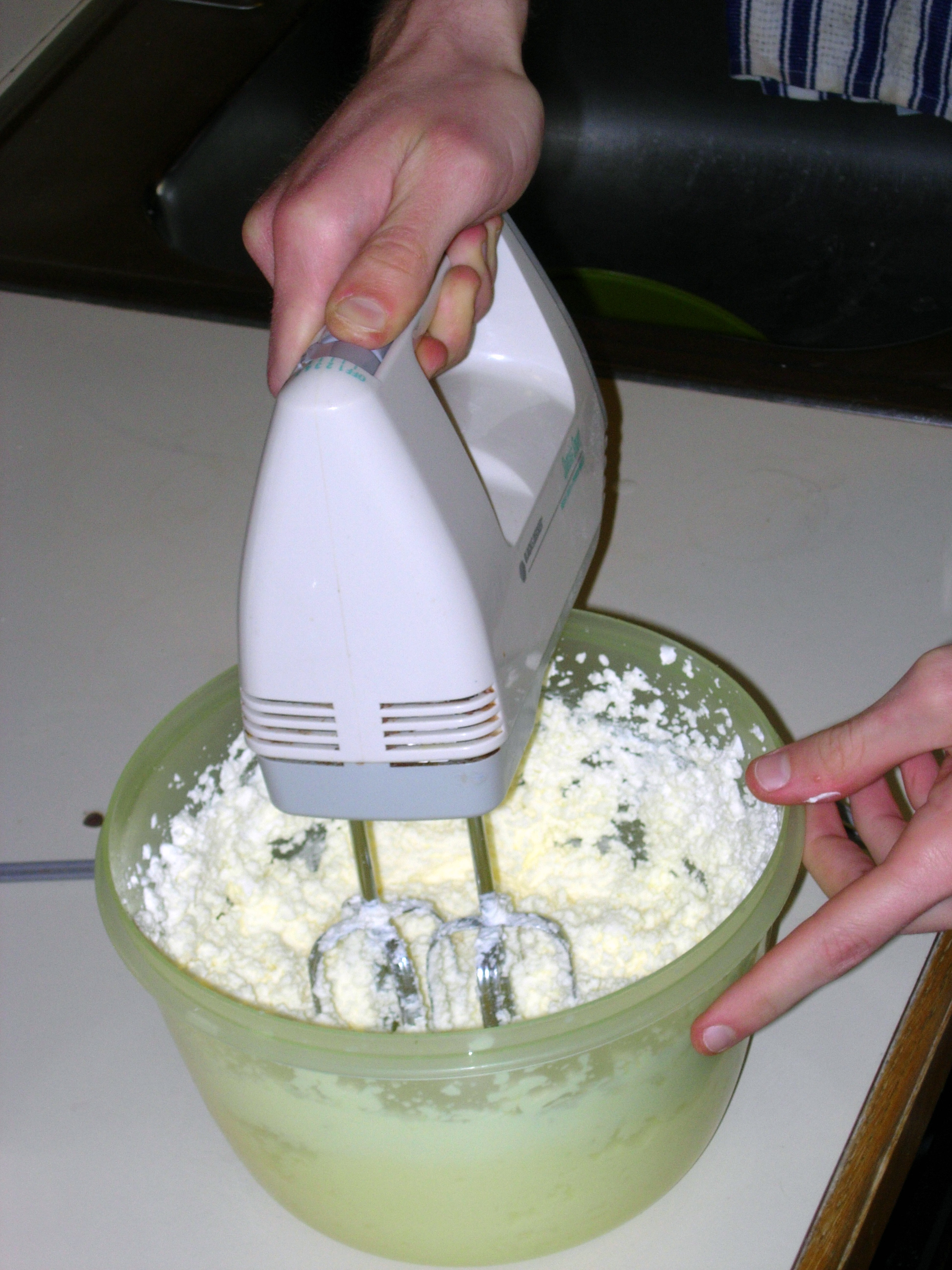
Churning cream into butter using a hand-held mixer

Unhomogenized milk and cream contain butterfat in microscopic globules. These globules are surrounded by membranes made of phospholipids (fatty acid emulsifiers) and proteins, which prevent the fat in milk from pooling together into a single mass. Butter is produced by agitating cream, which damages these membranes and allows the milk fats to conjoin, separating from the other parts of the cream. Variations in the production method will create butters with different consistencies, mostly due to the butterfat composition in the finished product. Butter contains fat in three separate forms: free butterfat, butterfat crystals, and undamaged fat globules. In the finished product, different proportions of these forms result in different consistencies within the butter; butters with many crystals are harder than butters dominated by free fats.

Churning produces small butter grains floating in the water-based portion of the cream. This watery liquid was traditionally called buttermilk (although modern commercial buttermilk is instead directly fermented skimmed milk.) The buttermilk is drained off; sometimes more buttermilk is removed by rinsing the grains with water. Then the grains are "worked": pressed and kneaded together. When prepared manually, this is done using wooden boards called scotch hands. This consolidates the butter into a solid mass and breaks up embedded pockets of buttermilk or water into tiny droplets.

Commercial butter is about 80% butterfat and 15% water; traditionally-made butter may have as little as 65% fat and 30% water. Butterfat is a mixture of triglyceride, a triester derived from glycerol, and three of any of several fatty acid groups. Triglycerides are about 97% of the fat in milk.

Annatto is sometimes added by U.S. butter manufacturers without declaring it on the label because the U.S. allows butter to have an undisclosed flavorless and natural coloring agent (whereas all other foods in the U.S. must label coloring agents). The preservative lactic acid is sometimes added instead of salt (and as a flavor enhancer), and sometimes additional diacetyl is added to boost the buttery flavor (in the U.S., both ingredients can be listed simply as "natural flavors"). When used together in the NIZO manufacturing method, these two flavorings produce the flavor of cultured butter without actually fully fermenting.

== Types ==
Chart of milk products and production relationships, including butter

Before modern factory butter making, cream was usually collected from several milkings and was therefore several days old and somewhat fermented by the time it was made into butter. Butter made in this traditional way (from a fermented cream) is known as cultured butter. During fermentation, the cream naturally sours as bacteria convert milk sugars into lactic acid. The fermentation process produces additional aroma compounds, including diacetyl, which makes for a fuller-flavored and more "buttery" tasting product.

Butter made from fresh cream is called sweet cream butter. Production of sweet cream butter first became common in the 19th century, when the development of refrigeration and the mechanical milk separator made sweet cream butter faster and cheaper to produce at scale (sweet cream butter can be made in 6 hours, whereas cultured butter can take up to 72 hours to make).

Cultured butter is preferred throughout continental Europe, while sweet cream butter dominates in the United States and the United Kingdom. Chef Jansen Chan, the director of pastry operations at the International Culinary Center in Manhattan, says, "It's no secret that dairy in France and most of Europe is higher quality than most of the U.S." The combination of butter culturing, the 82% butterfat minimum (as opposed to the 80% minimum in the U.S.), and the fact that French butter is grass-fed, accounts for why French pastry (and French food in general) has a reputation for being richer-tasting and flakier. Cultured butter is sometimes labeled "European-style" butter in the United States, although cultured butter is made and sold by some, especially Amish, dairies.

Milk that is to be made into butter is usually pasteurized during production to kill pathogenic bacteria and other microbes. Butter made from unpasteurized raw milk is very rare and can be dangerous. Commercial raw milk products are not legal to sell through interstate commerce in the United States and are very rare in Europe. Raw cream butter is not usually available for purchase.

=== Clarified butter ===
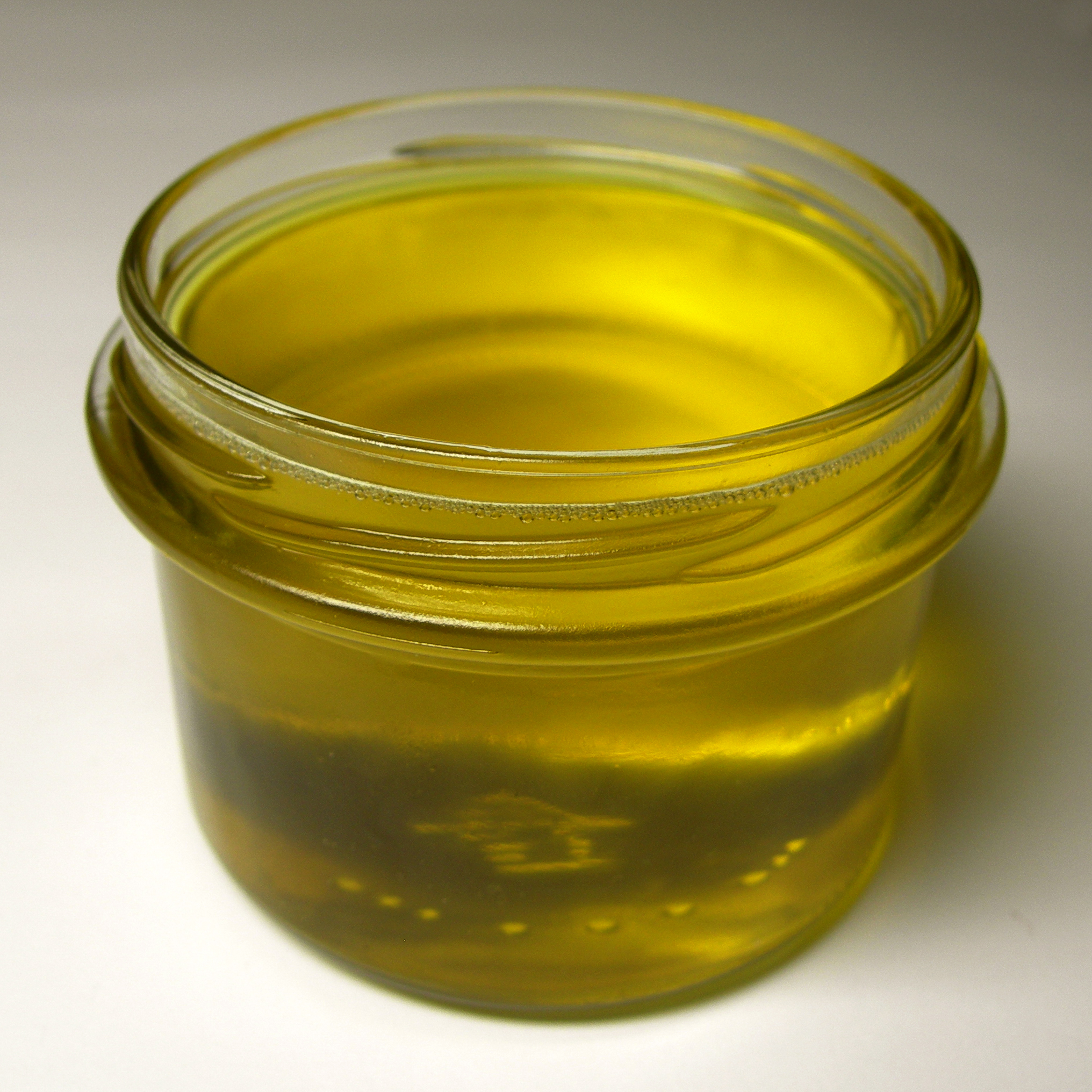
Liquid clarified butter

Clarified butter has almost all of its water and milk solids removed, leaving almost-pure butterfat. Clarified butter is made by heating butter to its melting point and then allowing it to cool; after settling, the remaining components separate by density. At the top, whey proteins form a skin, which is removed. The resulting butterfat is then poured off from the mixture of water and casein proteins that settle to the bottom.

Ghee is clarified butter that has been heated to around 120 °C (250 °F) after the water evaporated, turning the milk solids brown. This process flavors the ghee, and also produces antioxidants that help protect it from rancidity. Because of this, ghee can be kept for six to eight months under normal conditions.

=== Whey butter ===
Cream may be separated (usually by a centrifuge or a sedimentation) from whey instead of milk, as a byproduct of cheese-making. Whey butter may be made from whey cream. Whey cream and butter have a lower fat content and taste more salty, tangy and "cheesy". They are also cheaper to make than "sweet" cream and butter. The fat content of whey is low, so a thousand units mass of whey will typically yield only three units of butter.

=== Indian white butter ===
Indian white butter (locally called Makkhan), is a cultured, fermented, unsalted butter. It is made by churning cream, and blending it with ice and cold water. This separates the solid fat (butter) from the aqueous components (buttermilk). White butter is usually made with buffalo milk or milk from grain-fed cows. This is because the β-carotene and other pigments typically present in pasture-fed cow milk will turn the butter yellow. Buffalos are very efficient at converting dietary β-carotene to vitamin A before the pigment reaches the milk, unlike most cattle species.

=== Protected-origin butters ===
Several butters have protected geographical indications; these include:

- Beurre d'Ardenne, from Belgium
- Beurre d'Isigny, from France
- Beurre Charentes-Poitou (which also includes: Beurre des Charentes and Beurre des Deux-Sèvres under the same classification), from France
- Beurre Rose, from Luxembourg
- Mantequilla de Soria, from Spain
- Mantega de l'Alt Urgell i la Cerdanya, from Spain
- Rucava white butter (Rucavas baltais sviests), from Latvia

== History ==
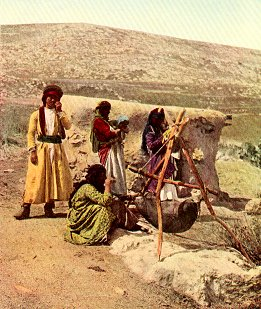
Traditional butter-making in Palestine. Ancient techniques were still practiced in the early 20th century. Source: National Geographic, March 1914.

Elaine Khosrova traces the invention of butter back to the Neolithic era;. it is known to have existed in the Near East following the development of herding. A later Sumerian tablet, dating to approximately 2,500 B.C., describes the butter making process, from the milking of cattle, while contemporary Sumerian tablets identify butter as a ritual offering.

In the Mediterranean climate, unclarified butter spoils quickly, unlike cheese, so it is not a practical method of preserving the nutrients of milk. The ancient Greeks and Romans seemed to use the butter only as unguent and medicine and considered it as a food of the barbarians. A play by the Greek comic poet Anaxandrides refers to Thracians as boutyrophagoi, "butter-eaters". In his Natural History, Pliny the Elder calls butter "the most delicate of food among barbarous nations" and goes on to describe its medicinal properties. Later, the physician Galen also described butter as a medicinal agent only.

=== Middle Ages ===
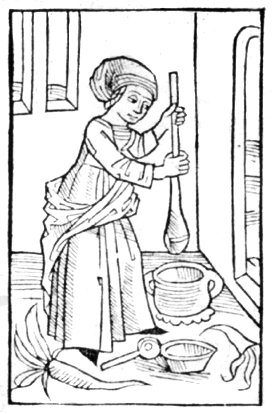
Woman churning butter; Compost et Kalendrier des Bergères, Paris 1499

In the cooler climates of northern Europe, butter could be stored longer before it spoiled. Scandinavia has the oldest tradition in Europe of butter export, dating at least to the 12th century. After the fall of Rome and through much of the Middle Ages, butter was a common food across most of Europe, but had a low reputation, and so was consumed principally by peasants. Butter slowly became more accepted by the upper class, notably when the Roman Catholic Church allowed its consumption during Lent from the early 16th century. Bread and butter became common fare among the middle class and the English, in particular, gained a reputation for their liberal use of melted butter as a sauce with meat and vegetables.

In antiquity, butter was used for fuel in lamps, as a substitute for oil. The Butter Tower of Rouen Cathedral was erected in the early 16th century when Archbishop Georges d'Amboise authorized the burning of butter during Lent, instead of oil, which was scarce at the time.

Across northern Europe, butter was sometimes packed into barrels (firkins) and buried in peat bogs, perhaps for years. Such "bog butter" would develop a strong flavor as it aged, but remain edible, in large part because of the cool, airless, antiseptic and acidic environment of a peat bog. Firkins of such buried butter are a common archaeological find in Ireland; the National Museum of Ireland – Archaeology has some containing "a grayish cheese-like substance, partially hardened, not much like butter, and quite free from putrefaction." The practice was most common in Ireland in the 11th to 14th centuries; it had ended entirely before the 19th century.

=== Industrialization ===
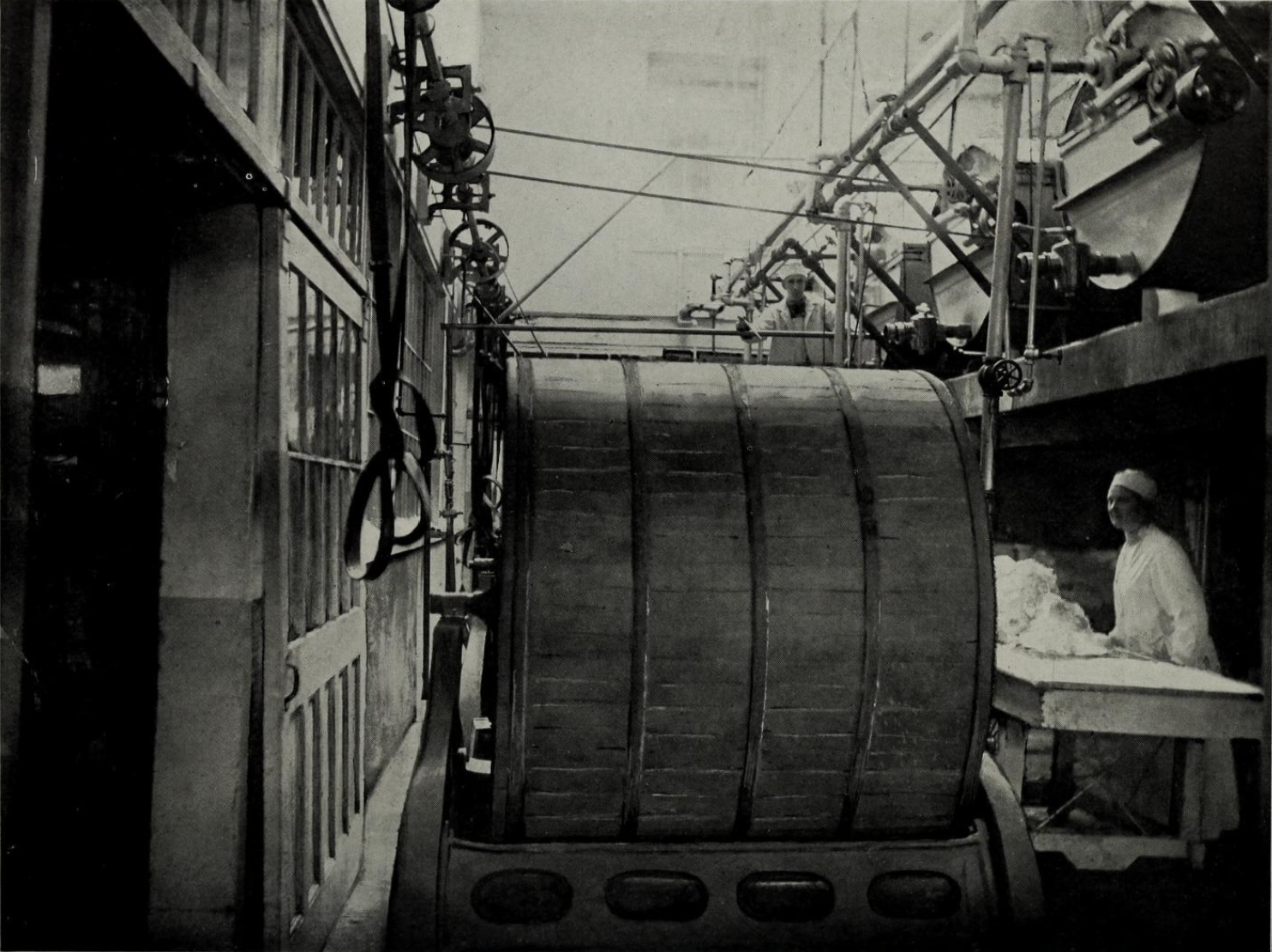
Early 20th century industrial butter churning

Until the 19th century, the vast majority of butter was made by hand, on farms, for farm family use or to sell. They used wood presses with carved decoration identifying the producer to press butter into pucks or small bricks to sell at nearby markets or general stores. This practice continued until production was mechanized and butter was produced in less decorative stick form.

Like Ireland, France became well known for its butter, particularly in Normandy and Brittany. Butter consumption in London in the mid-1840s was estimated at 15,357 tons annually.

The first butter factories appeared in the United States in the early 1860s, after the successful introduction of cheese factories a decade earlier. In the late 1870s, the centrifugal cream separator was introduced, marketed most successfully by Swedish engineer Carl Gustaf Patrik de Laval.

By the late nineteenth century, butter was sometimes colored to achieve a consistent yellow appearance, particularly in winter months when natural pigmentation from cattle feed was lower. Both natural colorants and later synthetic coal-tar dyes were used by dairy producers to standardize color for commercial sale.

In 1920, Otto Hunziker wrote The Butter Industry, Prepared for Factory, School and Laboratory; three editions were printed, in 1920, 1927, and 1940. As part of the efforts of the American Dairy Science Association, Hunziker and others published articles regarding: causes of tallowiness (an odor defect, distinct from rancidity, a taste defect); mottles (an aesthetic issue related to uneven color); introduced salts; the effect of creamery metals and liquids; and acidity measurement. These and other ADSA publications helped standardize practices internationally.

=== Alternatives ===
Butter consumption declined in most western nations during the 20th century, mainly because of the rising popularity of margarine, which is less expensive and, until recent years, was perceived as being healthier. In the United States, margarine consumption overtook butter during the 1950s, and it is still the case today that more margarine than butter is eaten in the U.S. and the EU.

Butter production (cow milk) 2023, tonnes
United States	957,773
Germany	468,880
New Zealand	462,400
France	403,970
Russia	301,223
Ireland	299,300
World	5,983,836
Source: FAOSTAT of the United Nations

== Production ==
In 2023, world production of butter made from cow milk was six million tonnes, led by the United States with 16% of the total, and Germany, New Zealand, and France as secondary producers (table).

Yearly per capita supply of butter and ghee

== Storage ==
Normal butter softens to a spreadable consistency around 15 °C (60 °F), well above refrigerator temperatures. The "butter compartment" found in many refrigerators may be one of the warmer sections inside, but it still leaves butter quite hard. Until recently, many refrigerators sold in New Zealand featured a "butter conditioner", a compartment kept warmer than the rest of the refrigerator—but still cooler than room temperature—with a small heater. Keeping butter tightly wrapped delays rancidity, which is hastened by exposure to light or air, and also helps prevent it from picking up other odors. Wrapped butter has a shelf life of several months at refrigerator temperatures. Butter can also be frozen to extend its storage life. Before the advent of refrigeration, methods were sought to "cure" the butter so that it would last for an extended time before spoilage.

=== Packaging ===
In most countries butter is sold in packets by weight, often in 250 g (8.8 oz) and 500 g (18 oz) packages.

==== Bulk packaging ====
Since the 1940s, but more commonly the 1960s, butter pats have been individually wrapped and packed in cardboard boxes. Prior to use of cardboard, butter was bulk packed in wood. The earliest discoveries used firkins. From about 1882 wooden boxes were used, as the introduction of refrigeration on ships allowed longer transit times. Butter boxes were generally made with woods whose resin would not taint the butter, such as sycamore, kahikatea, hoop pine, maple, or spruce. They commonly weighed a firkin (56 pounds (25 kg)).

==== United States ====
In the United States, butter has traditionally been made into small, rectangular blocks by means of a pair of wooden butter paddles. It is usually produced in four-ounce (1/4 lb; 110 g) sticks that are individually wrapped in waxed or foiled paper, sold in one-pound (0.45 kg) packages of four sticks. This practice is believed to have originated in 1907, when Swift and Company began packaging butter in this manner for mass distribution. Due to historical differences in butter printers (machines that cut and package butter), four-ounce sticks are commonly produced in two different shapes:

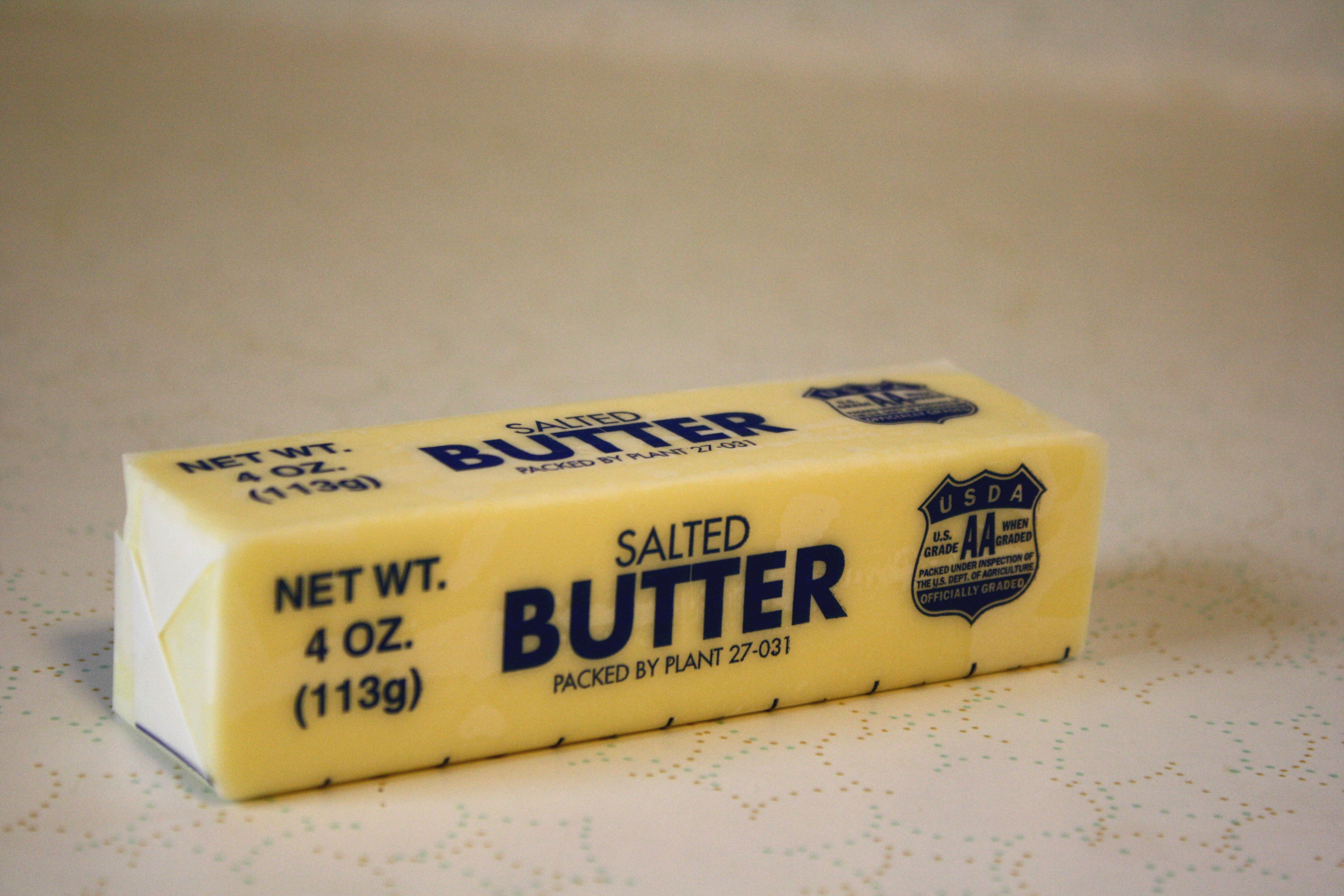
Eastern-pack shape salted butter

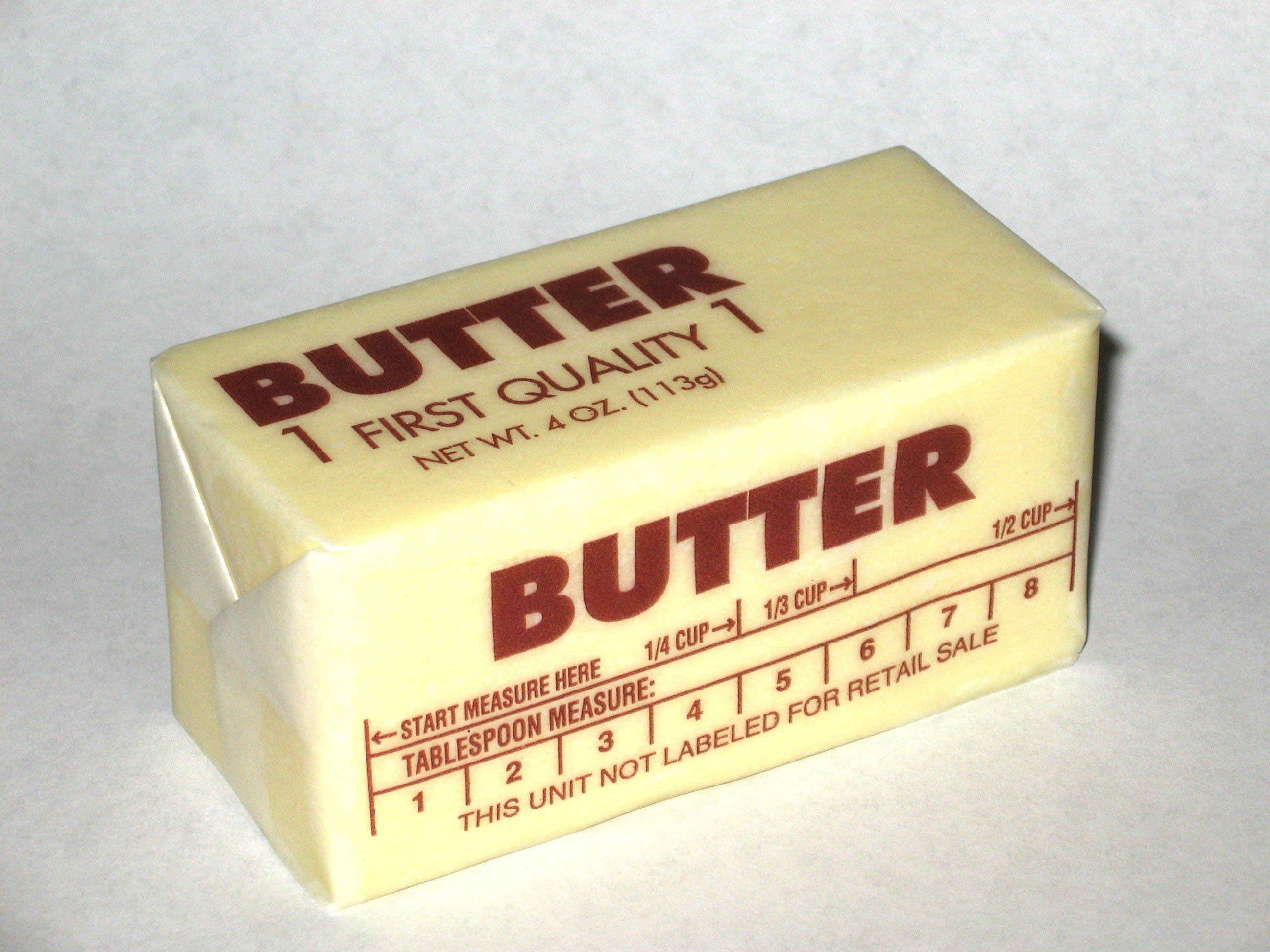
Western-pack shape unsalted butter

- The dominant shape east of the Rocky Mountains is the Elgin, or eastern-pack, shape, named for a dairy in Elgin, Illinois. The sticks measure 4 3/4 by 1 1/4 by 1 1/4 inches (121 mm × 32 mm × 32 mm) and are typically sold stacked two by two in elongated rectangular boxes. Most US butter dishes are designed for Elgin-style butter sticks.
- West of the Rocky Mountains, butter printers standardized on a different shape, which is now referred to as the western-pack shape. These butter sticks measure 3 1/4 by 1 1/2 by 1 1/2 inches (83 mm × 38 mm × 38 mm) and are usually sold with four sticks packed side-by-side in a flat, rectangular box.

== In cooking and gastronomy ==
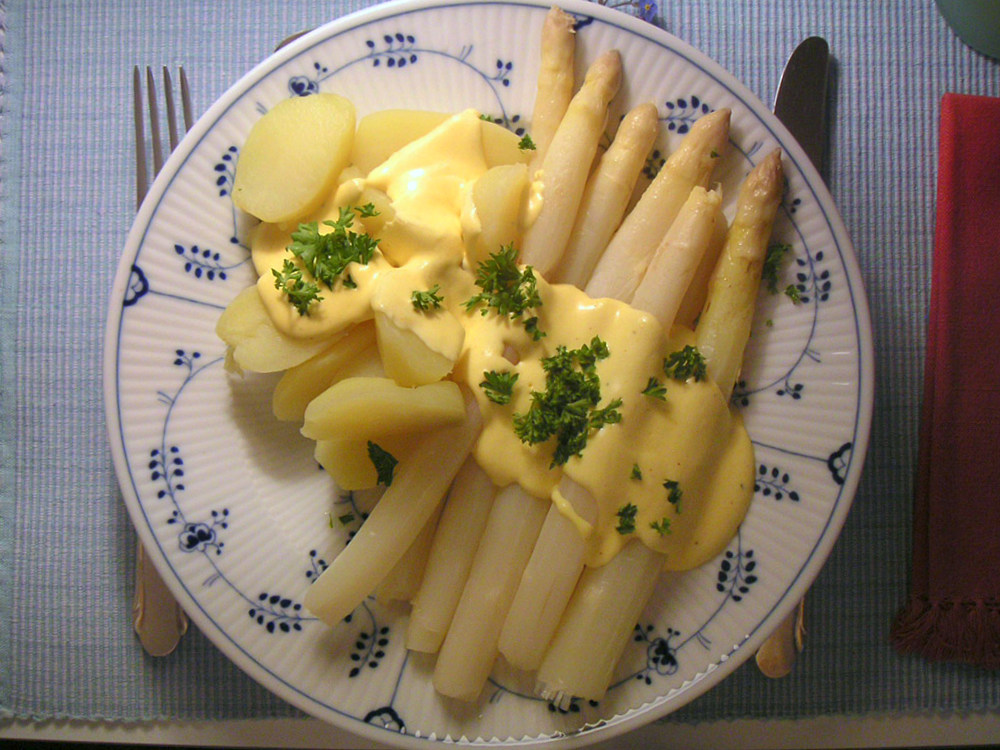
Hollandaise sauce served over white asparagus and potatoes

Butter has been considered indispensable in French cuisine since the 17th century. Chefs and cooks have extolled its importance: Fernand Point said "Donnez-moi du beurre, encore du beurre, toujours du beurre!" ('Give me butter, more butter, still more butter!'). Julia Child said, "With enough butter, anything is good."

Melted butter plays an important role in the preparation of sauces, notably in French cuisine. Beurre noisette (hazelnut butter) and Beurre noir (black butter) are sauces of melted butter cooked until the milk solids and sugars have turned golden or dark brown; they are often finished with an addition of vinegar or lemon juice. Hollandaise and béarnaise sauces are emulsions of egg yolk and melted butter. Hollandaise and béarnaise sauces are stabilized with the powerful emulsifiers in the egg yolks, but butter itself contains enough emulsifiers—mostly remnants of the fat globule membranes—to form a stable emulsion on its own.

Beurre blanc (white butter) is made by whisking butter into reduced vinegar or wine, forming an emulsion with the texture of thick cream. Beurre monté (prepared butter) is melted but still emulsified butter; it lends its name to the practice of "mounting" a sauce with butter: whisking cold butter into any water-based sauce at the end of cooking, giving the sauce a thicker body and a glossy shine—as well as a buttery taste.

Butter is used for sautéing and frying, although its milk solids brown and burn above 150 °C (250 °F)—a rather low temperature for most applications. The smoke point of butterfat is around 200 °C (400 °F), so clarified butter or ghee is better suited to frying.

Butter fills several roles in baking, including making possible a range of textures, making chemical leavenings work better, tenderizing proteins, and enhancing the tastes of other ingredients. It is used in a similar manner to other solid fats like lard, suet, or shortening, but has a flavor that may better complement sweet baked goods.

Compound butters are mixtures of butter and other ingredients used to flavor various dishes.

== Nutrition ==
Butter, salted
Nutritional value per 100 g
- Energy: 717 kcal (3,000 kJ)
- Carbohydrates: 0.06 g
- Sugars: 0.06 g
- Fat: 81.1 g
- Saturated: 51.4 g
- Monounsaturated: 21 g
- Polyunsaturated: 3 g
- Protein: 0.85 g
Vitamins and minerals
Vitamins	Quantity %DV^{†}
Vitamin A equiv.	76% 684 μg
Vitamin B12	7% 0.17 μg
Vitamin E	15% 2.32 mg
Vitamin K	6% 7 μg
Minerals	Quantity %DV^{†}
Calcium	2% 24 mg
Sodium	28% 643 mg
- Other constituents: Quantity
- Water: 16 g
- Cholesterol: 215 mg
- Link to USDA Database entry
- ^{†}Percentages estimated using US recommendations for adults.

Butter (salted during manufacturing) is 18% water, 81% fat, and 1% protein, with negligible carbohydrates. Of the 81 g (2.9 oz) of total fat, saturated fat is 51 g, monounsaturated fat is 21 g, polyunsaturated fat is 3 g, trans fat is 3 g, and trans fat designated as "18:1 t" is 3 g, for a total of 81 g (source for table).

In a reference amount of 100 g (3.5 oz), salted butter supplies 717 calories and 76% of the Daily Value (DV) for vitamin A, 15% DV for vitamin E, and 28% DV for sodium, with no other micronutrients in significant content (table). In 100 grams, salted butter contains 215 mg of cholesterol (table).

=== Lactose ===
As butter is essentially just the milk fat, it contains only traces of lactose, indicating that moderate consumption of butter is unlikely to cause symptoms for lactose intolerant people. People with milk allergies may still need to avoid butter, since it contains enough of the allergy-causing proteins to cause reactions.

Properties of common cooking fats (per 100 g)
Type of fat	Total fat (g)	Saturated fat (g)	Monounsaturated fat (g)	Polyunsaturated fat (g)	Smoke point
Butter	81	51	21	3	150 °C (302 °F)
Canola oil	100	6–7	62–64	24–26	205 °C (401 °F)
Coconut oil	99	83	6	2	177 °C (351 °F)
Corn oil	100	13–14	27–29	52–54	230 °C (446 °F)
Lard	100	39	45	11	190 °C (374 °F)
Peanut oil	100	16	57	20	225 °C (437 °F)
Olive oil	100	13–19	59–74	6–16	190 °C (374 °F)
Rice bran oil	100	25	38	37	250 °C (482 °F)
Soybean oil	100	15	22	57–58	257 °C (495 °F)
Suet	94	52	32	3	200 °C (392 °F)
Ghee	99	62	29	4	204 °C (399 °F)
Sunflower oil	100	10	20	66	225 °C (437 °F)
Sunflower oil (high oleic)	100	12	84	4	
Vegetable shortening	100	25	41	28	165 °C (329 °F)

== Health concerns ==
Replacing plant-based oils such as olive oil or sunflower oil with butter leads to higher levels of (LDL) cholesterol in the blood, as butter contains high amounts of saturated fat. Higher cholesterol levels leads to higher risks of strokes and heart attacks. While direct evidence is somewhat limited as of 2024, it points towards a higher risk of cardiovascular disease and mortality of butter compared to plant-based alternative sources of fat. The NHS in the UK advise people to eat butter less frequently and in small quantities.

Saturated fats further raise the risk of various cancers, such as esophageal cancer and slightly for breast cancer. Direct evidence for butter is sparse, however, and a 2021 meta-analysis of two studies with of over 50,000 individuals did not find a significant increase in cancer. A 2025 study of over 200,000 US individuals showed higher cancer risk in people that ate more butter compared to those eating plant-based oils.

A meta-analysis and systematic review published in 2016 found relatively small or insignificant overall associations of a dose of 14g/day of butter with mortality and cardiovascular disease, and consumption was insignificantly inversely associated with incidence of diabetes. The study states that "findings do not support a need for major emphasis in dietary guidelines on either increasing or decreasing butter consumption."

== Society and culture ==
In the mid-2020s, a viral social media trend emerged of parents feeding their babies butter before bed with claims that it helps them to sleep better. Experts have noted that there is no evidence available to support these claimed benefits and that the safety is unknown with potential for harm.

== See also ==
- List of butter dishes
- List of dairy products
- List of butter sauces
- List of spreads
- Saturated fat and cardiovascular disease
