= Beurre d'Ardenne =

Type of butter made in the Belgian Ardennes

Beurre d’Ardenne (French pronunciation: [bœʁ daʁdɛn]; lit. 'Butter of Ardenne') is a type of butter made in the Ardenne of Belgium from cow's milk.

As a traditional product of the area, it received Belgian appellation d'origine by royal decree in 1984, and received European protected designation of origin status in 1996.

== Production ==
The areas where it is produced are within Wallonia and include the provinces of Luxembourg, Namur and Liège.

To qualify, production must take place entirely in those areas, from milking of the cows, through to churning and, final maturation of the butter, and may be made by churning milk, cream or a mixture of both. The final product must be of at least 82% butterfat and butyric acid.
