= Churning (butter) =

Process of making butter

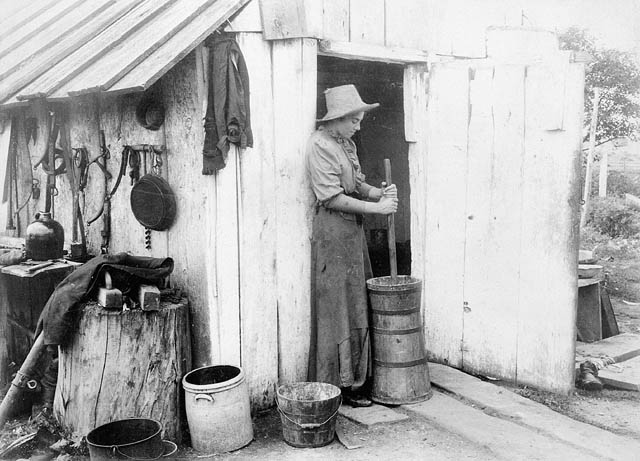
Canadian farm girl churning butter, 1893.

Churning is the process of shaking up cream or whole milk to make butter, usually using a device called butter churn. In Europe from the Middle Ages until the Industrial Revolution, a churn was usually as simple as a barrel with a plunger in it, moved by hand. These have mostly been replaced by mechanical churns.

Butter is essentially the fat of milk. It is usually made from sweet cream (that is, cream skimmed from milk rather than from whey). In Canada, Ireland, Italy, the Nordic countries, the USA, and the UK, salt is usually added to it. Unsalted (sweet) butters are most commonly used in the rest of Europe. It can also be made from acidulated or bacteriologically soured cream. Well into the 19th century butter was still made from cream that had been allowed to stand and sour naturally. The cream was then skimmed from the top of the milk and poured into a wooden tub.

Buttermaking was done by hand in butter churns. The natural souring process is a very sensitive one and infection by foreign microorganisms often spoiled the result. Today's commercial butter making is a product of the knowledge and experience gained over the years in such matters as hygiene, bacterial acidifying and heat treatment, as well as the rapid technical development that has led to the advanced machinery now used. The commercial cream separator was introduced at the end of the 19th century, the continuous churn had been commercialized by the middle of the 20th century.

== Process ==
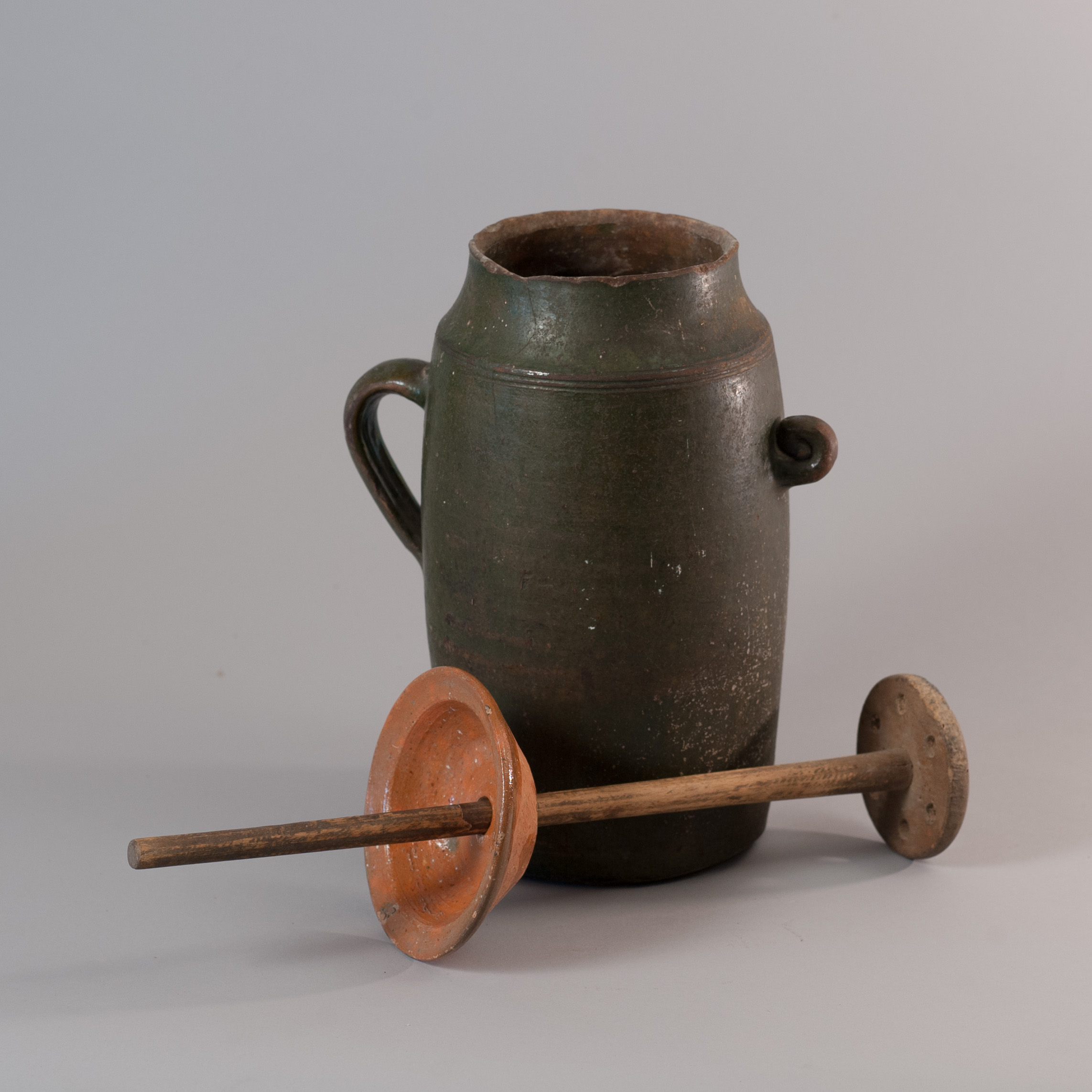
Butter churner pot

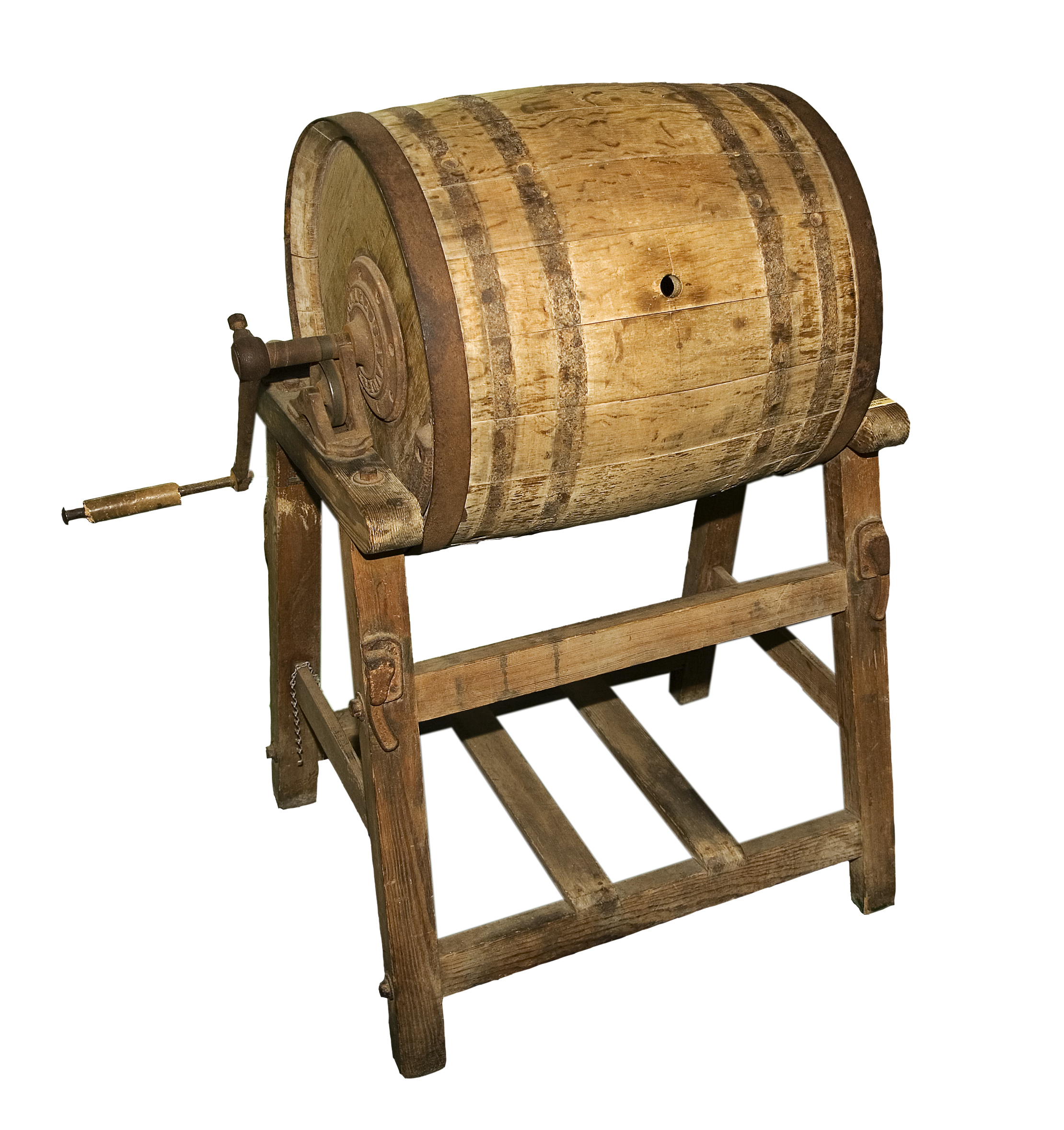
A barrel-type butter churn.

Changing whole milk to butter is a process of transforming a fat-in-water emulsion (milk) to a water-in-fat emulsion (butter). Whole milk is a dilute emulsion of tiny fat globules surrounded by lipoprotein membranes that keep the fat globules separate from one another.

Butter is made from cream that has been separated from whole milk and then cooled; fat droplets clump more easily when hard rather than soft. Better buttermaking also depends upon other factors, such as the fat content of the cream and its acidity.

The process has three steps:

1. Churning physically agitates the cream until it ruptures the fragile membranes surrounding the milk fat. Once broken, the fat droplets can join with each other and form clumps of fat.
2. As churning continues, larger clusters of fat collect until they begin to form a network with the air bubbles that are generated by the churning; this traps the liquid and produces foam. As the fat clumps increase in size, there are also fewer to enclose the air cells. So the bubbles pop, run together, and the foam begins to leak. This leakage is called buttermilk.
3. The cream separates into butter and buttermilk. The buttermilk is drained off, and the remaining butter is kneaded to form a network of fat crystals that becomes the continuous phase, or dispersion medium, of a water-in-fat emulsion. Working the butter also creates its desired smoothness. Eventually, the water droplets become so finely dispersed in the fat that butter’s texture seems dry. Then it is frozen into cubes, then melted, then frozen again into bigger chunks to sell.

== Types ==
Butter churns have varied over time as technology and materials have changed.

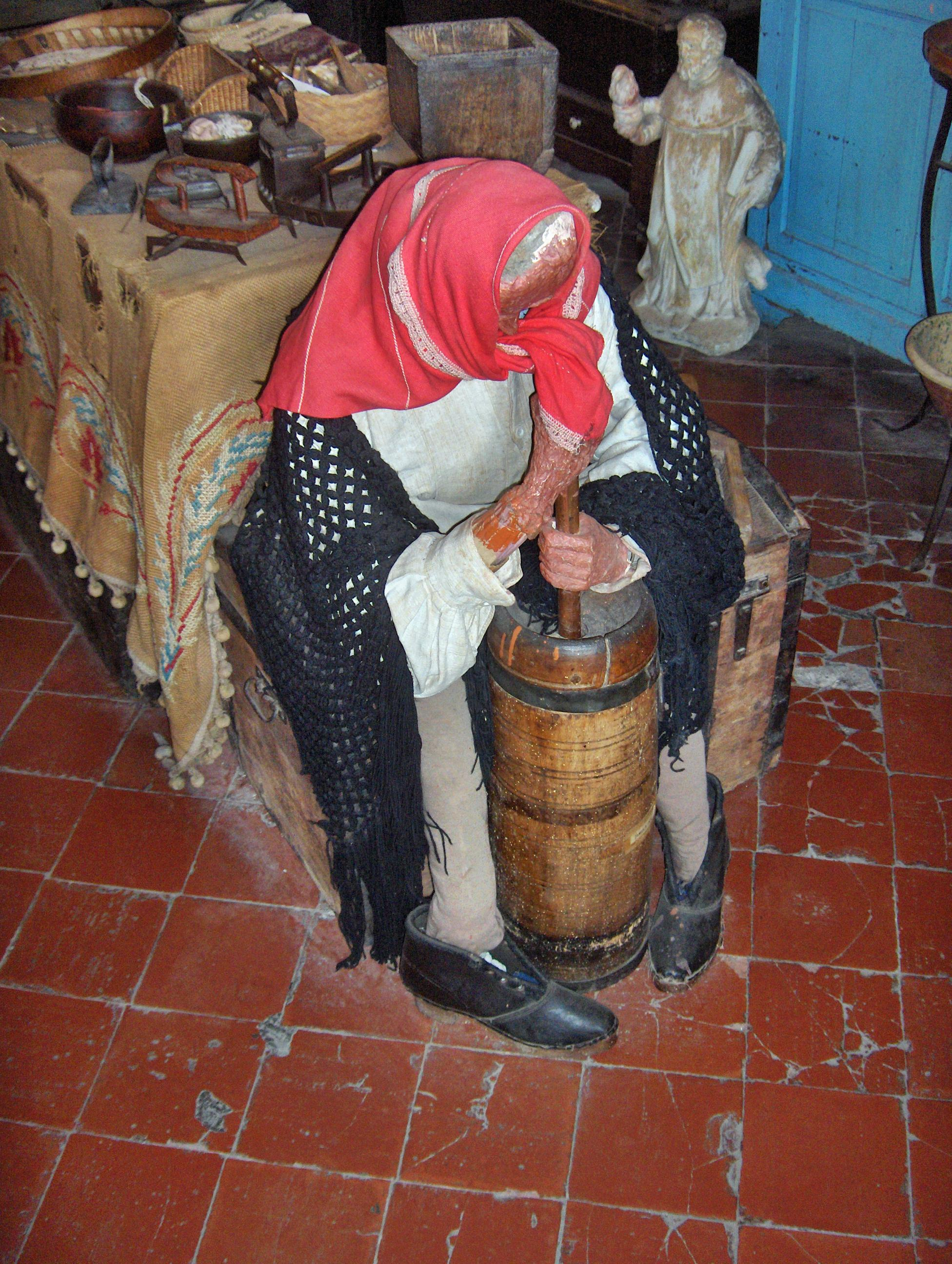
Churn with plunger Ethnographic Museum of Western Liguria, Cervo, Italy

1. Butter was first made by placing the cream in a container made from animal material and shaking until the milk has broken down into butter. Later wood, glass, ceramic or metal containers were used.
2. The first butter churns used a wooden container and a plunger to agitate the cream until butter formed.
3. Later butter churns used a container made from wood, ceramics or galvanized (zinc coated) iron that contained paddles. The hand-turned paddles were moved through the cream quickly, breaking the cream up by mixing it with air. This allows the butter to be made faster than by simply agitating the cream.
4. Centrifugal cream separators allow the properties of centrifuge to be applied to butter making. Instead of having spinning paddles, the paddles are fixed and the container spins. This allows better separation of the butter from the buttermilk and water.

Small batches of butter can be churned at home by hand with the use of a decent-sized container, such as a Mason jar.

With electric mixers and food processors commonly available in most household kitchens, people can make butter in their own homes without a large churn. These small appliances are used to mix the cream until it is close to forming solid butter. This mixture is then mixed by hand to remove the buttermilk and water.

== Historical reference ==
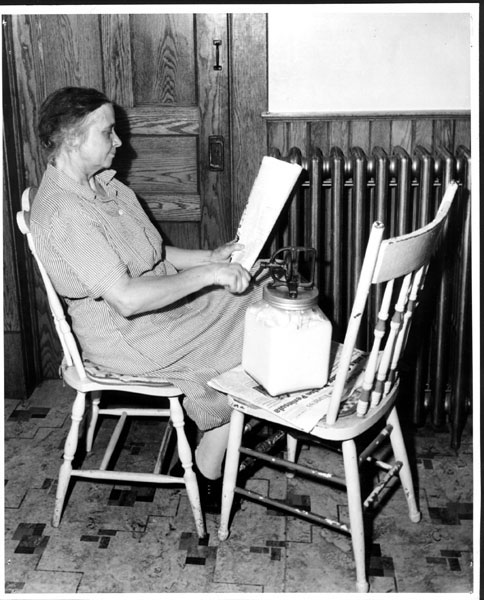
Churning butter (photo taken in 1944)

The Household Cyclopedia of 1881 instructs:

Let the cream be at the temperature of 55° to 60°, by a Fahrenheit thermometer; this is very important. If the weather be cold put boiling water into the churn for half an hour before you want to use it; when that is poured off strain in the cream through a buttered cloth. When the butter is coming, which is easily ascertained by the sound, take off the lid, and with a small, flat board scrape down the sides of the churn, and do the same to the lid: this prevents waste. When the butter has come the butter-milk is to be poured off and spring water put into the churn, and turned for two or three minutes; this is to be then poured away and fresh added, and again the handle turned for a minute or two. Should there be the least milkiness when this is poured from the churn, more must be put in. The butter is then to be placed on a board or marble slab and salted to taste; then with a cream cloth, wrung out in spring water, press all the moisture from it. When dry and firm make it up into rolls with flat boards. The whole process should be completed in three-quarters of an hour. In hot weather pains must be taken to keep the cream from reaching too high a heat. If the dairy be not cool enough, keep the cream-pot in the coldest water you can get; make the butter early in the morning, and place cold water in the churn for a while before it is used.

== See also ==
- Butter churning in Nepal
