= Asín tibuok =

Filipino artisanal salt

Asín tibuók
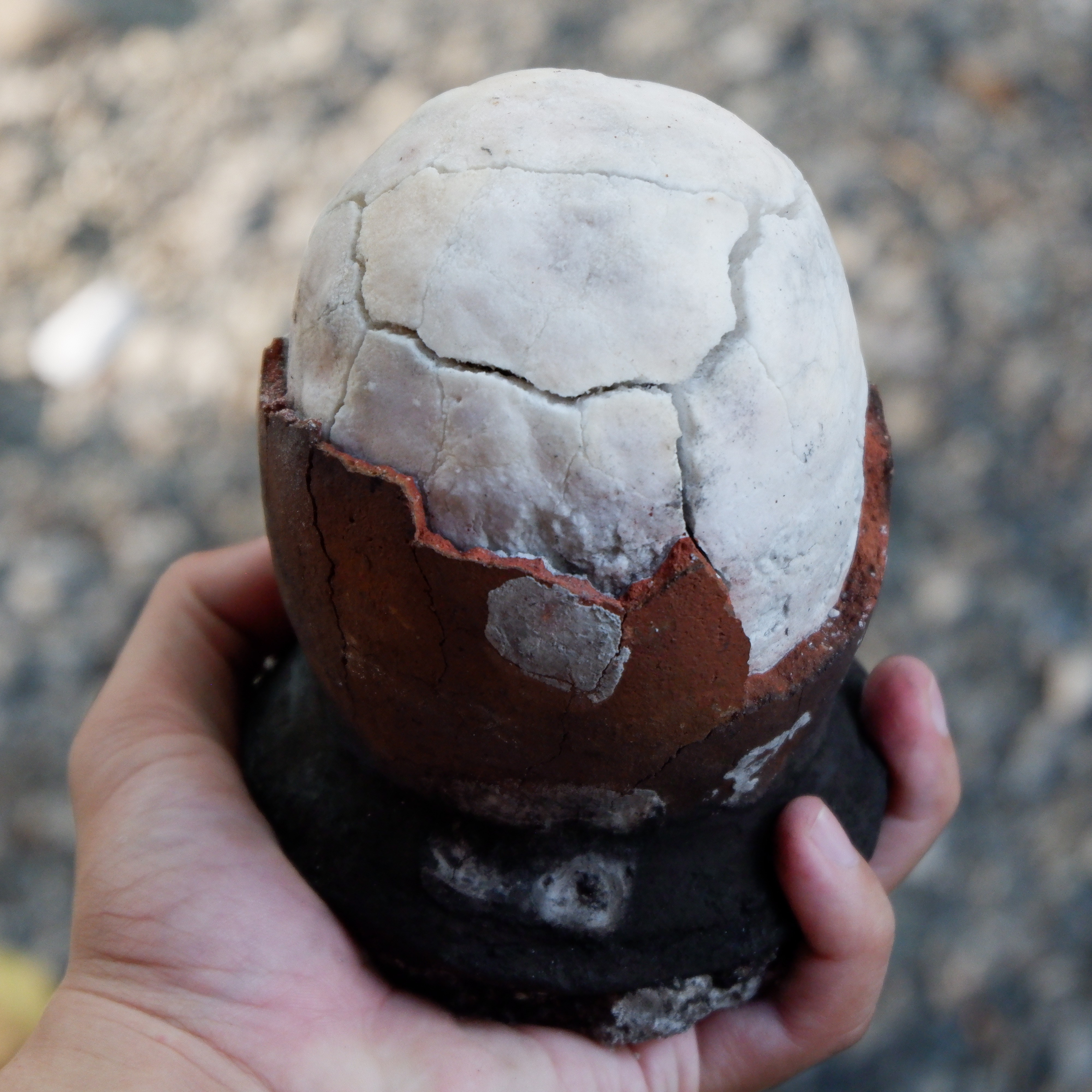
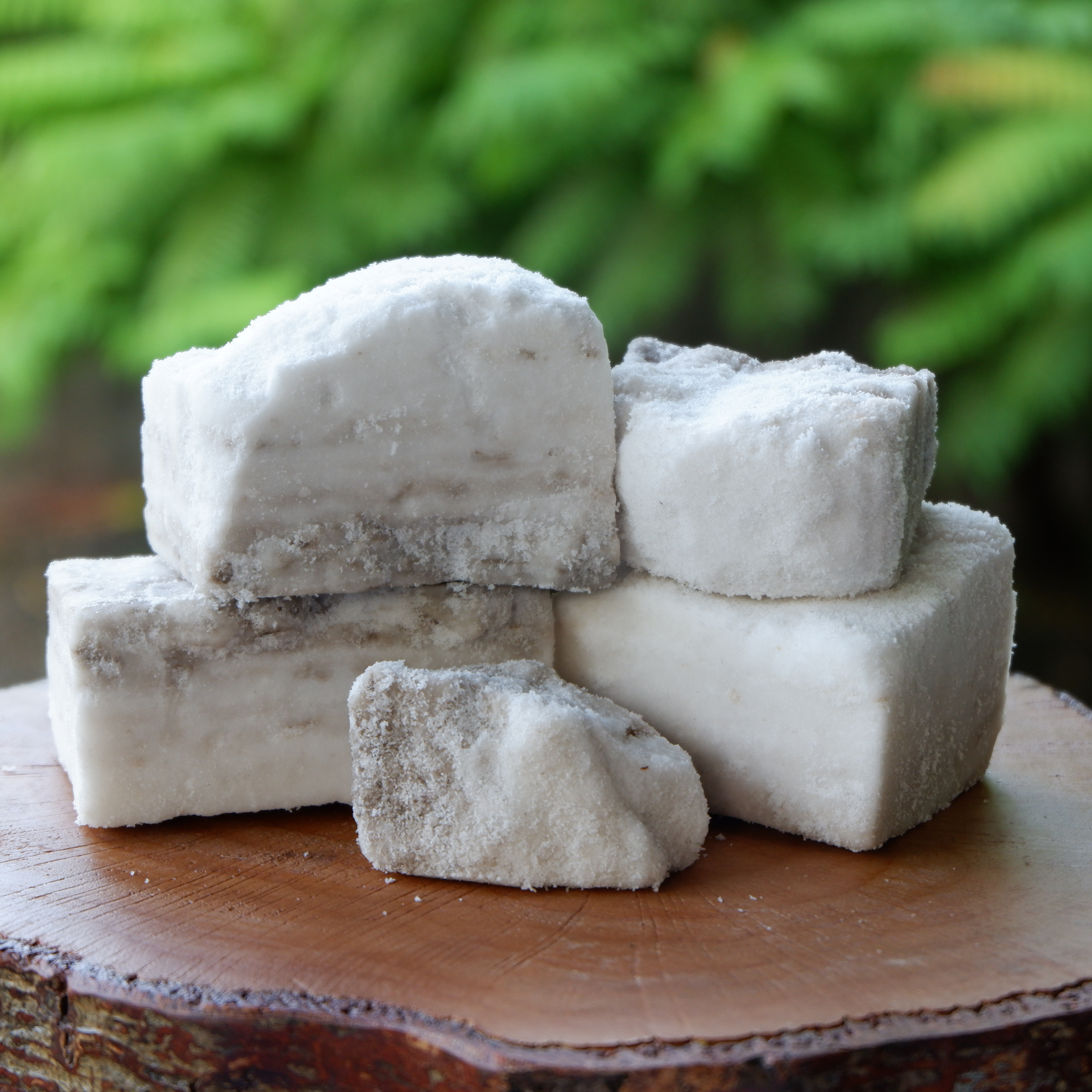
- Top: Asín tibuók Bottom: Túltul
- Type: Condiment
- Place of origin: Philippines
- Region or state: Visayas
- Associated cuisine: Philippine cuisine

The practice of making Asin Tibuok, the artisanal sea salt of the Boholano of Bohol Island, Philippines
- UNESCO Intangible Cultural Heritage
- Country: Philippines
- Reference: 02316
- Region: Asia and the Pacific

Inscription history
- Inscription: 2025 (20th session)
- List: Need of Urgent Safeguarding

Asín tibuók is a rare Filipino artisanal sea salt from the Boholano people made from filtering seawater through ashes. A related artisanal salt is known as túltul or dúkdok among the Ilonggo people. It is made similarly to asín tibuók but is boiled with gatâ (coconut milk).

Both of them are part of the unique traditional methods of producing sea salt for culinary use among the Visayan people of the central Philippine islands. They differ in taste from salt obtained through traditional drying beds or modern methods. Asín tibuók has a sharp, slightly alkaline taste with smoky and fruity undertones, while túltul has an innate savory flavor. They are characteristically finely textured with small granules. They are consumed by grating a light dusting over food.

The tradition of making asín tibuók and túltul is nearly extinct due to the difficulty and length of time it takes to manufacture them, the passing of the salt iodization (ASIN) law in 1995, as well as competition with modern imported salts. They are only barely preserved in Bohol, Capiz, and Guimaras. Asín tibuók is listed in the Ark of Taste international catalogue of endangered heritage foods by the Slow Food organization.

== Names ==
Asín tibuók literally means "unbroken salt" or "whole salt" in the Cebuano language of the Boholano people. It is the name of the salt in the island of Bohol.

Similar salt-making traditions also exist in Guimaras island and the neighboring province of Capiz in Panay Island. In Guimaras, it is known as túltul or tul-tul, meaning "lump"; while in Capiz, it is known as dukdok, meaning "pounded" or "pulverized". Both names are in the Hiligaynon language of the Ilonggo people.

== Production ==
The method of production varies slightly between the Boholano asín tibuók and the Ilonggo túltul or dúkdok. Both methods can only be done for six months of the year, from December to May, due to the fluctuations in seawater salinity during the rainy seasons.

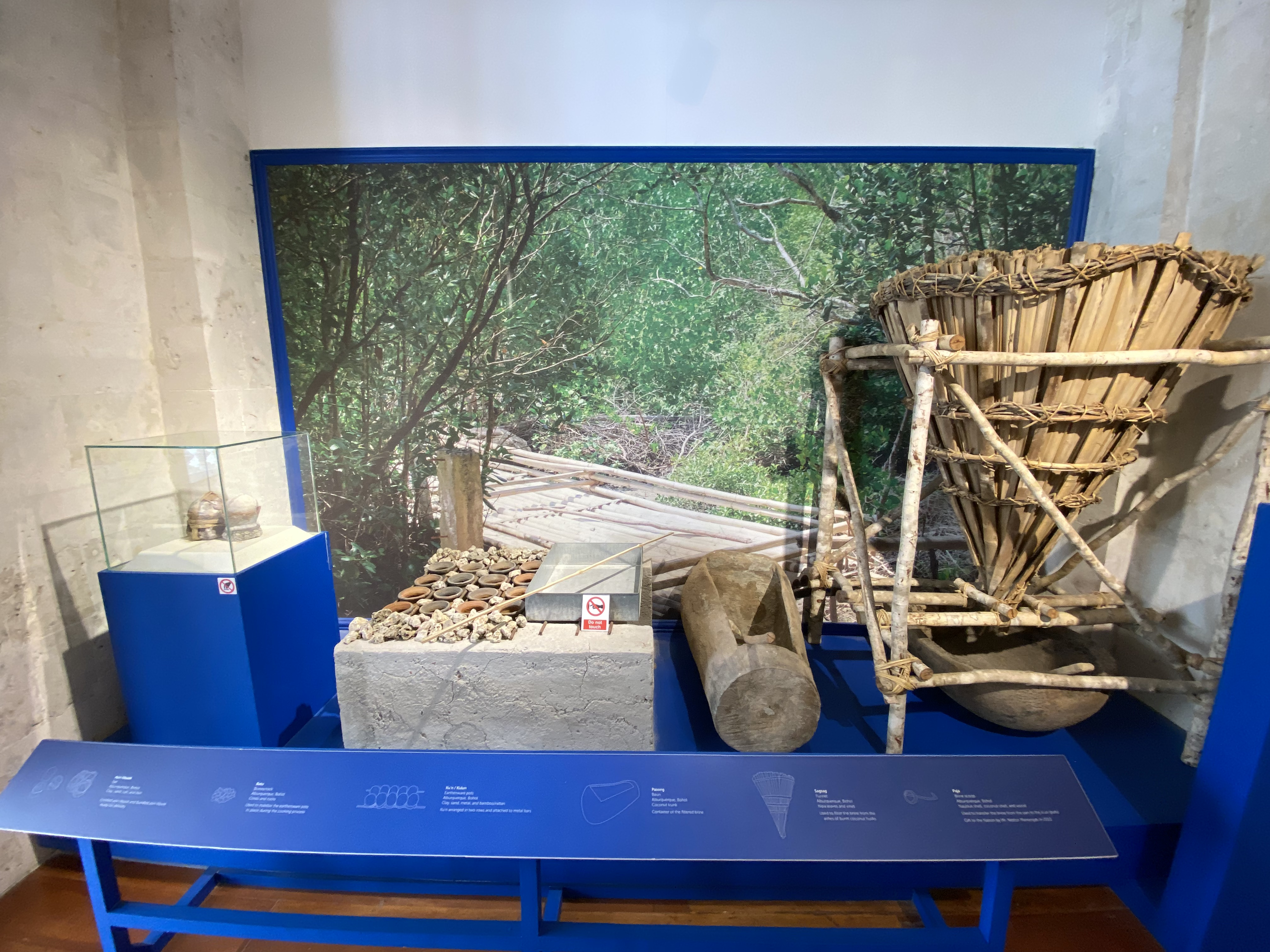
An exhibit at the National Museum of the Philippines - Bohol displaying the equipment used in the production of asín tibuók

=== Bohol ===
Boholano asín tibuók is made by soaking coconut husks for at least three months in special pits continually filled with seawater during the tides. They are then cut into small pieces and dried for a few days. They are burned in a pile until reduced completely to ash. This takes about a week. The ashes (called gasang) are gathered into a funnel-shaped bamboo filtering device. Seawater is poured into the ash, allowing the water to leach out the salt from the ashes. The brine (known as tasik) is collected into a hollowed-out coconut trunk beneath the funnels.

The tasik is poured into special clay pots and hung in walls in a special furnace. These are boiled for a few hours in the furnace, continually replenishing the pots with more tasik once some evaporate. Eventually, the pots will crack, revealing the solidified mass of salt. The salt mass will be initially very hot, and it usually takes a few hours before it is cool enough to be handled. They are sold along with the broken domed pots which has given them the nickname "the dinosaur egg" in international markets due to their appearance.

=== Guimaras and Capiz ===
Ilonggo túltul, duldul, or dukdok is made by gathering driftwood (rorok or dagsa) and other washed-up plant matter (twigs, reeds, coconut husks, bamboo stems, etc.) from the beach. These are burned completely into ash for about a week. The ash is then gathered into cylindrical woven bamboo containers known as kaing. The kaing are placed on bamboo platforms and a container is placed underneath. Seawater is poured through the ash and caught on these containers. The brine is then strained and transferred into other containers where it is mixed with gatâ (coconut milk). These are poured into molds (hurnohan) and boiled over an outdoor stove (kalán). More of the liquid is continually poured into the molds as they evaporate until nothing but a solid mass of salt remains. These brick-like lumps (known as bareta) are then packaged and sold.

== Culinary uses ==
Asín tibuók and túltul are often used as a finishing salt, consumed by grating a light dusting of them over food. They were traditionally dusted over plain hot rice with a few drops of oil and eaten as is. They are also used to season sinangag (traditional fried rice). Chunks can also be broken off and dipped into stews and dishes or ground and used like regular table salt.

== Conservation ==
Salt-makers (asinderos) were once important professions in Philippine society, but the craft is nearly extinct in modern times. Part of this is due to the time-consuming traditional methods of producing salt and the hard work that goes with it. Artisanal salt-makers can not compete with the cheap imported salt prevalent today in the Philippines. The passage of Republic Act No. 8172, the Act for Salt Iodization Nationwide (ASIN), in 1995 also placed further stress on local salt-makers, forcing many to give up the industry altogether.

Both asín tibuok and túltul are only made by a few families today. They are commonly sold to tourists and to gourmet restaurants that feature Filipino cuisine. Due to their rarity, they are more expensive than regular salt. Demand for asín tibuok and túltul frequently exceeds supply. The production of asín tibuok is also dependent on the availability of the raw materials, particularly coconut husks.

Asín tibuok is listed in the Ark of Taste international catalogue of endangered heritage foods by the Slow Food movement. In October 2025, asín tibuok of Alburquerque, Bohol, was also registered as a Geographical Indication (GI) by the Intellectual Property Office of the Philippines (IPOPHL). In December 2025, asín tibuok was recognized as Intangible Cultural Heritage in Need of Urgent Safeguarding by UNESCO.

== See also ==
- Salt industry in Las Piñas
- List of edible salts
