= Windsor Salt Mine =

Mine in Windsor, Ontario, Canada

The Windsor Salt Mine currently operates two locations in Windsor, Ontario, Canada. The first is the Ojibway Mine at 200 Morton Drive in Windsor, established in 1955, and is owned by The Canadian Salt Company, Limited. The facility has 250 employees, earns roughly $75–99 million a year, producing road and mining salt. The second location is the Windsor Facility of the Canadian Salt Company, located at 30 Prospect Ave. in Windsor. This facility employs 110 and estimates their sales at $25–50 million a year. It was established much earlier than the first, in 1893. Its main products are salt used for human consumption, water softening and agriculture. In 2008, Canadian Salt mined approximately 9.5 megatonnes from the Windsor mine, 85% of which went to deicing highways, and the remainder for manufacturing caustic soda and chlorine, producing pulp and paper, and water treatment.

== History ==
In the early days of Canada's European settlement, trappers brought shiploads of salt with them for personal uses such as curing hides and salting meat, as well as trading with the First Nations peoples. In 1860, the Saginaw Salt and Lumber Company began mining salt in nearby Michigan. It produced salt in limited amounts, as its main industry was lumber. In approximately 1890, William Van Horne, president of the Canadian Pacific Railway (CPR), realized the potential of the region. The company sunk a test well on CPR's land in Windsor and found salt in 1891. The test well was supervised by E.G Henderson, the civil engineer who supervised the CPR's London to Windsor Line. He would become the plant manager of The Windsor Salt Company Limited, which was built and operational in 1893. One reason for the CPR's interest in the Windsor Salt Mine is attributed to a desire to enable the company to haul freight in order to compete with other railroad companies such as the Grand Trunk Railway. From the beginning, Windsor's mine has been unique in Canada, using a vacuum pan technique that is utilized in the U.S., but not elsewhere in Canada.

== Financial Issues ==
The Windsor Salt Mine had a difficult start, with a financial crisis in 1897. By 1910, the Canadian Salt Company, as it was known since 1901, prospered sufficiently to purchase the Saginaw Lumber and Salt Company. Shortly before 1928, The Canadian Salt Company moved its operation to Sandwich and shuttered its older plant. In 1928, Canadian Industries Limited purchased the mine and in 1941, Neepawa Salt Company in Manitoba merged with Canadian Industry Limited. Canadian Industry withdrew from salt manufacturing in 1951, and Windsor, Neepawa, and a mine in Alberta were incorporated by H.R. Milner under the name Canadian Salt Company. In 1952, the Morton Salt Company of Chicago purchased a large interest in the company and established a subsidiary, the Canadian Rock Salt Company. In 1954, Canadian Industries Limited left Windsor, leaving Morton and the Canadian Rock Salt Company in Windsor.

In February 1954 a sinkhole appeared above the Prospect St. mine, leading to thousands of dollars' worth of damage. This also led to the public fearing for its safety. The Windsor Mine engineers assured the public that the area was safe, and spent weeks cleaning up the mess. Fifty thousand yards of fill were needed.

== Coordinates ==
- 200 Morton Drive, Windsor, ON 42.25559°N 83.10386°W
- 30 Prospect Avenue, Windsor, ON 42.28673°N 83.09156°W

== See also ==
- List of mines in Ontario
