= Twilight of the Punks =

2027 concert tour by Fall Out Boy

- Tour by Fall Out Boy
- Promotional poster for the North American dates
- Location: Europe; North America
- Start date: May 17, 2027
- End date: August 26, 2027
- Legs: 2
- No. of shows: 36
- Supporting acts: A Day to Remember; Good Charlotte; Neck Deep; The Offspring; The Story So Far
Fall Out Boy tour chronology
So Much For (Tour) Dust (2023–24)	Twilight of the Punks (2027)

Twilight of the Punks is an upcoming concert tour by American band Fall Out Boy.

== Background ==
The band announced the tour on November 9, 2026, and released the single "Aces" on the same day.

== Tour dates ==
List of 2027 concerts
Date	City	Country	Venue	Opening act	Attendance	Revenue
May 17, 2027	Prague	Czech Republic	O2 Arena	A Day to Remember; Neck Deep	—	—
May 19, 2027	Budapest	Hungary	László Papp Budapest Sports Arena	A Day to Remember; Neck Deep	—	—
May 21, 2027	Milan	Italy	Unipol Forum	A Day to Remember; Neck Deep	—	—
May 23, 2027	Madrid	Spain	Movistar Arena	A Day to Remember; Neck Deep	—	—
May 25, 2027	Lyon	France	LDLC Arena	A Day to Remember; Neck Deep	—	—
May 27, 2027	Brussels	Belgium	ING Arena	A Day to Remember; Neck Deep	—	—
May 28, 2027	Mönchengladbach	Germany	SparkassenPark	A Day to Remember; Neck Deep	—	—
May 30, 2027	Glasgow	Scotland	OVO Hydro	A Day to Remember; Neck Deep	—	—
June 1, 2027	Dublin	Ireland	3Arena	A Day to Remember; Neck Deep	—	—
June 3, 2027	Manchester	England	Co-op Live	A Day to Remember; Neck Deep	—	—
June 5, 2027	London	England	Tottenham Hotspur Stadium	A Day to Remember; Neck Deep	—	—
June 8, 2027	Amsterdam	Netherlands	Ziggo Dome	A Day to Remember; Neck Deep	—	—
June 10, 2027	Paris	France	Accor Arena	A Day to Remember; Neck Deep	—	—
June 12, 2027	Berlin	Germany	Zitadelle Spandau	A Day to Remember; Neck Deep	—	—
June 13, 2027	Łódź	Poland	Atlas Arena	A Day to Remember; Neck Deep	—	—
July 13, 2027	Arlington	United States	Globe Life Field	Good Charlotte; The Offspring; The Story So Far	—	—
July 16, 2027	Atlanta	United States	Truist Park	Good Charlotte; The Offspring; The Story So Far	—	—
July 18, 2027	Washington, D.C.	United States	Nationals Park	Good Charlotte; The Offspring; The Story So Far	—	—
July 20, 2027	Detroit	United States	Fifth Third Park	Good Charlotte; The Offspring; The Story So Far	—	—
July 22, 2027	Toronto	Canada	Rogers Stadium	Good Charlotte; The Offspring; The Story So Far	—	—
July 24, 2027	Chicago	United States	Soldier Field	Good Charlotte; The Offspring; The Story So Far	—	—
July 27, 2027	Nashville	United States	FirstBank Stadium	Good Charlotte; The Offspring; The Story So Far	—	—
July 30, 2027	Boston	United States	Fenway Park	Good Charlotte; The Offspring; The Story So Far	—	—
August 1, 2027	Queens	United States	Citi Field	Good Charlotte; The Offspring; The Story So Far	—	—
August 3, 2027	Atlantic City	United States	Atlantic City Beach	Good Charlotte; The Offspring; The Story So Far	—	—
August 4, 2027	Hershey	United States	Hersheypark Stadium	Good Charlotte; The Offspring; The Story So Far	—	—
August 6, 2027	St. Charles	United States	Roaming Hills	The Offspring; The Story So Far	—	—
August 7, 2027	Kansas City	United States	Morton Amphitheater	The Offspring; The Story So Far	—	—
August 10, 2027	Commerce City	United States	Dick's Sporting Goods Park	Good Charlotte; The Offspring; The Story So Far	—	—
August 13, 2027	Sandy	United States	America First Field	Good Charlotte; The Offspring; The Story So Far	—	—
August 15, 2027	San Francisco	United States	Oracle Park	Good Charlotte; The Offspring; The Story So Far	—	—
August 17, 2027	San Diego	United States	Petco Park	Good Charlotte; The Offspring; The Story So Far	—	—
August 19, 2027	Phoenix	United States	Chase Field	Good Charlotte; The Offspring; The Story So Far	—	—
August 21, 2027	Los Angeles	United States	Dodger Stadium	Good Charlotte; The Offspring; The Story So Far	—	—
August 24, 2027	Seattle	United States	T-Mobile Park	Good Charlotte; The Offspring; The Story So Far	—	—
August 26, 2027	Portland	United States	Providence Park	Good Charlotte; The Offspring; The Story So Far	—	—
