= Windsor Salt =

Salt mining, processing, and distribution company based in Pointe-Claire, Quebec

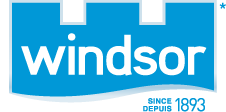
- Industry: Salt Mining
- Predecessor: K+S Windsor Salt; Windsor Salt Company; The Canadian Salt Company Limited
- Founded: 1893
- Headquarters: Pointe-Claire, Quebec
- Number of locations: Alberta, Nova Scotia, Ontario, Quebec, Saskatchewan
- Area served: Canada
- Key people: Mark Demetree, CEO
- Products: salt mining and refining
- Number of employees: 861
- Parent: Morton Salt
- Website: Windsor Salt

Windsor Salt is a national salt mining, processing, and distribution company based in Pointe-Claire, Quebec, Canada. It operates salt mines in Pugwash, Nova Scotia (the Windsor Salt Pugwash Mine) and Windsor, Ontario (the Windsor Salt Mine). From the salt it mines and produces through evaporative processes, it produces and distributes products for household use, food production, as well as products for agricultural, commercial, and industrial use. Government agencies use a number of its products for ice control on roads in the winter.

The company was previously named The Windsor Salt Company and The Canadian Salt Company, Limited (French: La Société Canadienne de Sel Limitée).

== History and company information ==
Windsor Salt was founded in 1893 as The Windsor Salt Company by three employees of the Canadian Pacific Railway. It was also known as The Canadian Salt Company, Limited (French: La Société Canadienne de Sel Limitée) for a time. Since 1954, it has been owned by Morton Salt.

From 2009 to 2021, Windsor Salt and Morton salt were owned by German chemical company K+S, and the company is Canada's largest salt manufacturer. In 2020, Windsor Salt's parent, K+S, sold Windsor Salt and Morton Salt to Kissner Group, which is controlled by Stone Canyon Industries Holdings (SCIH) and Mark Demetree.

The company is headquartered in Pointe-Claire, Quebec. It employs over 800 people in its three regional sales offices, three evaporated salt plants, three rock salt mines, and throughout a network of warehouses and salt storage facilities.

== Products ==
Windsor Salt recovers, processes, imports, and distributes over 200 evaporated and rock salt products under multiple brand names, including Windsor, Safe-T-Salt and Fino. The company's evaporated salt products are used in household and food products, as well as for agricultural, water softening and industrial purposes. Windsor Salt sells table salt, household salt, Kosher salt, pickling salt, water softening pellets, seasoning, himalayan pink salt, and sea salt.
