= Salt industry in Las Piñas =

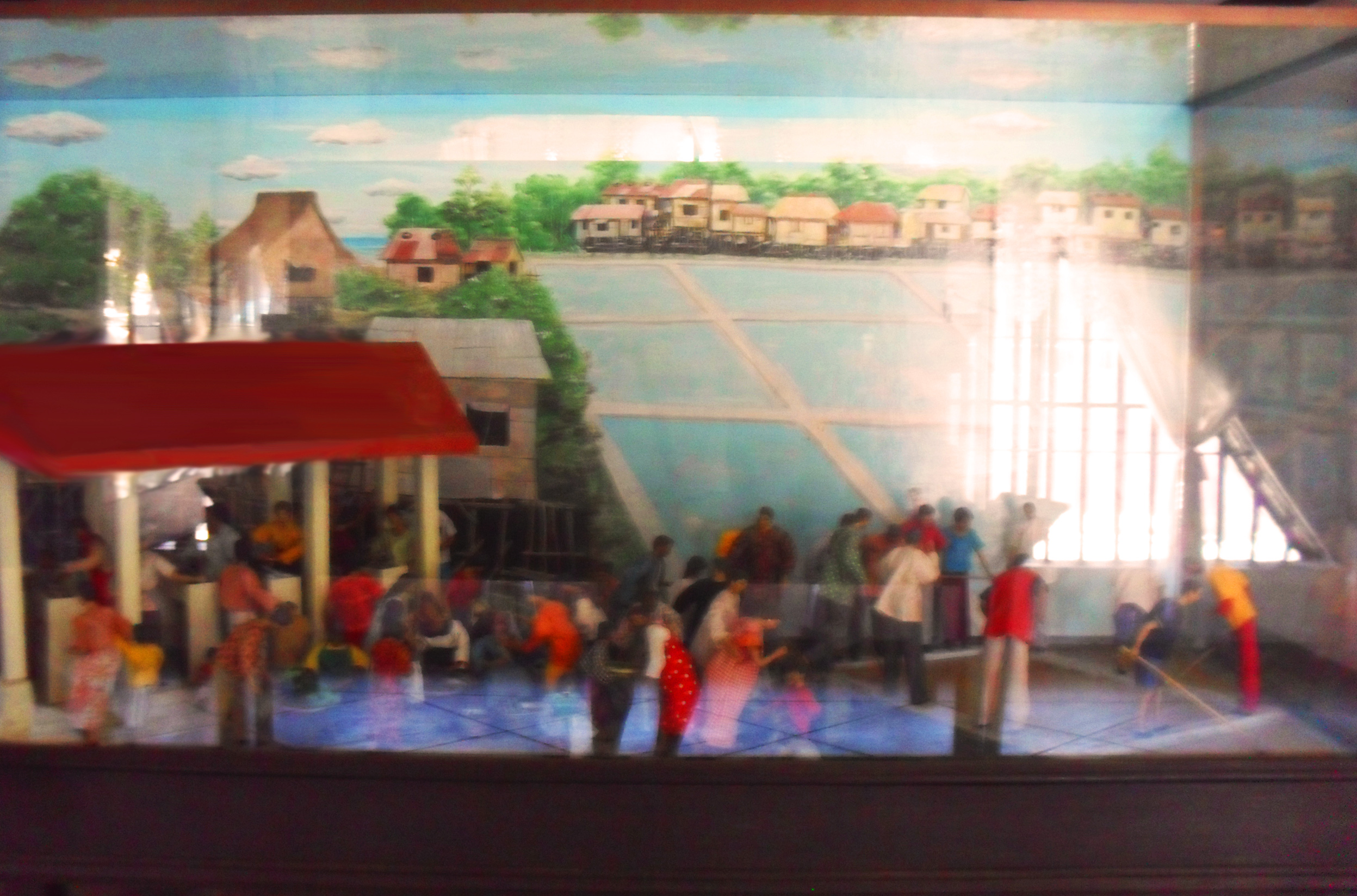
Salt-making diorama located at Bulwagang Ezekiel Moreno

The Las Piñas shoreline along Manila Bay was a popular destination among beach lovers, both for swimming and as a vantage point to watch the famous Manila Bay sunset. With the shoreline teeming with marine life, fishing was one of the main occupations of the locals. Other sources of livelihood included farming and salt-making.

Las Piñas City was once dubbed as the “Saltbed of the Philippines". The Irasan or the Las Piñas Salt Bed in Barangay Pulanglupa, which is part of the Las Piñas Historical Project, was formally opened on December 13, 2005. The technical assistance came from the Pangasinan State University.

== History ==
=== Revitalization of Irasan ===
By the 18th century, salt-making technology was introduced in the locality using solar bed dryers. Over time, hundreds of hectares surrounding the old town were converted into salt beds. Later, clay tiles or gibak were brought down from Vigan to line the salt beds. This prevented the salt from coming into contact with the earthen ground. This allowed the salt produced to become white as snow and established the reputation of Las Piñas as a salt-making center as well into the 20th century.

Representative Cynthia Aguilar Villar sought the assistance of the Department of Agriculture in rebuilding the salt farms. However, the proposal was turned down due to incapability of the agency to provide technology needed for the job. She also had acquaintances from salt-making experts in a forum held at Pangasinan State University. This paved the way for building linkages between former Senator Manuel Villar and Representative Cynthia Villar of Las Piñas and the administration of Pangasinan State University - eventually launching the Solar Salt Demo-Project.

On the other hand, the construction of Las Piñas Fish Port was immediately assisted by the former Department of Agriculture Secretary Leony Montemayor - who happens to be a colleague of her husband, Manuel Villar. The fish port was constructed at Bernabe Compound in Barangay Pulanglupa 1. At present, some Las Piñeros, who are fishermen and clam and mussels harvesters, from Barangays E. Aldana, Pulang-lupa 1 and Daniel Fajardo still uses the facility.

== Description ==
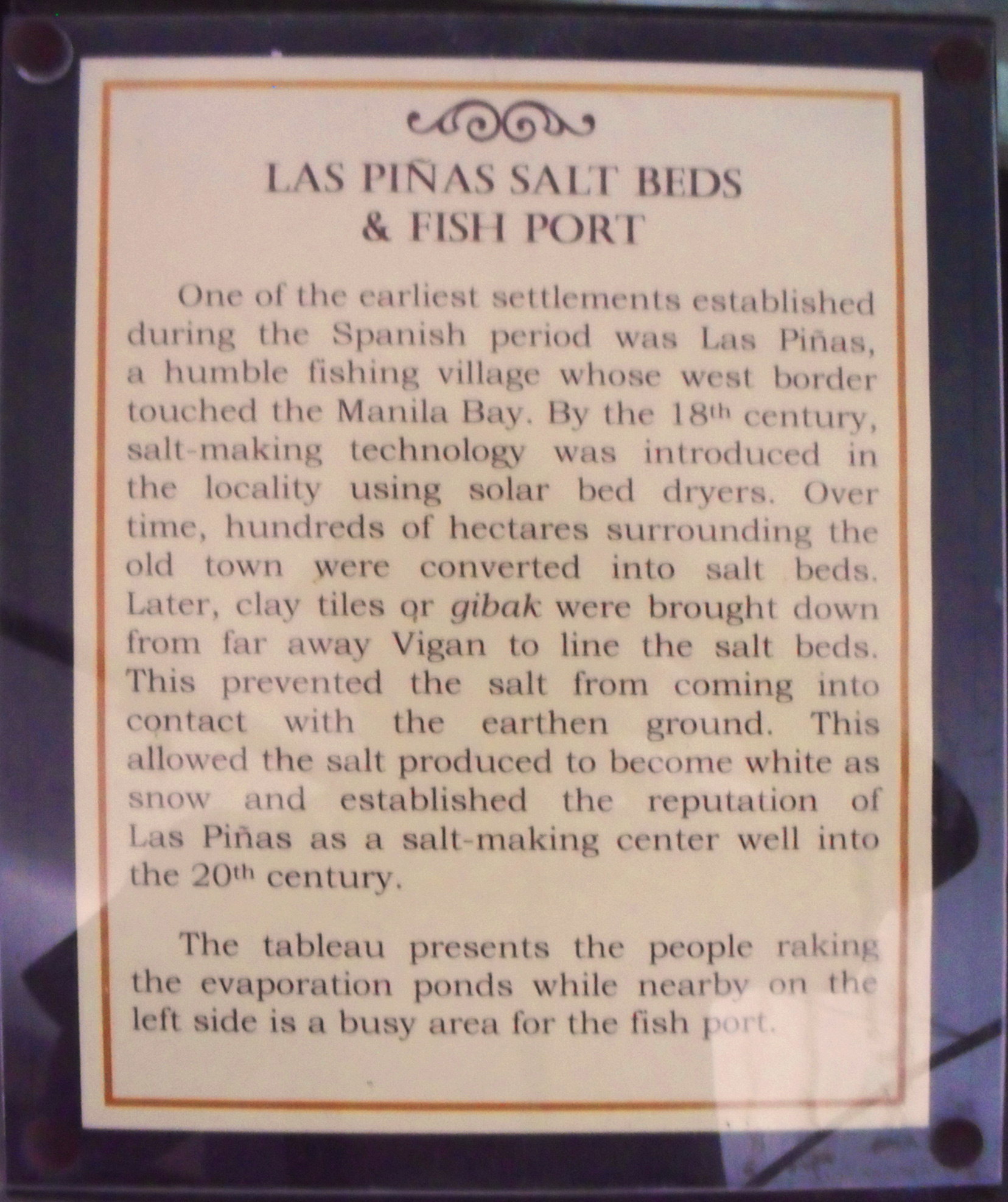
Tableau marker located at Bulwagang Ezekiel Moreno

The salt bed, located on a 3,000 square-meter property in Barangay Pulang Lupa I, can produce an average of 45 to 50 kilos of rock salt daily. During harvest time, the scenery of Las Piñas was filled with small pyramids of white crystals. The salt was graded and classified as either tertia, segunda and primera.

Tertia salt had the most impurities and was darkest in color. This salt was used with dry ice to preserve ice cream. Segunda salt was used to preserve fresh fish. The wholesale seafood trading communities in Navotas and Malabon were the main buyers of segunda salt. But Las Piñas was most known for its primera or first class salt which is fabled to be as white as snow. Primera salt was distributed to all public markets of Manila and used to flavor fine dishes.

=== Iras Intsik ===
The technique known as iras Intsik or solar evaporation method was practiced to achieve superior quality of salt. Chinese traders who came regularly to Parañaque taught this technique to the early Filipinos. Even until the 1970s it was a familiar sight, most especially in the summer months, to see mounds of salt being harvested at the salt beds. During the rainy season these salt beds became converted into fishponds. However, today one neither sees much of these salt beds nor the fishponds for they occupy only three percent of the total land area of Las Piñas. Instead, they are now localized at the lower areas along Manila Bay as well as along the Las Piñas River.

== Present situation ==
The site is currently built mostly with residential structures with a number of commercial establishments. The northwest side of the salt beds is the current Las Piñas Dump Site, and the south and southeastern sides are composed of residential/commercial area. The increasing population needed affordable housing, putting pressure to convert many of the salt beds into residential subdivisions. Pollution from industrial and domestic sewerage draining into Manila Bay destroyed the pristine waters which had been the salt industry's primary ingredient.

The reclamation of the bay area and the subsequent construction of the Coastal Road disrupted salt production. The dredging and construction work prevented fishermen from going out to sea. Bulk of the salt produced began falling into the lower priced segunda and tertia categories. Salt imported from other countries like China and India were offered at lower prices. These developments brought an end to the salt production industry, which is now just a memory of Las Piñas’ past.

== Gallery ==
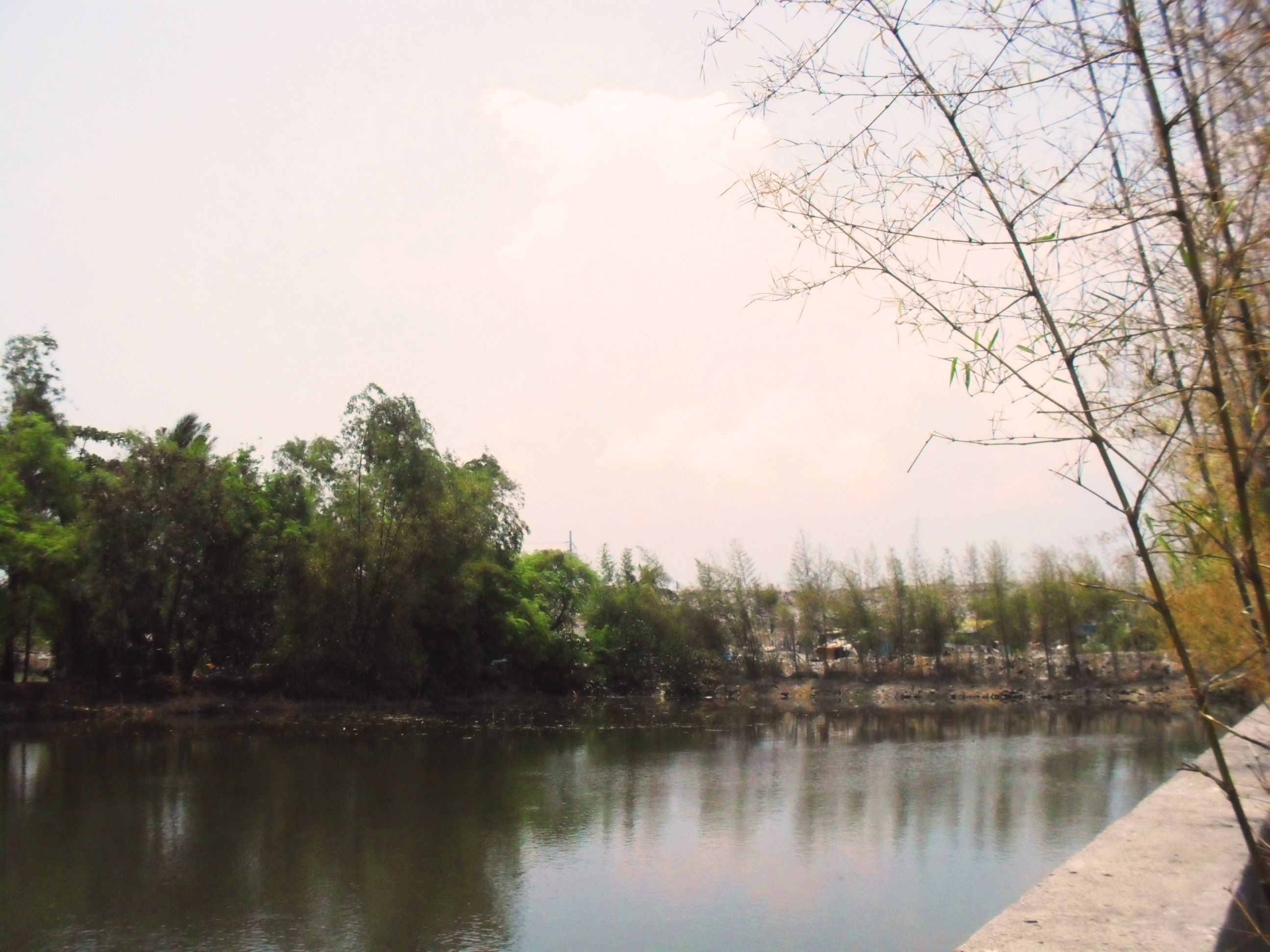
Northeast view of Las Piñas Salt Beds

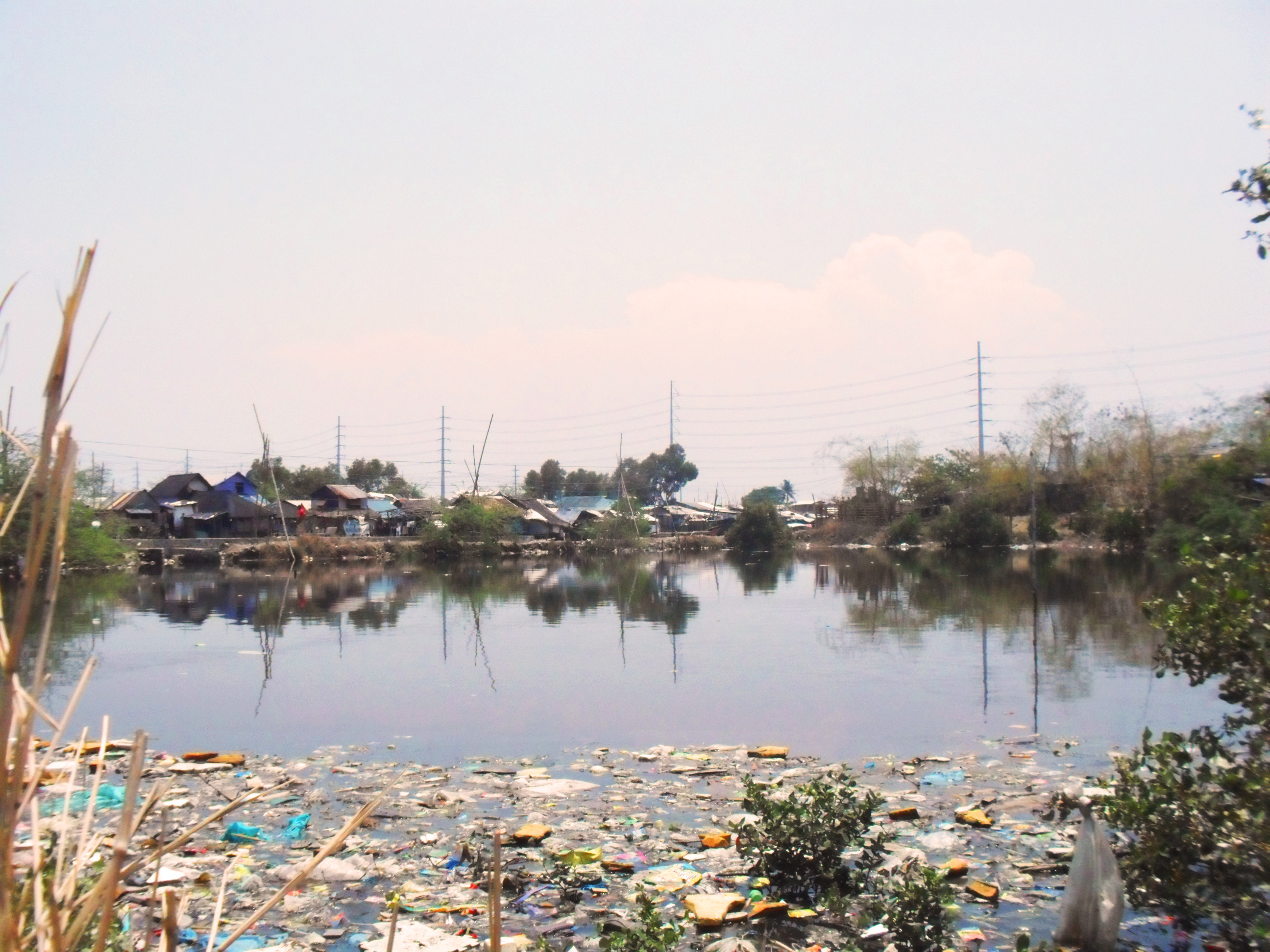
Northwest view of Las Piñas Salt Beds

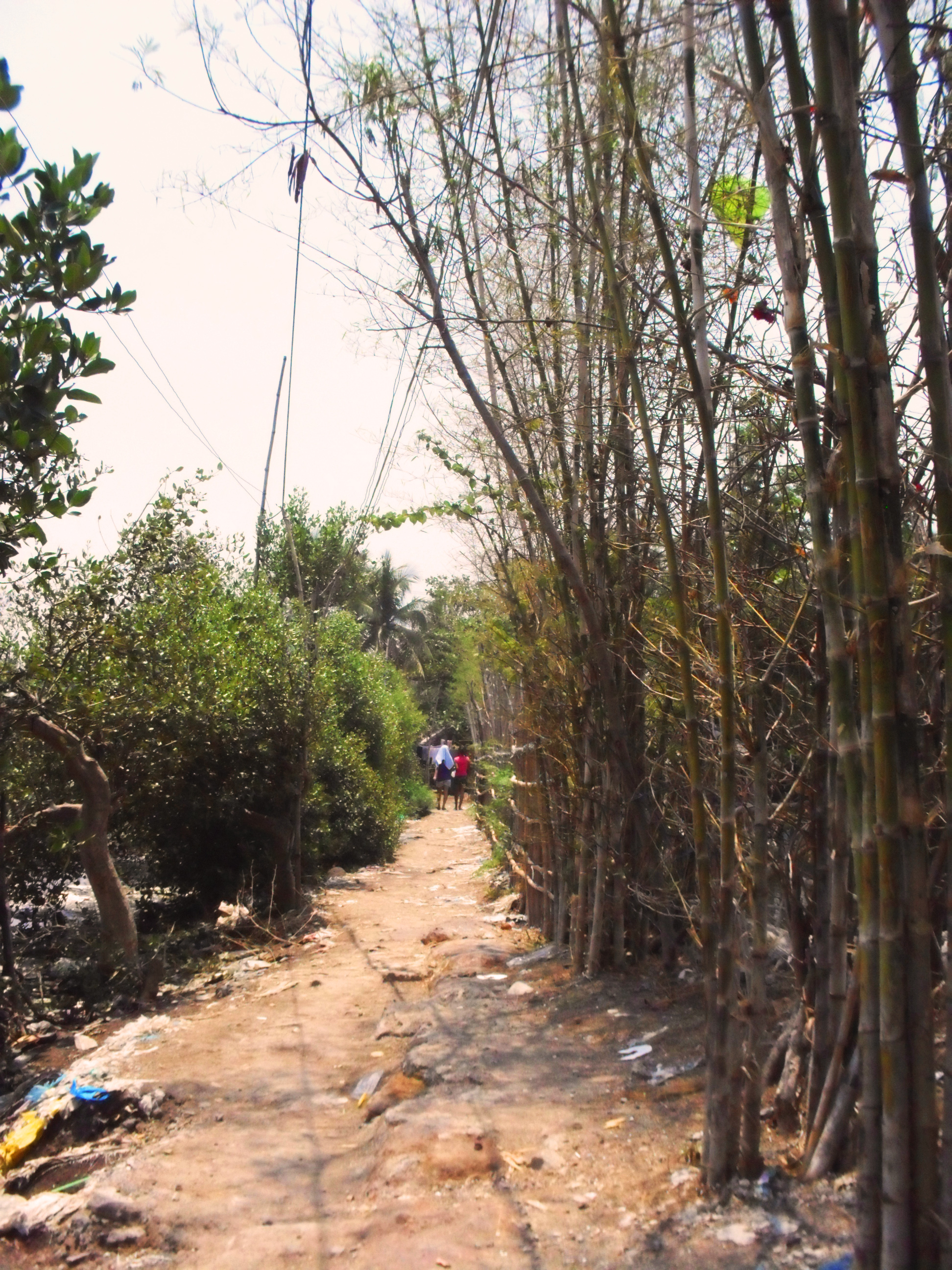
Adobe pathway going northern part of the Las Piñas Salt Beds

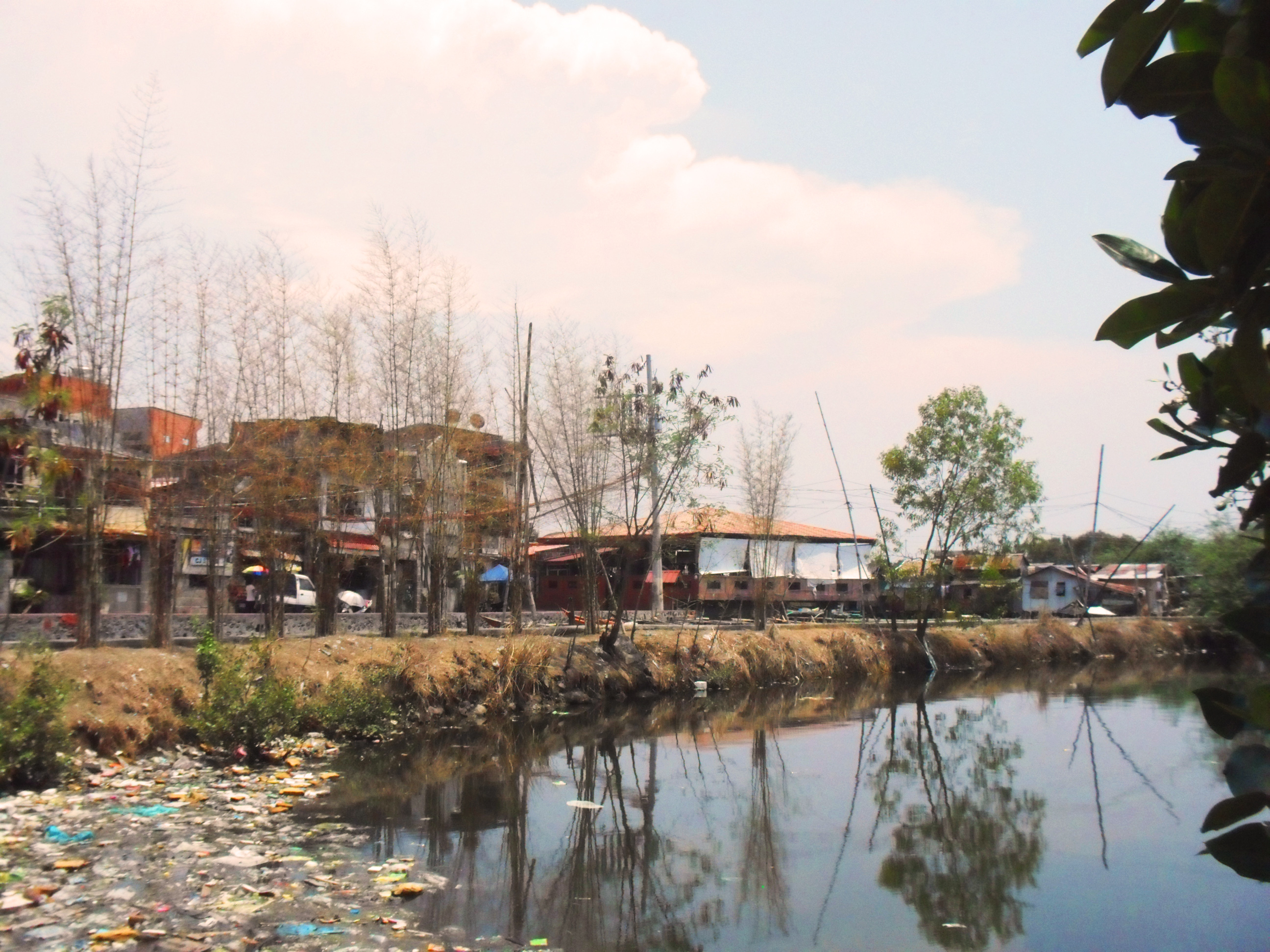
Las Piñas Fish Port; Northwest view of Las Piñas Salt Beds

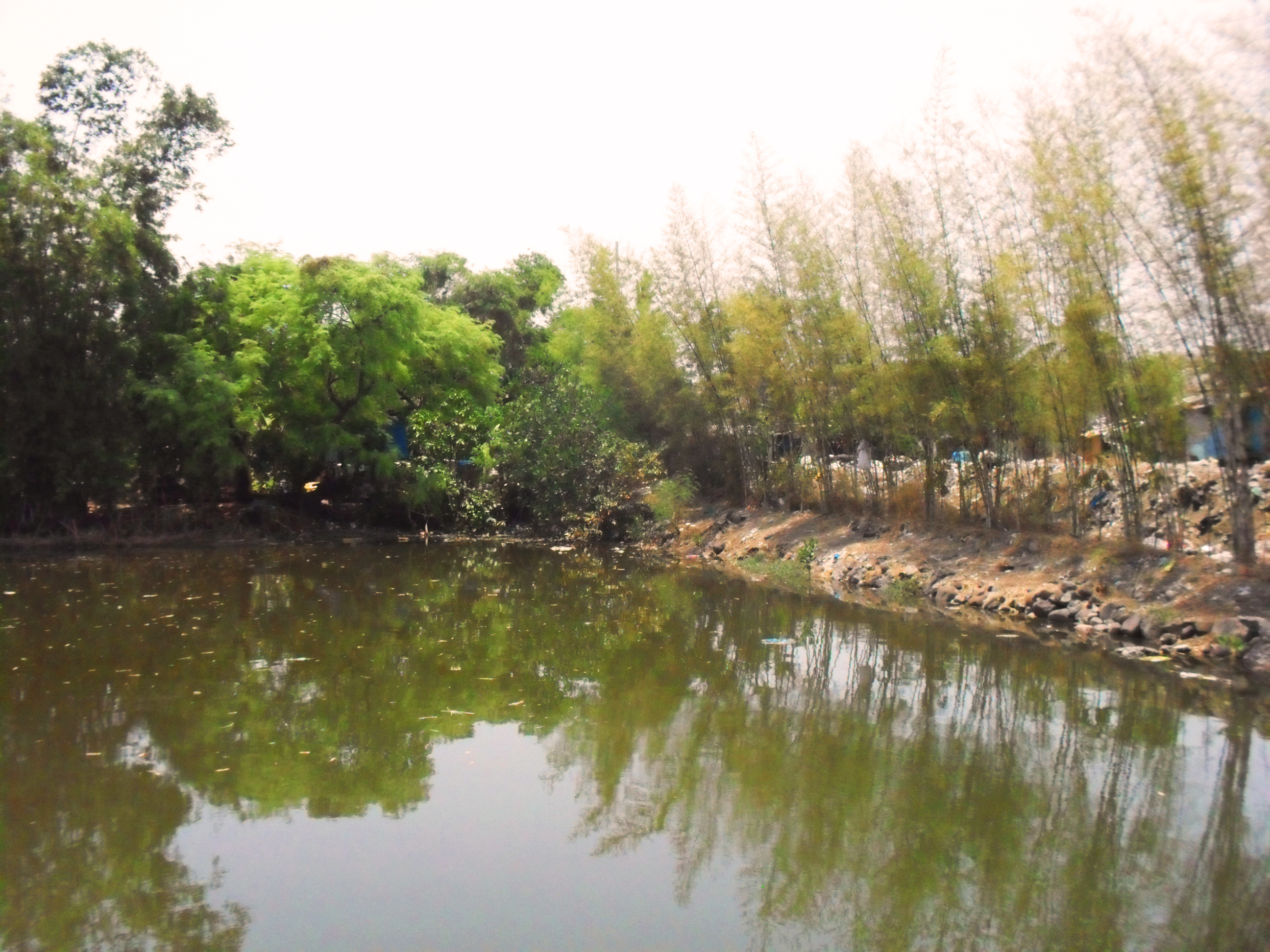
Adjacent dump site at the northeast side of Las Piñas Salt Beds

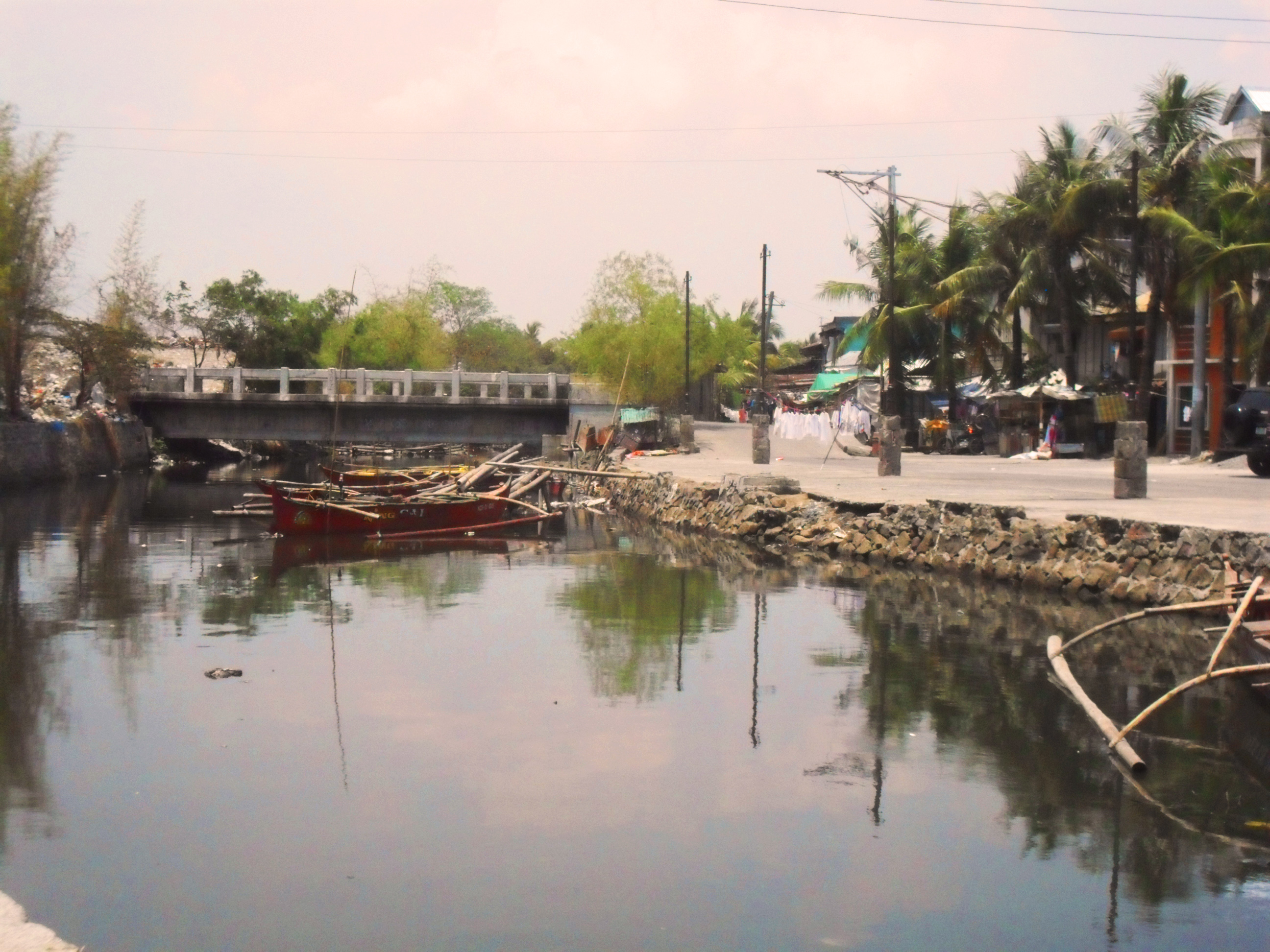
Newly constructed concrete bridge crossing Munting Ilog

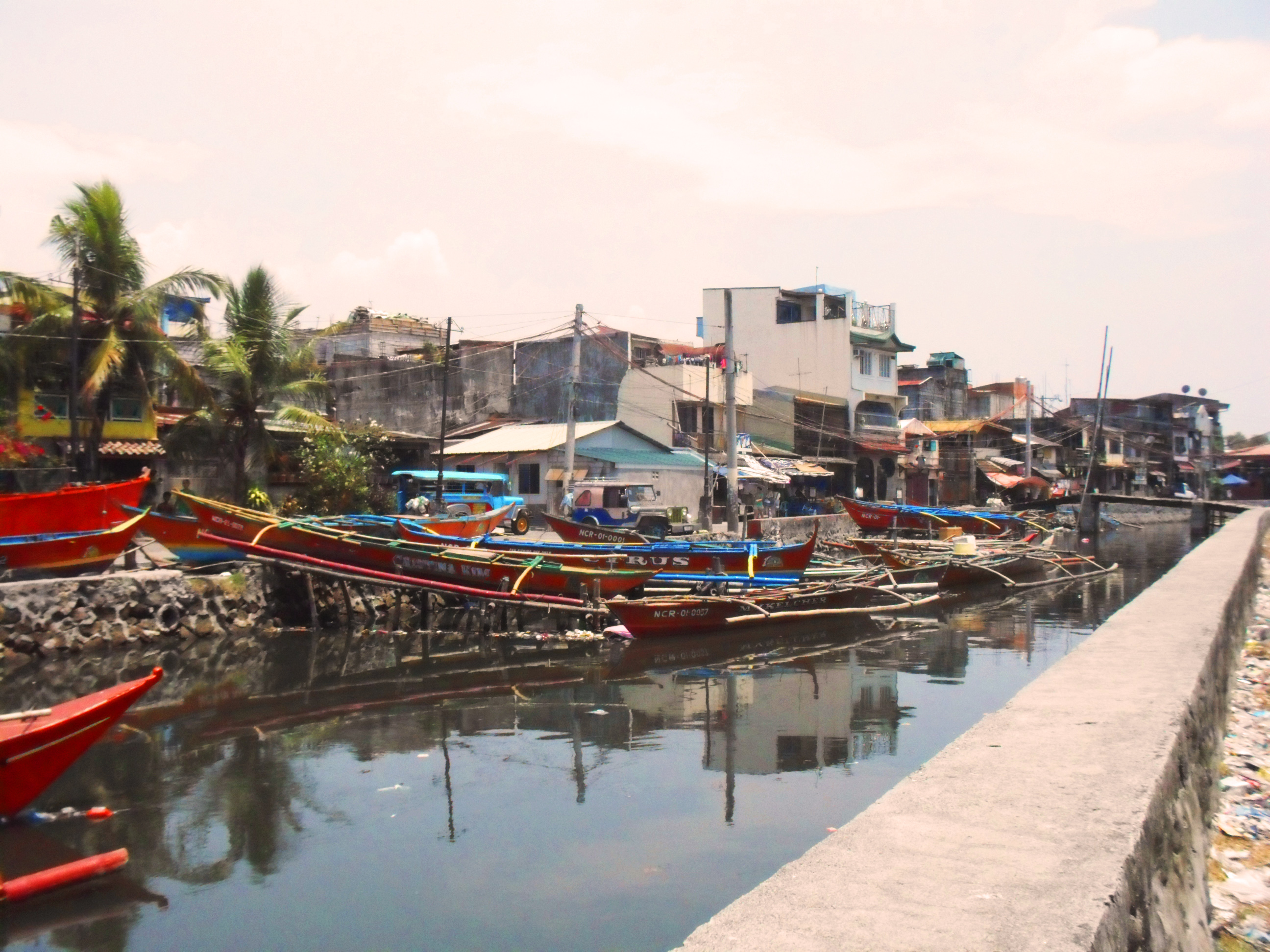
Fishing boats along Munting Ilog

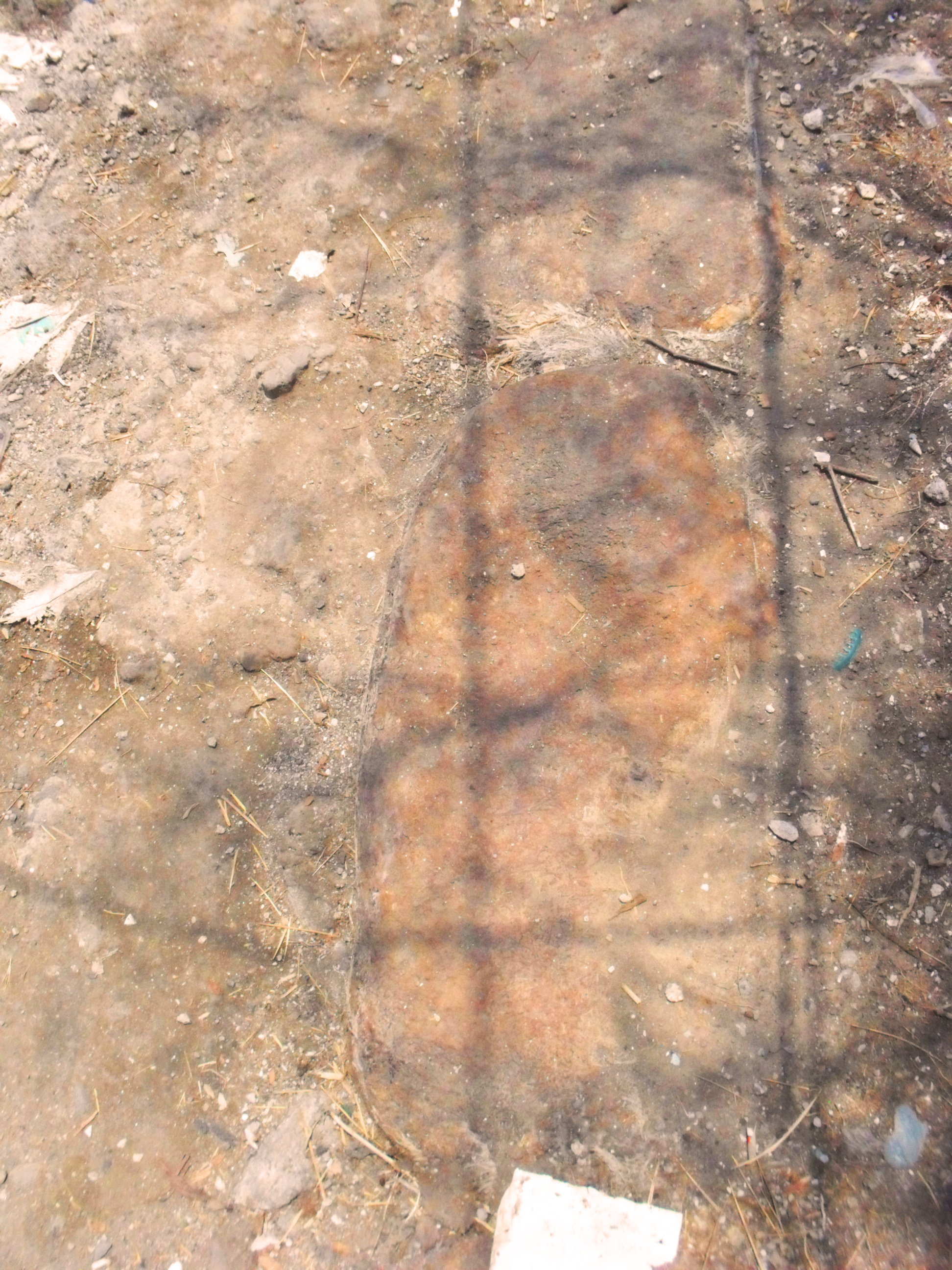
Adobe rock pathway

== See also ==
- Asín tibuok
