= David Murray Cowie =

Pioneer of the salt iodization process in the US

David M. Cowie
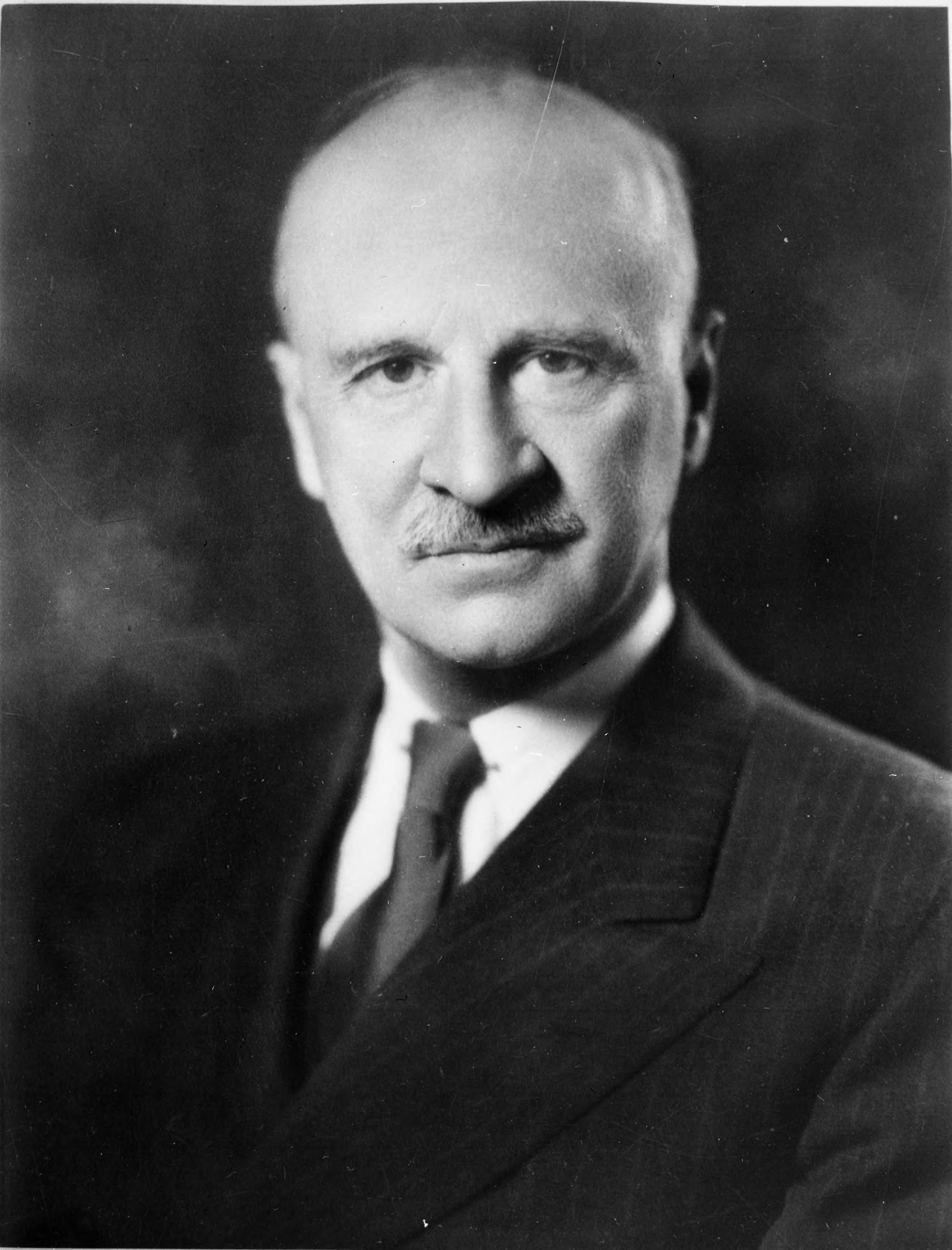
- Born: November 19, 1872; New Brunswick, Canada
- Died: January 27, 1940 (aged 67)
- Education: Battle Creek College; University of Michigan; University of Heidelberg
- Scientific career
- Fields: Pediatrics
- Institutions: University of Michigan

David Murray Cowie (November 19, 1872 – January 27, 1940) was a Canadian-American physician. He pioneered the salt iodization process in the U.S. He founded the pediatrics department at the University of Michigan and ran a private hospital in Ann Arbor which attracted wealthy patients. Cowie was concerned about the widespread problem of goiter in Michigan (nicknamed the "goiter belt" of America).

== Education and family life ==
Cowie was born on November 19, 1872, in New Brunswick, Canada. His grandfather was a doctor trained in Glasgow, Scotland. He went to Battle Creek College in 1892 before transferring to University of Michigan to study medicine. He took a second degree at the University of Heidelberg in Germany in 1908. In 1908 he married Anna Marion Cook who was also a doctor.

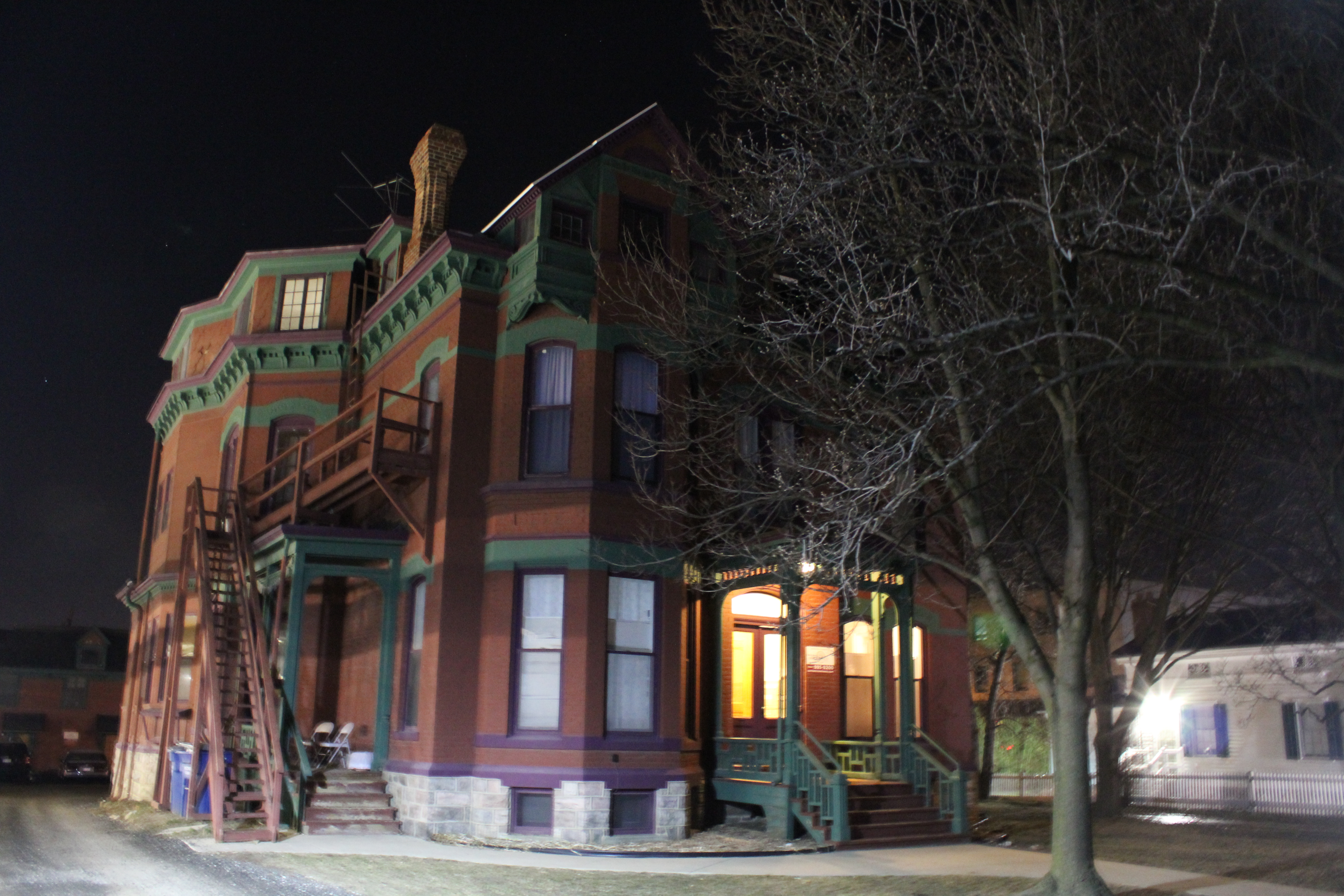
In 1920, Cowie purchased this mansion in Ann Arbor and converted in it into a private hospital.

== Medical practice ==
After medical school, Cowie was hired by the University of Michigan as an assistant in internal medicine in 1896, working under George Dock on infectious diseases of children. He soon left to study in Germany. On his return he started the pediatrics department at the U-M Hospital. Within a few years he started a small private hospital as well. In 1918 he purchased a large house at 320 South Division in Ann Arbor to house a larger private hospital. In 1920 he was named the first professor of pediatrics at the University of Michigan. He was also a researcher, publishing around 100 articles on a variety of medical topics. His study of the issue of goiter in the Midwest would lead to one of his major accomplishments.

== Goiter and iodized salt ==
In the U.S. in the early 20th century, goiter was especially prevalent in the region around the Great Lakes and the Pacific Northwest. Goiter began receiving serious attention as a result of the World War I draft pointing to the problem in Northern Michigan and Wisconsin. At this time, many men were disqualified from military service as a result of the public health problem.

Aware of the Swiss process of adding sodium iodide or potassium iodide to table and cooking salt, Cowie decided that a simple way to address the problem of iodine deficiency would be to merely implement the Swiss solution in America. He noted that adding iodine to aquatic environments in the Pacific Northwest seemed to decrease the incidence of goiter among fish species. Public opinion also supported his effort in that "important discoveries of vitamins and their roles in food nutrition" were happening during the period. Cowie appealed to the Michigan State Medical Society, a "productive group which concerned itself with the search for answers to difficult medical questions pertaining to the health of the state's residents".

Incorporating iodine into a regular diet would not be an easy process; the salt producers of America had to be persuaded to incorporate sodium iodide into their production process. It was difficult to prove that people who consumed iodized salt were better protected from simple goiter, a difficulty that contributed to resistance to the movement. Cowie and the Michigan State Medical Society turned to the Michigan Salt Producer's Association in 1923. Soon, an iodized salt committee was formed. After several months of meetings and deliberations with physicians and educators, the Executive Council of the Michigan State Medical Society gave Cowie the authority to endorse and implement the production of iodized salt, and the Michigan salt producers agreed to begin producing iodized table salt with labels reading "contains .01 per cent sodium iodide".

On May 1, 1924, iodized salt by Diamond Crystal Salt, Mulkey Salt, Inland Delray Salt, Michigan Salt Works, and Ruggles and Rademaker appeared on Michigan grocers' shelves. By the fall of 1924, Morton Salt Company began distributing iodized salt nationally.

Cowie's efforts to improve the public health environment necessitated broad cooperation. Cowie gained support from the medical board and market support from the Michigan Salt Producers Association, and with this scientific backing, the general public accepted the change.

Another person who is also credited for the introduction of iodized table salt to America is Dr. William A. Hudson, who devoted much of his time to the study of iodine levels in the blood while at Washington University, the Royal Victoria Hospital in Montreal, and Ford Hospital in Detroit.
