= Morton Salt =

American salt production company

- When it rains, it pours

- Consumer container of table salt
- Type: Subsidiary
- Industry: Food; Manufacturing
- Predecessor: Richmond & Company (1848)
- Founded: Renamed 1889 (137 years ago) by Joy Morton
- Headquarters: Overland Park, Kansas, U.S.
- Key people: Mark Demetree, CEO
- Products: Salt
- Parent: Stone Canyon Industries (2021–present)
- Website: mortonsalt.com

Morton Salt is an American food company producing salt for food, water conditioning, industrial, agricultural, and road/highway use. Based in Kansas City, the business is North America's leading producer and marketer of salt. It is a subsidiary of holding company Stone Canyon Industries Holdings, Inc.

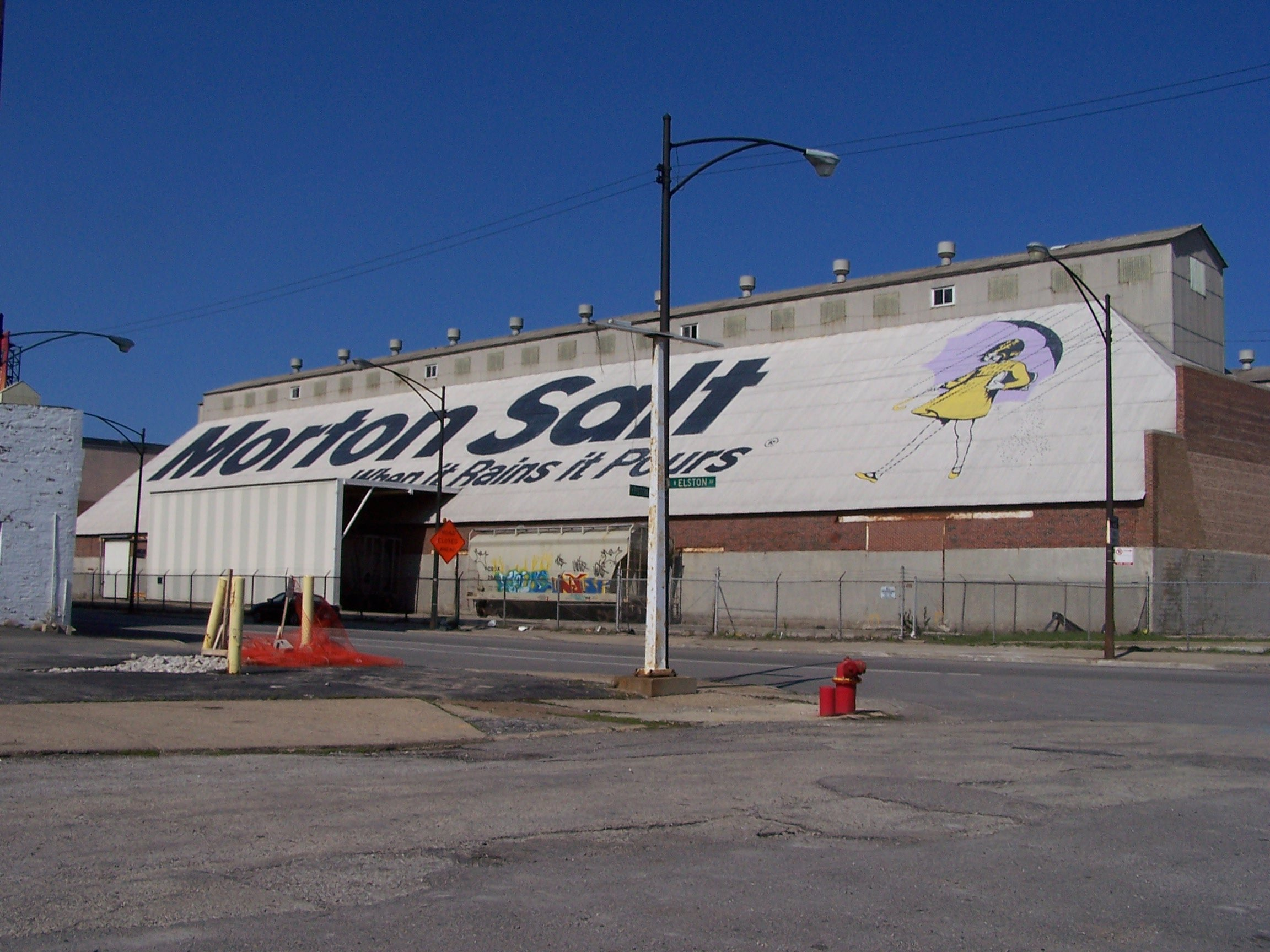
Former Morton Salt facility in Chicago, Illinois; now The Salt Shed live music venue

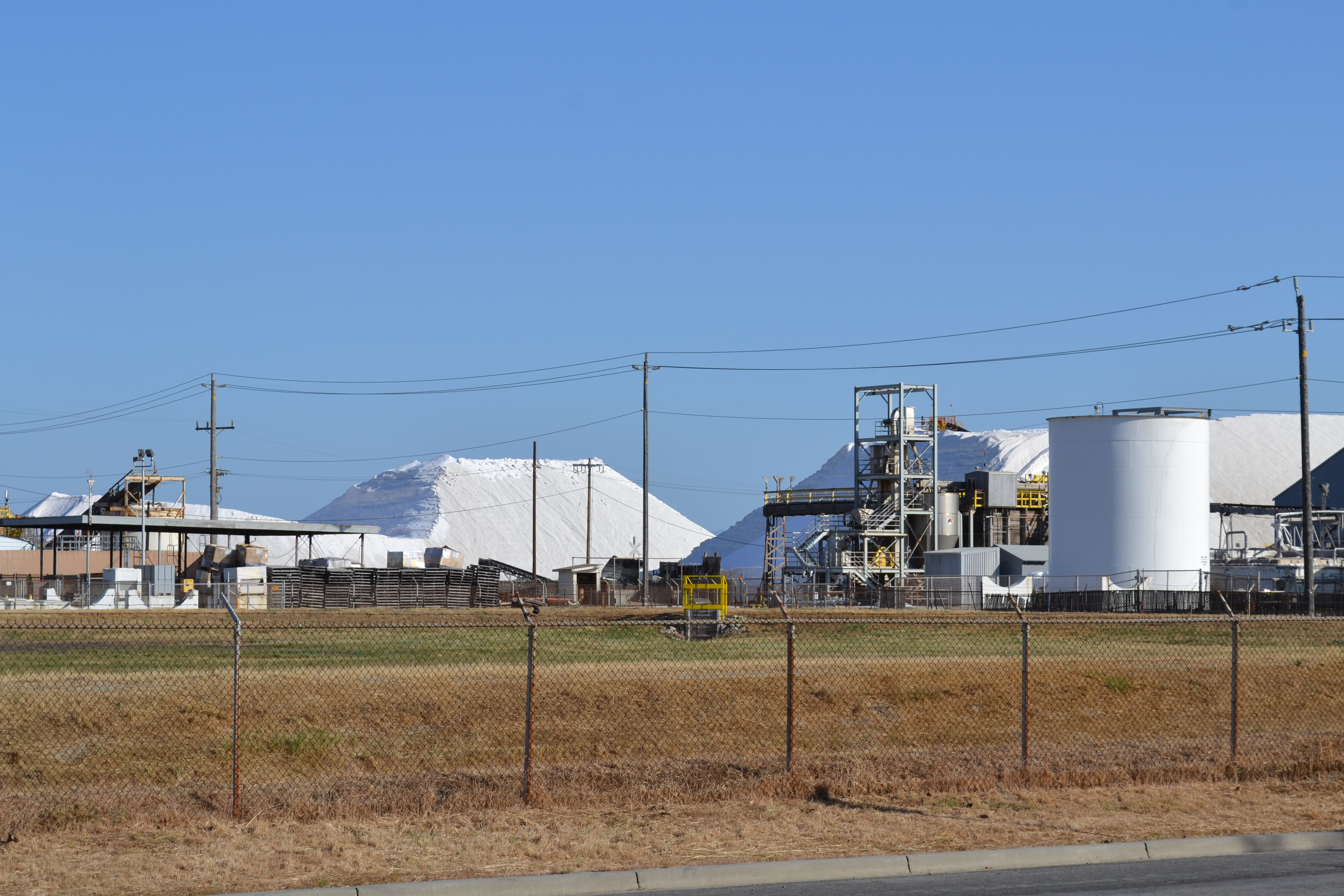
Salt mounds at Morton Salt in Newark, California

== History ==
The company began in Chicago, Illinois, in 1848 as a small sales agency, Richmond & Company, started by Alonzo Richmond as agents for Onondaga salt companies to sell their salt to the Midwest.

Joy Morton started working for E. I. Wheeler in 1880, buying into the company for $10,000, (Note: equivalent to $333,621 in 2025) with which he bought a fleet of lake boats to move salt west. In 1889, it was renamed after the owner, Joy Morton.

In 1910, the business, which had by that time become both a manufacturer and a merchant of salt, was incorporated as the Morton Salt Company.

In 1896, Alfred Bevis founded the Bevis Rock Salt Company, building on the failed Lyons salt company in which he had previously invested and which he had run. His daughter, Florence, married Charles Howard Longstreth, whom Bevis brought into both the Lyons and Bevis salt companies as an executive. Their son, Bevis Longstreth, became president and general manager on his return from service in World War I.

In 1919, Morton Salt acquired Bevis.

About ten years later, Bevis Longstreth founded Thiokol Corporation.

In 1924, Morton Salt contributed to a major public health intervention by introducing and nationally distributing iodized salt. Prior to this, iodine deficiency was a widespread problem, particularly in regions such as the Great Lakes, Appalachians, and Pacific Northwest, areas collectively known as the "goiter belt". In these regions, iodine-poor soils contributed to high rates of goiter and other iodine deficiency disorders, sometimes affecting up to 70% of children.

In 1954 Morton acquired the second-largest solar saline operation in North America, in Matthew Town, Inagua, Bahamas.

In 1958, the company realized that their salt was not living up to their slogan. A chemist, Richard A. Patton, was given the assignment to solve this problem. He invented a machine that would coat the salt with a byproduct of salt mining, magnesium oxide. Calcium silicate is now used instead for the same purpose. The same chemist developed a total of 27 patents, along with fellow chemists, that expanded Morton's commercialization of magnesium oxide.

In 1969, the name "Morton-Norwich" came into use.

In 1982 Morton Salt merged with Thiokol to form Morton-Thiokol. This merger was ended in 1989, following the 1986 Space Shuttle Challenger disaster, which was blamed on Morton-Thiokol products. Morton received the company's consumer chemical products divisions, while Thiokol retained the space propulsion systems division.

In 1999, Morton Salt was acquired by the Philadelphia-based Rohm and Haas Company, Inc. and operated as a division of that company along with the Canadian Salt Company, which Morton had acquired in 1954.

On April 2, 2009, it was reported that Morton Salt was being acquired by German fertilizer and salt company K+S for a total enterprise value of US$1.7 billion. (Note: equivalent to $2.55 billion in 2025) The sale, completed by October 2009, was in conjunction with Dow Chemical Company's takeover of Rohm and Haas.

In June 2016, a wall at the Morton Salt storage facility at 1308 N. Elston Avenue, in Chicago, collapsed and tons of salt and brick spilled suddenly onto several cars belonging to a neighboring car dealership. No one was injured and investigation initially found that the salt was piled too high. Repairs to part of the roof had also been neglected.

On April 30, 2021, K+S Aktiengesellschaft sold its North and South American business units, including Morton Salt, to Stone Canyon Industry Holdings, Mark Demetree and affiliates for $3.2 billion. (Note: equivalent to $3.8 billion in 2025) The deal closed in April 2021. Following the acquisition, Morton Salt reduced its Chicago headquarters staff by approximately 40% as part of a strategic restructuring effort under new ownership in mid-2021.

In 2024, Morton Salt moved its headquarters to Overland Park, Kansas, and leased over 15 percent of a more than 300,600-square-foot (27,930 m^{2}) office building there in December 2024. In June 2025, Morton Salt announced a significant production increase with an expansion to be complete within 12–18 months. In November 2025, the company secured naming rights for a new Morton Amphitheater to open north of downtown Kansas City in 2026.

== Current overview ==
The Morton Salt Company's current headquarters office is in Overland Park, Kansas, where it leased significant office space at 40 Corporate Woods beginning in December 2024; the lease deal of more than ten years earned a 2025 CoStar "commercial lease of the year" Impact award, as judged by Kansas City real estate professionals. Before that, the company was based in the River Point building at 444 West Lake Street in Chicago, where it become the first tenant in December 2016. Its previous headquarters was at 123 North Wacker Drive. Prior to its acquisition in 1999, the firm's corporate headquarters was at 100 North Riverside Plaza (later the headquarters of Boeing) and before that at 110 North Wacker Drive and 208 West Washington Street. In July 2021, Morton Salt underwent significant restructuring following its acquisition by Stone Canyon Industries, which resulted in a workforce reduction of approximately 40% at its Chicago headquarters, affecting about 120 staff members.

As of June 2025, Morton Salt says it produces about 30 million tons of salt annually with twelve rock salt facilities, eleven evaporated and solar salt plants, fourteen packaging plants, and hundreds of distribution facilities. As of 2017, Morton operated a research & development laboratory in Elgin, Illinois, and had six underground mines, five solar evaporation plants, and five packaging facilities across the United States, Canada, and The Bahamas.

=== Logo and advertising ===
Morton Salt's logo features the "Morton Salt Girl", a young girl walking in the rain with an opened umbrella and scattering salt behind her from a cylindrical container of table salt; this logo is considered to be one of the ten best-known advertising symbols in the United States. The company's logo and its motto, "When it rains, it pours", both originating in a 1914 advertising campaign, were developed to illustrate the point that Morton Salt was free flowing even in rainy weather. The company began adding magnesium carbonate as an absorbing agent to its table salt in 1911 to ensure that it poured freely.

The Morton Salt Girl, also known as the Umbrella Girl, has gone through seven different iterations, including updates in 1921, 1933, 1941, 1956, and 1968, and a "refresh" in 2014, the 100th anniversary of its creation. The company sells associated memorabilia and makes some of its vintage advertisements freely available. In 2005, the Morton Salt Girl was shown in MasterCard's "Icons" commercial during Super Bowl XXXIX, which depicts several advertising mascots having dinner together. The logo has its centennial in 2014, which was celebrated with 100 parties in 100 cities, Morton Salt Girl Centennial Scholarships to benefit certain fine arts and culinary arts students at the School of the Art Institute of Chicago and the Kendall College School of Culinary Arts, Morton Salt Girl day at Wrigley Field, Facebook and Instagram lookalike contests, and other activities. Also in 2014, the Morton Salt Girl was voted into the Advertising Week Walk of Fame on Madison Avenue in New York City; it is the first icon featuring a woman to be inducted.

=== Morton Arboretum ===
Morton Salt is the sponsor of the Morton Arboretum, a 1,700-acre (690 ha) botanical garden in Lisle, Illinois. It was established by Joy Morton, the company's founder, in 1922 to encourage the display and study of shrubs, trees, and vines. About 300,000 visitors a year hike on miles of trails, and over 3,600 kinds of plants are displayed.

== In popular culture ==
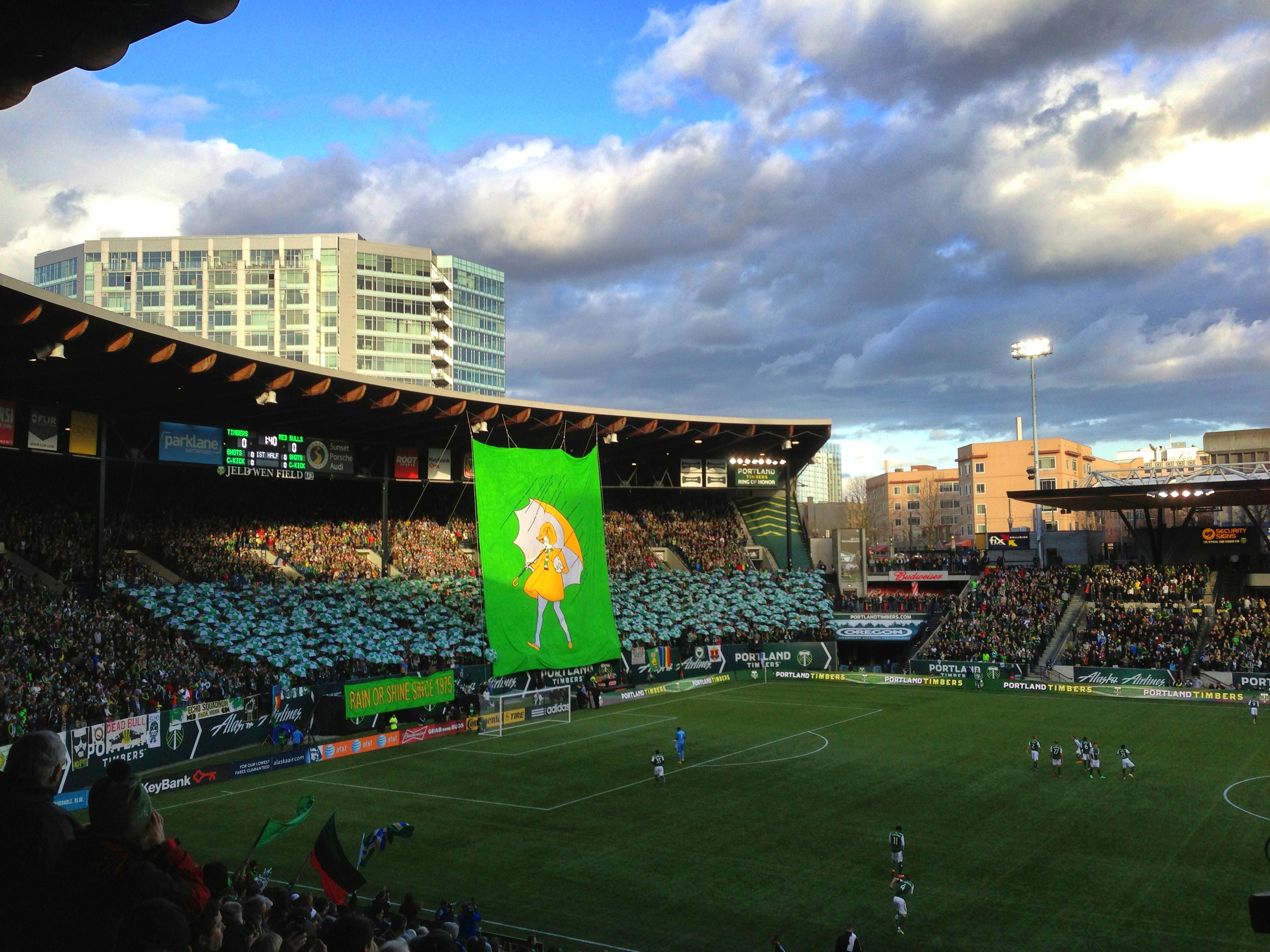
Portland Timbers fans displaying the Morton Salt Girl

In the 1989 Cheers episode "Feeble Attraction", Norm was planning to finally fire Doris, who he hired as a secretary for his failing painting company. She came into Cheers with a rain coat and umbrella leading Frasier to comment "You're going to fire the Morton Salt Girl".

In the 2011 episode "The Fight" of the television series Parks and Recreation, Morton Salt is one of three products publicly endorsed by the character Ron Swanson (Nick Offerman).

The Timbers Army used the Morton Salt Girl in a large tifo display and T-shirts during the kickoff match to the 2013 Major League Soccer season between the Portland Timbers and the New York Red Bulls.

As part of their "Walk Her Walk" campaign, Morton Salt funded the development of the music video "The One Moment" by the band OK Go, released on November 23, 2016.

== See also ==
- History of salt
- Iodized salt
- Sodium chloride
