= Morton Amphitheater =

Music venue in Riverside, Missouri

- Location in Missouri Location in the United States
- Address: 6150 NW Music Blvd
- Location: Riverside, Missouri, U.S.
- Coordinates: 39°9′44.52″N 94°39′5.29″W
- Owner: Live Nation Entertainment
- Capacity: 16,000

Construction
- Opened: June 3, 2026; 2 months ago
- Cost: $135 million

Website
- www.mortonamphitheater.com

The Morton Amphitheater is an outdoor live music venue in Riverside, Missouri, part of the Kansas City metropolitan area. Morton Salt headquartered in nearby Overland Park has naming rights to the 16,000-seat facility which is owned and operated by Live Nation.

The venue opened on June 3, 2026, with a performance by Kesha as part of her Freedom Tour.
