= Iodised salt =

Table salt preparation with iodide salts added

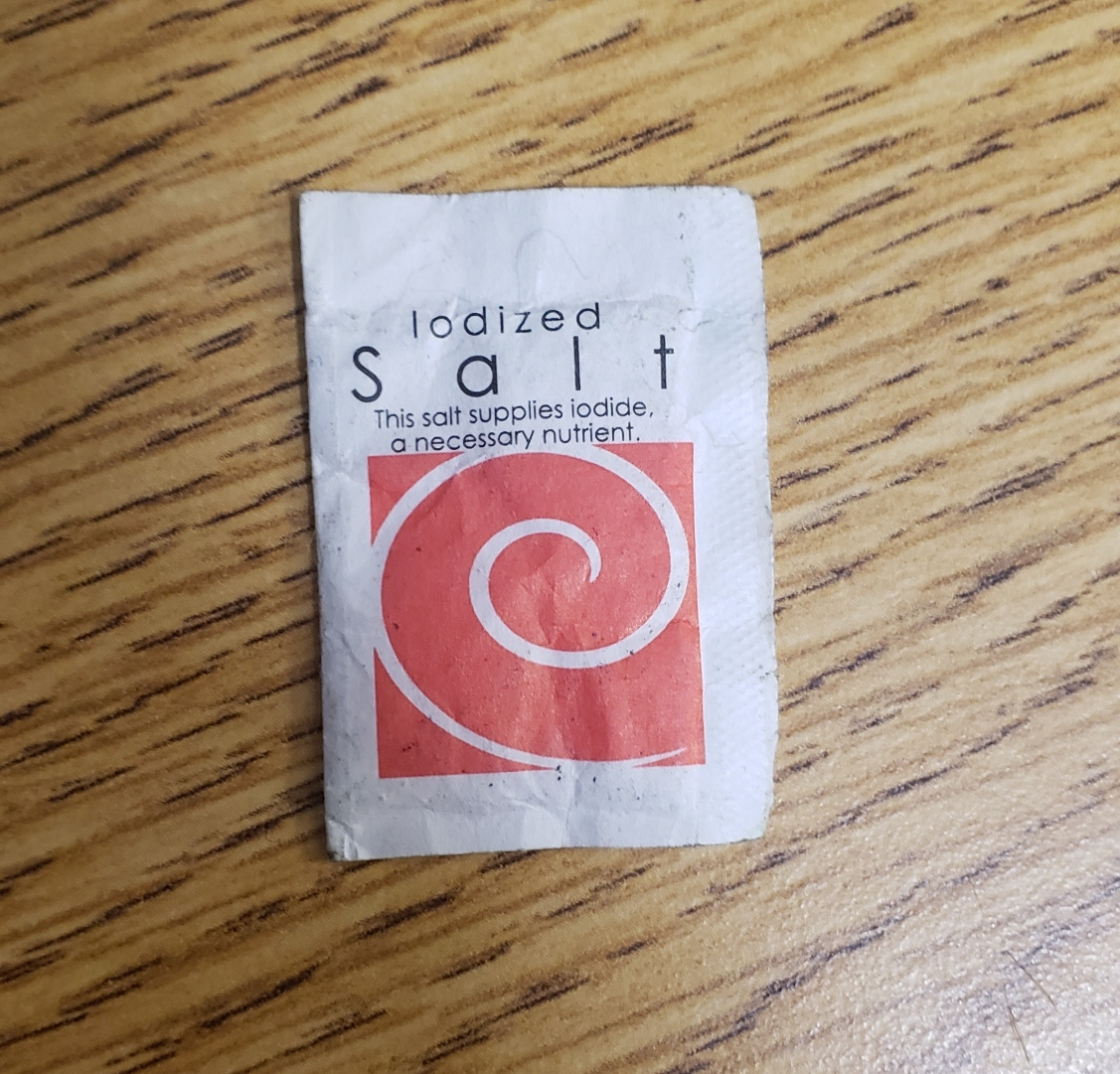
An example of a commonly distributed packet of iodized salt

Iodized salt (also spelled iodised salt) is table salt mixed with a minuscule amount of various iodine salts. The ingestion of iodine prevents iodine deficiency. Worldwide, iodine deficiency affects about two billion people and is the leading preventable cause of intellectual and developmental disabilities. Deficiency also causes thyroid gland problems, including endemic goitre. In many countries, iodine deficiency is a major public health problem that can be cheaply addressed by purposely adding small amounts of iodine to the sodium chloride salt.

Iodine is a micronutrient and dietary mineral that is naturally present in the food supply in some regions (especially near sea coasts) but is generally quite rare in the Earth's crust. Where natural levels of iodine in the soil are low and vegetables do not take up the iodine, iodine added to salt provides the small but essential amount of iodine needed by humans.

An opened package of table salt with iodide may rapidly lose its iodine content in high temperature and high relative humidity conditions through the process of oxidation and iodine sublimation. Poor manufacturing techniques and storage processes can also lead to insufficient amounts of iodine in table salt.

== Chemistry, biochemistry, and nutritional aspects ==
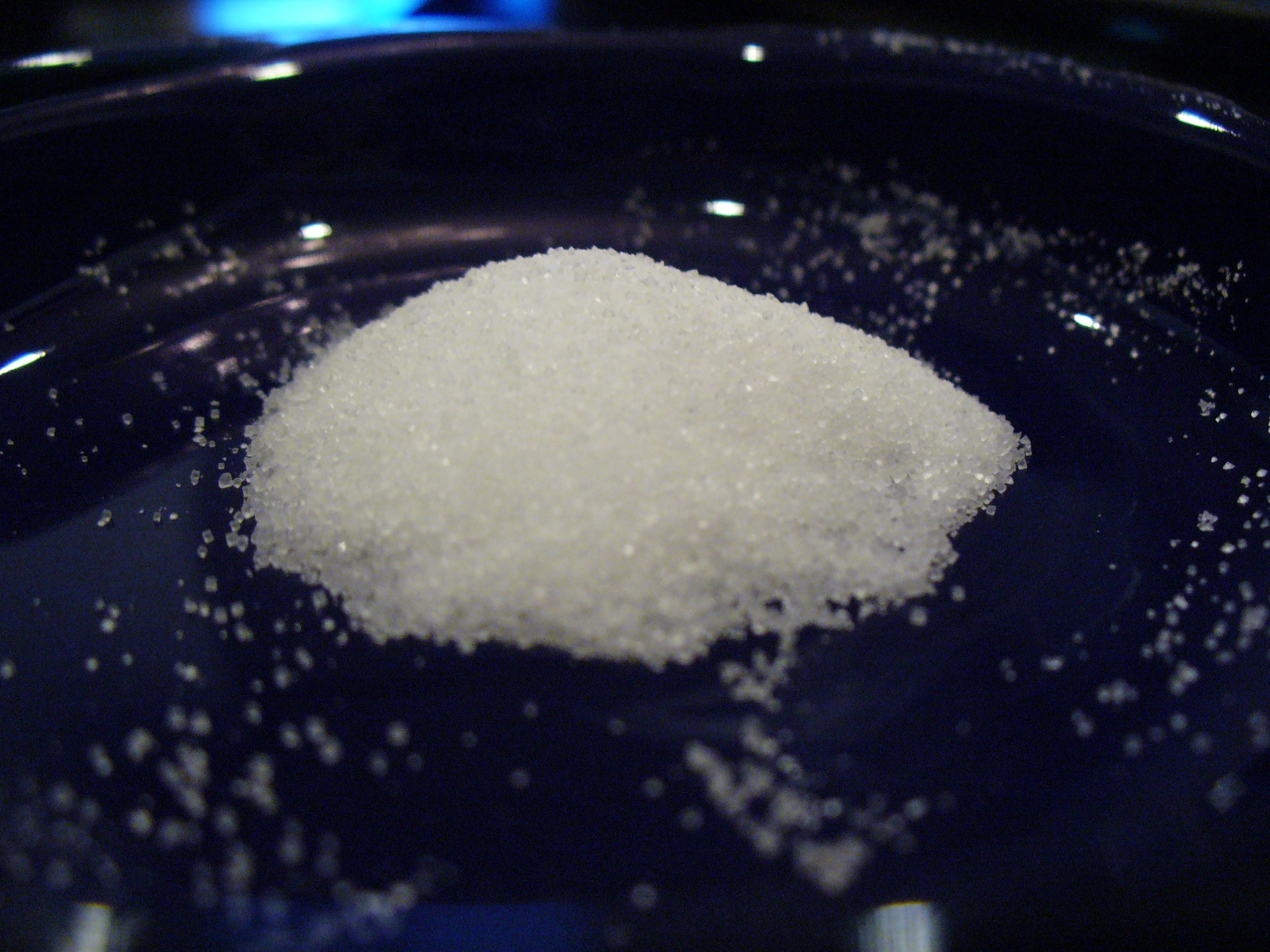
A pile of iodized salt

Four inorganic compounds are used as iodine sources, depending on the producer: potassium iodate, potassium iodide, sodium iodate, and sodium iodide. Any of these compounds supplies the body with the iodine required for the biosynthesis of thyroxine (T_{4}) and triiodothyronine (T_{3}) hormones by the thyroid gland. Animals also benefit from iodine supplements, and the hydrogen iodide derivative of ethylenediamine is the main supplement to livestock feed.

Salt is an effective vehicle for distributing iodine to the public because it does not spoil and is consumed in more predictable amounts than most other commodities. For example, the concentration of iodine in salt has gradually increased in Switzerland: 3.75 mg/kg in 1922, 7.5 mg/kg in 1962, 15 mg/kg in 1980, 20 mg/kg in 1998, and 25 mg/kg since 2014. These increases were found to improve iodine status in the general Swiss population.

Salt that is iodized with iodide may slowly lose its iodine content by exposure to excess air over long periods. Salts fortified with iodate are relatively stable to storage and heat; the main concern is reducing impurities in the salt itself, which can be removed relatively easily. Moisture accelerates the decomposition of iodate, but ceases to do so once reducing impurities are removed.

Contrary to popular assumptions, iodized salt cannot be used as a substitute for potassium iodide (KI) to protect a person's thyroid gland in the event of a nuclear emergency. There is not enough iodine in iodized salt to block the uptake of radioactive iodine by the thyroid.

== Production ==
Share of households consuming iodized salt

Edible salt can be iodized by spraying it with a potassium iodate or potassium iodide solution. 57 grams of potassium iodate, costing about US$1.15 (in 2006), is required to iodize a short ton (2,000 pounds) of salt. Optional additives include:

- Stabilizers such as dextrose (typically at about 0.04%) and sodium thiosulfate, which prevent potassium iodide from oxidizing and evaporating. These ingredients are not required for potassium iodate, which is commonly used globally for its increased stability, but is not approved by the US FDA.
- Anti-caking agents such as calcium silicate and sodium ferrocyanide, which prevent clumping.

== Public health initiatives ==
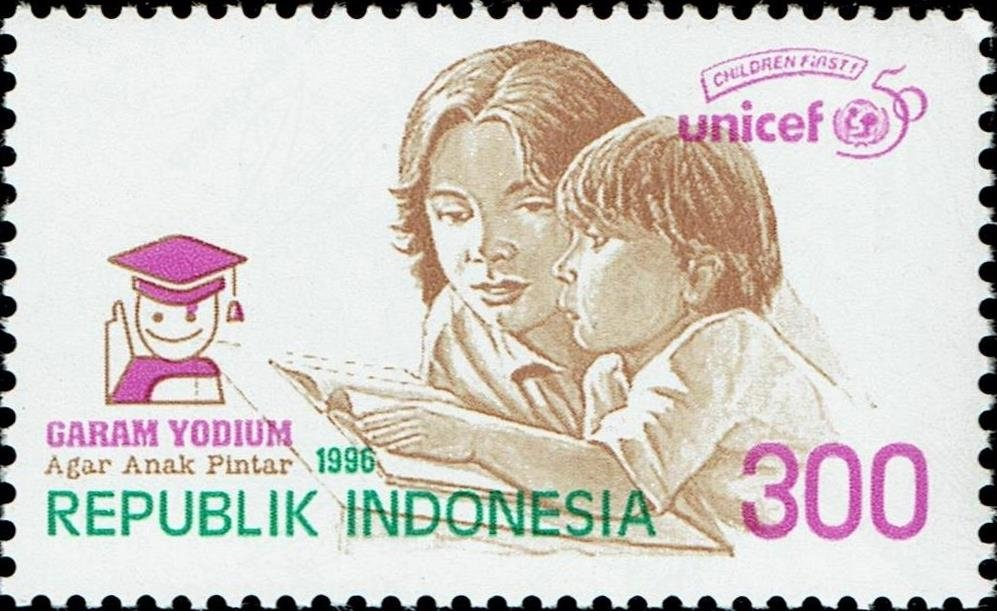
Promotion of iodized salt to children by UNICEF on a 1996 Indonesian postage stamp

Worldwide, iodine deficiency affects two billion people and is the leading preventable cause of intellectual and developmental disabilities. According to public health experts, iodization of salt may be the world's simplest and most cost-effective measure available to improve health, only costing US$0.05 per person per year. At the World Summit for Children in 1990, a goal was set to eliminate iodine deficiency by 2000. At that time, 25% of households consumed iodized salt, a proportion that increased to 66% by 2006.

Salt producers are often, although not always, supportive of government initiatives to iodize edible salt supplies. Opposition to iodization comes from small salt producers who are concerned about the added expense, private makers of iodine pills, concerns about promoting salt intake, and unfounded rumours that iodization causes AIDS or other illnesses.

The United States Food and Drug Administration recommends 150 micrograms (0.15 mg) of iodine per day for adults. While iodine is crucial, the FDA also recommends limiting overall sodium intake to less than 2,300 mg per day for adults, which is approximately 1 teaspoon of table salt.

=== Argentina ===
Since 8 May 1967 salt for human or animal use must be iodized, according to the Law 17,259.

=== Australia ===
Australian children were identified as being iodine deficient in a survey conducted between 2003 and 2004. As a result of this study the Australian Government mandated that all bread except "organic" bread must use iodized salt. There remains concern that this initiative is not sufficient for pregnant and lactating women.

=== Brazil ===
Iodine Deficiency Disorders were detected as a major public health issue by Brazilian authorities in the 1950s when about 20% of the population had a goitre. The National Agency for Sanitary Vigilance (ANVISA) is responsible for setting the mandatory iodine content of table salt. The Brazilian diet averages 12 g of table salt daily, more than twice the recommended value of 5 g daily. To avoid excess consumption of iodine, the iodizing of Brazilian table salt was reduced to 15–45 mg/kg in July 2013. Specialists criticized the move, saying that it would be better for the government to promote reduced salt intake, which would solve the iodine problem as well as reduce the incidence of high blood pressure.

=== Canada ===
For table and household use, salt sold to consumers in Canada must be iodized with 0.01% potassium iodide. Sea salt and salt sold for other purposes, such as pickling, may be sold uniodized.

=== China ===
Much of the Chinese population lives inland, far from sources of dietary iodine. In 1996, the Chinese Ministry of Public Health estimated that iodine deficiency was responsible for 10 million cases of intellectual developmental disorders in China. Chinese governments have held a legal monopoly on salt production since 119 BCE and began iodizing salt in the 1960s, but the reform and opening up in the 1980s led to widespread smuggling of non-iodized salt from private producers. In the inland province of Ningxia, only 20% of the salt consumed was sold by the China National Salt Industry Corporation. The Chinese government responded by cracking down on smuggled salt, establishing a salt police with 25,000 officers to enforce the salt monopoly. Consumption of iodized salt reached 90% of the Chinese population by 2000.

=== India ===
India and all of its states ban the sale of non-iodized salt for human consumption. However, implementation and enforcement of this policy are imperfect; a 2009 survey found that 9% of households used non-iodized salt and that another 20% used insufficiently iodized salt.

Iodized salt was introduced to India in the late 1950s. Public awareness was increased by special programs and initiatives, both governmental and non-governmental. Currently, iodine deficiency is only present in a few isolated regions which are still unreachable. In India, some people use Himalayan rock salt. Rock salt however is low in iodine and should be consumed only when other iodine-rich foods are in the diet.

=== Iran ===
A national program with iodized salt started in 1992. A national survey of 1990 revealed the prevalence of iodine deficiency to be 20–80% in different parts of Iran indicating a major public health problem. Central provinces, far from the sea, had the highest prevalence of iodine deficiency. The national salt enrichment program was very successful. The prevalence of goiter in Iran dropped dramatically. The national survey in 1996 reported that 40% of boys and 50% of girls have goiter. The 3rd national survey in 2001 showed that the total goiter rate is 9.8%. In 2007, the 4th national survey was conducted 17 years after iodized salt consumption by Iranian households. In this study, the total goiter rate was 5.7%.

Concerns of iodine deficiency have raised over recent years due to the consumption of non-iodized salts especially sea salt which is strongly suggested by traditional medicine workers in Iran, many of whom lack a pertinent academic background.

=== Kazakhstan ===
Kazakhstan, a country in Central Eurasia in which local food supplies seldom contain sufficient iodine, has drastically reduced iodine deficiency through salt iodization programs. Campaigns by the government and non-profit organisations to educate the public about the benefits of iodized salt began in the mid-1990s, with iodization of edible salt becoming legally mandatory in 2002.

=== Malaysia ===
Salt being sold in the country must be iodized which is forced under the Food Regulation 1985 from 30 September 2020.

=== Nepal ===
The Salt Trading Corporation has been distributing iodized Salt in Nepal since 1963. 98% of the Population uses iodized Salt. Utilising non-iodized salt for human consumption is prohibited. Salt costs about US$0.27 a kilo.

=== Philippines ===
On December 20, 1995, Philippine President Fidel V. Ramos signed Republic Act 8172: An Act for Salt Iodization Nationwide (ASIN). However, local production of non-iodized salt continues.

=== Romania ===
According to the 568/2002 law signed by the Romanian parliament and republished in 2009, since 2002 iodized salt has been distributed mandatory in the whole country. It is used mandatory on the market for household consumption, in bakeries, and for pregnant women. iodized salt is optional though for animal consumption and the food industry, although widely used. The salt iodization process has to ensure a minimum of 30mg iodine/kg of salt.

=== South Africa ===
The South African government instructed that all salt for sale would be iodized after December 12, 1995.

=== Switzerland ===
Switzerland was the first country to introduce iodized salt, in the world's first food fortification program.

In the early 20th century, goitre was endemic in most Swiss cantons. Iodine was recognized to have an effect on goitre, but it was not until Heinrich Hunziker, a GP in Adliswil, argued that the necessary dose of iodine was minute (with larger amounts causing overdose issues), and another doctor, Otto Bayard, conducted successful experiments based on this idea, that the theory of goitre as iodine deficiency came to be accepted. Learning of Hunziker's theory, Bayard conducted experiments with iodized salt containing only tiny amounts of iodine in villages badly affected by goitre. The success of these led, starting in 1922, to the adoption of iodized salt throughout the Swiss cantons.

Today, iodized salt continues to be used in Switzerland, where historically endemic iodine deficiency has been eradicated.

=== Syria ===
In the late 1980s, a Syrian endocrinologist named Samir Ouaess conducted research on hypothyroidism and noticed that 90 percent of Syrians suffer from hypothyroidism, 50 percent suffer from health problems as a result of Thyroid deficiency, and 10 percent of students suffer from a decline in their academic level due to that problem. Dr. Ouaess linked these results with the fact that natural drinking water sources in Syria do not contain enough minerals. He presented the result of that study to the Syrian Ministry of Health. After that, adding iodine to salt became almost mandatory till 2021, when the Syrian government cancelled the iodization of salt as a result of economic problems related to economic sanctions.

=== United Kingdom ===
Iodized salt is not readily available in the UK, where table salt forms a low proportion of salt consumed and there exists a conflict of interest with the salt-reduction campaign, which aims to reduce salt consumption further still.

UK milk had historically provided an alternative avenue for iodine intake, for which it is indirectly fortified through cattle feed. Iodization of cattle feed was originally started in the 1930s to improve cow health. Iodophor disinfectants used in milking parlours also serve as a source of iodine for cows. Subsequent dairy promotion programs increased the population's milk consumption, creating an "accidental public health triumph" by increasing the population's iodine consumption and nearly eliminating goitre. However, several factors threaten this triumph: 2005 limits on iodine content of animal feed, organic milk (which contains lower amounts of iodine because of restrictions on mineral additions), and an overall reduction in milk intake. Several studies between 1995 and 2020 have found iodine deficiency in British teenagers and pregnant women.

=== United States ===
Iodized salt is not mandatory in the United States, but it is widely available.

In the early 20th century, goiters were especially prevalent in the region around the Great Lakes and the Pacific Northwest. David Murray Cowie, a professor of paediatrics at the University of Michigan, led the United States to adopt the Swiss practice of adding sodium iodide or potassium iodide to table and cooking salt. On May 1, 1924, iodized salt was sold commercially in Michigan. By the fall of 1924, Morton Salt Company began distributing iodized salt nationally.

A 2017 study found that introducing iodized salt in 1924 raised the IQ of one-quarter of the population most deficient in iodine. These findings "can explain roughly one decade's worth of the upward trend in IQ in the United States (the Flynn effect)". The study also found "a large increase in thyroid-related deaths following the countrywide adoption of iodized salt, which affected mostly older individuals in localities with a high prevalence of iodine deficiency" between 1910–1960, a high short-term price for iodization's long-running benefits. (Note: "Individuals in whom the chronic iodine deficiency has induced thyroid hyperplasia and goitre with autonomous thyroid follicular cells may respond to excessive intake with resultant hyperthyroidism." A similar short term increase in deaths happened in the UK with the (unintentional) iodization of milk, peaking in 1931–1940.) A 2013 study found a gradual increase in average intelligence of 1 standard deviation, 15 points in iodine-deficient areas and 3.5 points nationally after the introduction of iodized salt.

A 2018 paper found that the nationwide distribution of iodine-fortified salt increased incomes by 11%, labour force participation by 0.68 percentage points, and full-time work by 0.9 percentage points. According to the study, "These impacts were largely driven by changes in the economic outcomes of young women. In later adulthood, both men and women had higher family incomes due to iodization."

== No-additive salts for canning and pickling ==
In contrast to table salt, which often contains iodide as well as anti-caking ingredients, special canning and pickling salt is made for producing the brine to be used in pickling vegetables and other foodstuffs. Contrary to popular assumptions, however, iodized salt affects neither colour, taste, nor consistency of pickles.

Processed food from the US almost universally does not use iodized salt, raising concerns about possible deficiency. On the other hand, processed food from Thailand contribute sufficient iodine to most of the population.

== Other fortification ==
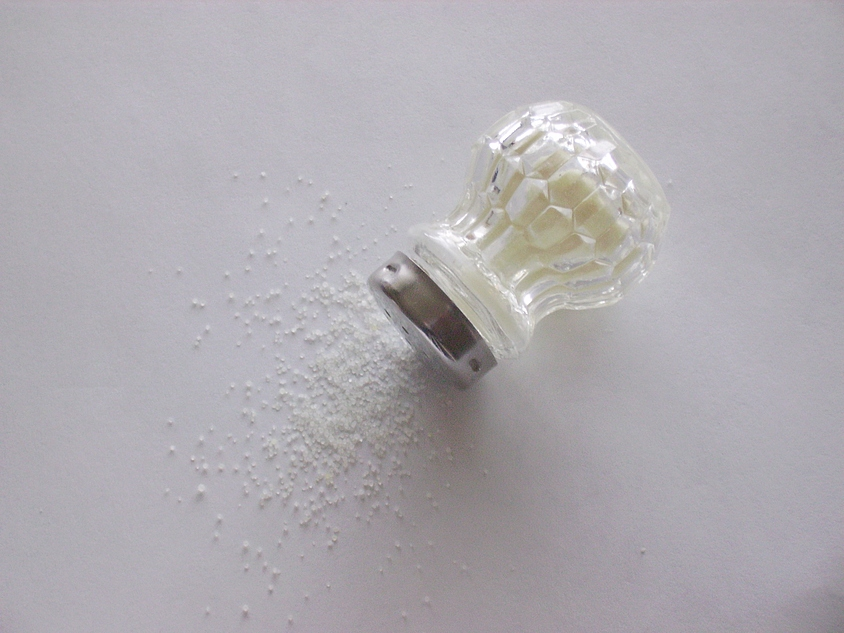
iodized salt with folic acid and fluorine. The folic acid gives a light yellow color to the salt.

=== Double-fortified salt ===
Salt can also be double-fortified with iron and iodine. The iron is microencapsulated with stearin to prevent it from reacting with the iodine in the salt. Providing iron in addition to iodine in the convenient delivery vehicle of salt, it could serve as a sustainable approach to combating both iodine and iron deficiency disorders in areas where both deficiencies are prevalent.

Adding iron to iodized salt is complicated by several chemical, technical, and organoleptic issues. Since a viable DFS premix became available for scale-up in 2001, a body of scientific literature has been emerging to support the DFS initiative including studies conducted in Ghana, India, Côte d'Ivoire, Kenya and Morocco.

=== Fluoride ===
In some countries, table salt is treated with potassium fluoride to enhance dental health.

=== Diethylcarbamazine ===
In India and China, diethylcarbamazine has been added to salt to combat lymphatic filariasis.

== See also ==
- Basil Hetzel
- Enriched flour, an analogous function to "enriched salt"
- History of salt
- Lugol's iodine
- Water fluoridation, a similar public health intervention
- Food fortification
