= Judith Jones =

American writer and editor (1924–2017)

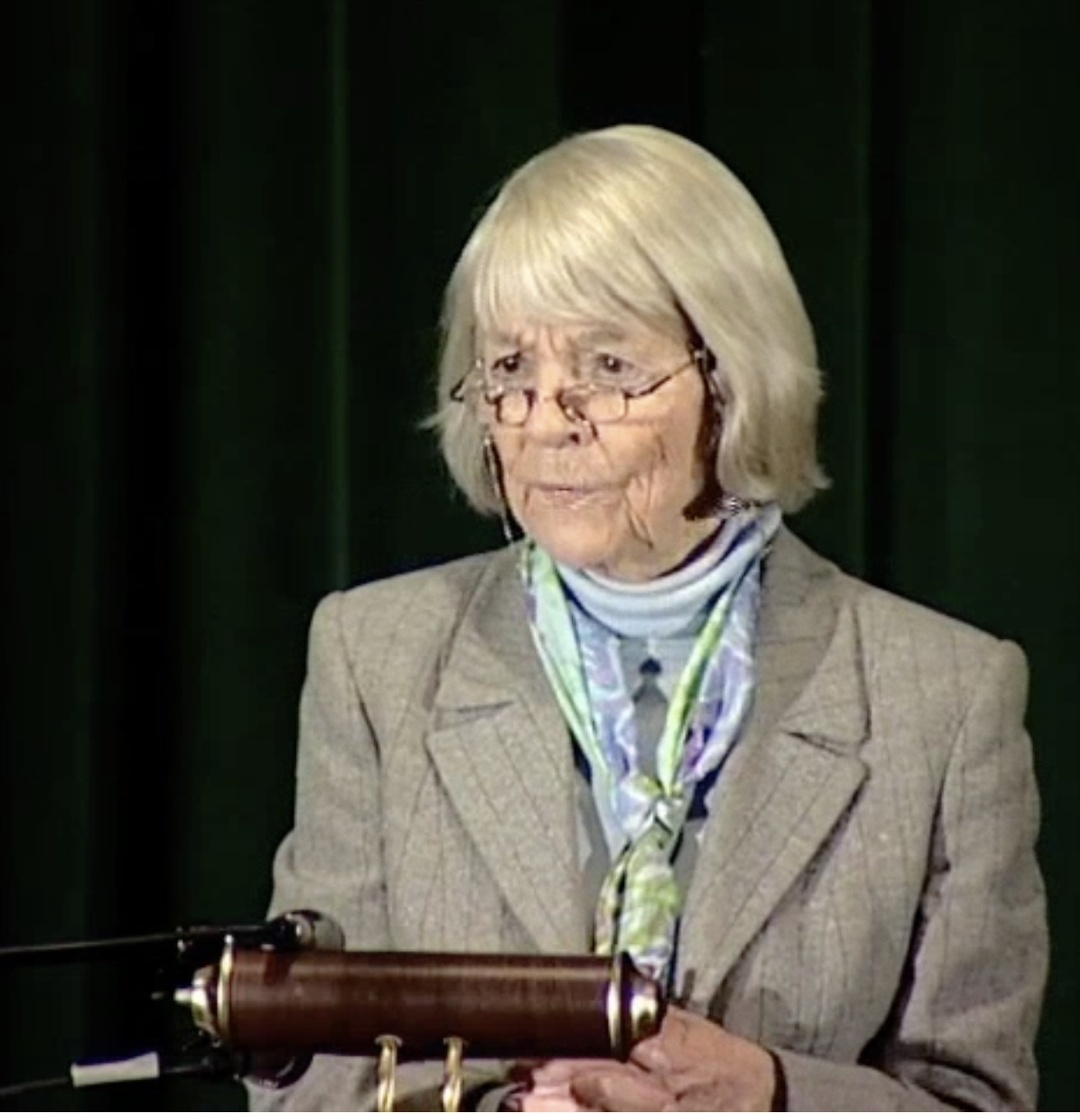
- Jones at the Library of Congress in 2007
- Born: Judith Bailey; March 10, 1924; New York City, U.S.
- Died: August 2, 2017 (aged 93); Walden, Vermont, U.S.
- Education: Brearley School; Bennington College
- Occupations: Writer, editor
- Spouse: Richard "Dick" Evan Jones (m. 1951; died 1996)

Judith Jones (née Bailey; March 10, 1924 – August 2, 2017) was an American writer and editor who championed Simone Beck, Louisette Bertholle and Julia Child's Mastering the Art of French Cooking. She retired as senior editor and vice president at Alfred A. Knopf in 2011 and fully retired in 2013 after more than 60 years at the company.

Jones was also a cookbook author and memoirist. She won multiple lifetime achievement awards, including the James Beard Foundation Lifetime Achievement Award in 2006. Later in her life she was revealed to have rescued the English translation of The Diary of Anne Frank from the reject pile.

== Early life and education ==
Jones was born Judith Bailey on March 10, 1924, to Phyllis (nee Hedley) and Charles Bailey. Her father was a lawyer. She grew up in Manhattan and had a sister, Susan. She attended the Brearley School and graduated from Bennington College in 1945 with a degree in English.

== Career ==
=== Editor ===
Jones worked for Doubleday, first in New York City and then in Paris, where she read and recommended The Diary of a Young Girl, by Anne Frank, pulling it out of the rejection pile. Jones recalled that she came across Frank's work in a slush pile of material that had been rejected by other publishers; she was struck by a photograph of the girl on the cover of an advance copy of the French edition. "I read it all day," she noted. "When my boss returned, I told him, 'We have to publish this book.' He said, 'What? That book by that kid?'" She brought the diary to the attention of Doubleday's New York office. "I made the book quite important because I was so taken with it, and I felt it would have a real market in America. It's one of those seminal books that will never be forgotten," Jones said.

Jones joined Knopf in 1957 as an assistant to Blanche Knopf and as an editor; as an editor she worked primarily on translations of French writers such as Albert Camus and Jean-Paul Sartre. Jones's relationship with Julia Child began when Jones became interested in the manuscript of Simone Beck, Louisette Bertholle and Child's Mastering the Art of French Cooking, which had been rejected by a publishing house. After her years in Paris, Jones had moved to New York, where she was frustrated with the ingredients and recipes commonly available in the U.S. Jones said of the book, "This was the book I had been searching for," and she got it published. In America's postwar years, home cooking was dominated by packaged and frozen food, with an emphasis on ease and speed.

After the success of Child's cookbook, Jones continued to expand the resource options for American home cooks. "I got so excited by Julia's book and what it did for making people better cooks, and the tools that you needed to make it really work in an American city or small town, and I thought, If we could do this for French food, for heavens' sake, let's start doing it for other exotic cuisines!" Jones recalled. "I used the word "exotic," and that meant the Middle East with Claudia Roden, it meant better Indian cooking with Madhur Jaffrey."

After working with Edna Lewis on The Taste of Country Cooking, Jones focused more on American regional cooking.

Major culinary authors Jones brought into print include Child, Lidia Bastianich, James Beard, Marion Cunningham, Rosie Daley, Edward Giobbi, Marcella Hazan, Madhur Jaffrey, Irene Kuo, Edna Lewis, Joan Nathan, Scott Peacock, Jacques Pépin, Claudia Roden, and Nina Simonds. The 18-book Knopf Cooks American series was Jones' creation.

Jones was also the longtime editor of noted authors John Updike, Anne Tyler, John Hersey, Elizabeth Bowen, Peter Taylor, and William Maxwell.

She retired as senior editor and vice president at Alfred A. Knopf in 2011 and fully retired in 2013 after more than 60 years at the company.

=== Author ===
Jones wrote three books with her husband, Evan, and wrote three on her own after his death: one on cooking for one person; a memoir of her life and food; and a cookbook for food that can be shared with dogs.

Jones contributed to Vogue, Saveur, Bon Appétit, Departures, and Gourmet magazines. In 2006, she was awarded the James Beard Foundation Lifetime Achievement Award.

She was portrayed by American actress Erin Dilly in the 2009 film Julie & Julia, and Fiona Glascott in the 2022 series Julia.

“Learning to like cooking alone is an ongoing process. But the alternative is worse.”

"For a long time, the women – and they were usually women – who wrote about food were treated as second-class citizens. All because they cook! I think that's opened up. A good writer gets some good assignments, and they're treated better somehow. It just takes time."

== Life and death ==
Jones lived in Paris after college, where she met her husband and collaborator, Richard "Dick" Evan Jones (died 1996). The couple married in 1951 and had two adopted children. She retired from Knopf after a 65-year career in 2013.

Jones died of complications from Alzheimer's disease at age 93 on August 2, 2017, in Walden, Vermont.

== Awards ==
=== Winner ===
- (2006) James Beard Foundation Lifetime Achievement Award
- (2017) James Beard Foundation Cookbook Hall of Fame

=== Nominee ===
- (2010) James Beard: General Cooking – The Pleasures of Cooking For One

=== Misc ===
Cookbooks written or edited by Judith Jones that received James Beard Awards:

- (1983) The Book of Bread by Judith Jones and Evan Jones. Award: Single Subject.
- (1993) Peppers: A Story of Hot Pursuits by Amal Naj and edited by Judith Jones. Award: Writing on Food
- (1995) Jewish Cooking in America by Joan Nathan and edited by Judith Jones. Award: Food of the Americas
- (2000) Julia and Jacques Cooking at Home by Julia Child, Jacques Pépin and edited by Judith Jones. Award: General
- (2000) A Spoonful of Ginger by Nina Simonds and edited by Judith Jones. Award: Healthy Focus
- (2002) Jacques Pepin Celebrates by Jacques Pépin and edited by Judith Jones. Award: Entertaining & Special Occasions
- (2006) The New American Cooking by Joan Nathan and edited by Judith Jones. Award: Food of the Americas
- (2006) Spices of Life: Simple and Delicious Recipes for Great Health by Nina Simonds and edited by Judith Jones. Award: Healthy Focus

== In popular culture ==
- Actress Erin Dilly played Jones in the film Julie & Julia, which starred Meryl Streep as Julia Child and Amy Adams as Julie Powell.
- In the TV series, Julia, based on the life of Julia Child, Jones is portrayed by Fiona Glascott.

== Works ==
- Knead It, Punch It, Bake It!: Make Your Own Bread, with Evan Jones, illustrated by Lauren Jarrett (for children, Thomas Y. Crowell Co., October 1981)
- The Book of Bread, with Evan Jones (Harper & Row, 1982)
- The L.L. Bean Game and Fish Cookbook, with Angus Cameron, illustrated by Bill Elliott (Random House, October 12, 1983)
- The L.L. Bean Book of New New England Cookery, with Evan Jones (Random House, October 12, 1987) (reprinted as The Book of New New England Cookery, illustrated by Lauren Jarrett, in paperback by UPNE, April 1, 2001) ISBN 1584651318
- The Tenth Muse: My Life in Food (Knopf, October 23, 2007)
- The Pleasures of Cooking for One (Knopf, September 29, 2009)
- Love Me, Feed Me: Sharing with Your Dog the Everyday Good Food You Cook and Enjoy (Knopf, October 28, 2014)

== See also ==
- Cuisine of the United States § Modern cuisine
