= Freetown, Orange County, Virginia =

Freetown is a freedmen's town in Orange County, Virginia founded by formerly enslaved people, one of multiple Freetowns created in Central Virginia during the Reconstruction Era. One of the founders was Chester Lewis, who was born enslaved around 1830 on a plantation in Lahore, Virginia.

Village life was "communal", according to Phil Audibert. "Your child was everybody's child, and your parents were everybody's parents. If you borrowed a cup of sugar, you returned two." Life in the community was detailed by Edna Lewis in her 1976 The Taste of Country Cooking.

An annual Revival celebration is held in August at the Bethel Baptist Church in nearby Unionville. In 2024, an historical marker honoring Edna Lewis was installed at the site.

== Notable people ==
- Edna Lewis, granddaughter of Chester Lewis

== See also ==
- List of Freedmen's towns
