= In Pursuit of Flavor =

1988 cookbook by Edna Lewis

In Pursuit of Flavor is a 1988 cookbook by Edna Lewis. It is included in the James Beard Foundation Cookbook Hall of Fame.

== Development and publication history ==
The book follows up Lewis's 1976 The Taste of Country Cooking. A 2019 edition includes a foreword by Mashama Bailey. It is illustrated by Louisa Jones Waller.

== Description ==
Similarly to The Taste of Country Cooking, In Pursuit of Flavor contains seasonal menus illustrated with line drawings. It is less of a memoir and closer to a conventional cookbook usable by modern cooks as the recipes and ingredients are not as tied to the terroir of Freetown, Virginia, where Lewis grew up.

The book calls out specific heirloom vegetables and heritage breeds; according to Paul Fehribach, writing in The Takeout, Lewis was among the first recipe developers to acknowledge that one type of cucumber or breed of chicken might not produce the same results as another. Fehribach calls it "arguably Edna Lewis' most important book, as it most expansively lays out her approach to cooking".

== Recognition ==
The book is included in the James Beard Foundation Cookbook Hall of Fame. The Washington Post included it in a list of cookbooks "worth reading beyond the recipes".
