= Bear Creek, Texas (Dallas County) =

Bear Creek is an area of Irving, Texas which was once a freedmen's town.

== History ==
A mix of white people, enslaved black people, and free black people moved to the areas around the creek that gives the area its name in the late 1850s. Jim Green, a formerly enslaved person, became Bear Creek's first Black landowner in 1878. Other Black families began to move to the area, and Bear Creek became a predominantly Black community. Bear Creek's first church, Shady Grove Christian Methodist Episcopal Church, was established in 1884. Also in 1884, Bear Creek's Freedom School was founded on a piece of land donated by Jim Green, with materials donated by other community members.

In 1890, the Allen Chapel AME Church was founded. Two other area churches were founded in the 20th century, the Ben Washington Baptist Church in 1941 and the Evergreen Baptist Church in 1948.

In 1903, the city of Irving was founded east of Bear Creek. For much of the 20th century, Bear Creek did not receive the services and amenities provided to Irving residents. Bear Creek lacked utilities including gas, electricity, and water service, which forced them to either dig wells or travel to the city of Irving for water.

Bear Creek's Freedom School later became a part of the Dallas County Common School District, at which point it was called the Sowers Colored School No. 2. After a 1949 fire burned the Sowers School down, the Bear Creek community raised money to build a new school. Still, the new school remained severely under resourced, leading the community to request more support from the county. After their request was denied, the community picketed for fair funding, enlisting the help of the NAACP.

The school would become a part of the Irving Independent School District in 1955. While the 1954 ruling of Brown vs. Board of Education declared school segregation unconstitutional, many school districts, including the Irving Independent School District, did not comply until forced to do so by the 1964 Civil Rights Act. The Irving Independent School District began integration in 1966. Following integration, many of the original Bear Creek schools closed, and Black students in the area were bussed to other Irving schools. Many community members mourned the loss of these schools as a loss of a core part of their community.

In 1964, Bear Creek residents formed he Bear Creek Improvement Association to advocate for civil rights and the annexation of Bear Creek into the city of Irving. Not all Bear Creek residents were in support of annexation, fearing loss of property and the impact of new building codes. The city of Irving annexed Bear Creek in 1969.

Bear Creek resident Jackie Mae Howard became the first Black woman to serve on the Irving City Council following her election in 1977.

== Legacy ==
As the population of the DFW metroplex grew, Irving and Bear Creek also saw major growth. Many of the new residents were white, and the community was no longer a predominantly Black enclave.

The history of Bear Creek is commemorated at the Jackie Townsell Bear Creek Heritage Center, which features several historical museums and recreation spaces.

== See also ==
- List of freedmen's towns
