= Humble Spirit =

Restaurant in McMinnville, Oregon, U.S.

- Interactive map of Humble Spirit

Restaurant information
- Location: McMinnville, Oregon, United States
- Coordinates: 45.2101°N 123.1953°W
- Website: humblespirit.love

Humble Spirit is a farm-to-table restaurant in McMinnville, Oregon, United States. The business made Sarah Schafer a semifinalist in the Best Chef: Northwest & Pacific category of the James Beard Foundation Awards in 2025.
