= World Journalism Preparatory School =

Public school in New York City

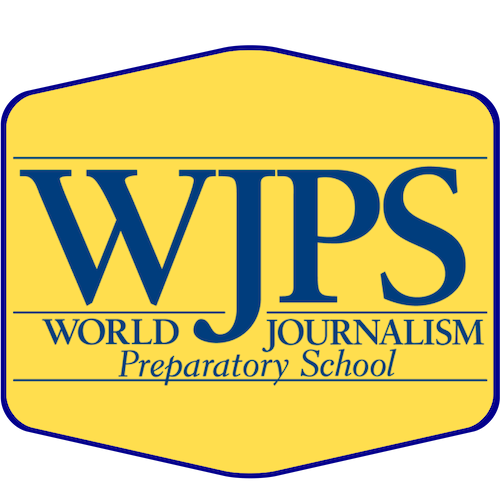

Location
- 34-65 192nd Street; Queens, New York 11358; United States
- 40°45′54″N 73°47′23″W

Information
- Other name: WJPS
- School type: Public
- School district: Community School District 25 (NYC Department of Education)
- Superintendent: Elaine Lindsey
- School number: Q285
- School code: 25Q285
- Principal: Dr. Janine Polla Werner
- Grades: 6–12
- Enrollment: 634
- Campus: The Adrien Block Campus
- Athletics conference: PSAL
- Website: wjps.org

The World Journalism Preparatory School (WJPS) (25Q285) is a public high school in Flushing, New York, United States. The school is part the Adrien Block Campus, and shares space with IS 25 Adrien Block School (25Q025) and P233 (a school for disabled children).

== History and origin ==
The high school opened in 2004 and later opened a middle school in the same building.

Cynthia Schneider was the founding principal and held the role from 2004 to 2016.

Dr. Janine Werner became principal in 2017.

In 2016 Ian Millman, the school's first dean of discipline and academic intervention specialist, was found to have engaged in sexual impropriety with a WJPS student. The student was in her sophomore when Ian Millman first behaved inappropriately towards her. He was placed on administrative leave in 2014, and surrendered his state teaching license in 2015.

== Extra-curricular activities and after-school clubs ==
=== Sports teams ===
All of WJPS sports teams are via Public Schools Athletic League. However all students sports teams are from Francis Lewis High School.

=== After-school program ===
WJPS offers a free after-school program through the Greater Ridgewood Youth Council (GRYC). It is funded by the Schools Out New York City (SONYC) after-school framework for middle schools from NYC Department of Youth & Community Development.) It started in the 2014–2015 school year. This free high quality after-school program at IS25Q and World Journalism Preparatory School is only for grades 6-8 (students in World Journalism Preparatory School in grades 9-10 can join as youth employment). Students are given free snacks and homework help. They are then given activities aligned to the Common Core. Activities include Art/Drama Club, STEM Club, Chess Club, Guitar/Music Club, Builder's Club, Team Sports Club, Video Game Club, and Fitness Club. The program runs Monday through Friday, from 2:30 to 5:30pm.
