= Babylon, Texas =

Ghost town in Texas, US

Babylon is a freedmen's ghost town in Navarro County, Texas, United States. Settled in the 1890s, it was named for the ancient Babylon. It was a church and school, founded c. 1895 and by 1900, respectively. Most moved from the community following World War II, and it was abandoned by the early 1990s.
