= Almond pressed duck =

Cantonese duck dish

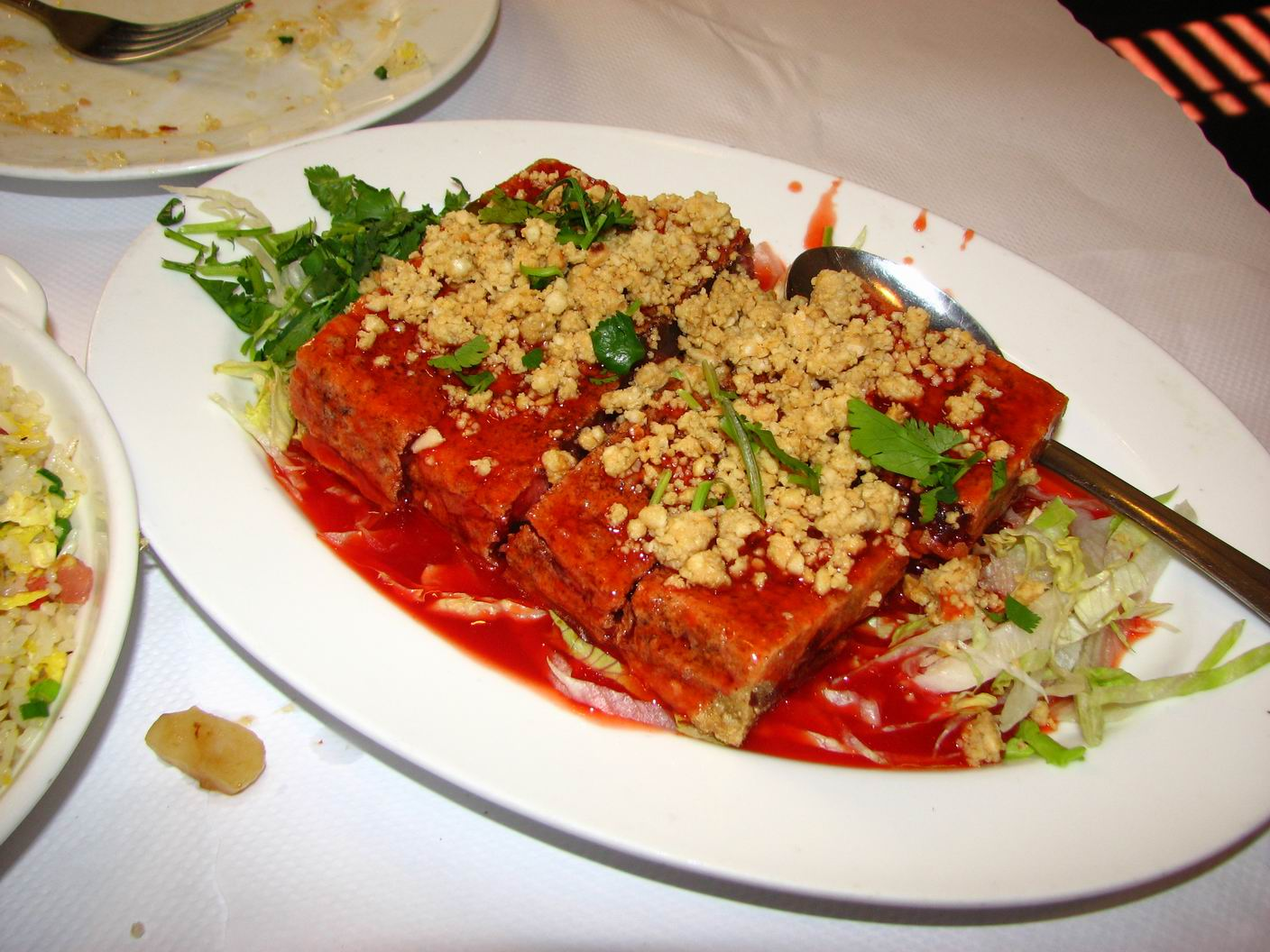
Almond pressed duck at a restaurant

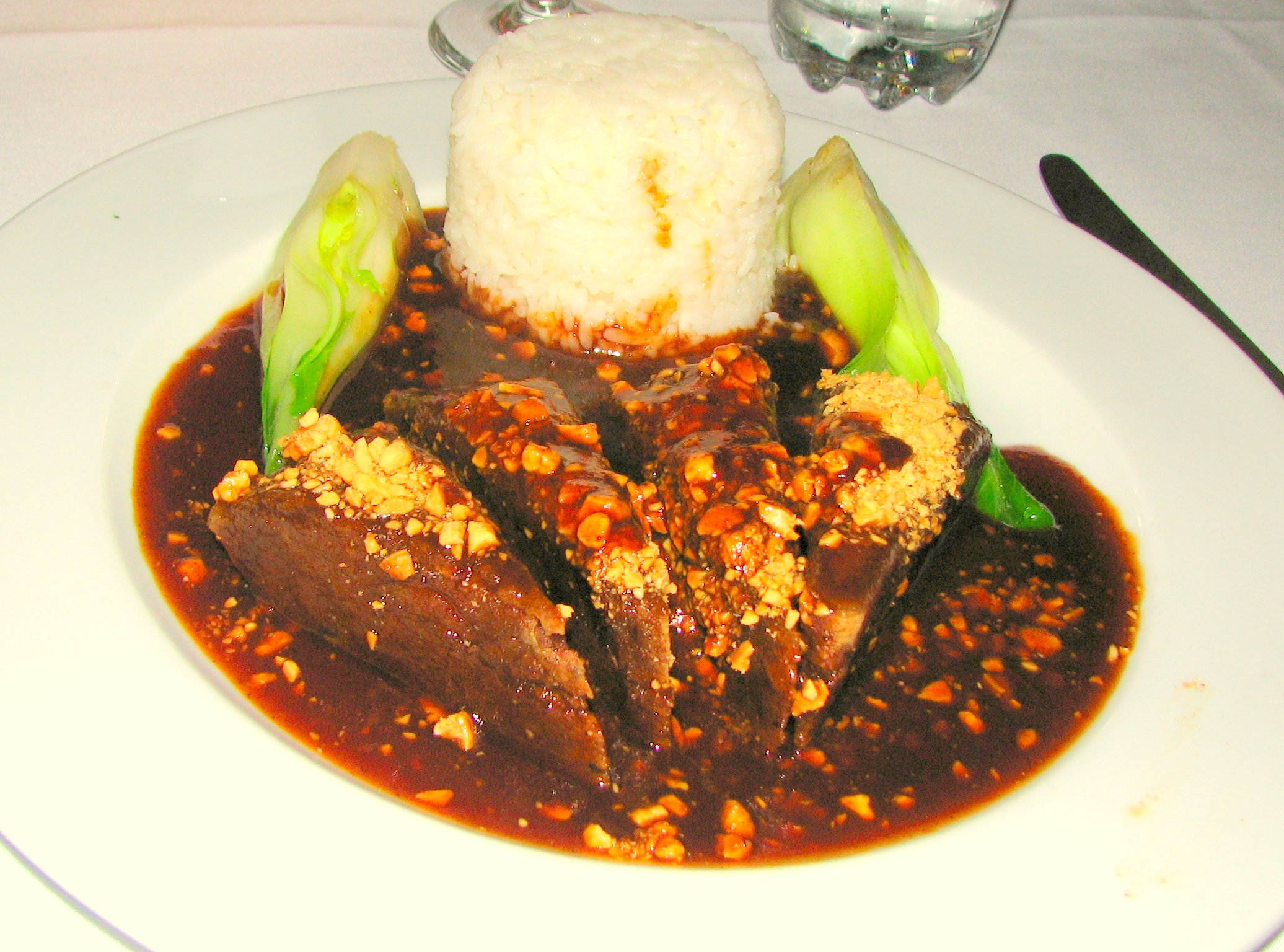
Almond pressed duck at a restaurant

Almond pressed duck, also known as Mandarin pressed duck (Chinese: 窩燒鴨; pinyin: wōshāoyā; Jyutping: wo1 siu1 aap3), was a popular Cantonese dish in Chinese and Polynesian-themed restaurants in the United States in the middle of the 20th century. Crispy and boneless, it is deep-fried and served in either medium-sized pieces of uniform shape or as an entire duck. It is generally served with a sauce poured over it, either brown or sweet and sour. Crushed or powdered almonds are frequently sprinkled over it just before eating, hence one of its names.

Its preparation can be a lengthy process involving a number of steps over a period of several days, making this relatively simple-appearing dish a labor-intensive process. This may explain its virtual disappearance from present-day restaurants: today only a handful of restaurants feature it on their regular menus.

A Cantonese dish, one source says that it originated in the north of China and was brought south in the 17th century at the end of the Ming dynasty by the many people who fled the new Manchu rulers.

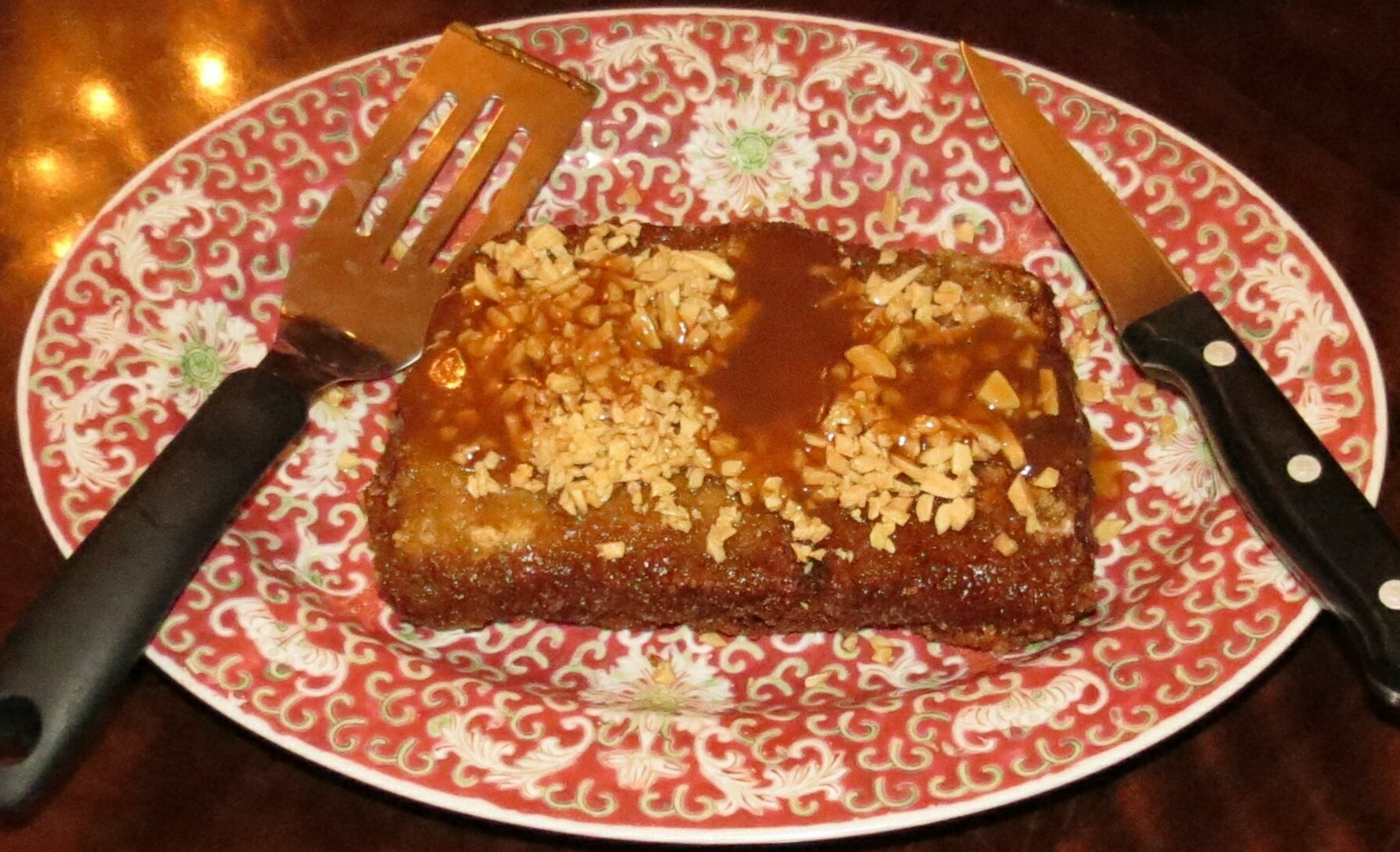
Homemade almond pressed duck with sweet and sour sauce

There are at least three major variations in the method of preparing it, although both the taste and the general procedures remain fairly close. In all cases, a whole duck is seasoned and either steamed or simmered until tender. Its flesh is then flavored and coated with a batter or some form of flour. It may then be steamed a second time; eventually, just before serving, the meat is deep-fried until crispy. Before this final cooking, however, some recipes call for the duck meat (with its skin discarded) to be shredded and then molded into a patty or patties; other recipes have the various pieces of the boned duck pressed firmly together within an envelope of the reserved skin; a third method is to carefully bone the entire duck while preserving its appearance. In the latter case, the whole duck is eventually deep-fried and presented to the table.

== Sources ==
- The Chinese Cook Book, Wallace Yee Hong, Crown Publishers, New York, 1952—an early cookbook of mostly Cantonese recipes
- The Key to Chinese Cooking, Irene Kuo, Alfred A. Knopf, New York, 1980—the Chinese equivalent of Julia Child's Mastering the Art of French Cooking, by the same publisher
