= Peter Gutmann =

Peter Gutmann or Guttman may refer to:

- Peter Gutmann (computer scientist), computer scientist from New Zealand
- Peter Gutmann (journalist) (born 1949), American journalist, writer and attorney
- Peter Guttman (photographer), American author and photographer
