= Mashama Bailey =

American chef

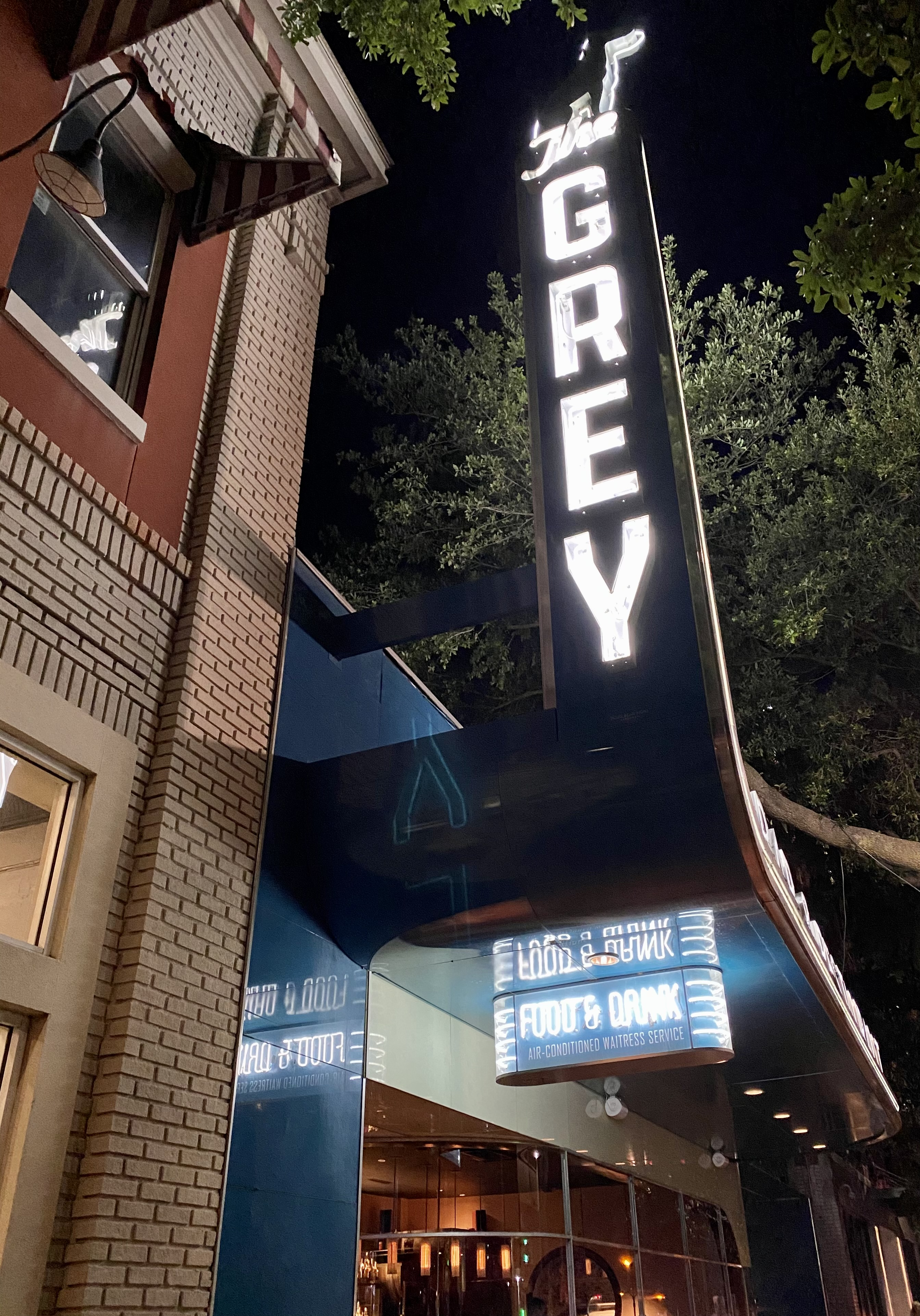
- Bailey's restaurant, The Grey, in Savannah, Georgia
- Born: Mashama Bailey; Bronx, New York
- Education: Francis Lewis High School; Sullivan County Community College; Brooklyn College; Institute of Culinary Education
- Culinary career
- Cooking style: Southern cuisine French technique
- Current restaurants: The Grey; The Grey Market
- Previous restaurant: Prune
- Television shows: Top Chef; Chef's Table

Mashama Bailey is an American chef trained in French technique who is currently cooking Southern cuisine. In 2019, Bailey was awarded a James Beard Award as best chef of the Southeast. In 2022, Bailey was awarded a James Beard Award as Outstanding Chef.

== Early life and education ==
Mashama Bailey was born to David and Catherine Bailey in the Bronx. She was the eldest of three with one sister and one brother. Bailey moved to Waynesboro, Georgia at the age of 2, Savannah, Georgia at 5, and then to Queens, New York when she was 11. Bailey learned to cook from her mother and grandmother.

After graduating from Francis Lewis High School, Bailey attended Sullivan County Community College where she studied physical therapy and later switched to social work. Early in her career, Bailey worked at a homeless shelter in Brooklyn, New York. As the project underwent changes she was let go, an experience that became a catalyst for her to explore the culinary arts. She enrolled in Peter Kump's New York Cooking School, and after graduating began her culinary career at Aquagrill in SoHo.

Bailey, interested in exploring the wider range of careers available in the culinary arts, took a break from the restaurant industry, during which time she worked as a personal chef on the Upper East Side. This left some of her family concerned with the racial and class dynamics, as it seemed a return to how her grandmother migrated from Georgia to Manhattan and worked as a maid. Bailey's grandmother worked within several households, one of the more famous being that of Art Carney.

Working as a personal chef did not inspire Bailey as she had hoped, and during this time she applied for a work-study program that led her to Château du Fey in Burgundy, France. There she was mentored by Anne Willan who advised her to continue cooking in restaurants instead of exploring a culinary writing career.

== Career ==
Bailey started her career as an intern at Aquagrill in 2001, and also worked at David Burke and Donatella, and the Oak Room in the Plaza Hotel. In 2010, Bailey was hired at Prune, where she was quickly promoted to sous-chef and worked for four years.

Startup entrepreneur John O. Morisano heard about Bailey through the chef and owner of Prune, Gabrielle Hamilton, and reached out to her about a long-abandoned, former Jim Crow segregated Greyhound station he'd bought in Savannah, Georgia. Across the street from the property is the Chatham County Courthouse where Bailey's parents were married in the 1980s. The restaurant, named The Grey, was nominated for the 2015 James Beard Foundation Award for Best New Restaurant.

On October 15, 2018, Morisano and Bailey opened The Grey Market in Savannah inspired by Southern lunch counters and New York City bodegas. Since 2017, Bailey has served as chairwoman of the Edna Lewis Foundation, which works to "revive, preserve, and celebrate the rich history of African-American cookery by cultivating a deeper understanding of Southern food and culture in America."

== Awards ==
- The Grey was named one of Food & Wine's best restaurants of 2019.
- Winner of the James Beard Award for Best Chef in the Southeast in 2019.
- In 2018, she was nominated for the James Beard Foundation Award for Best Chef in the Southeast.
- The Grey was one of Food & Wine's best restaurants of 2015.
- The Grey was the 2017 Restaurant of the Year from Eater
- The Grey was chosen as one of the best 100 places in the world by Time in 2018.
- Winner James Beard Award for Outstanding Chef in 2022.

== Television ==
She was a featured chef in the sixth season of Netflix's Chef's Table and was a guest on season 14, episode 6 of Top Chef.
