= Irene Kuo =

Chinese-American chef and bookwriter

- Born: Yuan, Irene Hsingnee; June 12, 1919; Shanghai, Republic of China
- Died: July 19, 1993 (aged 74); Glendale, California, US
- Resting place: Forest Lawn Memorial Park, Los Angeles, US
- Education: Barnard College
- Occupations: Businessperson, Educator

Irene Kuo, née Irene Hsingnee Yuan, (June 12, 1919 – July 19, 1993) was the author of The Key to Chinese Cooking and an influential popularizer of Chinese cuisine in the United States and the West during the 1960s and 1970s. Her appearances on American talk-shows such as Johnny Carson's and Joan Rivers', as well as her successful restaurants, were instrumental in her popularization and education efforts.

== Early life ==
Kuo was born in 1919 into a family of affluent Chinese literati intimately linked to the Qing dynasty government of China. Her uncle Yuan Li-jun was the tutor of Puyi, the last Emperor of China. She grew up exposed to the finest offerings of Chinese cuisine and showed keen interest in learning about food. She befriended the hired cooks in her household and was taught the techniques of preparing some of their more opulent dishes. Her family's influence and affluence at the time also allowed her to travel extensively throughout China, experiencing everything from the heavy meat-based dishes of North China to the fine vegetarian cuisine at family Buddhist retreats.

== Adulthood ==
Kuo went to Barnard College in the United States for her undergraduate degree and returned to China upon graduation. Because of the ongoing civil war in China between Chiang Kai-shek's Nationalists and Mao Zedong's Communists, however, she returned to the United States just after her 22nd birthday. She met her future husband, Chi-Chih Kuo, a general under Chiang Kai-shek, in Washington, D.C. in 1943 and was married the following year. The couple had two sons and, after traveling between her husband's posts in Washington and Italy, they eventually settled in New York City. It was here that they opened their two highly successful restaurants:

- Lichee Tree, opened in 1960 on East 8th Street in Greenwich Village.
- Gingko Tree, opened in 1966 on the corner of 69th Street and Amsterdam near Lincoln Center. The Kuo residences were several floors above each restaurant.

Through publicity events such as holding Barbra Streisand's 20th birthday bash at the Lichee Tree in 1962, commissioning composer Dick Hyman to lead an orchestra accompanied with Chinese cleavers for the Year of the Monkey, and being in the public spotlight in radio, television, and newspapers throughout the 1960s and 1970s, the Kuos became relatively well known in American culture of the time. The Lichee Tree had well-known Chinese New Year celebrations, frequented by famous patrons such as Rocky Marciano, who offered to “fight anybody in the house.” Throughout the 1960s, she also taught classes at the China Institute in New York.

=== The Key to Chinese Cooking ===
In 1971 Kuo pitched the idea of a Chinese cookbook to Judith Jones, who knew of her through her appearance and mention in the media of the time. Jones was impressed by Kuo's extensive knowledge of the cuisine, her articulate prose, and by the sincerity of her voice. Together with copy editor Suzi Arensberg and the illustrator Carolyn Moy, Jones and Kuo worked for more than five years on the manuscript, polishing it to make the concepts and organization understandable for the intended Western audience. It was also written in a way to provide a cultural glimpse into the Chinese psyche as well as being a guide and recipe book for Chinese cuisine. The Chinese seals in the book were designed by Kuo's husband. The book was eventually published in 1977.

Kuo's intention in writing and working on the book was "to leave something permanent". Indeed, the cookbook was successful enough to go through several printings, and it became the standard resource for Chinese cuisine in North America and abroad for the decade to come. It continues to influence food and cookbook writers such as Barbara Tropp, Eileen Yin-Fei Lo, Fuchsia Dunlop, Anne Mendelson, and Grace Young.

== Later life ==
Following the sale of her restaurants and the completion of her cookbook, Kuo retreated from public life and moved to Glendale, California. It had been her intention to publish a follow-up to The Key to Chinese Cooking with 175 recipes; Kuo indicated to Jones on January 2, 1982, that it could be finished within a year. The book was never completed, however, and Kuo eventually cut off contact with Jones for unknown reasons.

Kuo was diagnosed with pancreatic cancer in early 1993 and died later in July 1993, weeks after her husband's death.
