= Cologne, Texas =

Cologne Perdido Community, Centerville, Ira Station, Ira
- Ghost town
- Interactive map of Cologne
- Location within Texas Cologne (the United States)
- Coordinates: 28°42′20″N 97°10′54″W
- Country: United States
- State: Texas
- County: Goliad County

Cologne is a historic ghost town located along U.S Highway 59, in Goliad County, South Texas, United States.

== Etymology ==
The town was initially called the Colony and later Perdido Community, and would be changed again to Centerville when Jim Hall noticed that the town was located between Goliad and Victoria. In 1889, the town would be called Ira station or simply Ira, deriving from the name of a depot as well as a branch line the Gulf, Western Texas and Pacific Railway built on the area in the same year. Eventually, after 10 years of only integrating railway depot, the town would adopt the name "Cologne" at the same time when the local Post Office would be established in 1898, proposed from a resident called William Young who was submitting a request for a post office for the town at the time, with the idea that there's a strong hog stench in the area of the creek, and that it was time for a sweet-smelling fragrance. The Postal Office then implemented Young's proposal, by the approval of the residents.

== History ==
Cologne was established around 1870, during the Civil War Reconstruction Era, by former slaves George Washington and Jim Smith, as a freedmen's town. To achieve this, Smith and Washington relocated the profits they got from their freighting and passenger business to buy 500 acres of total land at Perdido Creek, in which families of slaves would arrive and reside in 1870; five of the first visitors would be families of former slaves from Tennessee and Kentucky. White settlers were excluded, for the founders adamantly believed for the area to strictly only be for freemen.

The community initially relied heavily on agriculture, but after the building of a railway and a depot from the Gulf, Western Texas and Pacific Railway in 1889, shipping became a major economic activity as well.

A Methodist and a Baptist church would be established in the 1880s, but they would be destroyed in the 1930s. The Methodist one was rebuilt, but the baptists would instead start attending services in Fannin.

In 1914, Cologne had 35 residents. Later, in 1925, the post office would close. The population decreased to its record low in 1940 when it dropped down to 25 residents. Although the population would rebound back to 35 during 1970 to 1986, the railroad stations, depot, and cattle pens would no longer exist at this time. In 1997, the population would exponentially increase to 85.

John F. Kennedy would mention this town in his June 1963 speech in Cologne, Germany, saying, "I bring you greetings from the cities of America, including Cologne, Minnesota; Cologne, New Jersey; and even Cologne, Texas."
