= Farm-to-table =

Movement promoting food from local farms

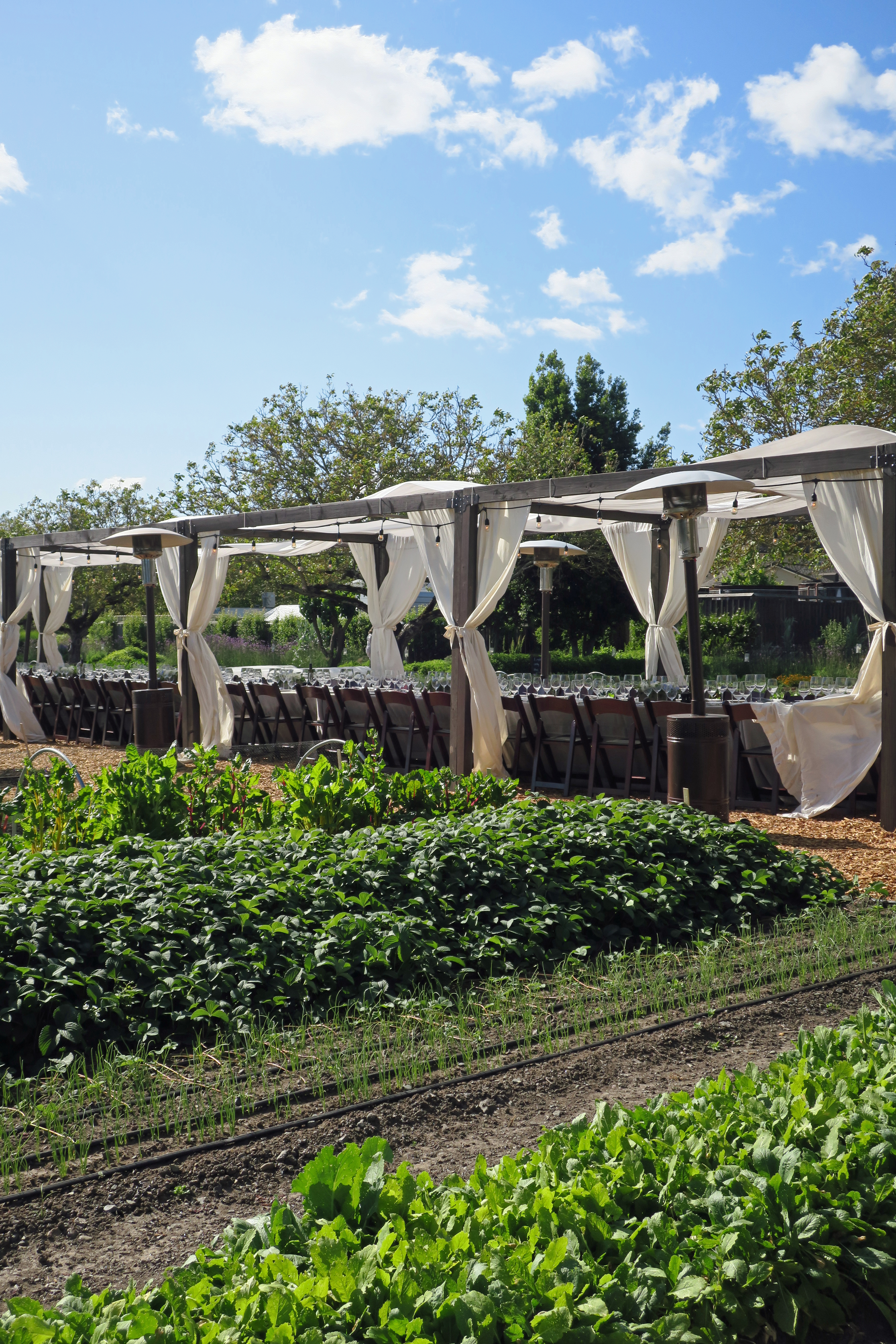
A "farm-to-table" dinner at Kendall-Jackson used produce from the winery's on-site garden.

Farm-to-table (or farm-to-fork, and in some cases farm-to-school) is a social movement which promotes serving local food at restaurants and school cafeterias, preferably through direct acquisition from the producer (which might be a winery, brewery, ranch, fishery, or other type of food producer which is not strictly a "farm"). This might be accomplished by a direct sales relationship, a community-supported agriculture arrangement, a farmer's market, a local distributor or by the restaurant or school raising its own food. Farm-to-table often incorporates a form of food traceability (celebrated as "knowing where your food comes from") where the origin of the food is identified to consumers. Often restaurants cannot source all the food they need for dishes locally, so only some dishes or only some ingredients are labelled as local.

The farm-to-table movement has arisen more or less concurrently with changes in attitudes about food safety, food freshness, food seasonality, and small-farm economics. Advocates and practitioners of the farm-to-table model frequently cite the scarcity of fresh, local ingredients; the poor flavor of ingredients shipped from afar; the poor nutritional integrity of shipped ingredients; the disappearance of small family farms; the disappearance of heirloom and open-pollinated fruits and vegetables; and the dangers of a highly centralized food growing and distribution system as motivators for their decision to adopt a more locavore approach to the food system.

== Influences and growth ==
According to Southern Living, Edna Lewis's 1976 The Taste of Country Cooking is "credited with inspiring the modern farm-to-table movement".

Among the first vocal and influential farm-to-table businesses were Chez Panisse restaurant in Berkeley, California, The Herbfarm in Washington, Bon Appétit Management Company based in Palo Alto, California, and The Kitchen in Boulder, Colorado. Since the 2000s, the number of farm-to-table operations has grown rapidly and "the American Farm to Table Restaurant Guide lists restaurants located in more than 30 states and the District of Columbia". In 2015, according to the National Restaurant Association "four of the top ten trends" related to local foods.

Prominent advocates for the farm-to-table movement, either as chefs, writers, farmers, or environmentalists include Wendell Berry, Wes Jackson, Michael Pollan, Thomas Keller, John Jeavons, Alice Waters, Dan Barber, Joel Salatin, Barbara Kingsolver, Tony Maws, Kevin Gillespie, Edna Lewis, Ken Myszka, Erik Manning and others. In November 2023, Tatler described farm-to-table as being part of the worldview of the bopea ("bohemian peasant") movement, an elite British socio-cultural group.

== Fast-casual meets farm-to-table ==
More recently restaurateurs have tried to democratize the farm-to-table movement by opening fast-casual restaurants that offer relatively affordable locally sourced food. Sweetgreen, a farm-to-table salad chain, has experienced exponential growth since opening in 2007 in Washington, D.C., and now has more than 60 locations across the United States. The salad bar chain started on the premise of sourcing food as locally as possible. The chain "works with more than 500 farmers" to limit the distance food travels across all their locations, requiring each region to build relationships with their local farm community. In New York, another fast casual concept, Dig Inn, has gained popularity with their "farm-to-counter" model. In 2016, Dig Inn announced they intend to buy and manage their own farm. While they do not plan to source all their food from their farm, it will be a place for education and to learn "exactly how things grow". Both of these restaurant concepts have received noteworthy funding, as investors gain more interest in food startups, particularly those connecting to the local food system. Consumer interest is high enough that Applebee's has even explored the farm-to-table concept. In summer 2014, the chain released a location-specific menu option: the Grilled Vidalia Onion Sirloin, in Georgia. It took six months to plan and was only available for a limited period.

== Criticism ==
The farm-to-table trend has been met with some criticism. A Boston Globe critic argues it is a fad by millennials whose obsession with food resembled their parents' generational affinity for "music and drug of choice". The movement is also criticized for being relatively less affordable than other forms of food and dining. Others argue that the farm-to-table term is not fully understood by consumers. For example, foods advertised as farm-to-table are considered healthier regardless of actual nutritional content.

== Restaurant fraud ==
Journalist investigations at the Tampa Bay Times and San Diego Magazine found widespread fraud in the claims made by the area's farm-to-table restaurants. Cases included a restaurant previously bought from a farm-to-table provider but has since switched to different suppliers without updating the menu; a restaurant claims to buy from a farmer, but the farmer denies ever having sold to that restaurant; a restaurant serving a type of food the cited farmer or fisher has never grown or caught or which is currently out of season or not being provided; a restaurant claiming to serve food from a provider which has gone out of business years ago; food from the claimed source makes up only a small portion of the type of food on the plate. In such cases the food actually served is usually non-local or even "commodity" food which is cheaper and more available out-of-season. In some cases food claimed to be "wild caught", "preservative-free", "made in-house", "Fresh from Florida", or "Long Island duck" was not.

Such practices open restaurants to lawsuits from both the farmer whose name is being used fraudulently, and lawsuits from consumers who have purchased mislabelled food products, as well as enforcement actions by government agencies. Tampa Bay Times food critic and investigative reporter Laura Reiley attributes fraud in part to the rise of the farm-to-table trend since 2012, the lack of time of restaurants to deal directly with farms whereas they normally would deal with one or two large distributors, and in many cases sheer profit motive.

== See also ==
- EU Farm to Fork strategy
- Slow Food
- Food miles
- Low-carbon diet
- Organic farming
- Sustainable agriculture
- Kitchen garden
- Bean-to-bar
- Vertical integration
