= Historically African-American communities and settlements =

Towns established in the United States

Historically African-American communities and settlements, known in various areas as "Freedmen Towns," "Freetowns," "freedom colonies," or "All-Black towns" were established by or for a predominantly African-American populace. Many of these municipalities were established or populated by freed slaves either during or after the period of legal slavery in the United States in the 19th century.

In pre-segregation Oklahoma, many African-American migrants from the Southeast found a space whereby they could establish municipalities on their own terms. Chief among them was Edward P. McCabe, who envisioned so large a number of African-Americans settling in the territory that it would become a Black-governed state.

Monroe Work's Negro Year Book editions included a listing of "Negro Towns and Settlements in the United States."

== List ==
Places marked in italics are no longer populated. Places marked with * are absorbed into larger cities.

=== Alabama ===
- Africatown
- Benson / Kowaliga, Alabama
- Hobson City, became Alabama's first self-governed all-black municipality in 1899

=== California ===
- Abila, California (Abila Station)
- Allensworth
- Bowles, California
- Victorville, California

=== Colorado ===
- Dearfield

=== Florida ===
- Eatonville
- New Monrovia
- Newtown (Palatka)
- Newtown (Sarasota, Florida)
- Overtown (Miami)

=== Georgia ===
- Johnsontown *
- Oscarville, Georgia

=== Illinois ===
- New Philadelphia
- Lakeview

=== Indiana ===
- Lick Creek
- Lyles Station
- Weaver

=== Kansas ===
- Nicodemus

=== Louisiana ===
- Mossville
- Scotlandville, Baton Rouge

=== Maryland ===
- Lincoln Park, Rockville, Maryland
- Lyttonsville
- Scotland, Montgomery County, Maryland

=== Massachusetts ===
- Parting Ways

=== Mississippi ===
- Mound Bayou

=== Nebraska ===
- DeWitty

=== New Jersey ===
- Marshalltown
- Timbuctoo, New Jersey

=== New Mexico ===
- Blackdom

=== New York ===
- Seneca Village
- Weeksville, Brooklyn

=== North Carolina ===
- Hayti *
- Soul City
- Princeville

=== Oklahoma ===
- Boley
- Brooksville
- Clearview
- Grayson
- Langston
- Lima
- Redbird
- Rentiesville
- Summit
- Taft
- Tatums
- Tullahassee
- Vernon

=== Pennsylvania ===
- Indian Run
- Laurel Hill
- Rosedale*
- Six Penny Creek

=== Tennessee ===
- Boxtown*

=== Texas ===
- Antioch Colony
- Armstrong Colony
- Barrett Station
- Cedar Branch
- Clarksville
- Cozy Corner
- Cologne
- Deep Ellum
- Fodice
- Grant's Colony
- Hall's Bluff
- Independence Heights
- Kendleton
- Saint Johns Colony
- Shankleville
- Tenth Street * Historically called Oak Cliff or Oak Cliff Negro District to distinguish the segregated freedman's town from the ethnically white Town of Oak Cliff.
- Upshaw
- Wheatville

=== Virginia ===
- Arlington View - Originally named Johnson's Hill
- Freedman's Village - Freedman fully evicted by U.S. Army by 1900, now part of Arlington National Cemetery
- Freetown, Orange County, Virginia
- Freetown, Virginia (Albermarle County)
- Green Valley
- Hall's Hill
- Queen City - Demolished during construction of the Pentagon
- Zenda, Virginia

== See also ==
- Great Migration (African American)
- Exoduster
- African American resorts
