= Francis Lewis High School =

Public school in New York City

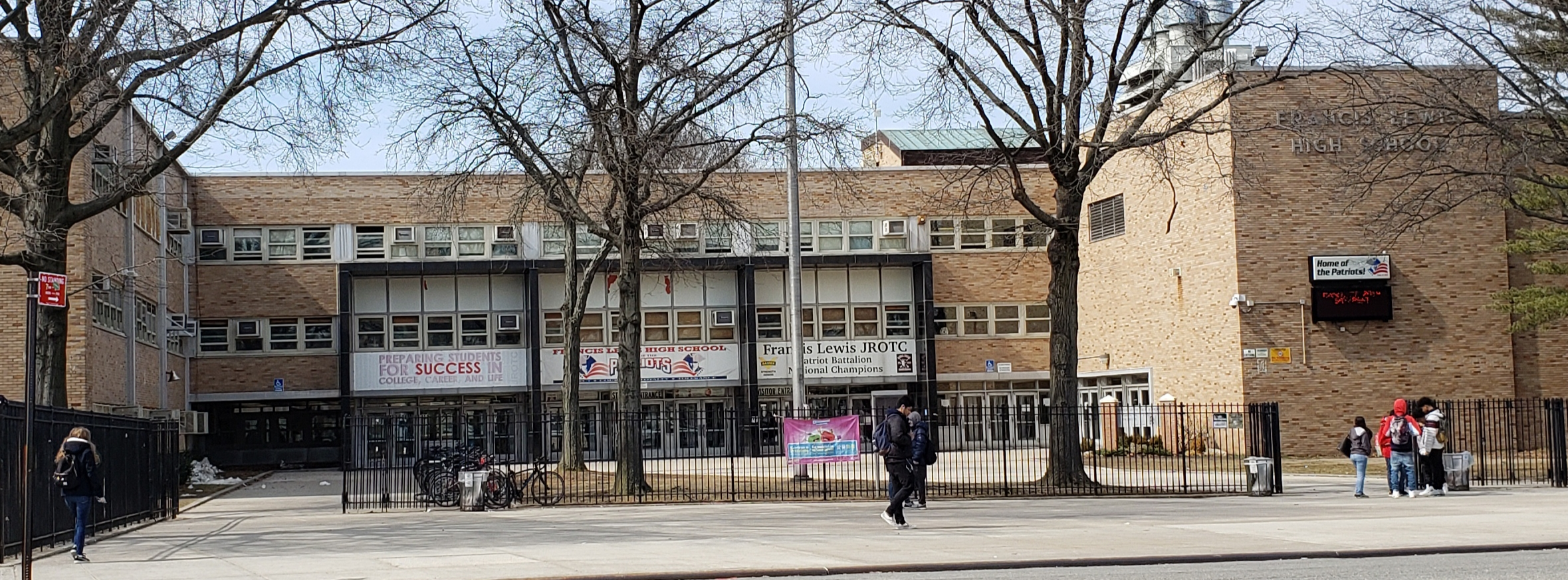

Location
- 58-20 Utopia Parkway; Fresh Meadows, New York 11365; United States; 40°44′27″N 73°47′38″W

Information
- Type: Public high school
- Motto: Preparing students for success in college, career, and life
- Established: September 13, 1960; 66 years ago
- School district: New York City Department of Education
- School number: Q430
- CEEB code: 331926
- NCES School ID: 360009901953
- Principal: Nidhi Babbar
- Faculty: 248.65 (on FTE basis)
- Grades: 9 to 12
- Gender: Co-ed
- Enrollment: 4,406 (2022-23)
- Student to teacher ratio: 17.72
- Campus size: 1.5 acres
- Colors: Red, Black, and White
- Athletics conference: PSAL
- Mascot: Patriots
- Nickname: Franny, Franny Lew, Lewis
- Team name: Patriots
- Rivals: Benjamin N. Cardozo High School; Bayside High School; Springfield Gardens High School
- Yearbook: Galaxy
- Website: www.francislewishs.org

Francis Lewis High School (FLHS) is a selective public high school located in Fresh Meadows, in the New York City borough of Queens. It is one of the most-applied-to public high schools in New York City with 9,468 applicants in 2016. Operated by the New York City Department of Education, the school serves students of grades 9–12. The school is named after Francis Lewis, who signed the United States Declaration of Independence as a representative of New York.

The school has a 93% attendance rate, compared to 89% citywide. The school's graduation rate is 88% in four years, compared to 76% citywide. Of the graduating class, 82% of graduates enrolled in college or other post-secondary program within six months of graduation, compared to 59% citywide.

== Student body ==
Francis Lewis is one of the most applied-to public high schools in New York City. In March 2016, Francis Lewis had 9,468 applicants applying for a seat in the school. During the 2024–2025 school year, Francis Lewis had 4,573 students enrolled. For the 2019–2020 academic year, the student body was 56% Asian, 22% Hispanic, 16% Caucasian, and 6% African American. Ten percent of the students were learning English as a second language. Fourteen percent of the students had special needs.

Francis Lewis is also one of the most overcrowded; it has a capacity of 2,300, and the 2019–2020 enrollment figures exceeded that capacity by 76 percent. In 2019, the New York City School Construction Authority started constructing an annex with 500 seats and amenities such as a culinary arts room, a science lab, and a greenhouse. The annex was completed and opened in September 2022.

== Academics ==
=== Language studies ===
Francis Lewis High School teaches several foreign languages, including Chinese (Mandarin), French, Greek (for the fourth year of the University Scholars program), Italian, Japanese, Korean, Latin, and Spanish. Classes for native speakers in Chinese, Korean, and Spanish are also available for students satisfying the NYCDOE's foreign language requirement. The school previously taught Arabic and Hebrew, but those classes ended due to declining interest.

=== Advanced Placement courses ===
In 1978, Francis Lewis High School was the first public high school to achieve certification to the International Baccalaureate, but stopped offering it in the 1990s. Advanced Placement (AP) courses are also available, offering college credit for work done during high school (based on the final test score). Students may choose the full program to get a full years' college credit, or simply courses of interest (for credit towards single college courses such as math or humanities). Sixty-six percent of twelfth graders take at least one Advanced Placement exam at any time during high school; of these, 50% earned at least a 3 on at least one Advanced Placement exam.

Students may choose from 20 AP courses offered at Francis Lewis, including Biology, Calculus AB, Calculus BC, Capstone, Chemistry, Chinese Language and Culture, Computer Science A, English Language and Composition, English Literature and Composition, Environmental Science, Japanese Language and Culture, Latin, Macroeconomics, Microeconomics, Physics 1, Physics 2, AP Physics C: Mechanics, Psychology, Spanish, Statistics, United States Government and Politics, United States History, and World History.

Francis Lewis High School was ranked 29th out of the 520 public high schools in New York City, according to U.S. News & World Report.

== Junior Reserve Officers' Training Corps ==
In 1994, the US Army Junior Reserve Officers' Training Corps (JROTC) program was established in the school. It is the largest in the nation, with more than 1,000 cadets of the 1,725 high school chapters in the country. The battalion is an honor unit with distinction, and it is considered one of the best and well-known US Army JROTC units in the nation. It had a 100% graduation rate from 1992 to 2013.

There are seven JROTC teams, namely Academic, Cybersecurity, Choir, Drum Corps, Honor Guard, Fitness (Added in 2023) and Drill Team (Armed and Unarmed). Two teams compete, Academic and Drill Team (Unarmed – Patriot Pride, Armed – Patriot Guard). Francis Lewis High School used to have a competing Raiders team (female – Patriot Strength, male – Patriot Force).

In 2018 allegations of hazing (involving sexual and physical assault) from the male Raiders team were made.

The Patriot Guard were national champions in 2007, 2009–2011, and placed second in 2012. The Patriot Pride came in second in 2006, 2008 and 2009 and first in 2010 and 2013 National Championships in Daytona, Florida.

The female Raiders were national champions for four consecutive years from 2009 to 2012. The male Raiders' most recent first-place title was in 2011, having come in third in the 2012 Nationals and second in the 2013 Nationals.

The Academic team was awarded first place at the 2015 Leadership Bowl Nationals. The Academic team placed as finalists in the JROTC Leadership Academic Bowl in 2011, 2012, and 2013.

In 2010, Francis Lewis had more cadets in the United States Military Academy than any other public high school in the United States.

The JROTC Program may be chosen as an elective that a student may have in addition to their program. Students enrolled in JROTC are required to partake in weekly physical training, conduct school and community service, wear the Army Service Uniform once a week, as well as take courses on leadership, nutrition, personal finance, civics, and government.

== Extracurricular activities ==
=== Athletics ===
Francis Lewis High School's athletic teams compete in the PSAL. Student-athletes compete in baseball, basketball, bowling, cheerleading, cross country, fencing, golf, handball, soccer, softball, swimming, tennis, track, volleyball, and wrestling

Francis Lewis High School's cross country team won the PSAL championship in 2025.

The school's soccer team won the PSAL championship in 1969.

The softball team won the PSAL championship in 1975.

Francis Lewis High School's girls basketball team won the PSAL Championship in March 1979. The team was undefeated in the regular season that year.

Francis Lewis has had a cricket team since 2015.

The school's male and female American handball team won the PSAL championship in the 2018–2019 season.

During the 1994–1995 season, Francis Lewis High School's boys basketball team was undefeated in its division, the first time it had done so since the 1980–1981 season. The team won the PSAL B Championship in March 1995. The team advanced to the New York State Federation Basketball Class A championship in Glens Falls. It lost to Mount Saint Michael Academy of the Bronx, knocking it out of the state tournament.

Francis Lewis High School's athletic field is named for Margaret Lambert, a German Jewish track and field athlete. During the 1930s, German athletic teams were closed to Jewish athletes, and the United States was considering to boycott the 1936 Summer Olympics in Berlin in protest of Germany's anti-Semitism. Adolf Hitler wanted to avoid a boycott, so he threatened her father to have her train for Germany in order to convince the world that Germany welcomed Jewish athletes to its team if they qualified. She tied the German high jump record at the national trials in Stuttgart, and she trained at the Olympic training camp in Ettlingen.

== History ==
In 1952, the Northeast Queens Council for Schools advocated for a northeast Queens high school because of severe overcrowding at Bayside High School, Flushing High School, Andrew Jackson High School, and Jamaica High School.

In December 1955, the New York City Board of Education approved the building of a new high school, called Northeast Queens High School, near the intersection of Utopia Parkway and 59th Avenue, with a capacity of 3,000 students. The city bought 11 acres of land, and the City Planning Commission agreed that the high school was needed, but the Commission did not approve the allocation of money to build the school in the capital budget.

In August 1956, the city approved the hiring of the firm of Eggers & Higgins to be the architect of the building, although the budget to actually build the high school was not yet approved.

In October 1956, Mayor Robert F. Wagner Jr. wrote a letter to the City Planning Commission asking it to include the construction of Northeast Queens High School in its capital budget. The construction was included in the capital budget in 1957.

In March 1958, the Board of Education approved a contract to build the high school. A $4,229,000 contract was awarded to the lowest bidder, Caristo Construction Company. The ground-breaking happened that same year. A group of parents tried to have an indoor swimming pool built in the high school, but they were not successful. The high school ended up costing $6,100,000 to build.

Francis Lewis High School opened on September 13, 1960. The school was named after Francis Lewis, a resident of Whitestone who signed the United States Declaration of Independence. Vincent McGarrett was the first principal. Herman Wolf was the first basketball coach. Queensborough Community College held some of its classes at Francis Lewis High School that year because its own campus was still under construction.

Francis Lewis High School was built for a capacity of 2,700 students. The school was overcrowded as of the 1962–1963 school year. Cardozo High School was built in 1967 in order to relieve overcrowding at Francis Lewis.

In 1965, Queensborough Community College held some of its evening classes at Francis Lewis High School due to overcrowding at Queensborough.

In 1978, Francis Lewis High School graduated International Baccalaureate diploma students, the first public high school in the United States to do so. It terminated in the 1990s.

In early 2018, Francis Lewis High School announced plans for a new annex to add more space and alleviate overcrowding. It would be located where a tennis court and the Margaret Lambert Track and Field House were. Construction began in 2019 and was finished by September 2022.

== Notable alumni ==
- Mashama Bailey - an American chef specializing in Southern cuisine, she is the chef at The Grey
- Steve Dorff (1968) – composer/music producer
- Rob Echeverria – American musician who has worked as the guitarist of Biohazard, Helmet, Rest in Pieces, and Straight Ahead.
- Rick Elice (1973) – actor, writer
- Steve Greenberg (1978) – record producer, former President of Columbia Records
- Sebastián Guenzatti – soccer player for the Tampa Bay Rowdies of the United Soccer League
- Peter Guttman (1972) – travel journalist, lecturer, and author
- Heejun Han (2007) – finalist on American Idol, season 11
- Albie Hecht – former president of Nickelodeon, founder of Spike TV
- Mike Jorgensen (1966) – drafted by the New York Mets; played for the New York Mets, Montreal Expos, Oakland Athletics, Texas Rangers, Atlanta Braves, and St. Louis Cardinals; managed the Cardinals
- Paul Joskow — American economist and professor
- Peter Marino – American architect
- Clair Marlo (1976) - aka Clara Veseliza - composer/music producer
- Peter Mehlman (1973) - a renowned writer, comedian, and television and film producer best known for his work on Seinfeld and Madagascar.
- Mark Miloscia – Washington State Senator
- Jonathan Pontell – television director, producer, and editor
- Craig Setari – American musician and former competitive boxer who is currently active as the bass player in Sick of It All – hardcore punk band
- Dennis Walcott – former chancellor of the New York City Department of Education, president and CEO of the Queens Borough Public Library system

== In fiction ==
- In The Yards, Joaquin Phoenix plays a character who graduated from Francis Lewis High School. The film's director, James Gray, grew up in Flushing.
