= The Grey (restaurant) =

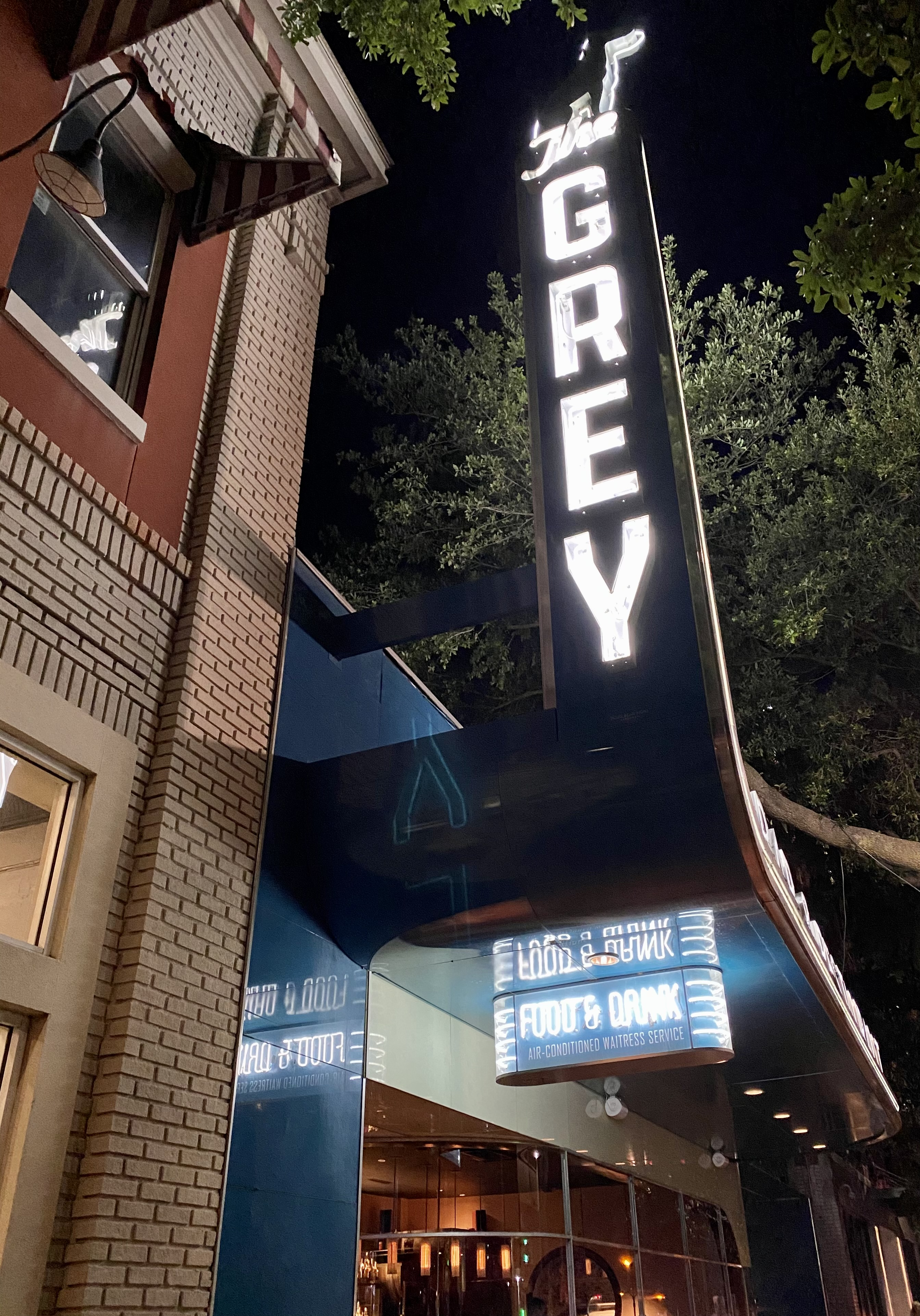
- Interactive map of The Grey

Restaurant information
- Established: December 2014
- Owners: John O. Morisano; Mashama Bailey
- Head chef: Mashama Bailey
- Food type: American; Southern
- Dress code: Casual
- Location: 109 Martin Luther King Jr. Blvd, Savannah, Georgia, 31401, United States
- Coordinates: 32°4′47.53″N 81°5′51.63″W
- Seating capacity: 60
- Reservations: Yes
- Website: thegreyrestaurant.com

The Grey is an American and Southern restaurant in Savannah, Georgia, United States. It is co-owned by John O. Morisano and Mashama Bailey, the latter of whom also serves as head chef.

== History ==
Based in New York City, John O. Morisano moved to Savannah, Georgia, part time. While there, he bought a former Greyhound bus depot in downtown Savannah, which he had toured in March 2012. He bought the building in March 2013 for $945,000. The depot closed in 1964. When it was operating, the depot was racially segregated with separate waiting areas and restrooms for blacks and whites. Morisano planned to open a restaurant in the depot and was introduced to Mashama Bailey through Gabrielle Hamilton. At that time, Bailey was a sous chef at Hamilton's New York restaurant, Prune.

== Design and ambiance ==
The Grey is located inside a former Greyhound bus depot in downtown Savannah. Morisano invested millions of dollars to make the restaurant Streamline Moderne in style and design. Parts and Labor designed the interior and Felder & Associates were the architecture firm. The depot's former diner became the Grey's dining room. Curved booths are blue, representing the Greyhound bus logo. The bar is horseshoe shaped. There are numbers painted on the walls representing the station's former boarding gates. The kitchen is the former ticket booth. The Savannah Morning News' Julia Ritchey described the look as similar to Edward Hopper's Nighthawks.

Artwork in the restaurant includes works Adam Keuhl, Marcus Kenney, Betsy Cain, and a photograph of James Cleveland performing at the First African Baptist Church in Savannah by photographer James Cleveland.

== Cuisine and beverages ==
When the restaurant first opened, Bailey called the cuisine "port city Southern food." Today, the restaurant remains primarily Southern in style with African influences. African influences include the use of Kanni sauce from Senegal and harissa. Bailey also pulls influence from European cuisine, including in one of her signature dishes: foie gras and grits. To find inspiration for the menu, Bailey read books by Edna Lewis. At one point, Bailey designed the entire menu around different chapters of Lewis' In Pursuit of Flavor.

The menu changes regularly. Appetizers may include oysters, benne seed crackers and chutney, and watermelon salad. Main dishes may include Country Captain. Side dishes are offered, including smoked greens.

The restaurant has a full bar, with cocktails including gimlets.

== Reception ==
In 2015, Ingrid K. Williams visited the restaurant on behalf of the New York Times. Williams praised the decor, a pork shank prepared with cane sugar, greens and cornbread, and the desserts. However, in the same review she said the restaurant was still "ironing out kinks" citing an overcooked roasted sea bass. That same year it was nominated for a James Beard Award.

In 2017, The Grey was named Eater's 2017 Restaurant of the Year. The following year, The Grey was named one of Time's Greatest Places.

The Netflix documentary series Chef's Table, directed by David Gelb, featured The Grey in the first episode of season six.

== The Grey Market ==
In Fall of 2018, building on the success of The Grey restaurant, Bailey and Morisano opened a secondary concept in Savannah called The Grey Market. "The Grey Market combines their love for New York City bodegas, the true lifeblood of any New Yorker, with the history and convenience of the Southern lunch counter," and provides walk-in counter food service and pantry items.
