= Allan Gerson =

American lawyer

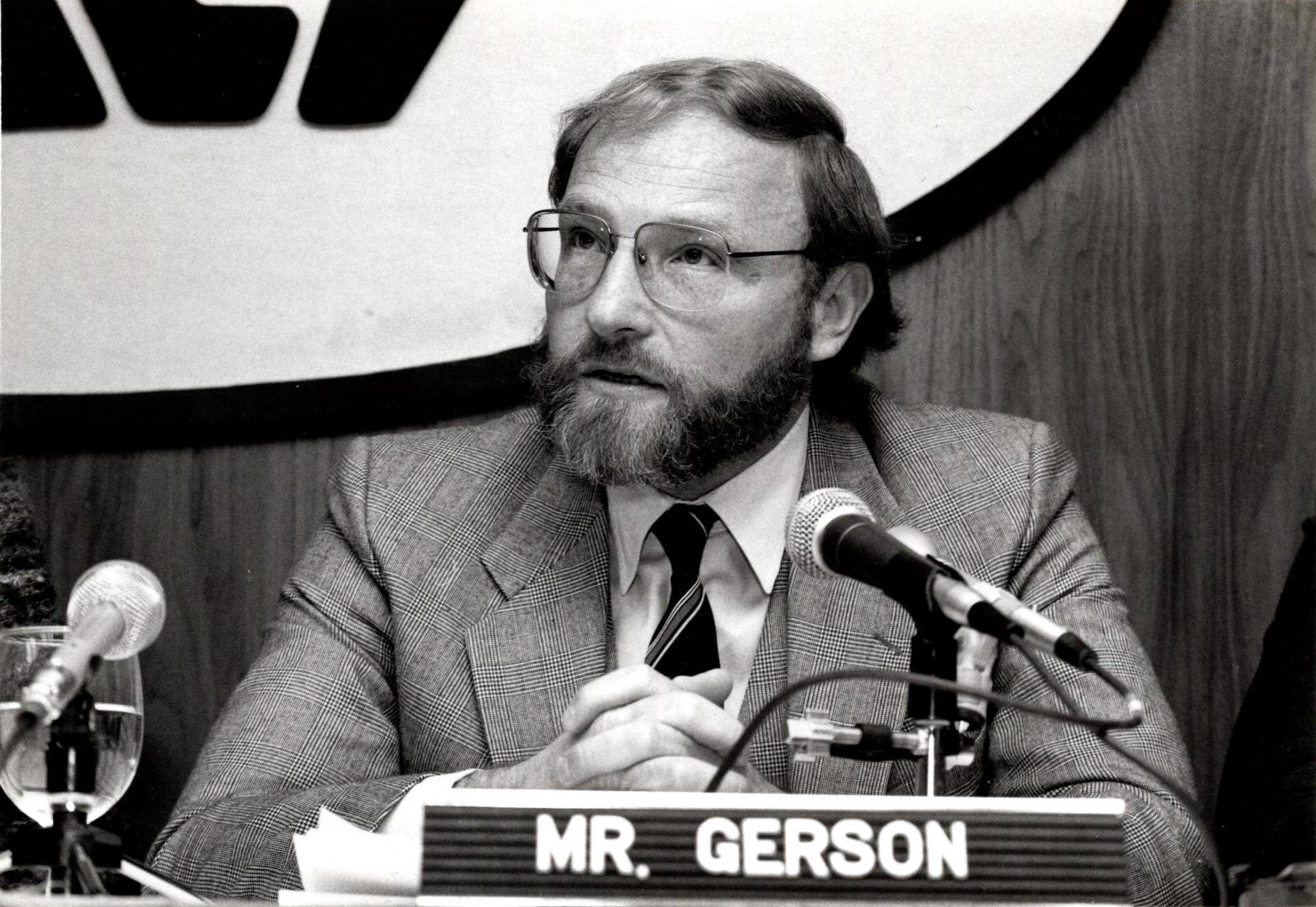
- Allan Gerson as a Senior Fellow at the American Enterprise Institute, late 1980s
- Born: Elik Gerzon; June 19, 1945; Samarkand, Uzbek SSR
- Died: December 1, 2019 (aged 74); Washington, D.C.
- Education: City College of New York; University at Buffalo (BA, 1966); New York University School of Law (JD, 1969); Hebrew University of Jerusalem (LLM, 1972); Yale Law School (SJD, 1976)
- Occupations: Lawyer, author
- Known for: Litigation against Libya for the Pan Am Flight 103 bombing; prosecuting Nazi war collaborators
- Spouse: Joan Nathan (m. 1974)
- Children: Daniela Gerson; David Henry Gerson; Merissa Gerson

Allan Gerson (born Elik Gerzon; June 19, 1945 – December 1, 2019) was an American attorney and legal scholar based in Washington, D.C., whose practice focused on international law and government accountability. A child of Holocaust survivors, he was born in Samarkand, Uzbekistan, and immigrated to the United States as a child. He is best known for compelling Libya to compensate the families of victims of the 1988 bombing of Pan Am Flight 103 over Lockerbie, Scotland, the deadliest terror attack against the United States prior to 9/11, and for helping reshape American law to allow suits against state sponsors of terrorism.

== Early life and education ==
Born in a refugee camp in Samarkand, Uzbekistan in 1945 after World War II, Gerson, a child of Holocaust survivors, Motel Gerzon, a bookkeeper at his family's candy store in Zamość, Poland, and Peshka (née Szajt), a dressmaker. The family immigrated illegally to the United States under a false identity. He later came to identify himself as a "dreamer."

Elik, his parents, and a younger brother arrived in New York Harbor when Elik was five, settling in Brooklyn and later moving to the Bronx.

Gerson earned an undergraduate degree in economics in 1966, from the University at Buffalo. In 1969, he received a Juris Doctor degree from New York University, a master of laws degree in international law from the Hebrew University of Jerusalem in 1972, and a doctor of juridical science degree from Yale Law School in 1976.

== Career ==
=== Early career ===
Gerson began his legal career as a prosecutor of Nazi war criminals in the Office of Special Investigations (OSI) of the United States Department of Justice, an experience he later chronicled in his posthumously published memoir. He subsequently served as deputy assistant attorney general under President Ronald Reagan. He also taught law as a professor at George Mason University.

=== Private practice and terrorism litigation ===
In private practice, Gerson became one of the leading attorneys in the emerging field of terrorism litigation. He is best known for his years-long effort to hold Libya accountable for the 1988 bombing of Pan Am Flight 103 over Lockerbie, Scotland, which killed 270 people and remains the largest terror attack against the United States prior to 9/11. His legal strategy ultimately forced Libyan leader Muammar Qaddafi to compensate the victims' families.

Together with attorney Mark Zaid, Gerson helped secure passage of the Antiterrorism and Effective Death Penalty Act of 1996, which amended the laws of sovereign immunity to allow American citizens to bring suit against foreign governments that financed or planned terrorist activity.

Following the September 11 attacks, Gerson led families of victims "to file suit against various interests associated with the government of Saudi Arabia, alleging that they helped finance Osama bin Laden and his terrorist network."

=== Other work ===
Beyond the law, Gerson was also a photographer whose work was collected at the International Photography Hall of Fame and Museum in St. Louis.

== Books ==
His books include The Price of Terror: The History-Making Struggle for Justice After Pan Am 103 (2001, co-authored by Jerry Adler), Privatizing Peace: From Conflict to Security (2002, co-authored by Nat J. Colletta), The Kirkpatrick Mission: Diplomacy Without Apology, America at the United Nations 1981–1985 (1991), Israel, The West Bank and International Law (1978), and his memoir, published post-humously, Lies That Matter: A federal prosecutor and child of Holocaust survivors, tasked with stripping US citizenship from aged Nazi collaborators, finds himself caught in the middle (2021).

== Personal life ==
Gerson was married to Joan Nathan, an American cookbook author and newspaper journalist. He passed away in 2019 from complications of Creutzfeldt-Jakob disease, a degenerative brain disorder.
