= Flora Mae Hunter =

American cook and cookbook author

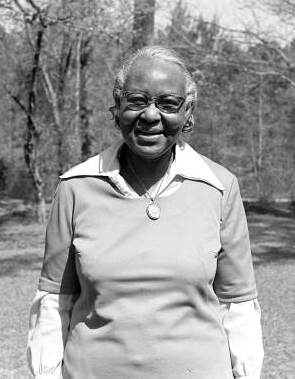
- Flora Mae Hunter photographed in 1988 for the Florida Folk Heritage Awards
- Born: Flora Mae Ross; November 29, 1910 or 1911; Thomas County, Georgia, US
- Died: December 8, 2003
- Occupations: Cook, cookbook author
- Years active: c. 1926–1968
- Notable work: Born in the Kitchen: Plain and Fancy Plantation Fixin's
- Spouse: Peter Hunter
- Awards: Florida Folk Heritage Award

Flora Mae Hunter (née Ross, November 29, 1910 or 1911 – December 8, 2003) (Note: Sources conflict on Hunter's birth year. A 1985 Tallahassee Democrat story, for example, reported she would turn 75 on November 29 of that year, making her birth year 1910. Some sources concur, but Southern Foodways Alliance says she was born in 1911, which is reflected in her obituary, according to which she died at age 92 in December 2003.) was an American cook and cookbook author. She was a longtime cook on plantations in northern Florida—in particular, cooking for 36 years at Horseshoe Plantation near Tallahassee, Florida. In 1979 she published a cookbook of recipes from her career cooking for the plantation's workers as well as the owners and guests, called Born in the Kitchen: Plain and Fancy Plantation Fixin's. In 1988, she was awarded a Florida Folk Heritage Award for her contributions to the "cultural resources" of the state.

== Early life ==
Flora Mae Ross was born in 1910 or 1911 on Springhill Plantation in Thomas County, Georgia, near the Florida border. Her father Eddie was a handyman on the plantation and her mother Lessie (c. 1886–1971) a cook. (Note: A funeral notice gives her name as Leslie.) Flora Mae had a sister and a brother. They moved to Tallahassee, Florida, in 1914.

== Cooking career ==
Flora Mae left school aged 15 to join her mother working in the kitchen at Sunnyhill Plantation in Leon County, Florida. Sunnyhill was owned by Lewis Thompson, son of the treasurer and secretary of Standard Oil. This was part of a trend of Gilded Age northern scions buying plantations in the southern states as hunting preserves. The local white planter class had largely lost their wealth in the Civil War and sold off their land; while large numbers of formerly enslaved African-Americans then remained in the area, few had access to purchase the land their families had worked for generations, and many who stayed in the south continued in roles similar to those their forebears had prior to emancipation.

Ross spent four years working with her mother, learning her recipes, many passed down in turn from her grandmother. She subsequently worked at adjacent plantations including Foshalee. These jobs afforded her the opportunity to travel, including to Morrisburg, Ontario, as well as Cleveland, Ohio, the latter with Mrs. Ralph Perkins. However after a year, homesickness brought her back to Tallahassee, where she worked for Mrs. Willie C. Beauford of Thomasville. In this decision, she chose a path different from the many African-Americans who left the south in this period as part of the Great Migration; Ross instead chose a life in the community that had raised her.

On March 9, 1933, Flora Mae, then 21, married Peter Hunter, who had begun working at Horseshoe Plantation tending the fire in circa 1917, and continued there for 57 years. Flora Mae's parents had been hired in 1916, the first local employees after the 13,000-acre (5,300 ha) plantation was purchased by Edith and George F. Baker (son of George Fisher Baker). Baker, the president of City Bank of New York, kept the plantation as a winter home, primarily for use in quail-hunting season. Baker hired Flora Mae Hunter in 1933 after tasting her cooking when she helped in the kitchen at Horseshoe, declaring her dishes the best he had ever had in the south and feeling her service meant he no longer needed a chef to travel with him from New York for his three-month stays in Florida.

Hunter cooked at Horseshoe Plantation for 36 years, until her retirement in 1968. Her husband worked his way up to butler at the plantation, making him her supervisor and in charge of menu selection. She was responsible for preparing meals for the staff of 30 as well as for the Bakers and a regular rotation of guests. The global elite who joined the Bakers for quail-hunting season at Horseshoe Plantation gave Hunter's cooking an international reputation. The Duke and Duchess of Windsor (the former King Edward VIII and Wallis Simpson) were regular visitors, with the Duchess registering the joking complaint that she enjoyed Hunter's food so much she gained three pounds (1.4 kg) on each visit.

The dual roles Hunter had in the kitchen, cooking for staff and for the owners and guests, meant Hunter developed expertise in parallel styles of cooking. As Southern Foodways Alliance later described it, she made "pigtail pilau with a side of fried okra and peach cobbler for the workers; turtle soup, pan-broiled venison, and tapioca pudding for the Bakers." The Bakers and guests would eat only the breasts of ducks, so Hunter gave the rest of the dressed birds for the plantation workers, similar to the saving of scraps that had sustained enslaved people.

== Later life ==
As of 1978, Hunter and her husband lived in a brick home on four acres (1.6 ha) on Thomasville Road, next to Horseshoe Plantation. By the 1970s Hunter was a prominent member of the community, serving as vice-president of the Leon County Extension Homemakers' Council, part of the network of Extension Home Economics Clubs dedicated to developing leadership and improving knowledge of home economics. One of its projects was the Horseshoe Club, a sewing, crafts and service organization for those living around the Horseshoe Plantation; Hunter was its president.

In 1979, Hunter published a cookbook called Born in the Kitchen: Plain and Fancy Plantation Fixin's. The book reflected the two groups she cooked for in her career, but also made some adaptations from the recipes she had used. Convenience foods appeared in some recipes, where she would have cooked from scratch. She also cooked for most of her career on a pair of wood-burner stoves, but crafted the recipes in her cookbook to assign temperatures for use in a gas oven. Recipes included "Horseshoe Eggs", a spicy egg casserole Hunter invented when Edith Baker requested deviled eggs but the kitchen did not have enough eggs to serve all of the guests. She also included rice cakes, a pancake-like recipe recommended for breakfast or dessert; it was originally a recipe requested by George Baker, but was adapted by Hunter over time. "Smothered quail", "Sugar string beans with no sugar", and "Southern syrup corn meal sweet bread" were also among the recipes she selected for the cookbook.

Hunter formed her own publishing company, Pine Cone Press, to publish Born in the Kitchen, refusing bids from established publishing houses that came in as the book sales became a success; Hunter was concerned about maintaining control over the book's contents. At Pine Cone Press, she worked with Florida A&M University journalism professor Thelma Gorman as editor, and others from the university and in Tallahassee on art work and other aspects of publishing. Hunter intended the book's profits to go to an education fund.

In 1988, Hunter won a Florida Folk Heritage Award from the state of Florida, "given to outstanding folk artists and folk culture advocates who have made long-standing contributions to the folk cultural resources of the state." It was awarded at the annual Florida Folk Festival in White Springs, Florida, attended by an estimated 20,000 visitors.

== See also ==
- Edna Lewis
