= Café Nicholson =

- Interactive map of Café Nicholson

Restaurant information
- Established: 1948
- Closed: 1999
- Location: 323 East 58th Street, New York, New York, 10022, United States
- Coordinates: 40°45′35″N 73°57′49.7″W

Café Nicholson (originally at 147 East 57th St., and later at 323 East 58th Street) was a New York City restaurant that operated from 1948 to 1999. The establishment became a gathering place for members of the artistic, literary and cultural elite.

== History ==
Café Nicholson was opened in 1948 by Johnny Nicholson. Nicholson was born John Bulica (born September 5, 1916 in St. Louis) to Romanian immigrants, and he later adopted an uncle's surname. Nicholson moved to New York City after he was declared 4F and exempted from military service. He originally planned to work in fashion design, and obtained a job at Macy's department store. He went on to an unsuccessful position as a window dresser at Lord & Taylor, and then opened an antique and design shop, earning a reputation that prompted Lord & Taylor to rehire him. Growing tired of the design field, he vacationed in Europe and was inspired by Rome's Caffè Greco, he created the lavish Greco-Roman interior of Café Nicholson on Manhattan's Upper East Side.

Nicholson's friend, self-taught southern chef Edna Lewis, co-owned the restaurant until the mid-1970s, with her specialties being roast chicken with herbs and chocolate soufflé. Over the years Café Nicholson moved to several addresses on the Upper East Side, often closing for months at Nicholson's whim before closing for good in 1999. Nicholson died August 4, 2016.

Café Nicholson attracted members of high society as well as such artistic, literary and cultural figures such as Tennessee Williams, Gore Vidal, Jean Renoir and photographer Karl Bissinger.

Café Nicholson often was used as background for fashion-magazine photo shoots and advertisements. Filmmaker Woody Allen used the restaurant for a scene in his 1994 movie Bullets Over Broadway.
