= New Monrovia =

Populated place in Florida, United States

Coordinates: 27.1390°N 80.1913°W

New Monrovia was an African American community established near West Palm Beach, Florida in the area now known as Port Salerno.

There is a New Monrovia Park in Port Salerno, Florida. New Monrovia's one-room schoolhouse has been preserved. Costella Williams was the school's teacher for many years until it closed in the 1960s. It was submitted for a National Register of Historic Places listing in 2021. There is also a New Monrovia cemetery in Port Salerno. Teresa Clark owned the community's first store.

== Notable people ==
- Bossman Dlow

== See also ==
- Monrovia
