= The Taste of Country Cooking =

1976 cookbook by Edna Lewis

The Taste of Country Cooking is a 1976 cookbook by Edna Lewis. It is considered one of the most important cookbooks of the 20th century and is credited with inspiring the modern farm-to-table movement.

== Development and publication history ==
Lewis met cookbook editor Judith Jones while working in restaurants in Manhattan and Brooklyn. Jones was fascinated by Lewis's stories of growing up in Freetown, Virginia, and encouraged her to write a cookbook around those recollections. The development and publication of the book served as a turning point toward American regional cuisines in Jones' professional focus.

The cookbook was first published in 1976. By the 30th anniversary edition, it included a foreword by Alice Waters. The 50th anniversary edition was released in 2026 with a foreword by Toni Tipton-Martin.

== Importance ==
The cookbook is considered influential in American cuisine, particularly in the farm-to-table movement, and "pioneering" in Southern cuisine. According to Southern Living, the book is "credited with inspiring the modern farm-to-table movement". According to Saveur, it is "widely hailed as one of the most important cookbooks of the 20th century".

According to Tasting Table, before the book was published, "Southern food was too often dismissed as heavy or unsophisticated. Folks assumed the dishes were all rich in cream and low in nutrients".

According to Tasting Table, the book "became a manual for inspired Southern cooking and an institution in American food culture". Southern Living called it a "beloved classic". Saveur called it a "masterpiece" of Southern cuisine.

== Description ==
The book is organized seasonally to describe a typical year in the lives of the local community of Freetown, Virginia, where Lewis grew up on her family's farm, with recipes. Illustrations include ingredients, tools and equipment, livestock, images of work happening in fields, barns, or kitchens. Extensive sidebars and headnotes provide detail and advice.

It includes significant description of how the community, the founders of which were formerly enslaved, provided for themselves while living in poverty in the rural south and documents local foodways.

Aimee Levitt, writing for The Takeout in 2020, compared the book's ability to evoke a sense of nostalgia to memoirs such as Little House on the Prairie.
