= Aquagrill =

- Interactive map of Aquagrill

Restaurant information
- Established: 1996; 30 years ago
- Closed: June 17, 2020
- Owners: Jennifer and Jeremy Marshall
- Chef: Jeremy Marshall
- Food type: Seafood
- Location: 210 Spring Street (on the corner of Sixth Avenue), in SoHo in Manhattan, New York, New York, 10012, United States
- Coordinates: 40.72536°N 74.00381°W
- Website: www.aquagrill.com

Aquagrill was a seafood restaurant located at 210 Spring Street (on the corner of Sixth Avenue), in SoHo in Manhattan, in New York City. It was opened in 1996 by owners Jennifer and Jeremy Marshall and closed in June, 2020, due to the economic effects of the COVID-19 pandemic.

The menu included items such as tuna carpaccio, salmon tartare, crabcakes, falafel salmon, miso sea bass, mushroom truffle crusted cod, bouillabaisse, shrimp, lobster, clams and oysters. Jeremy Marshall was the chef. In 2017 Zagat's gave Aquagrill a food rating of 27, and awarded it Top 50 Best Restaurants in NYC, Best Brunch in NYC, Best Oyster Raw Bar and Best Seafood Restaurant. In 2013, Zagat's gave Aquagrill a food rating of 27. Jennifer Marshall was the Wine Director and Aquagrill's wine list has been awarded over two decades of the Wine Spectator's Award of Excellence and has been awarded The Best Short Wine List in America by Restauarant Hospitality magazine. Aquagrill has been awarded Tripadvisor's Best Seafood Restaurants in NYC and Trip Advisor's Certificate of Excellence

== See also ==
- Impact of the COVID-19 pandemic on the restaurant industry in the United States
- List of seafood restaurants
