= Edna Lewis =

American chef

Edna Regina Lewis
- Born: April 13, 1916; Freetown, Virginia, U.S.
- Died: February 13, 2006 (aged 89); Decatur, Georgia, U.S.
- Other name: Edna Kingston
- Occupations: Chef, teacher, author, seamstress
- Known for: American Southern cooking
- Spouse: Steven Kingston

Edna Regina Lewis (April 13, 1916 – February 13, 2006) was a renowned American chef, teacher, and author who helped refine the American view of Southern cooking. She championed the use of fresh, in season ingredients and characterized Southern food as fried chicken (pan-, not deep-fried), pork, and fresh vegetables – most especially greens. She wrote and co-wrote four books which covered Southern cooking and life in a small community of freed slaves and their descendants, including The Taste of Country Cooking and In Pursuit of Flavor.

== Early life and career ==
Lewis was born in 1916 in the small farming settlement of Freetown (near Lahore) in Orange County, Virginia, the granddaughter of an emancipated slave who helped start the community. She was one of eight children. Lewis's father died in 1928 when she was 12, and at 16 she left Freetown on her own and joined the Great Migration north. When Lewis left Freetown she moved to Washington, D.C., and eventually to New York City in her early 30s. While in D.C. Lewis worked for Franklin D. Roosevelt's 2nd presidential campaign in 1936. At some point, between D.C. and New York City, Edna Lewis married Steven Kingston, a retired Merchant Marine cook and a Communist.

When she arrived in New York, an acquaintance found her a job in a Brooklyn laundry, where she was assigned to an ironing board. She had never ironed and lasted three hours before she was dismissed. She had experience in sewing and soon found work as a seamstress. As a seamstress she copied Christian Dior dresses for Dorcas Avedon, then the wife of Richard Avedon, amongst others (including a dress for Marilyn Monroe); she also created African-inspired dresses – for which she was well-known. While in New York, she also worked for the communist newspaper The Daily Worker and was involved in political demonstrations.

== Café Nicholson and The Taste of Country Cooking ==
While in New York City, Lewis began throwing dinner parties for her friends and acquaintances and John Nicholson, an antiques dealer, was one of those friends. In 1948 on 58th Street, in East Side Manhattan, Nicholson opened Café Nicholson with Lewis as cook, which became an instant success among bohemians and artists. The restaurant was frequented by William Faulkner, Marlon Brando, Tennessee Williams, Truman Capote, Richard Avedon, Gloria Vanderbilt, Marlene Dietrich, Eleanor Roosevelt, and Diana Vreeland. At the Café, Lewis served a neat menu of simple, Southern inspired dishes, including a chocolate soufflé, for which she was known.

After five years there, Lewis left Café Nicholson and from there she spent time as a pheasant farmer in New Jersey until the entire flock died one evening from an unidentified disease. She opened and closed her own restaurant, catered for friends and acquaintances, taught cooking lessons, and even became a docent in the Hall of African Peoples in the American Museum of Natural History. In the late 1960s, she broke her leg and was temporarily forced to stop cooking professionally. With encouragement from Judith Jones, the cookbook editor at Knopf who also edited Julia Child, Evangeline Peterson and Lewis worked together to write The Edna Lewis Cookbook (1972). However, Jones found the cookbook "fashionable but tasteless" and in turn worked with Lewis on her own to write The Taste of Country Cooking in 1976. The Taste of Country Cooking contained as many recipes as it did information about Southern and African-American food – successfully capturing the spirit and stories Lewis had to share – which was Jones's intention with the book.

In 2017, nearly forty years after its publication, The Taste of Country Cooking saw an abrupt and newsworthy spike in US sales, ranking #5 overall and #3 in the cookbook category on Amazon's bestseller list – this spike followed its thematic inclusion in an episode of the cooking competition show Top Chef.

== Later career ==
After Lewis's husband died, she returned to the restaurant business, working at such places as Fearrington House in Pittsboro, North Carolina; Middleton Place in Charleston, South Carolina; U.S. Steak House in New York City; and the historic Gage and Tollner in Brooklyn, New York, where she worked for five years before retiring in 1995. In 1986 Lewis adopted a young adult, Dr. Afeworki Paulos (a lecturer at the University of Michigan), after he arrived from Eritrea to study in the United States. She wrote In Pursuit of Flavor in 1988. In the late 1980s she founded the Society for the Revival and Preservation of Southern Food – which was a precursor to the Southern Foodways Alliance (SFA). In a 1989 interview with The New York Times, Lewis said: "As a child in Virginia, I thought all food tasted delicious. After growing up, I didn't think food tasted the same, so it has been my lifelong effort to try and recapture those good flavors of the past."

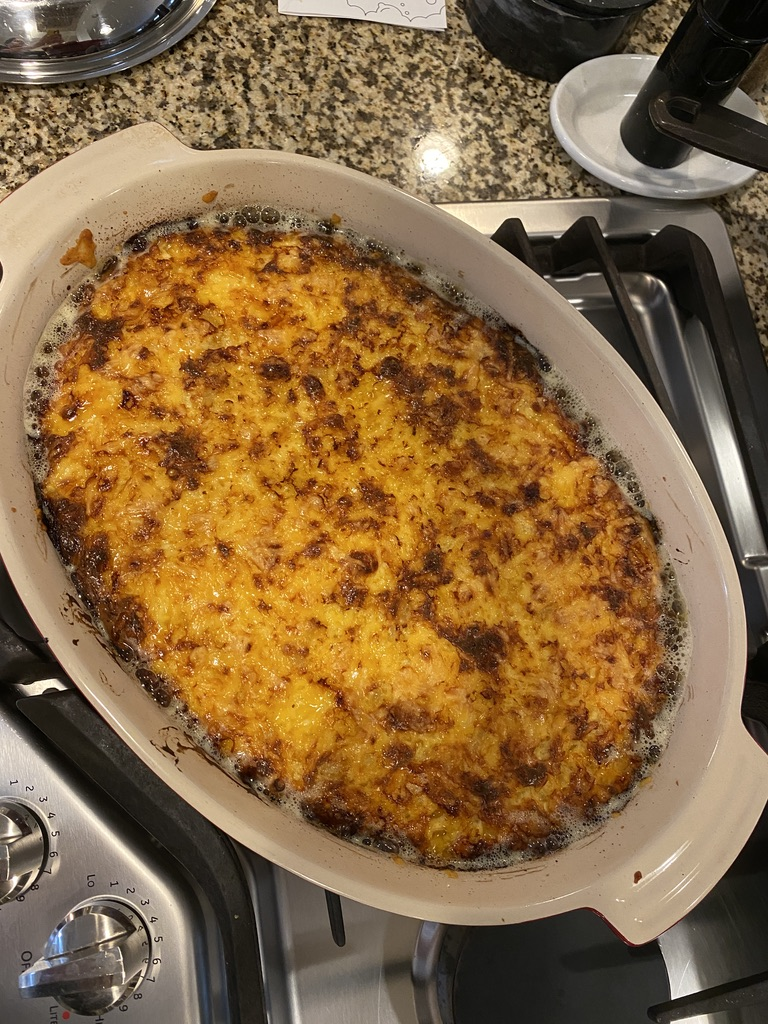
Macaroni & Cheese from The Gift of Southern Cooking

The Society for the Revival and Preservation of Southern Food was dedicated in part, to seeing that people did not forget how to cook with lard. Throughout the 1990s, she won several awards (see below) and befriended a chef named Scott Peacock, after meeting him while he was a cook in the Georgia Governor's Mansion in 1990. The two formed a deep friendship, with Lewis moving to Atlanta to be near Peacock in 1992, and they eventually collaborated on the book The Gift of Southern Cooking (2003). Their long standing friendship – and seemingly at odds personas (he – a younger, gay European American man and she – an older, widowed African American woman) resulted in them being referred to as "The Odd Couple of Southern Cooking". For the rest of her life, Lewis and Peacock would work together to try and ensure that classic Southern dishes and details would not be forgotten – as they were both deeply dedicated to the preservation of Southern cooking. As Lewis aged, Peacock would go on to become her caretaker up until her death in 2006.

== Awards and honors ==
- 1986 – Named Who's Who in American Cooking by Cook’s Magazine
- 1990 – Lifetime Achievement Award, International Association of Culinary Professionals
- 1995 – James Beard Living Legend Award (their first such award)
- 1999 – Named Grande Dame by Les Dames d’Escoffier, an international organization of female culinary professionals.
- 1999 – Lifetime Achievement Award from Southern Foodways Alliance (SFA) (their first such award)
- 2002 – Barbara Tropp President's Award, Women Chefs & Restaurateurs
- 2003 – Inducted into the KitchenAid Cookbook Hall of Fame (James Beard)
- 2004 – The Gift of Southern Cooking nominated for James Beard Award and IACP Award
- 2009 – African American Trailblazers in Virginia honoree at the Library of Virginia (in Richmond)
- 2014 – Honored by creation of United States postal stamp with her image

== Other recognition ==
According to Food & Wine, it is "impossible to overstate the importance of Edna Lewis in the pantheon of American chefs – especially in the realm of Southern cuisine". In 1979, Craig Claiborne of The New York Times wrote The Taste of Country Cooking "may well be the most entertaining regional cookbook in America". Food & Wine in 2025 said it was "widely regarded as one of the most important cookbooks of the 20th century".

== Legacy ==
According to PBS, Lewis "changed the way the world saw Southern food and the way we eat".

== Published works ==
- The Edna Lewis Cookbook (1972) 4th edition
- The Taste of Country Cooking (1976) 4th edition
- In Pursuit of Flavor (1988) 4th edition
- The Gift of Southern Cooking (2003), co-authored with Scott Peacock

== See also ==
- Bill Neal
- Flora Mae Hunter
