= Joan Nathan =

American cookbook writer

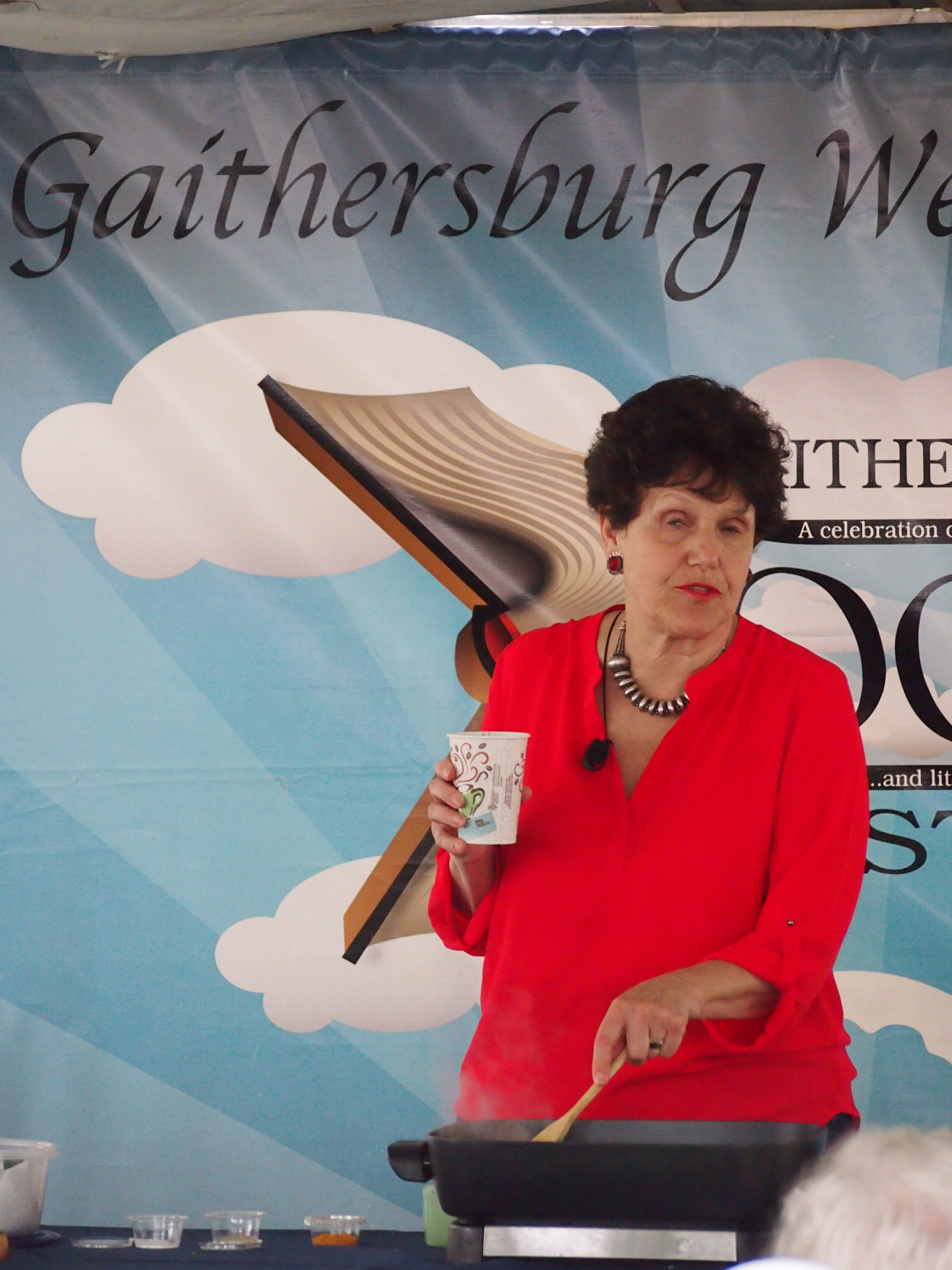
- Born: January 26, 1943 (age 83); Providence, Rhode Island, U.S.
- Education: University of Michigan (M.A.) Harvard University (M.P.A.)
- Occupations: Food journalist; Author; TV producer
- Writing career
- Language: English
- Subject: Jewish cooking
- Notable works: Jewish Cooking in America; The Jewish Holiday Kitchen; The New American Cooking
- Website: joannathan.com

Joan Nathan (born January 26, 1943) is an American cookbook author and newspaper journalist. She has produced TV documentaries on the subject of Jewish cuisine. She was a co-founder of New York's Ninth Avenue Food Festival under then-Mayor Abraham Beame. The Jerusalem Post has called her the "matriarch of Jewish cooking".

== Early life and education ==
Joan Nathan was born in Providence, Rhode Island, to Jewish parents Pearl (née Gluck) Nathan and Ernest Nathan. As a child, she travled to other countries with her father, a German businessman. After receiving a master's degree in French literature from the University of Michigan, she earned another master's degree in public administration from Harvard University's John F. Kennedy School of Government. After graduating with her degree in French literature, Nathan worked as a French and English bilingual assistant at the United Nations. At the Kennedy School, she took a class on ethnicity and politics taught by future New York senator Daniel Patrick Moynihan.

It was during her time in Jerusalem working for Teddy Kollek that she became interested in the food people served in their homes. This led to the first of her cookbooks, The Flavor of Jerusalem, co-written with Judy Stacey Goldman. As a food journalist she has visited, among other places, France and Brazil, uncovering new dishes or researching Jewish cuisine.

== Career ==
=== Television ===
She was executive producer and host of Jewish Cooking in America with Joan Nathan, a PBS series based on her cookbook, Jewish Cooking in America. The series follows Nathan as she travels across the United States, visiting the kitchens of celebrities, chefs, and other notable Jewish cooks as she explores Jewish culture and history throughout the nation. The success of the series helped Nathan earn the distinction of being called the "Jewish Julia Child" in the media. In 2000, the series was nominated for best national television food show at the James Beard Awards.

=== Journalism ===
Nathan has contributed to numerous newspapers and magazines, including Saveur, Food & Wine, The Denver Post, Better Homes and Gardens, CNN, The Atlantic, Los Angeles Times, and The Washington Post. She is a regular food columnist for The New York Times and Tablet.

=== Cookbooks ===
Nathan has written twelve cookbooks, winning numerous awards for them. Six are about Jewish cuisine and two on Israeli cuisine. Her goal is to preserve Jewish traditions by interviewing cooks and documenting their recipes and stories for posterity.

In 1985, An American Folklife Cookbook won the R.T. French Tastemaker Award (now the James Beard Award). The New American Cooking won the James Beard and IACP Awards for Food of the Americas and Best American Cookbook. She was guest curator of Food Culture USA at the 2005 Smithsonian Folklife Festival, which was based on the research for her book.

Two decades later, in 2005, Jewish Cooking in America won the Julia Child Award for Best Cookbook of the Year, and the James Beard Award (again) for Food of the Americas. In 2017, the IACP: International Association of Culinary Professionals honored Jewish Cooking in America as a Culinary Classic.

Her 2024 memoir, My Life in Recipes: Food, Family, and Memories, includes recipes passed down through her family, including her German great-grandmother’s challah made with mashed potatoes.

- The Flavor of Jerusalem (1975), with Judy Stacey Goldman. ISBN 978-0-316-59843-9
- The Jewish Holiday Kitchen (1979) ISBN 978-0-8052-0724-8
- An American Folklife Cookbook (1984) ISBN 978-0-8052-3914-0
- The Children's Jewish Holiday Kitchen (1987) ISBN 978-0-8052-4130-3
- Jewish Cooking in America (1994) ISBN 978-0-375-40276-0
- The Jewish Holiday Baker (1997) ISBN 978-0-8052-4142-6
- The Foods of Israel Today (2001) ISBN 978-0-679-45107-5
- Joan Nathan's Jewish Holiday Cookbook (2004) ISBN 978-0-8052-4217-1
- The New American Cooking (2005) ISBN 978-1-4000-4034-6
- Quiches, Kugels and Couscous: My Search for Jewish Cooking in France (2010) ISBN 978-0-307-26759-7
- King Solomon's Table: A Culinary Exploration of Jewish Cooking from Around the World (2017) ISBN 978-0-385-35114-0
- My Life in Recipes: Food, Family, and Memories (2024) ISBN 978-0-525-65898-6
- A Sweet Year: Jewish Celebrations and Festive Recipes, (2024) ISBN 978-0-593-80189-5

== Personal life ==
=== Israel ===
Starting in 1970, Nathan lived in Israel for three years working for Mayor Teddy Kollek of Jerusalem becoming his foreign press attaché.

=== Marriage ===
In 1974, Nathan married Allan Gerson, an attorney whom she met in Isreal. In 1977, they moved to Washington D.C. Nathan has three children and two grandchildren. She divides her time between Washington, D.C. and Martha's Vineyard.

== Awards ==
- 2018, Creativity Award, Moment Magazine
- 2015, Grande Dame Award, Les Dames d'Escoffier International
- 2011, [with her husband, Allan] Special Recognition Award from the YIVO Institute for Jewish Research for her contribution to preserving Jewish culture
- 2008, MacDowell Fellow, the MacDowell Colony
- 2005, Silver Spoon Award, Food Arts Magazine
- 2002, Honorary doctorate from the Spertus Institute of Jewish Culture
- 2001, Inductee into James Beard Foundation's Who's Who in American Food and Beverage
- 1998, Jewish Daily Forward "Forward 50"
- 1995, Golda Award, American Jewish Congress
- 1994, Jewish Cooking in America received the James Beard Award for Best American Cookbook and later, the IACP/Julia Child Cookbook of the Year Award

== Guest appearances ==
- Good Morning America
- The TODAY Show
- Live with Regis and Kathie Lee
- Food Network
- The Martha Stewart Show
- All Things Considered and Weekend Edition

== Other ==
In January 2009, she began choking on a piece of chicken at the Art.Food.Hope dinner in Washington, D.C., but was saved by chef Tom Colicchio, who performed the Heimlich maneuver.
