= Scott Peacock =

American chef

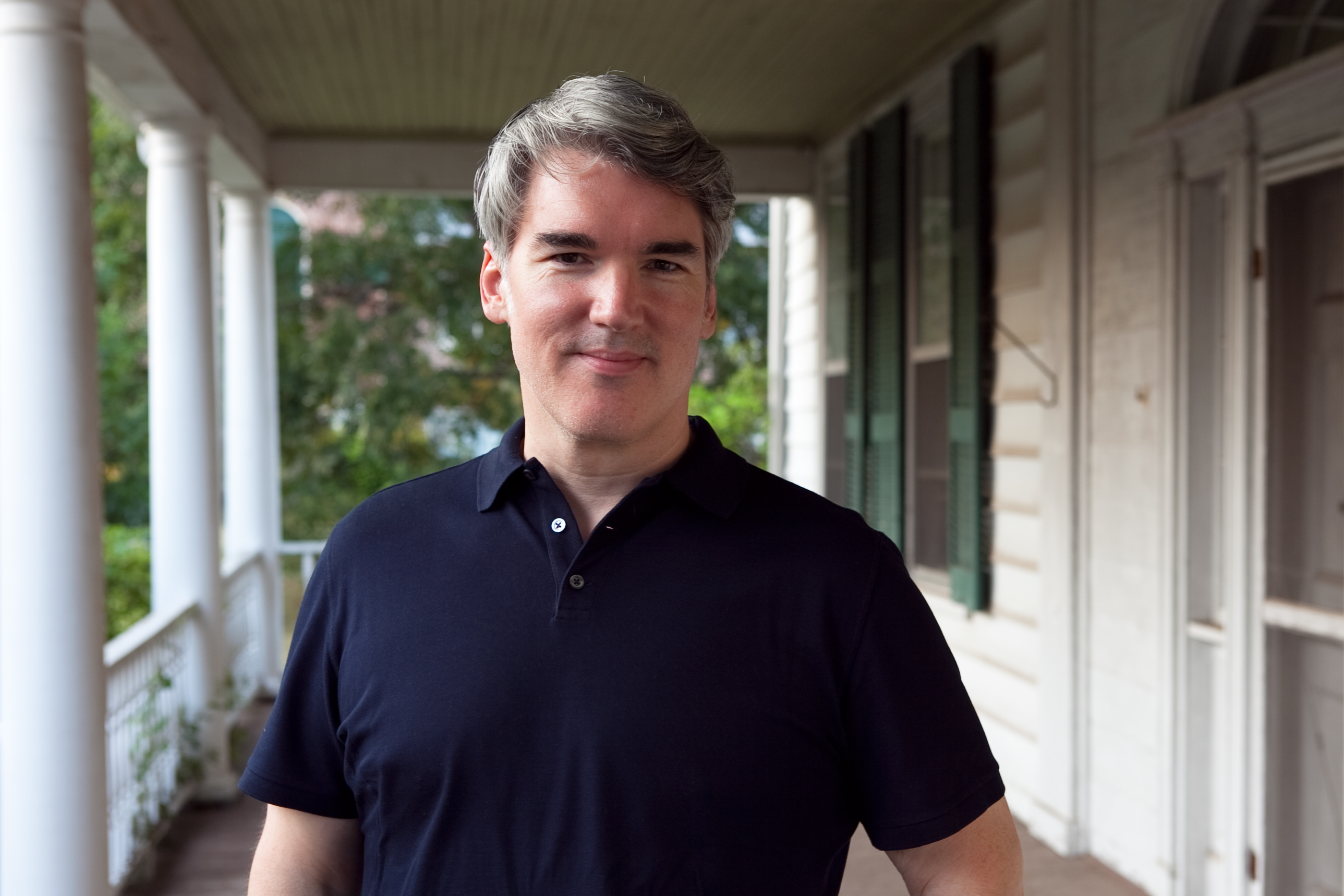
- Born: 1963; Hartford, Alabama
- Culinary career
- Cooking style: American Southern
- Website: chefscottpeacock.com

Scott Peacock (born 1963) is a chef of American Southern cuisine.

== Early life ==
Scott Peacock was born and grew up in Hartford, Alabama. Southern Cooking and Gulf Coast seafood were his earliest culinary influences. Food was picked, cooked, and eaten fresh. He also developed a love for French cooking through Julia Child's popular television series and decided to pursue a career as a chef.

== Career ==
Peacock began his career as pastry chef at Tallahassee’s The Golden Pheasant. From there he moved to the Georgia governor’s mansion where he worked for two governors over four years. After that, he started Atlanta’s Horseradish Grill. From there he moved to Watershed restaurant, also in Atlanta. He left Watershed in 2010 to devote his time to writing and documentary film.

Scott Peacock and Edna Lewis first met in the late 1980s, and together they wrote The Gift of Southern Cooking (Knopf, 2003). Lewis spent the last six years of her life living at Peacock’s Decatur, Georgia, home.

After leaving his Watershed restaurant in 2010, Peacock moved to Marion, Alabama, where he renovated the kitchen of an antebellum mansion, known as Reverie.

== Publications and awards ==
The James Beard Foundation awarded Scott Peacock "Best Chef in the Southeast" in May 2007.

Since February 2009 Scott Peacock has been a contributing editor and columnist for Better Homes and Gardens magazine. In 2018, Food and Wine named Peacock's fried chicken recipe as one of the "40 best recipes ever published".
