= Peter Guttman (photographer) =

American travel journalist

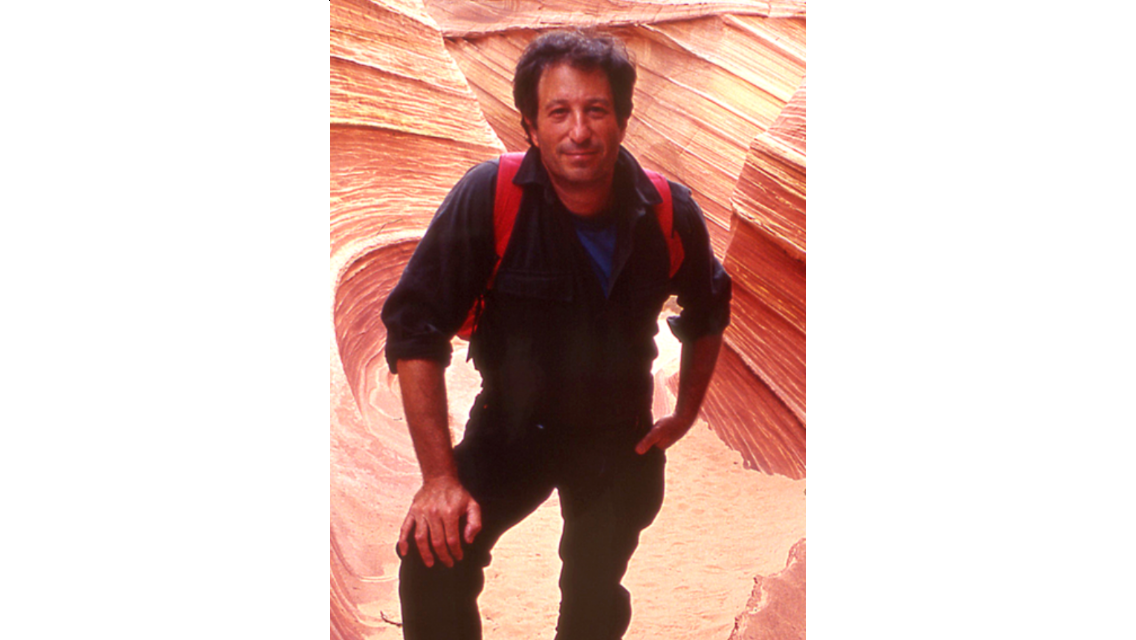
- Born: Peter Guttman; Roswell, New Mexico, U.S.
- Occupations: Travel journalist, author and lecturer
- Notable credit(s): Named a Fellow of the Explorer's Club, three-time recipient of Lowell Thomas Travel Journalist of the Year Award, author of ten books and creator of best selling iPad travel apps

Peter Guttman is an American author, photographer, lecturer, television personality and adventurer, was named a Fellow of the Explorers Club, and has traveled on assignment through over 260 countries across seven continents.

== Early life ==
Peter Guttman was born in Roswell, New Mexico and grew up in the Fresh Meadows neighborhood of Queens in New York City. As a five-year-old, he received early recognition of his visual skills when his artwork was exhibited at the Lever House on Manhattan's Park Avenue. By the age of twelve, Guttman received notice for engaging in medical research involving the artificial heart. He advanced ideas for the development of an internal power source, and established relationships with such pioneering doctors as Adrian Kantrowitz, Michael DeBakey and Willem Kolff, who invited Peter to spend time with him at the Cleveland Clinic.

When his newfound interest in photography was sparked, he was given a Nikon camera by his grandmother at age 17. He graduated from Francis Lewis High School and received a degree in geography from Binghamton University, where his unconventional dormitory room was transformed into installation art of hand-built kinetic machines and collected objects amassed from early travels, becoming a must-see tourist attraction which received newspaper coverage. Hours before his university graduation ceremony, Guttman went skydiving, jump-starting a lifetime of collecting adventurous experiences. As a graduate, extensive tour guiding experience across North America helped develop his storytelling skills.

== Career ==
Guttman is a visual storyteller seeking out the world's hidden corners through decades-long explorations. His body of work, which often investigates indigenous peoples and exotic wildlife, is supplemented by substantial elements of writing and research while employing innovative shooting techniques. Long before the GoPro, drones and selfie sticks, he would create surrealistic mid-air suspension shots, either utilizing his tripod as a fishing rod or attaching his camera to the wings of Allagash Wilderness floatplanes or the sails of Mojave Desert land yachts.

During his global travels, he has climbed the riggings of tall ships, hiked onto volcanic lava flows, tracked gorillas in tropical rain forests and chased tornadoes across the great plains. His adventures have led him to summit Mount Kilimanjaro in Africa, swim with pink dolphins in the Amazon and sail an icebreaker to the North Pole. His images include Antarctic penguin colonies, Papua New Guinea tribesmen, indigenous Arctic nomads and camel adventures through the Namib desert. Primarily shooting film, Guttman's images often depicted the pre-digital societies of wrangling cowboys, eel trappers and rattlesnake hunters, attempting to capture their cultural iconography.

Guttman is the creator of the influential "To Imagine" hardcover book series, a visual chronicle of magical lodging, adventures and experiences around the world, published by Fodor's Travel Publications. He later created both the "Photographic" and "Surprising" hardcover book series for Skyhorse Publishing, pictorial narratives of his global explorations and discoveries. His work has been featured in Calvin Klein and American Express calendars, spreads in Life (magazine) for which he was nominated for an Alfred Eisenstaedt Award for Magazine Photography and has appeared in Conde Nast Traveler, National Geographic Adventure, and Geo. Guttman has also penned stories for The Los Angeles Times, The Dallas Morning News, New York and Outside magazines, among others. In 2019, his circuitous career path and quest to attain a lifetime tightly packed with experiences were chronicled in his well regarded TEDx talk, "Ensuring Your Soul Doesn't Grow Gray Before Your Hair Does," given at the 1,170-seat Osterhout Concert Theater in Binghamton University's Anderson Center. In 2022, he was named a Global Ambassador for Low Season Traveller, a new concept for international tourism. Guttman was named a Fellow of The Explorers Club in 2023, joining the ranks of renowned alumni such as Ernest Shackleton, Jacques Cousteau and Buzz Aldrin. He was cited for the "sheer diversity and thoroughness of his exploration experience."

Guttman taught travel photography in New York at the International Center of Photography and his frequent slide show lectures have been met with wide national attention. His career as a travel journalist has been profiled on A&E Television and he has appeared on NBC's Today, CNN Travel Guide and the Travel Channel. In a 2009 Kodak tribute to Kodachrome, on the occasion of the film's retirement after 74 years, Guttman was one of three photographers specifically referenced on their website as one of the "world's greatest photographers" and his work with that film was displayed in both slide shows and podcasts. Hundreds of Guttman's images and extensive text comprise innovative multimedia presentations on a series of applications designed for the iPad, iPhone and iPod Touch. Best selling Beautiful Planet HD and Rooms with a View have been featured by Apple as Staff Favorites and, along with Children Around the World, have gathered numerous honors in the media. In 2008, the coffee table book "Rare" published by Daab included Guttman's portrait in a roster of "amazing individuals" and "people of significance." His work has been seen at museums, amongst films, on postage stamps and in the collection of both astronauts and international royalty.

== Books ==
Guttman is the author of "Nights to Imagine: Magical Places to Stay in America," "Adventures to Imagine: Thrilling Escapes in North America" and "Worlds to Imagine: Dream Journeys for Romantic Travelers," comprising the Fodor's "To Imagine" series which he created. He later published "Escape to Northern New England" also by Fodor's.

"Peter Guttman: Faces of the World," a complete chapter of the "Kodak Guide to Shooting Great Travel Pictures" featured his career and portrait work. A chapter about Guttman's work and accomplishments, based on interviews with the New York Institute of Photography, appears in "Top Travel Photo Tips: From Ten Pro Photographers."

Guttman also created the "Photographic" series, for Skyhorse Publishing including "Christmas in America: A Photographic Celebration of the Holiday Season," now in its third edition, as well as Guttman's sixth hardcover book, "Extreme Adventure: A Photographic Exploration of Wild Experiences" which includes ice climbing in the Rockies, land yachting in the Mojave Desert and scaling the girders of Australia's Sydney Harbour Bridge. His seventh book, "By the Sea: A Photographic Voyage Around the Blue Planet" portrays earth's nautical cultures from canoe flotillas of grass-skirted warriors in Irian Jaya to mailboat journeys through Norwegian fjords. Guttman's eighth book, "Children Around the World: A Photographic Treasury of the Next Generation" provides a comprehensive survey of the planet's youth, and a roster of their intriguing, exotic habitats that range widely from Saudi Arabia to Mali. That book was published in a Japanese edition as well.

The third book series created by Guttman debuted in 2024 with the publication of American Character: Surprising Portraits of an Unseen Nation, a critically acclaimed peek into various somewhat-obscure cultural lifestyles existing across the United States. Launching the “Surprising” series, this book examines cultures such as the Yupik walrus hunters, Texan rattlesnake wranglers, and Cajun bayou dwellers, among others. Guttman’s tenth hardcover book Secret Wonders: Surprising Adventures for the Intrepid Traveler focuses on little-known tourist destinations and travel experiences.

== Exhibitions ==
In 2005, an exhibition of his work, "The Magical Worlds of Peter Guttman" was shown at the American Film Festival in Deauville, France and in 2006, Guttman had a solo photographic retrospective of his work at Sotheby's in New York City, where he was the first living artist to be honored with an entire floor featuring his work. His photographic images of the Amazon were featured in a 2008 exhibition at the United Nations. In 2014, at the Temple of Heaven in Beijing, China, Guttman's work was featured in a major exhibition of the world's most influential photographers assembled by Kodak Alaris and the George Eastman House International Museum of Photography and Film. Later that year, he made a joint appearance at the George Eastman House International Museum of Photography and Film with his teenage son Chase Guttman, himself a frequent winner of international awards for travel photography. In 2018, Binghamton University Art Museum mounted a major retrospective of his photography, "Beautiful Pictures" which included a main gallery projection of Guttman's iPad app "Beautiful Planet" as well as a live performance of original orchestral pieces composed with inspiration derived from his photography. An accompanying focus exhibition, "Peter Guttman: Collection as Self Portrait" recreates his New York City living room, this exhibit was curated in part by Dr. Pamela Smart, and several of the museum studies program students including Taylor Hayes, Ashley Blake, Jenna Valone, and Maxx Mercogliano.

== Awards ==
Guttman's work in magazines, newspapers and books have resulted three times in him being honored as the Lowell Thomas Travel Journalist of the Year, awarded by the Society of American Writers. "Adventures to Imagine" won the Benjamin Franklin Award as Best Travel Guide and was cited in "The Experience Economy: Work Is Theater & Every Business a Stage" (Harvard Business School Press) as a landmark indication of society's new emphasis on experiences. Guttman twice received the Northern Lights Award for Excellence in Travel Journalism and Photography for his iPhone and iPad apps, Rooms with a View, and the number one bestselling iPad travel app Beautiful Planet HD. Beautiful Planet HD was also named by NBC News as one of "eight outstanding apps" for students. In 2012, Children Around the World, created for the iPad, was selected as one of the "Best Book Apps of 2012" from Kirkus Reviews.

In 2013 Guttman was honored with a Lifetime Achievement Award by the New York Travel Writers Society. Guttman was a finalist in the international Travel Photographer of the Year 2013 competition. Guttman received a 2014 George Eastman Power of the Image Award in conjunction with a photography exhibition, Power of the Image, at the Temple of Heaven in Beijing, China when he was cited as one of twenty of the world's most influential photographers.

Binghamton University honored Guttman with their inaugural Alumni Achievement Award in 2015, recognizing decades of "outstanding, significant professional achievement" and in describing the event in their magazine, recognized his extensive research abilities, noting that "before Google there was Guttman." Guttman received the 2017 Walter Cronkite Award for Excellence in Exploration and Storytelling, an honor awarded to both him and his son Chase Guttman. In 2022, he was again honored by the Society of American Travel Writers with a Lowell Thomas Award for Instagram Storytelling. In 2025, his frequently lauded American Character hardcover garnered the Gold Lowell Thomas Award for Best Travel Book of the Year, and a New York Sun literary review compared his work to Walt Whitman. A biographical profile for an Arts in the City television segment reported by Donna Hanover in 2025 featured Guttman’s career and garnered three Telly Awards.
