= Barbara Tropp =

American orientalist, chef, restaurateur and food writer

- Born: 1948; Springfield, New Jersey, U.S.
- Died: October 26, 2001 (aged 52–53); San Francisco, California, U.S.
- Education: Barnard College
- Alma mater: Princeton University
- Occupations: Orientalist; Chef; Restaurateur; Writer
- Notable work: China Moon Cookbook (1992); The Modern Art of Chinese Cooking: Techniques and Recipes (1982)
- Spouse: Bart Rhoades
- Awards: James Beard Award (1989)

Barbara Tropp (1948 – October 26, 2001) was an American orientalist, chef, restaurateur, and food writer. During her career, she operated China Moon restaurant in San Francisco and wrote cookbooks that popularized Chinese cuisine in America. China Moon's accompanying cookbook is credited with being one of the first fusion cuisine cookbooks. She was the 1989 recipient of the Who's Who of Food & Beverage in America James Beard Award. Tropp was called "the Julia Child of Chinese cooking."

== Early life and education ==
Barbara Tropp was born in 1948 in Springfield, New Jersey. Both her parents were Jewish and podiatrists. She had one sibling, Nhumey. Tropp's family had little influence on her later culinary career. She described her mother's home cooking as "adequate". Her grandmother was German and cooked traditional German food. The majority of her exposure to Chinese food was the Friday night Chinese take out her family ate each week. Tropp described herself as an introvert growing up. She became interested in Chinese culture after studying it in a high school art class.

She attended Barnard College and graduated with honors in Oriental studies. Tropp earned her master's degree from Princeton University in Chinese literature and art. She stayed at Princeton, on a Woodrow Wilson Fellowship, to pursue a doctorate in poetry. Her professors at Princeton suggested she study poetry at National Taiwan University. She did so, living with two host families who cooked traditional Chinese cuisine. The head of the household of one of the families was Po-fu. Tropp credited Po-fu with introducing her to traditional and gourmet Chinese food and preparation. In Taiwan, she also shopped at local markets and patronized food stalls. She returned to the U.S., fluent in Mandarin, to continue her studies at Princeton.

Upon her return, Tropp obsessed about the food she had eaten and observed being prepared in Taiwan. She bought cookbooks and taught herself how to cook Chinese food. She struggled to complete her thesis, preferring her culinary interests over academia. She taught cooking classes and catered for extra income as her fellowship began to run out. Tropp dropped out of Princeton and moved to San Francisco.

== Career and life ==
Upon moving to San Francisco, Tropp settled near Chinatown. Eventually, she was contracted by James Beard to write a cookbook: The Modern Art of Chinese Cooking: Techniques and Recipes in 1982. As a result of the book, she traveled nationally, teaching cooking classes. She worked in the kitchen at Greens, a San Francisco vegetarian restaurant. In 1983, she opened China Moon in a former diner in San Francisco. The Los Angeles Times described the food at China Moon as "authentic in taste but Californian in its spirit of artistic expression." That same year, Martha Stewart published her book Entertaining. The book featured a collection of Chinese recipes which were plagiarized from Tropp's book, The Modern Art of Chinese Cooking. Stewart agreed to give Tropp credit in future editions of the book. In 1989, she appeared on Great Chefs. She was also awarded the Who's Who of Food & Beverage in America James Beard Award.

The China Moon Cookbook was published in 1992. The New York Times called it "one of the first books that successfully brought together Chinese and European-American mainstream cooking." The book was awarded an International Association of Culinary Professionals Cookbook Award. She co-founded the organization Women Chefs and Restaurateurs in 1993 with Joyce Goldstein and other women in the industry.

In 1994, Tropp's sister, Nhumey, called her to tell Tropp that their mother had died of ovarian cancer at the age of 48. Prior to this, they did not know what kind of cancer their mother had died from. Nhumey had researched medical records to find the cause of death. Due to concerns about ovarian cancer being passed down genetically, Nhumey had a oophorectomy and it was confirmed she had ovarian cancer. Tropp also had an oophorectomy and it was also confirmed she had ovarian cancer. Tropp had chemotherapy for one year coupled with Chinese medicinal and herbal treatments. In 1996, she sold China Moon due to her declining health. She also took time off from writing.

Tropp eventually stopped her Western cancer treatments when her cancer was in remission. She continued to use medicinal Chinese treatments. While in Asia, with her husband Bart Rhoades, her cancer returned. Back in California, she started chemotherapy again.

== Later life and death ==
By 1999, Tropp continued chemotherapy for ovarian cancer. She returned to work, writing for Gourmet, teaching cooking classes, and hosting food tours in San Francisco. She, her husband and stepdaughter, split their time between San Francisco and their home in Napa Valley.

In October 2001, she was awarded the Women Chefs and Restaurateurs' President's Award. Weeks later, on October 26, she died of ovarian cancer at her San Francisco apartment.

Tropp's book, The Modern Art of Chinese Cooking: Techniques & Recipes, was awarded the KitchenAid Cookbook Hall of Fame James Beard Award in 2004.

== Selected works ==
- China Moon Cookbook. New York: Workman Publishing Company (1992). ISBN 0894807544
- The Modern Art of Chinese Cooking: Techniques and Recipes. New York: Morrow (1982). ISBN 0688005667
