= Lahore, Virginia =

Unincorporated community in Virginia, United States

Lahore
- Unincorporated community
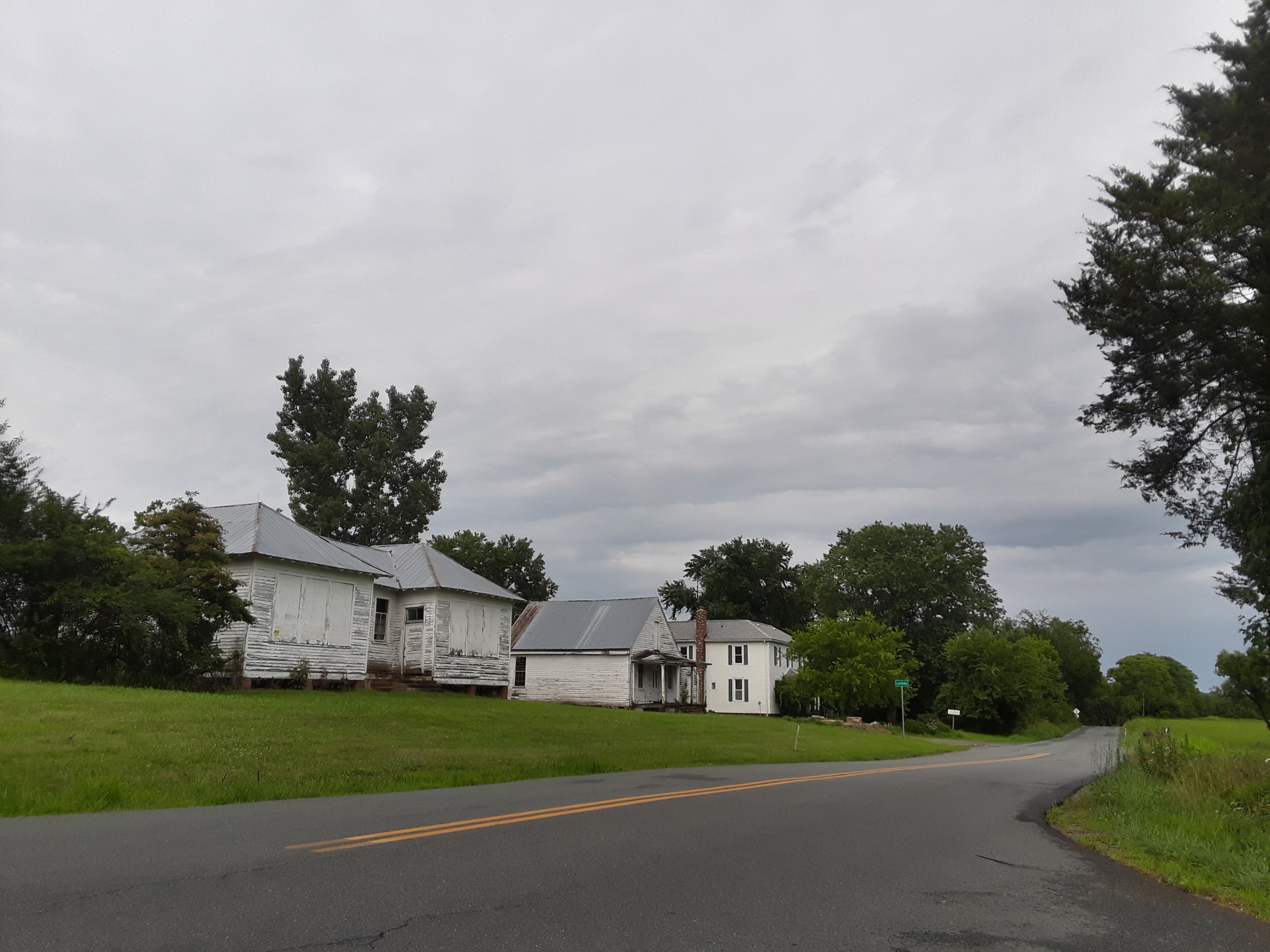
- Lahore in July, 2023
- Interactive map of Lahore
- Coordinates: 38°11′56″N 77°58′6″W
- Country: United States
- State: Virginia
- County: Orange
- Elevation: 364 ft (111 m)

Population (2010)
  - Total: 1,111
  - Estimate (2019): 5,096
- Time zone: UTC−5 (Eastern (EST))
  - Summer (DST): UTC−4 (EDT)
- ZIP code: 22567
- Area code: 540

Lahore (/ləˈhɔːr/ lə-HOR) is an unincorporated community in Orange County, Virginia, United States, which was named after the historical city of Lahore, Pakistan. It is in the Eastern Standard time zone. The elevation is 364 feet (111 m).

The village was named in the 1800s by the owner of a general store, after reading and studying a book about the Subcontinent.

== Purchase of lands ==
Noor Naghmi, son of Pakistani broadcaster Abul Hasan Naghmi, brought the American Lahore into the news in 2007. The junior Naghmi is a financial services professional in Vienna, Virginia. After a years-long negotiation with farmer Nancy Wallace, who owned 235 acres (0.95 km^{2}) of American Lahore (including the center of the town), Naghmi was able to strike a deal for $3 million.

Naghmi told the Washington Post in 2007 that his $3 million deal would turn Lahore, Virginia into a regional tourist attraction for South Asians and others.

As of 2021 the property had not been sold to Noor or anyone else. The owner had died and the estate had not yet been settled.
