= Freedmen's town =

Type of American municipality founded by former slaves

In the United States, a freedmen's town was an African American municipality or community built by freedmen, formerly enslaved people who were emancipated during and after the American Civil War. These towns emerged in a number of states, most notably Texas. In the Piedmont region of Virginia, they were known as freetowns, usually places near or bordering where formerly enslaved African Americans lived and worked on plantations under the system of chattel slavery, oftentimes on lands donated by former masters. They are also known as freedom colonies, from the title of a book by Sitton and Conrad.

== History ==
The Emancipation Proclamation and the Thirteenth Amendment brought 4 million people out of slavery in the defunct Confederate States of America plus the four "border" slave states that did not secede. Many freed people were faced with the questions of where they would go and how they would support themselves to survive. Many decided to remain on plantations working as sharecroppers. Many freedmen migrated from white areas to build their own towns away from white supervision. They also created their own churches and civic organizations. Freedmen's settlements had a greater measure of protection from the direct effects of Jim Crow. "Such places were defensive communities, where black property owners had circled the wagons against outsiders—a "fortress without walls." Freedmen's settlements were black enclaves that kept to themselves and until the end of Jim Crow few whites wished—or dared—to live there”.

== Education ==
Education was of the highest priority for the residents of freedmen towns. They started schools, which both adults and children attended to learn to read and write. By 1915 schools built in the Freedmen's settlements were mostly small frame one or two room structures. Textbooks for the schools were typically donated from white schools, but often they were in poor condition. Teachers were very serious about discipline, which was strictly enforced by, for example, switching students with a brush or making them stand in a corner on one leg.

== Freedmen's Bureau and Reconstruction ==
To provide help in education and managing the transition of the people to freedom, including negotiation of labor contracts and establishing the Freedmen's Bank, President Abraham Lincoln created the Freedmen's Bureau. In 1865, Secretary of War Edwin Stanton was looking for an army officer to run the Freedmen's Bureau. General Ulysses S. Grant proposed General John Eaton, a chaplain with an established reputation as a humanitarian, and who had had authority over Black refugees after the Civil War. However, the position of Bureau commissioner went to another Christian general and Civil War veteran, General Oliver Otis Howard, whose close associations to Freedmen's aid societies had earned him the title of "Christian General". The Bureau was largely staffed by ex-union officers who distributed food to needy Blacks and Whites. They supervised the establishment of free labor agriculture and provided needed funding to set up schools for ex-slaves; however, some were suspected of collaborating with planters to enforce repressive regulations, or to ignore the cheating of Blacks. Some southern Whites suspected the Bureau of being part of a conspiracy to undermine relations between Blacks and Whites in the south by agitating Blacks against trusting of Whites, some of which did have the true interests of Blacks at heart. Both freed people and planters, however, turned to the Bureau for help, which the agency did provide regardless of attempts by some individuals to undermine the Bureau's efforts.

The Freedmen's Bureau was created by the American Freedmen's Inquiry Commission, which had been created by the War Department in 1863 to assist and advise emancipated slaves in adjusting. It was created by three life-long abolitionists, Robert Dale Owen, James McKaye and Samuel Gridley, who visited the south and gathered testimony from Blacks and Whites, authoring two joint reports and many accounts of individual observations.

== Andrew Johnson and Jim Crow ==
After taking office, President Andrew Johnson vetoed the re-authorization and funding of the bureau in February 1866 during Reconstruction.

== Freedmen's Town Historic District ==
The Fourth Ward of Houston, Texas is the location of the Freedmen's Town Historic District.

== See also ==
- List of freedmen's towns – Towns established in the United States
- Reconstruction era of the United States – Period after American Civil War (1865–1877)
- Jim Crow laws – Laws enforcing racial segregation in the U.S.
- Block settlement#African American – Type of land distribution to settlers with the same ethnicity

== Sources ==
- Brown, DeNeen L. (2015). "Black towns, established by freed slaves after the Civil War, are dying out". The Washington Post.
- Foner, Eric (2014). Reconstruction - America's Unfinished Revolution 1863–1877 Updated Version. New York: Harper Perennial. ISBN 978-0-06-235451-8.
- Kolchin, Peter (2003). American Slavery: 1619-1877. Macmillan. ISBN 978-0-8090-1630-3.
- McFeely, William S. (1981). Grant: A Biography. Norton. ISBN 0-393-01372-3.
- Sitton, Thad; Conrad, James H. (2005). Freedom Colonies: Independent Black Texans in the Time of Jim Crow. University of Texas Press. ISBN 978-0-2927-0642-2.
- Sitton, Thad (2007). "Freedmen's Settlements". Texas State Historical Association.
