= Free state =

Free state, Free State, or the Free State may refer to:

== Places ==
- Free State (province), a province of South Africa (1994–present)
  - Orange Free State, a former Boer Republic (1854–1902)
  - Orange Free State (province), a former province of South Africa (1910–1994)
- Free State of Prussia, a constituent state of the Weimar Republic
- Free state (polity), a term used in the official titles of some states, including a list of "free states"
- Free state (United States), a U.S. state in which slavery was illegal before the American Civil War
- Maryland, a U.S. state nicknamed the Free State (in abolition and later prohibition contexts)
- Kansas, a U.S state nicknamed the Free State (in the context of slavery)
- Free State of Galveston, a 20th-century whimsical name for Galveston, Texas, U.S.
- Irish Free State (1922–1937), the predecessor of the modern Republic of Ireland

== Other uses ==
- Free State (cricket team), representing Free State, South Africa
- Free State Brewing Company, a microbrewery based in Kansas, U.S.
- Free State Project, an American libertarian political movement
- Freestate Raceway, a former horse racing track in Maryland, U.S.
- Free State Review, an American literary journal
- Lawrence Free State High School, a high school in Lawrence, Kansas, U.S.
- University of the Free State, Bloemfontein, South Africa

== See also ==
- Free city (disambiguation)
- Free Stater (disambiguation)
- Freedom State, 2006 film
- Bound state, in quantum physics
- California Free State, 1996 role-playing game supplement for Shadowrun
- In a Free State, a 1971 novel by V.S. Naipaul
