= Special district (United States) =

Independent special-purpose governmental units, other than school districts

Special districts (also known as special service districts, special district governments, or limited purpose entities) are independent, special-purpose governmental units that exist separately from local governments such as county, municipal, and township governments, with substantial administrative and fiscal independence. They are formed to perform a single function or a set of related functions. The term special district governments as defined by the U.S. Census Bureau excludes school districts. In 2017, the U.S. had more than 51,296 special district governments.

== Census definition ==
The United States Census counts government units across all States. This includes "special districts". To count the special districts the Census must define the special districts so as to address all such governmental entities across the broad spectrum of 50 states' definitions and interpretations. The Census's full definition is:

Special district governments are independent, special purpose governmental units, other than school district governments, that exist as separate entities with substantial administrative and fiscal independence from general purpose local governments. As defined for Census Bureau statistics on governments, the term "special district governments" excludes school district governments as they are defined as a separate governmental type.

Special district governments provide specific services that are not being supplied by existing general purpose governments. Most perform a single function, but in some instances, their enabling legislation allows them to provide several, usually related, types of services. The services provided by these districts range from such basic social needs as hospitals and fire protection, to the less conspicuous tasks of mosquito abatement and upkeep of cemeteries.

The Census Bureau classification of special district governments covers a wide variety of entities, most of which are officially called districts or authorities. Not all public agencies so termed, however, represent separate governments. Many entities that carry the designation "district" or "authority" are, by law, so closely related to county, municipal, town or township, or state governments that they are classified as subordinate agencies of those governments in Census Bureau statistics on governments, and are not counted as separate special district governments.

In order to be classified as a special district government, rather than as a subordinate agency, an entity must possess three attributes—existence as an organized entity, governmental character, and substantial autonomy. Each state description also lists various statutory authorities, commissions, corporations, and other forms of organizations that have certain governmental characteristics, but are subject by law to administrative or fiscal control by the state or by independent local governments; therefore, they are classified as subordinate agencies of those governments.

== Characteristics ==
Special districts serve limited areas and have governing boards that accomplish legislatively assigned functions using public funds.

=== Governing body ===
Each district is governed by a board of directors, commissioners, board of supervisors, or the like. These boards may be appointed by public officials, appointed by private entities, popularly elected, or elected by benefited citizens (typically, property owners). Sometimes, one or more public officials will serve as an ex officio member on the board.

The board of a special district serves primarily as a managing board and often appoints a chief executive for day-to-day operations and decision making and policy implementation. In the New England states, special districts are often run in the same town meeting fashion as other local governments. Most districts have employees, but some districts exist solely to raise funds by issuing bonds and/or by providing tax increment financing.

=== Functions ===
Special districts perform many functions including airports, ports, highways, mass transit, parking facilities, fire protection, libraries, parks, cemeteries, hospitals, irrigation, conservation, sewerage, wastewater treatment, solid waste, fiber optic systems, stadiums, water supply, electric power, and natural gas utility.

== Legal basis ==
Special districts are authorized by state law and must have public foundation, civil office, and public accountability.

=== State law ===
Special districts in the United States are founded by some level of government in accordance with state law (either constitutional amendment, general law, or special acts) and exist in all states. Special districts are legally separate entities with at least some corporate powers. Districts are created by legislative action, court action, or public referendum. The procedures for creating a special district may include procedures such as petitions, hearings, voter or landowner approval, or government approval. Tribal governments may create special districts pursuant to state law and may serve on the boards of special districts.

=== Public foundation ===
Special districts, like all public entities, have public foundation. The landmark case of the U.S. Supreme Court addressing public versus private charters was Dartmouth College v. Woodward in 1819. Dartmouth established the fundamental differences between public and private organizations. Critically, a government must be founded by all of the people of a governmental area or by their governmental representatives.

=== Civil office ===
Special districts possess some form of civil office, that is, the board has received a delegation of sovereign power from the state. Some boards may be appointed by only landowners. Private entities may appoint some or all of the members of a special district; however, there must be evidence of civil office. In addition to special districts with privately appointed boards, a special district may have a privately founded board; however, such a board could not be given the power to set a tax.

=== Accountability ===
There is a citizen-government fiscal accountability relationship. To maintain accountability for special districts, states must maintain ultimate control (the power to repeal the authorizing law at any time). Due to public foundation and, thus, ultimate control, the state can freely delegate sovereign power (such as the power to tax) to special districts and can allow them to act autonomously with little supervision.

== History ==
There is little information available on the earliest special districts in the United States. It is known that park districts existed in the 18th century. Toll road and canal corporations existed in the 19th century. The first general statute authorizing irrigation districts was adopted by California in 1887. The U.S. Census Bureau began identifying and collecting data on special districts in 1942.

=== English custom ===
Special districts in the United States follow the English custom. The earliest known general law in England authorizing special purpose authorities was the Statute of Sewers of 1532. Single purpose authorities created by individual charters also existed at the time. However, the early authorities were temporary and unconnected to local government structure. The first laws authorizing permanent authorities connected to local governments were the Incorporated Guardians of the Poor, which were created by special acts in the 17th century. Turnpike trusts were an early and popular special purpose authority in England. Internal drainage boards are current examples in parts of England and Wales.

== Trends ==
The state of Illinois leads the nation in the number of special districts with California close behind. State counts of their special districts may differ from the federal count because the states may have different definitions of a special district than the U.S. Census Bureau.

== Examples ==
All of the following examples have been found by the U.S. Census Bureau to be special districts. See the Census of Governments Government Organization publications at a depository library or visit https://www.census.gov and select Governments Division.

- Alabama: Alabama Municipal Electric Authority
- Alaska: regional electrical authorities Water district(general law)
- Arizona: Valley Metro Regional Public Transportation Authority
- Arkansas: fire ant abatement districts (general law)
- California: Golden Gate Bridge, Highway and Transportation District
- Colorado: Regional Transportation District, Salida Hospital District
- Connecticut: Pomperaug Valley Water Authority (special act)
- Delaware: tax ditches (general law)
- Florida: Central Florida Tourism Oversight District
- Georgia: Atlanta BeltLine Special Services District
- Hawaiʻi: Central Maui Soil & Water Conservation District
- Idaho: auditorium districts (general law)
- Illinois: Cook Memorial Public Library District
- Indiana: Northwest Indiana Commuter Transportation District
- Iowa: library districts (joint or regional) (general law)
- Kansas: industrial districts (general law)
- Kentucky: Highview Fire Protection District
- Louisiana: West Jefferson Levee District
- Maine: cemetery districts (special acts)
- Maryland: water and sewer authorities (general law)
- Massachusetts: Holyoke Water Works
- Michigan: Huron–Clinton Metroparks
- Minnesota: Minnehaha Creek Watershed District
- Mississippi: lighting districts (special acts)
- Missouri: Jackson County Sports Complex Authority (special act)
- Montana: county rail authorities (general law)
- Nebraska: Omaha Public Power District
- Nevada: Las Vegas–Clark County Library District
- New Hampshire: housing authorities (general law)
- New Jersey: New Jersey Turnpike Authority
- New Mexico: Middle Rio Grande Conservancy District
- New York: Port Washington Parking District
- North Carolina: Research Triangle Regional Public Transit Authority (special act)
- North Dakota: Minot Park District
- Ohio: Northeast Ohio Regional Sewer District
- Oklahoma: public library systems (general law)
- Oregon: Tualatin Hills Park & Recreation District
- Pennsylvania: Philadelphia Regional Port Authority
- Rhode Island: East Providence Special Development District Commission (special act)
- South Carolina: St. John's Fire District
- South Dakota: television translator districts (general law)
- Tennessee: utility districts (general law)
- Texas: Palacios Seawall Commission (special act)
- Utah: Jordan Valley Water Conservancy District
- Vermont: Vermont Public Power Supply Authority (special act)
- Virginia: Buchanan County Tourist Train Development Authority (special act)
- Washington: Independent health districts
- West Virginia: Hatfield-McCoy Regional Recreation Authority
- Wisconsin: Milwaukee Metropolitan Sewerage District
- Wyoming: Baggs Solid Waste Disposal District

=== Conservation districts ===
Conservation districts are local units of government established under state law to carry out natural resource management programs at a local level by providing technical assistance and tools to manage and protect land and water resources in U.S. states and insular areas. There are more than 3,000 in the United States. Depending on the state, they may also be known as soil and water conservation districts, soil conservation districts, resource conservation districts, or other similar names. Nationally and within each state, the districts are generally coordinated by non-governmental associations. District borders often coincide with county borders.

The National Association of Conservation Districts is a non-profit organization that represents America's 3,000 conservation districts, their state and territory associations and the 17,000 men and women who serve. As the national voice for all conservation districts, NACD supports voluntary, incentive-driven natural resources conservation programs that benefit all citizens. NACD's member-driven board of directors selects conservation policy priorities, which are used to develop and review environmental and natural resources legislation and to secure adequate federal funding for natural resources conservation programs.

NACD's mission is to promote the wise and responsible use of natural resources for all lands by providing a unified, national voice for locally led conservation districts and their associations through grassroots advocacy, education and partnerships.

== See also ==
- District
- Joint powers authority
- Local government in the United States
- Public-benefit nonprofit corporation
