= Home rule in the United States =

Form of local government

Home Rule in the United States (municipalities). Home rule, no Dillon's Rule Home rule and Dillon's Rule Limited home rule, no Dillon's Rule Limited home rule, Dillon's Rule No home rule, Dillon's Rule

Home rule in the United States relates to the authority of a constituent part of a U.S. state to exercise powers of governance (i.e., whether such powers must be specifically delegated to it by the state – typically by legislative action – or are generally implicitly allowed unless specifically denied by state-level action). Forty of the fifty states apply some form of the principle known as Dillon's Rule, which says that local governments may exercise only powers that the state specifically grants to them, to determine the bounds of a municipal government's legal authority.

In some states, known as home rule states, the state's constitution grants municipalities and/or counties the ability to pass various types of laws to govern themselves (so long as the laws do not conflict with the state and federal constitutions). In other states, known as Dillon's Rule states, only limited authority has been granted to local governments by passage of statutes in the state legislature. In these states, a city or county must obtain permission from the state legislature if it wishes to pass a law or ordinance not specifically permitted under existing state legislation. Most states have a mix; for example, allowing home rule for municipalities with a minimum number of residents.

The National League of Cities identifies 31 Dillon's Rule states, 10 home rule states, 8 states that apply Dillon's Rule only to certain municipalities, and one state (Florida) that applies home rule to everything except taxation. Each state defines for itself what powers it will grant to local governments. Within the local sphere, there are four categories in which the state may allow discretionary authority:

- Structural – power to choose the form of government, charter and enact charter revisions,
- Functional – power to exercise local self government in a broad or limited manner,
- Fiscal – authority to determine revenue sources, set tax rates, borrow funds and other related financial activities,
- Personnel – authority to set employment rules, remuneration rates, employment conditions and collective bargaining.

Many states have different provisions regarding home rule for counties than for municipalities. The National Association of Counties says in 14 states all counties (or county equivalents) operate under Dillon's Rule, while 13 states allow all counties home rule authority and 21 states have a mix of home rule and Dillon's Rule. Connecticut and Rhode Island do not have independent county governments.

== Home rule and Dillon's Rule states ==
The following chart indicates which of the 50 U.S. states are home rule states and which states obey the legal principle of Dillon's Rule for determining local government authority. A state in this chart with "Limited" home rule may grant home rule to particular cities and municipalities individually but has no constitutional provision guaranteeing home rule. A state that is both a home rule state and a Dillon's Rule state applies Dillon's Rule to matters or governmental units not accounted for in the constitutional provision or statute that grants home rule.

Washington, D.C., is a federal city with a limited form of home rule granted by the federal government; see District of Columbia home rule for details.

State	Home rule state?	Dillon's Rule state?	Comments
Alabama	Limited	Yes	Limited home rule granted to cities and towns in Article XII, Sections 220-28, of the Alabama constitution. Counties are not delegated even a general grant of power under Dillon's Rule and must seek "local legislation" from the state legislature.
Alaska	Yes	No	
Arizona	Yes	Yes	
Arkansas	Limited	Yes	
California	Yes	Yes	Cities that have not adopted a charter are organized by state law. Such a city is called a "general law city" (or a "code city"), which will be managed by a five-member city council. As of January 21, 2020, 125 of California's 478 cities were charter cities.
Colorado	Yes	Yes	Home rule provided for municipalities by constitutional amendment in 1902; for counties in 1970 (more limited than for municipalities). 102 home rule municipalities, plus two consolidated city-counties that are home rule, and two home rule counties.
Connecticut	Yes	Yes	
Delaware	No	Yes	
Florida	Yes	No	Home rule specifically granted in Section 166.021(1) of Florida Statutes.
Georgia	Yes	Yes	Home rule specifically granted in Article IX of Georgia Constitution
Hawaii	Yes	Yes	
Idaho	Yes	Yes	
Illinois	Yes	Yes	
Indiana	Limited	Yes	Dillon's Rule applies only to townships.
Iowa	Yes	No	
Kansas	Limited	Yes	Dillon's Rule does not apply to cities or counties.
Kentucky	Limited	Yes	
Louisiana	Yes	Yes	Home rule is more limited in charter municipalities established after 1974.
Maine	Yes	Yes	
Maryland	Yes	Yes	
Massachusetts	Yes	No	
Michigan	Yes	Yes	Home rule applies to all cities, some villages, and two counties. Cities may be chartered with home rule status pursuant to the Home Rule City Act. Dillon's rule applies to all townships.
Minnesota	Yes	Yes	
Mississippi	No	Yes	
Missouri	Yes	Yes	
Montana	No	Yes	
Nebraska	Limited	Yes	The Nebraska Constitution was amended in 1912 to allow cities with a population of more than 5,000 inhabitants to form a government under home rule. See Article XI, Section 2 Lincoln and Omaha are Nebraska's only home rule cities as of 2020. Grand Island adopted a home rule charter in 1928; it was repealed by the voters on April 2, 1963. The city council subsequently repealed the charter on April 17, 1963, with Ordinance 3990.
Nevada	No	Yes	"Functional home rule" granted to counties by SB29 (2015). However, local government including general improvement districts, special districts, fire districts, and school districts were not affected by this change as they are independent of county government.
New Hampshire	No	Yes	
New Jersey	Yes	No	
New Mexico	Yes	Yes	
New York	Yes	Yes	
North Carolina	Limited	Yes	
North Dakota	Yes	Yes	
Ohio	Yes	No	State government and municipal corporations (incorporated villages and cities) are allowed home rule.<https://codes.ohio.gov/ohio-revised-code/section-715.03> Townships can elect to become "home rule" by voter approval or if the population is large enough the trustees can pass a resolution, can be overridden by voters. <https://codes.ohio.gov/ohio-revised-code/section-504.01> Counties may adopt an alternative form of county government allowing for home rule, must be voter approved.<https://codes.ohio.gov/ohio-revised-code/section-302.13>
Oklahoma	No	Yes	
Oregon	Yes	No	
Pennsylvania	Yes	Yes	
Rhode Island	Yes	Yes	
South Carolina	Limited	No	
South Dakota	Yes	Yes	
Tennessee	Yes	Yes	
Texas	Limited	Yes	Cities may adopt home rule once their population exceeds 5,000 and the voters adopt a city charter, the provisions of which cannot be inconsistent with either the Texas Constitution or "the general laws of the state." If the population subsequently falls below 5,000, the charter remains in force and may be amended. Otherwise, cities with populations of 5,000 or less are governed by the general laws only. School districts are generally governed by the general laws; a district may adopt a home rule charter, but no district has chosen to do so. Counties and "special districts" (other special-purpose governmental entities besides cities and school districts) are governed solely by the general laws and prohibited from adopting home rule.
Utah	Limited	No	
Vermont	No	Yes	
Virginia	No	Yes	All cities, which must have at least 5,000 residents and are independent from counties, and towns, which are not, are required to have a charter, although Dillon's Rule applies. See administrative divisions of Virginia.
Washington	Yes	Yes	
West Virginia	Yes	No	Dillon's Rule was effectively abolished in the 1969 Municipal Code, §7, Article 1. Home rule was introduced in a pilot program in 2007 and made permanent in 2019.
Wisconsin	Limited	Yes	
Wyoming	No	Yes	

== Home rule charter cities ==
In the United States, a home rule city, charter city, or home rule charter city is a city in which the governing system is defined by its own municipal charter document rather than solely by state statute (general law). State law may require general-law cities to have a five-member city council, for example, as in California, but a city organized under a charter may choose a different system, including the "strong mayor" or "city manager" forms of government. These cities may be administered predominantly by residents or through a third-party management structure, because a charter gives a city the flexibility to choose novel types of government structure. Depending on the state, all cities, no cities, or some cities may be charter cities.

== See also ==
- Charter city (economic development)
- City-state
- Devolution
- Free imperial city
- General-law municipality
- Independent city (United States)
- Local government in the United States
- Municipal corporation
