= David Daniel (poet) =

American poet, editor, literary critic, academic

- Born: August 20, 1960 (age 66); Danville, Kentucky, U.S.
- Education: Vanderbilt University (B.A., 1982); Johns Hopkins University (M.A., 1983); University of Virginia (M.F.A., 1986)
- Occupation: Poet
- Writing career
- Period: 1986–present
- Genre: Poetry
- Notable work: Ornaments (2017)

David Michael Daniel (born August 20, 1960) is an American poet. He is best known for four full-length volumes of his poetry: Seven-Star Bird, Ornaments, What Love Is When the World Is in Want, and What Love Is. Daniel is the creator and producer of WAMFEST: The Words and Music Festival which he founded in 2007. He is a professor of creative writing at Fairleigh Dickinson University where the festival is held.

== Early life and education ==
Daniel was born in Danville, Kentucky, on August 20, 1960, and lived in Louisiana and North Carolina before his family settled in Murfreesboro, Tennessee, when he was 10 years old. Daniel earned a Bachelor of Arts degree from Vanderbilt University with a double major in English and philosophy in 1982. The following year, he received a Master of Arts degree from Johns Hopkins University in their Writing Seminars program. Then in 1986, he earned a Master of Fine Arts degree in creative writing from the University of Virginia, where he was a Henry Hoynes Fellow.

== Ploughshares and other literary journals ==
In 1987, Daniel became the editor of AWP Chronicle (now known as The Writer’s Chronicle). The following year after moving to Cambridge, Massachusetts, he became the associate editor of the Harvard Book Review and around the same time, joined the editorial staff of Ploughshares. He became the poetry editor for the latter literary journal in 1992, a post he held for 15 years. In 2007, he became the co-poetry editor of The Literary Review, as well as a member of its board of directors, positions he held until 2012.

== Published works ==
Daniel's poems have been published in numerous magazines and literary journals, most notably in American Poetry Review, The Literary Review, The Antioch Review, Poetry East and AGNI. His essay, “Thoughts on ‘Me and Bobby McGee’ and the Oral and Literary Traditions,” was published in The Poetics of American Song Lyrics, edited by Charlotte Pence. Another of his essays, “Discovering the Prose Poem in Norfolk, Virginia,” was included in The Rose Metal Press Field Guide to Prose Poetry: Contemporary Poets in Discussion and Practice, edited by Gary L. McDowell and F. Daniel Rzicznek. Daniel also has had a large number of poetry and book reviews published, most notably in Ploughshares, Harvard Book Review and The Journal of Country Music. In June 2026, Vox Populi published Daniel’s poem “My Tumbleweed.”

=== The Quick and the Dead ===
The Quick and the Dead, a chapbook of Daniel's poetry was published by Haw River Press in 1992.

=== Seven-Star Bird ===
Daniel's first full-length poetry collection, Seven-Star Bird, was published by Graywolf Press in 2003. In 2004, the book was awarded the Larry Levis Reading Prize. One of the most prestigious awards of its kind, it is given to the best first or second book of poems published in the year.

After reading Seven-Star Bird, legendary literary critic Harold Bloom called Daniel “an authentic heir of Hart Crane” and included a lengthy excerpt from the book in the 2006 anthology he edited, The Library of America: Anthology of American Religious Poetry. Poet Tom Sleigh also referenced Crane in regards to the book, writing, “Like Hart Crane in ‘The Bridge’, David Daniel has a vision of desire that is transcendental, but also social, that links erotic and domestic love with love of the divine.”

=== Ornaments ===
Daniel's second full-length book of poetry, Ornaments, was published by the University of Pittsburgh Press in 2017 as part of the highly regarded Pitt Poetry Series. In a review of the book published in Pratik, writer and critic Barrett Warner wrote, “With these poems in Ornaments, Daniel has perfected his natural gifts. He seamlessly enters any century and any sound and any love without its feeling overblown. Daniel doesn’t suspend our disbelief, he engages and embraces it.”

=== What Love Is When the World Is in Want ===
Daniel’s third full-length collection of poems What Love Is When the World Is in Want was published in March 2025 by Nirala Publications. In a review of the book for MicroLit, Gail Hosking wrote, “Creatures announce the arrival of his son with indirect communication, implying not only the circle of life, but the connection of us all to everything. He explores our wild heart’s places, coyotes he speaks with, first loves, and the mystery and mystical with an upside down bluejay caught in his bird feeder. He spends time with ‘the night the barred owl visited perched on a branch above our porch.’ I am in love with his line about that owl, who ‘…looked at us/ for a long time, long enough for us to know/ most everything we need to know.’ It gives me an almost spiritual chill every time I read it.”

=== What Love Is ===
In March of 2026, Galileo Press published What Love Is, which features nine illuminated poems with graphic-novel-style artwork by George Cochrane and commentary from both Daniel and Cochrane. Kirkus Reviews wrote, "Author Daniel and artist Cochrane present a poetry-filled work of graphic literature that illuminates love in moments of beauty, awkwardness, and tragedy...A strong poetic work that honors the comic-book form.”

== Teaching and Union Activity ==
In 1989, Daniel joined the faculty of Emerson College in Boston as an adjunct professor in the Department of Writing, Literature and Publishing, a position he held until 2004. During his time at Emerson, Daniel co-founded and was the first president of the part-time faculty union, the Affiliated Faculty of Emerson College. Part-time faculty made up 75 percent of the school's faculty at the time, and the AFEC was the first independent part-time faculty union in the East. Daniel led the AFEC negotiating team which produced the union's first contract with the school administration in 2004. In 2005, Daniel became a professor and the director of the undergraduate Creative Writing program at Fairleigh Dickinson University, where he is also on the faculty of the school's low residency creative writing MFA. From 2012 to 2016, Daniel was a member of the core faculty of Bennington College’s Writing Seminars MFA program.

== Honors, Awards and Professional Service ==
In 2004, Daniel received the Larry Levis Reading Prize, an award given to the best first or second book of poems published in the year, for his book Seven-Star Bird.

Daniel was a featured poet at the Geraldine R. Dodge Poetry Festival in 2014.

That same year he was the recipient of the Massachusetts Cultural Council Artist Fellowship in Poetry.

Also in 2014, Daniel became a member of the Cambridge Arts Council's advisory board, a position he still holds.
