= County =

Geographical and administrative region in some countries

A county is a type of officially recognized geographical division within a state, both federal and sovereign, or province. Counties are defined in diverse ways, but they are typically current or former official administrative divisions within systems of local government, and in this sense, counties are similar to shires, and typically larger than municipalities. Various non-English terms can be translated as "county" or "shire" in other languages, and in English new terms with less historical connection have been invented such as "council area" and "local government district". On the other hand, in older English-speaking countries the word can still refer to traditional historical regions such as some of those which exist in England, Scotland, Wales, and Ireland. The term is also sometimes used for districts with specific non-governmental purposes such as courts, or land registration.

Historically, the concept of a geographical administrative "county" is European (from French: comté, Latin: comitatus), and represented the territorial limits of the jurisdiction of a medieval count, or a viscount (French: vîcomte, Latin: vicecomes) supposedly standing in the place of a count. However, there were no such counts in medieval England, and when the French-speaking Normans took control of England after 1066 they transplanted the French and medieval Latin terms to describe the pre-existing Anglo Saxon shires, even though they did not establish any system placing the administration of shires under the control of high-level nobles. Instead, although there were exceptions, the officers responsible for administrative functions, such as tax collection, or the mustering of soldiers, were sheriffs, theoretically assigned by the central government, and controlled by the monarch.

The counties of England have evolved in several different directions, so that there is now more than one definition. The 39 "traditional", "ancient" or "historic" counties of England have on the one hand evolved into 83 metropolitan and non-metropolitan counties, which are modern administrative districts covering the whole country except London, Berkshire, and the Isles of Scilly. The historic counties are also the basis for the 48 ceremonial counties of England, which still each have lords-lieutenants and high sheriffs, who theoretically represent the monarchy in different parts of the country. In cases such as Yorkshire and Sussex, some historical counties remain as geographical regions without any administrative function. The postal counties of the United Kingdom, based upon older county definitions, were used by the Royal Mail until 1996. Scotland replaced its 34 historic counties or shires with 32 modern "council areas", some of which correspond to the old counties, or use the old names. In Wales the modern "principal areas" correspond to some extent to the old county boundaries, and they can also still be referred to as "counties" and "county boroughs". The 32 modern Irish counties were first defined after the Norman invasion, but several of these were broadly continuations with earlier divisions such as clan territories (Tír Eoghain became county Tyrone, Tír Chonaill became county Donegal, west Breifne became county Leitrim and Fír Manach became modern county Fermanagh).

Notable examples of more recently founded English-speaking administrations which have taken up the term "county" as a level of local government include the United States and Canada, where counties sometimes evolved from historic districts governed by courts or magistrates, before the countries became independent of the United Kingdom. In New Zealand, there were counties historically, but these have been replaced by cities or districts. In Australian local government, the term "shire" is among the several which are typically used in local government, depending upon the state, but the term "county", which was used by the colonial administration, is mainly relevant for land registration districts (for example in Queensland lands administration). It is also used for the County Court of Victoria, which is a court covering an entire Australian state.

== Africa ==
=== Kenya ===
Counties are the current second-level political division in Kenya. Each county has an assembly where members of the county assembly (MCAs) sit. This assembly is headed by a governor. Each county is also represented in the Senate of Kenya by a senator. Additionally, a women's representative is elected from each county to the Parliament of Kenya to represent women's interests. Counties replaced provinces as the second-level division after the promulgation of the 2010 Constitution of Kenya.

=== Liberia ===
Liberia has 15 counties, each of which elects two senators to the Senate of Liberia.

== Asia ==
=== China ===
The English word county is used to translate the Chinese term xiàn (县 or 縣). In Mainland China, governed by the People's Republic of China (PRC), counties and county-level divisions are the third level of regional/local government, coming under the provincial level and the prefectural level, and above the township level and village level.

There are 1,464 so-named "counties" out of 2,862 county-level divisions in the PRC, and the number of counties has remained more or less constant since the Han dynasty (206 BC – AD 220). It remains one of the oldest titles of local-level government in China and significantly predates the establishment of provinces in the Yuan dynasty (1279–1368). The county government was particularly important in imperial China because this was the lowest level at which the imperial government is functionally involved, while below it the local people are managed predominantly by the gentries. The head of a county government during imperial China was the magistrate, who was often a newly ascended jinshi.

In older context, district was an older English translation of xiàn before the establishment of the Republic of China (ROC). The English nomenclature county was adopted following the establishment of the ROC.

During most of the imperial era, there were no concepts like municipalities in China. All cities existed within counties, commanderies, prefectures, etc., and had no governments of their own. (Note: There were exceptions in the Jīn and Yuan dynasties, when cities were separated from counties and independently administered by institutions like 録事司 (lù shi sī) and 司候司 (sī hòu sī).) Large cities (must be imperial capitals or seats of prefectures) could be divided and administered by two or three counties. Such counties are called 倚郭縣 (yǐguō xiàn, 'county leaning on the city walls') or 附郭縣 (fùguō xiàn, 'county attached to the city walls'). The yamen or governmental houses of these counties exist in the same city. In other words, they share one county town. In this sense, a yǐguō xiàn or fùguō xiàn is similar to a district of a city.

For example, the city of Guangzhou (seat of the eponymous prefecture, also known as Canton in the Western world) was historically divided by Nanhai County (南海縣) and Panyu County (番禺縣). When the first modern city government in China was established in Guangzhou, the urban area was separated from these two counties, with the rural areas left in the remaining parts of them. However, the county governments remained in the city for years, before moving into the respective counties. Similar processes happened in many Chinese cities.

Nowadays, most counties in mainland China, i.e., with "Xian" in their titles, are administered by prefecture-level cities and have mainly agricultural economies and rural populations.

=== Indonesia ===
Regency (kabupaten) in Indonesia is an administrative unit under a province that is equivalent to a city. A regency is headed by a regent who is directly elected by the people, and is responsible for public services such as education, health, and infrastructure. The structure of a regency includes several districts (kecamatan) which are further divided into villages or ward. Regency in Indonesia is similar to the concept of "county" in countries such as the United States and the United Kingdom, but with differences in cultural context and government system. Indonesia has more than 400 regencies spread across all provinces.

=== Iran ===
Counties of Iran

The ostans (provinces) of Iran are further subdivided into counties called shahrestān (Persian: شهرستان). County consists of a city centre, a few bakhsh (Persian: بخش), and many villages around them. There are usually a few cities (Persian: شهر, shahar) and rural agglomerations (Persian: دهستان, dehestān) in each county. Rural agglomerations are a collection of a number of villages. One of the cities of the county is appointed as the capital of the county.

Each shahrestān has a government office known as farmândâri (فرمانداری), which coordinates different events and government offices. The farmândâr فرماندار, or the head of farmândâri, is the governor of the shahrestān.

Fars province has the highest number of shahrestāns, with 36, while Qom uniquely has one, being coextensive with its namesake county. Iran had 324 shahrestāns in 2005 and 443 in 2021.

=== Korea ===
County is the common English translation for the character 군 (gun or kun) that denotes the current second level political division in South Korea. In North Korea, the county is one type of municipal-level division.

=== Taiwan ===
There are currently 13 counties in the Republic of China (Taiwan). In addition, provincial cities have the same level of authority as counties. Above county, there are special municipalities (in effect) and province (suspended due to economical and political reasons).

== Europe ==
=== Denmark ===
Denmark was divided into counties (Danish: amter) from 1662 to 2006. On 1 January 2007 the counties were replaced by five Regions. At the same time, the number of municipalities was slashed to 98.

The counties were first introduced in 1662, replacing the 49 fiefs (len) in Denmark–Norway with the same number of counties. This number does not include the subdivisions of the Duchy of Schleswig, which was only under partial Danish control. The number of counties in Denmark (excluding Norway) had dropped to around 20 by 1793. Following the reunification of South Jutland with Denmark in 1920, four counties replaced the Prussian Kreise. Aabenraa and Sønderborg County merged in 1932 and Skanderborg and Aarhus were separated in 1942. From 1942 to 1970, the number stayed at 22. The number was further decreased by the 1970 Danish municipal reform, leaving 14 counties plus two cities unconnected to the county structure; Copenhagen and Frederiksberg.

In 2003, Bornholm County merged with the local five municipalities, forming the Bornholm Regional Municipality. The remaining 13 counties were abolished on 1 January 2007 where they were replaced by five new regions. In the same reform, the number of municipalities was slashed from 270 to 98 and all municipalities now belong to a region.

=== France ===
Departments of France

A comté was a territory ruled by a count (comte) in medieval France. In modern France, the rough equivalent of a county as used in many English-speaking countries is a department (département). Ninety-six departments are in metropolitan France, and five are overseas departments, which are also classified as overseas regions. Departments are further subdivided into 334 arrondissements, but these have no autonomy; they are the basis of local organisation of police, fire departments and, sometimes, administration of elections.

=== Germany ===
German districts, and district-free cities (yellow) as of 2026

Each administrative district consists of an elected council and an executive, and whose duties are comparable to those of a county executive in the United States, supervising local government administration. Historically, counties in the Holy Roman Empire were called Grafschaften. The majority of German districts are "rural districts" (German: Landkreise), of which there are 294 as of 2017. Cities with more than 100,000 inhabitants (and smaller towns in some states) do not usually belong to a district, but take on district responsibilities themselves, similar to the concept of independent cities and there are 107 of them, bringing the total number of districts to 401.

=== Hungary ===
The administrative unit of Hungary is called megye (before 1950 and between 2022 and 2026 they were called vármegye and historically also comitatus in Latin), which can be translated with the word county. Megye is also used in Hungarian to refer to counties of other states, also the word appeared even in legal texts as a shorter/colloquial form before 1950 too. The 19 counties constitute the highest level of the administrative subdivisions of the country together with the capital city Budapest, although counties and the capital are grouped into seven statistical regions.

Counties are subdivided into districts (járás) and municipalities, the two types of which are towns (város) and villages (község meaning commune, some larger villages are styled nagyközség or large commune, but they have the same legal standing), each one having their own elected mayor and council. 23 of the towns have the rights of a county although they do not form independent territorial units equal to counties.

The vármegye was the historic administrative unit in the Kingdom of Hungary, which included areas of present-day neighbouring countries of Hungary. Its Latin name (comitatus) is the equivalent of the French comté. Actual political and administrative role of counties changed much through history. Originally they were subdivisions of the royal administration, but from the 13th century they became self-governments of the nobles and kept this character until the 19th century when in turn they became modern local governments.

=== Ireland ===
Ireland, showing traditional provinces and counties as well as the modern administrative districts on both sides of the international border

The island of Ireland was historically divided into 32 counties, of which 26 later formed the Republic of Ireland and 6 made up Northern Ireland.

These counties are traditionally grouped into four provinces: Leinster (12 counties), Munster (6), Connacht (5) and Ulster (9). Historically, the counties of Meath and Westmeath and small parts of surrounding counties constituted the province of Mide, which was one of the "Five Fifths" of Ireland (in the Irish language the word for province, cúige, means 'a fifth': from cúig, 'five'); however, these have long since been absorbed into Leinster. In the Republic each county is administered by an elected "county council", and the old provincial divisions are merely traditional names with no political significance.

The number and boundaries of administrative counties in the Republic of Ireland were reformed in the 1990s. For example, County Dublin was divided into three: Dún Laoghaire–Rathdown, Fingal, and South Dublin; the City of Dublin had existed for centuries before. The cities of Cork and Galway have been separated from the town and rural areas of their counties. The cities of Limerick and Waterford were merged with their respective counties in 2014. Thus, the Republic of Ireland now has 31 'county-level' authorities, although the borders of the original twenty-six counties are still officially in place.

In Northern Ireland, the six county councils and the smaller town councils were abolished in 1973 and replaced by a single tier of local government. However, in the north as well as in the south, the traditional 32 counties and 4 provinces remain in common usage for many sporting, cultural and other purposes. County identity is heavily reinforced in the local culture by allegiances to county teams in hurling and Gaelic football. Each Gaelic Athletic Association county has its own flag/colours (and often a nickname), and county allegiances are taken quite seriously. See the counties of Ireland and the Gaelic Athletic Association.

=== Italy ===
In Italy the word county is not used; the administrative sub-division of a region is called provincia. Italian provinces are mainly named after their principal town and comprise several administrative subdivisions called comuni ('communes'). There are currently 110 provinces in Italy.

In the context of pre-modern Italy, the Italian word contado generally refers to the countryside surrounding, and controlled by, the city state. The contado provided natural resources and agricultural products to sustain the urban population. In contemporary usage, contado can refer to a metropolitan area, and in some cases large rural/suburban regions providing resources to distant cities.

=== Lithuania ===
Apskritis (plural apskritys) is the Lithuanian word for county. Since 1994 Lithuania has 10 counties; before 1950 it had 20. The only purpose with the county is an office of a state governor who shall conduct law and order in the county.

=== Norway ===
Norway has been divided into 11 counties (Bokmål: fylker, Nynorsk: fylke; singular: fylke) since 2020; they previously numbered 19 following a local government reform in 1972. Until that year Bergen was a separate county, but today it is a municipality within the county of Vestland. All counties form administrative entities called county municipalities (fylkeskommuner or fylkeskommunar; singular: fylkeskommune), further subdivided into municipalities (kommuner or kommunar; singular: kommune). One county, Oslo, is not divided into municipalities, rather it is equivalent to the municipality of Oslo.

Each county has its own county council (fylkesting) whose representatives are elected every four years together with representatives to the municipal councils. The counties handle matters such as high schools and local roads, and until 1 January 2002 hospitals as well. This last responsibility was transferred to the state-run health authorities and health trusts, and there is a debate on the future of the county municipality as an administrative entity. Some people, and parties, such as the Conservative and Progress Party, call for the abolition of the county municipalities once and for all, while others, including the Labour Party, merely want to merge some of them into larger regions.

=== Poland ===
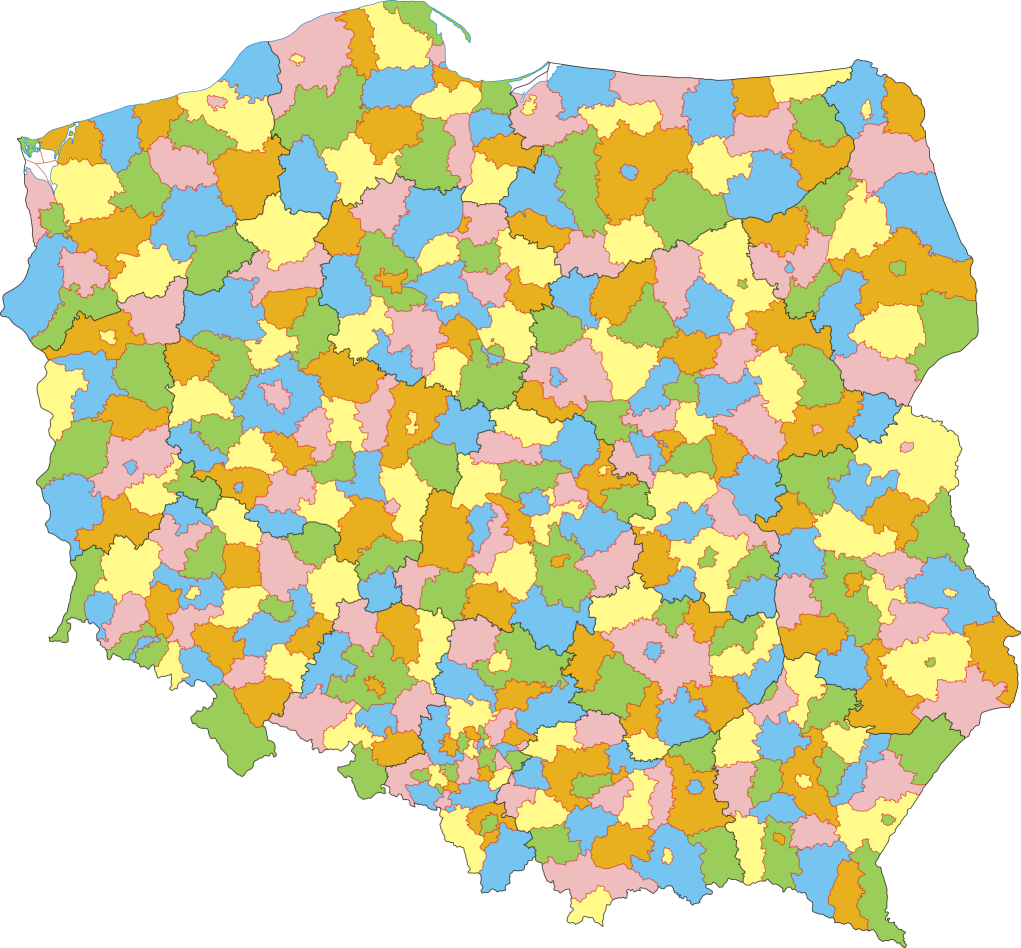
Powiaty in Poland

The territorial administration of Poland since 1999 has been based on three levels of subdivision. The country is divided into voivodeships (provinces); these are further divided into powiats. The term powiat is often translated into English as county (or sometimes district). In historical contexts this may be confusing because the Polish term hrabstwo (a territorial unit administered/owned by a hrabia, count) is also literally translated as "county" and it was subordinated under powiat.

The 380 county-level entities in Poland include 314 "land counties" (powiaty ziemskie) and the 66 "city counties" (miasta na prawach powiatu or powiaty grodzkie) powiat. They are subdivisions of the 16 voivodeship, and are further subdivided into 2,479 gminas (also called commune or municipality).

=== Romania ===
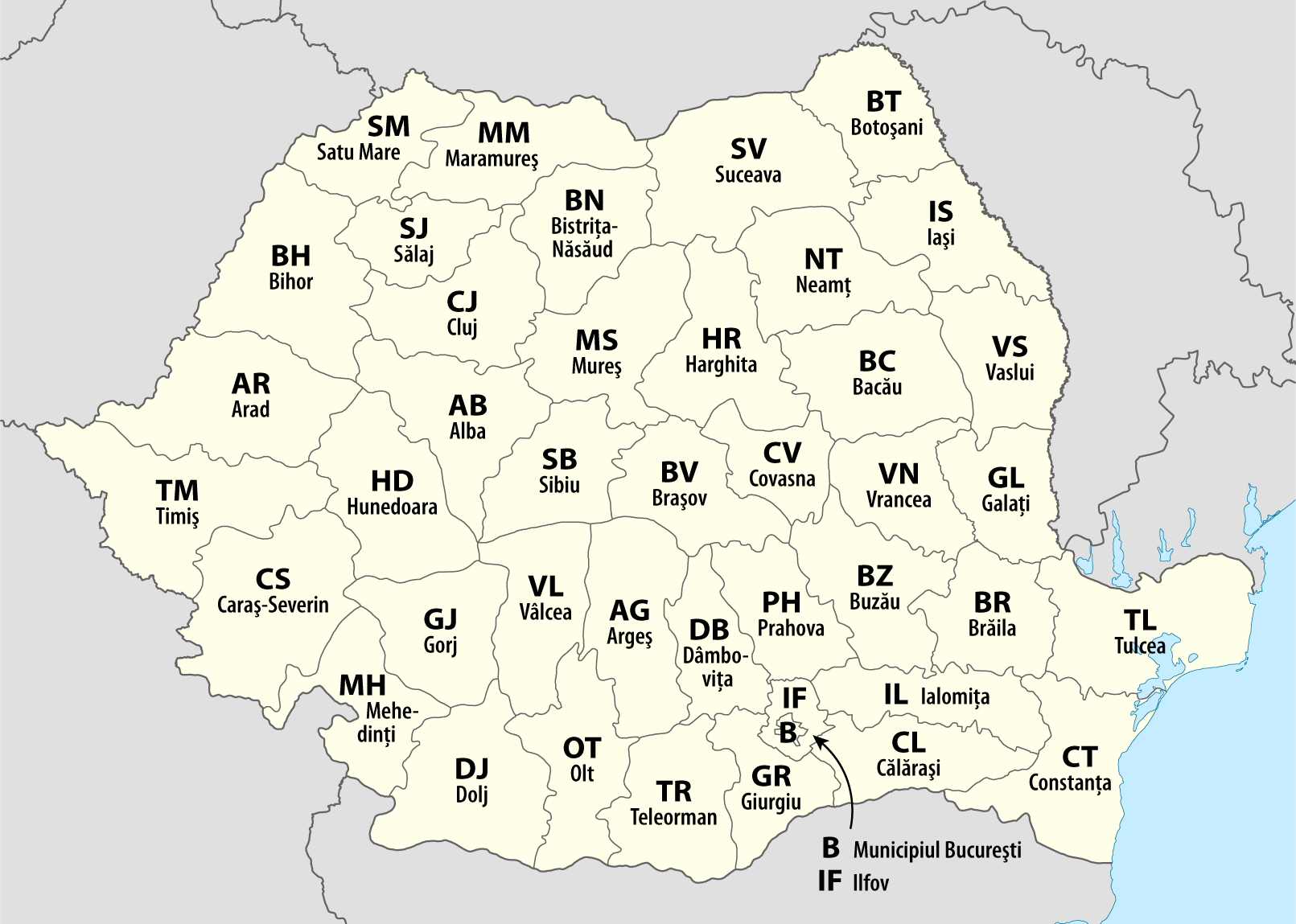
Județe of Romania

The Romanian word for county, comitat, is not currently used for any Romanian administrative divisions. Romania is divided into a total of 41 counties (Romanian: județe), which along with the municipality of Bucharest, constitute the official administrative divisions of Romania. They represent the country's NUTS-3 (Nomenclature of Territorial Units for Statistics – Level 3) statistical subdivisions within the European Union and each of them serves as the local level of government within its borders. Most counties are named after a major river, while some are named after notable cities within them, such as the county seat.

=== Sweden ===
Sweden's counties since 1998.

The Swedish division into counties, län, which literally means 'fief', was established in 1634, and was based on an earlier division into provinces; Sweden is divided into 21 counties and 290 municipalities (kommuner). At the county level there is a county administrative board led by a governor appointed by the central government of Sweden, as well as an elected county council that handles a separate set of issues, notably hospitals and public transportation for the municipalities within its borders. The counties and their expanse have changed several times, most recently in 1998.

Every county council corresponds to a county with a number of municipalities per county. County councils and municipalities have different roles and separate responsibilities relating to local government. Health care, public transport and certain cultural institutions are administered by county councils while general education, public water utilities, garbage disposal, elderly care and rescue services are administered by the municipalities. Gotland is a special case of being a county council with only one municipality and the functions of county council and municipality are performed by the same organisation.

=== Ukraine ===
In Ukraine, the county (Ukrainian: повіт, romanized: povit) was introduced in Ukrainian territories under Poland in the second half of the 14th century, and in the eighteenth century under the Russian Empire in the Cossack Hetmanate, Sloboda Ukraine, Southern Ukraine, and Right-Bank Ukraine. In 1913 there were 126 counties in Ukrainian-inhabited territories of the Russian Empire. Under the Austrian Empire in 1914 there were 59 counties in Ukrainian-inhabited Galicia, 34 in Transcarpathia, and 10 in Bukovina. Counties were retained by the independent Ukrainian People's Republic of 1917–1921, and in Czechoslovakia, Poland, and Romania until the Soviet annexations at the start of World War II. 99 counties formed the Ukrainian SSR in 1919, where they were abolished in 1923–25 in favour of 53 okruhas (in turn replaced by oblasts in 1930–32), although they existed in the Zakarpattia Oblast until 1953.

=== United Kingdom ===
The United Kingdom is divided into a number of metropolitan and non-metropolitan counties. There are also ceremonial counties which group small non-metropolitan counties into geographical areas broadly based on the historic counties of England. In 1974, the metropolitan and non-metropolitan counties replaced the system of administrative counties and county boroughs which was introduced in 1889. The counties generally belong to level 3 of the Nomenclature of Territorial Units for Statistics (NUTS 3).

In 1965 and 1974–1975, major reorganisations of local government in England and Wales created several new administrative counties such as Hereford and Worcester (abolished again in 1998 and reverted, with some transfers of territory, to the two separate historic counties of Herefordshire and Worcestershire) and also created several new metropolitan counties based on large urban areas as a single administrative unit. In Scotland, county-level local government was replaced by larger regions, which lasted until 1996. Modern local government in Scotland, Wales, Northern Ireland and a large part of England is trending towards smaller unitary authorities: a system similar to that proposed in the 1960s by the Redcliffe-Maud Report for most of Britain.

The name "county" was introduced by the Normans, and was derived from a Norman term for an area administered by a Count (lord). These Norman "counties" were simply the Saxon shires, and kept their Saxon names. Several traditional counties, including Essex, Sussex and Kent, predate the unification of England by Alfred the Great, and were originally more or less independent kingdoms (although the most important Saxon Kingdom on the island of Britain, Alfred's own Wessex, no longer survives in any form).

==== England ====
Ceremonial counties of England

In England, in the Anglo-Saxon period, shires were established as areas used for the raising of taxes, and usually had a fortified town at their centre. This became known as the shire town or later the county town. In many cases, the shires were named after their shire town (for example Bedfordshire), but there are several exceptions, such as Cumberland, Norfolk and Suffolk. In several other cases, such as Buckinghamshire, the modern county town is different from the town after which the shire is named. (See Toponymical list of counties of the United Kingdom)

Most non-metropolitan counties in England are run by county councils and are divided into non-metropolitan districts, each with its own council. Local authorities in the UK are usually responsible for education, emergency services, planning, transport, social services, and a number of other functions.

Until 1974, the county boundaries of England changed little over time. In the medieval period, a number of important cities were granted the status of counties in their own right, such as London, Bristol and Coventry, and numerous small exclaves such as Islandshire were created. In 1844, most of these exclaves were transferred to their surrounding counties.

==== Northern Ireland ====
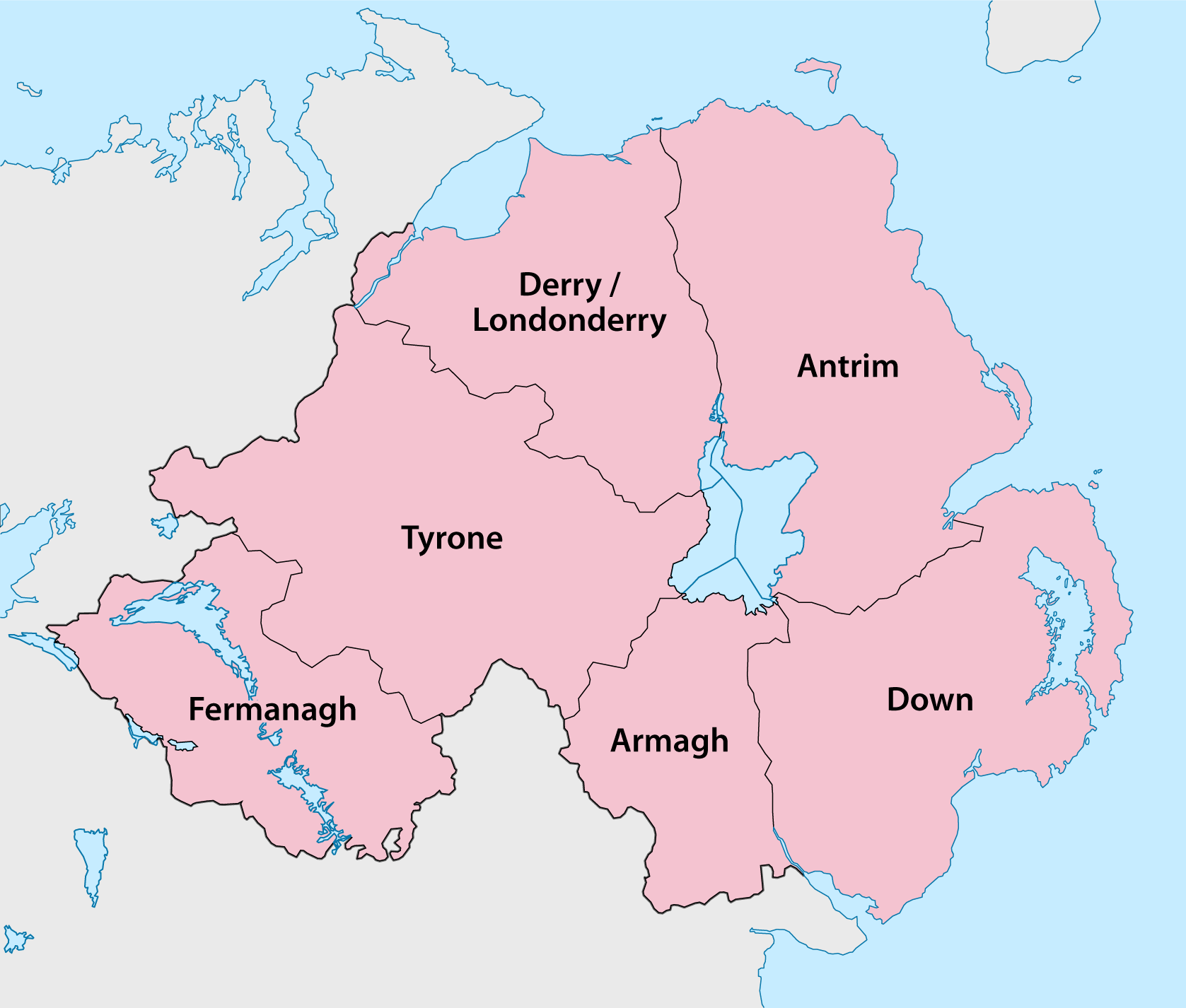
Counties of Northern Ireland

In Northern Ireland, the six county councils, if not their counties, were abolished in 1973 and replaced by 26 local government districts. The traditional six counties remain in common everyday use for many cultural and other purposes.

==== Scotland and Wales ====
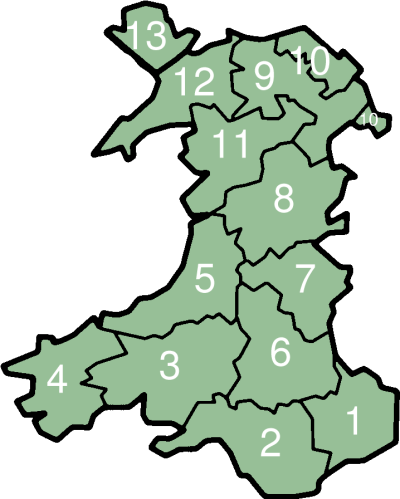
Historic counties of Wales

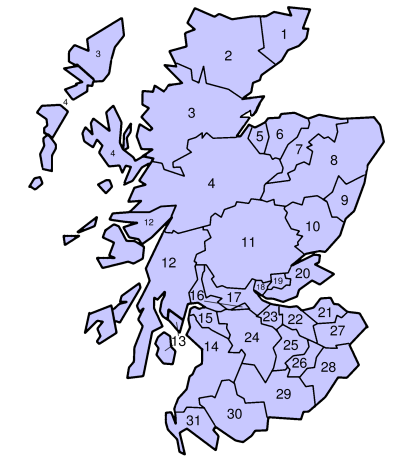
Counties in Scotland at the time of their 1975 abolishment

The thirteen historic counties of Wales were fixed by statute in 1539 (although counties such as Pembrokeshire date from 1138) and most of the shires of Scotland are of at least this age. The Welsh word for county is sir which is derived from the English 'shire'. The word is officially used to signify counties in Wales. In the Gaelic form, Scottish traditional county names are generally distinguished by the designation siorramachd—literally "sheriffdom", e.g. Siorramachd Earra-ghaidheal (Argyllshire). This term corresponds to the jurisdiction of the sheriff in the Scottish legal system.

== North America ==
=== Canada ===
==== Alberta ====
A county in Alberta used to be a type of designation in a single-tier municipal system; but this was nominally changed to "municipal district" under the Municipal Government Act, when the County Act was repealed in the mid-1990s. However, at the time the new "municipal districts" were also permitted to retain the usage of county in their official names.

As a result, in Alberta, the term county is synonymous with the term municipal district – it is not its own incorporated municipal status that is different from that of a municipal district. As such, Alberta Municipal Affairs provides municipal districts with the opportunity to change to a county in their official names, but some have chosen to hold out with the municipal district title. The vast majority of "municipal districts" in Alberta are branded as counties.

==== British Columbia ====
British Columbia has counties for the purposes of its justice system but otherwise they hold no governmental function. For the provision of all other governmental services, the province is divided into regional districts that form the upper tier, which are further subdivided into local municipalities that are partly autonomous, and unincorporated electoral areas that are governed directly by the regional districts.

==== Manitoba ====
The province of Manitoba was divided into counties; however, these counties were abolished in 1890. Manitoba is divided into rural municipalities, which do not overlap with urban municipalities.

==== New Brunswick ====
The counties of New Brunswick were upper-tier governance units until the municipal reform of 1967; they were also used as electoral districts until 1973. They remain in use as census divisions by Statistics Canada and by locals as geographic identifiers. The Territorial Division Act defining them remains in effect; their subdivisions are called parishes; their government centres are called shiretowns.

==== Newfoundland and Labrador ====
Newfoundland and Labrador does not have any second-level administrative subdivision between the provincial government and its municipalities.

==== Northwest Territories ====
The Northwest Territories are divided into regions; however, these regions only serve to streamline the delivery of territorial governmental services, and have no government of their own.

==== Nova Scotia ====
Nova Scotia formerly had a two-tier system of local government in which counties were upper-tier municipalities.

==== Nunavut ====
Nunavut is divided into regions; however, these regions only serve to streamline the delivery of territorial governmental services, and have no government of their own.

==== Ontario ====
Ontario has a two-tier system of local government in which counties are upper-tier municipalities.

The primary administrative division of southern Ontario is its 22 counties, which are upper-tier local governments providing limited municipal services to rural and moderately dense areas—within them, there are a variety of lower-tier towns, cities, villages, etc. that provide most municipal services. This contrasts with northern Ontario's 10 districts, which are geographic divisions but not local governments—although some towns, etc. are within them that are local governments, the low population densities and much larger area have significant impacts on how government is organized and operates. In both northern and southern Ontario, urban densities in cities are one of two other local structures: regional municipalities (restructured former counties which are also upper-tier) or single-tier municipalities.

==== Prince Edward Island ====
The counties of Prince Edward Island are historical and have no governments of their own today. However, they remain used as census divisions by Statistics Canada, and by locals as geographic identifiers.

==== Quebec ====
Quebec has a two-tier system of local government in which counties are upper-tier municipalities. Quebec's counties are more properly called "regional county municipalities" (municipalités régionales de comté). The province's former counties proper were supplanted in the early 1980s.

==== Saskatchewan ====
Saskatchewan is divided into rural and urban municipalities, which do not overlap. Saskatchewan does not have any second-level administrative subdivision between the provincial government and the municipalities.

==== Yukon ====
Yukon does not have any second-level administrative subdivision between the territorial government and its municipalities.

=== Jamaica ===
Jamaica is divided into 14 parishes which are grouped together into three historic counties: Cornwall, Middlesex, and Surrey.

=== United States ===
The 3,143 counties and county equivalents of the United States

Counties in U.S. states are administrative or political subdivisions of the state in which their boundaries are drawn. In addition, the United States Census Bureau uses the term "county equivalent" to describe places that are comparable to counties, but called by different names.

Forty-seven of the 50 U.S. states use the term "county", while Alaska, Connecticut, and Louisiana use the terms "borough", "planning region", and "parish", respectively, for analogous jurisdictions. A consolidated city-county, such as the City and County of San Francisco, is formed when a city and county merge into one unified jurisdiction. Conversely, independent cities, including Baltimore, St. Louis, Carson City, and all cities in Virginia, legally belong to no county, i.e., no county even nominally exists in those places compared to a consolidated city-county where a county does legally exist in some form. Washington, D.C., is known as a federal city because it is outside the jurisdiction of any state; the U.S. Census Bureau treats it as a single county equivalent.

The specific governmental powers of counties vary widely between the states. They are generally the intermediate tier of state government, between the statewide tier and the immediately local government tier (typically a city, town/borough, or village/township). Some of the governmental functions that a county may offer include judiciary, county prisons, land registration, enforcement of building codes, and federally mandated services programs. Depending on the individual state, counties or their equivalents may be administratively subdivided into townships, boroughs or boros, or towns (in the New England states, New York, and Wisconsin).

New York City is a special case where the city is made up of five boroughs, each of which is territorially coterminous with a county, though not always with an identical name. The Bronx is Bronx County, Brooklyn is Kings County, Manhattan is New York County, Queens is Queens County, and Staten Island is Richmond County. In the context of city government, the boroughs are subdivisions of the city but are still called "county" where county function is involved, e.g., "New York County Courthouse".

County governments in Rhode Island and Connecticut have been completely abolished but the entities remain for administrative and statistical purposes in Rhode Island, while Connecticut has replaced them with planning regions served by councils of municipal governments. Alaska's 323,440-square-mile (837,700 km^{2}) Unorganized Borough also has no county equivalent government, but the U.S. Census Bureau further divides it into statistical county equivalent subdivisions called census areas. Massachusetts eliminated county governments in 8 of its 14 counties.

Today, 3,142 counties and county equivalents carve up the United States, ranging in number from 3 for Delaware to 254 for Texas. The areas of each county also vary widely between the states. For example, the territorially medium-sized state of Pennsylvania has 67 counties delineated in geographically convenient ways. By way of contrast, Massachusetts, with far less territory, has massively sized counties in comparison even to Pennsylvania's largest, (Note: e.g. Westmoreland, Washington in western Pennsylvania.) yet each organizes their judicial and incarceration officials similarly.

Most counties have a county seat: a city, town, or other named place where its administrative functions are centered. Some New England states use the term shire town to mean "county seat". A handful of counties like Harrison County, Mississippi, have two or more county seats, usually located on opposite sides of the county, dating back from the days when travel was difficult. In Virginia, where all cities are independent, some double as county seats despite not being part of a county. Notable examples include the independent City of Fairfax serving as the seat of Fairfax County and Salem serving as the county seat of Roanoke County.

== Oceania ==
=== Australia ===
In the eastern states of Australia, counties are used in the administration of land titles. They do not generally correspond to a level of government, but are used in the identification of parcels of land.

The local communities in Australia that share the same post code are usually referred to as suburbs or localities. Several neighboring suburbs are often serviced by the same local government known as a council, whose jurisdiction is officially known as the local government area (LGA). An LGA functions basically the same way as a county of other countries, although it is called instead as "city", "municipality", "shire", "borough", "town", "district" or simple "councils" depending on the state/territory and subregion. It performs municipal services and regulates permits for land uses, but lacks any legislative or law enforcement powers.

=== New Zealand ===
After New Zealand abolished its provinces in 1876, a system of counties similar to other countries' systems was instituted, lasting until 1989. They had chairmen, not mayors as boroughs and cities had; many legislative provisions (such as burial and land subdivision control) were different for the counties.

During the second half of the 20th century, many counties received overflow population from nearby cities. The result was often a merger of the two into a district (e.g. Rotorua) or a change of name to either district (e.g. Waimairi) or city (e.g. Manukau City).

The Local Government Act 1974 began the process of bringing urban, mixed, and rural councils into the same legislative framework. Substantial reorganisations under that Act resulted in the 1989 shake-up, which covered the country in (non-overlapping) cities and districts and abolished all the counties except for the Chatham Islands County, which survived under that name for a further 6 years but then became a "Territory" under the "Chatham Islands Council".

== South America ==
=== Argentina ===
Provinces in Argentina are divided into departments (Spanish: departamentos), except in the Buenos Aires Province, where they are called partidos. The Autonomous City of Buenos Aires is divided into communes (comunas).

=== Brazil ===
States in Brazil were divided into microregions (Portuguese: microrregiões) before they were replaced by "immediate geographic regions" in 2017.
