= List of free royal cities of Croatia =

This is a list of the cities proclaimed free royal cities in Croatia's history.

- 1209 – Varaždin – Granted by King Andrew II
- 1231 – Vukovar – Granted by Coloman of Galicia-Lodomeria
- 1234 – Virovitica – Granted by Coloman of Galicia-Lodomeria
- 1240 – Petrinja – Granted by Coloman of Galicia-Lodomeria, confirmed by King Béla IV in 1242
- 1242 – Zagreb – Granted by King Béla IV via the Golden Bull of 1242
- 1242 – Samobor – Granted by King Béla IV.
- 1244 – Ozalj – Granted by King Béla IV.
- 1245 – Križevci – Granted by Ban Stjepan, confirmed by King Béla IV in 1253
- 1262 – Bihać (today in Bosnia and Herzegovina, was Croatian at the time) – Granted by King Béla IV
- 1356 – Koprivnica – Confirmed by King Louis I
- 1765 – Požega – Granted by Empress Maria Theresa
- 1781 – Karlovac – Granted by Emperor Joseph II
- 1788 – Hrvatska Kostajnica – Granted by Emperor Joseph II
- 1809 – Osijek
- 1874 – Bjelovar – Granted by Ban Ivan Mažuranić
- 1874 – Sisak

== Sources ==
- "Slobodni kraljevski gradovi i trgovišta". Croatian Encyclopedia (in Croatian).
