= Direct-controlled municipality =

Type of city classification

A direct-controlled municipality, also known as centrally-governed city is the highest level classification for cities used by unitary states, with status equal to that of the provinces in the respective countries. A direct-controlled municipality is similar to, but not the same as, a federal district, a common designation in various countries for a municipality that is not part of any state, and which usually hosts some governmental functions. Usually direct-controlled municipality are under central government control with limited power. In some cases, a similar term in federal states is the federal city.

Many countries have adopted this system with some variations. Geographically and culturally, many of the municipalities are enclaves in the middle of provinces. Some occur in strategic positions in between provinces.

== List ==
Country	Municipalities	Main article
Belarus	Minsk	
Cambodia	Phnom Penh	
PR China	Beijing, Chongqing, Shanghai, Tianjin	Direct-administered municipalities of China
Kazakhstan	Almaty, Astana, Baikonur, Shymkent	
DPR Korea	Pyongyang, Nampho, Rason, Kaesong	Special cities of North Korea
RO Korea	Seoul, Busan, Daegu, Incheon, Gwangju, Daejeon, Ulsan, Sejong	Special cities of South Korea
Kyrgyzstan	Bishkek, Osh	
Laos	Vientiane	
Moldova	Chişinău, Bălți, Bender	
Mongolia	Ulaanbaatar	
Philippines	Highly urbanized cities: Manila, Angeles City, Bacolod, Baguio, Butuan, Cagayan de Oro, Caloocan, Cebu City, Davao City, General Santos, Iligan, Iloilo City, Lapu-Lapu, Las Piñas, Lucena, Makati, Malabon, Mandaluyong, Mandaue, Marikina, Muntinlupa, Navotas, Olongapo, Parañaque, Pasay, Pasig, Puerto Princesa, Quezon City, San Juan, Tacloban, Taguig, Valenzuela, Zamboanga City; Independent component cities: Cotabato City, Dagupan, Naga, Ormoc, Santiago; Independent municipality: Pateros	Cities of the Philippines § Independent cities
Taiwan	Taipei, Kaohsiung, New Taipei, Taichung, Tainan, Taoyuan	Special municipality (Taiwan)
Turkmenistan	Ashgabat	
Ukraine	Kyiv, Sevastopol (disputed)	
Uzbekistan	Tashkent	
Vietnam	Hanoi, Ho Chi Minh City, Haiphong, Da Nang, Cần Thơ, Huế, Đồng Nai (since 30 April 2026), Quảng Ninh (since 1 September 2026), Bắc Ninh (since 20 September 2026)	Municipalities of Vietnam

== See also ==
- Independent city
- Federal city
- Metropolitan Capitalism (Capital City)
- Federal district
- Federal territory
