= Free state (polity) =

Form of government

Free state is a term occasionally used in the official titles of some states throughout the world with varying meanings depending on the context. In principle, the title asserts and emphasises a particular freedom of the state in question, but this is not always reflected in practice. Some states use the title to assert sovereignty or independence from foreign domination, while others have used it to assert autonomy within a larger nation-state. Sometimes "free state" is used as a synonym for "republic".

The republican sense of the term derives from libera res publica (literally, "the free public thing/affair"), a term used by Latin historians for the period of the Roman Republic, though not all "free states" have been republics. The historical German free states and the Orange Free State of Southern Africa were republican in form, while the Congo Free State and Irish Free State were governed under forms of monarchy.

== Overview ==
=== Republican England ===
English Parliament, in the act forming the Commonwealth of England of 1649 to 1660, declared that "England is confirmed to be a Commonwealth and Free State and shall from henceforth be Governed as a Commonwealth and Free State." The Commonwealth had a republican constitution.

=== Germany ===
Flag of the modern Free State of Bavaria

In Germany, the term free state (in German, Freistaat pronounced [ˈfʁaɪ̯ˌʃtaːt]) comes from the 19th century as a German word for republic. After the German Revolution of November 1918, when Imperial Germany became a democratic republic, most of the German states within the German Reich called themselves a Free State. Others used expressions like Republik or Volksstaat (people's state) – though unpopular, as that term was associated with the enemy France.

After the Nazis came to power, they abolished the concept of a federal republic and a system of Gaue, with appointed Gauleiter leadership, largely took over the administrative functions of Germany, although de jure the states were not formally abolished.

After World War II states resumed their administrative role within the reduced borders of Allied-occupied Germany, albeit in a substantially re-organised form, with most of the new states being formed from the merger of several previous smaller states and Prussian Provinces. In East Germany all the reconstituted states used the title Land; they ceased to exist in 1952, being replaced with districts. In West Germany, only Bavaria still called itself a Free State and that made Freistaat an informal synonym for Bavaria. After the reunification, the re-established Saxony used the name again in 1992 and Thuringia began to use it for the first time in 1993 (its Weimar-era predecessor having always been Land Thüringen).

==== Free Cities ====
Historically, Germany had Imperial Free Cities, who were subject only to the Emperor of the Holy Roman Empire. During the French Revolutionary and Napoleonic Wars the empire was substantially reorganised. In particular the 1803 Reichsdeputationshauptschluss saw the vast majority of the empire's free cities "mediatised" to other states. The empire finally fell in 1806. Napoleon annexed the final free cities – Hamburg, Bremen, Lübeck – in 1811. In 1815, with the Napoleonic Wars over the German Confederation was established by the Congress of Vienna in the place of the Holy Roman Empire and four free cities were re-established, now as sovereign entities within the confederation: Hamburg, Bremen, Lübeck and Frankfurt. Frankfurt was annexed by Prussia in 1866 following the Austro-Prussian War; the North German Confederation was established in place of the German Confederation in 1867, which became the German Empire in 1871. Lübeck lost its status in 1937 (Greater Hamburg Act). Since 1949, the Federal Republic of Germany has Hamburg (Freie und Hansestadt, Free and Hanseatic City) and Bremen (Freie Hansestadt), as well as Berlin, as a city which is also a state. Like the Free States these three cities have no special rights in the federation.

According to the Versailles Treaty, Danzig (Gdańsk) was split off from Germany in 1920, becoming the Free City of Danzig (Freie Stadt Danzig). Napoleon had also established Danzig as a free city in 1807.

=== Africa ===
Flag of the now defunct Orange Free State

In South Africa, the term free state was used in the title of the nineteenth century Orange Free State (Oranje Vrystaat in Afrikaans) and is today used in the title of its successor, Free State; both entities were established as republican in form.

In contrast, the Congo Free State came into being between 1877 and 1884 as a private kingdom or dictatorship of King Leopold II of Belgium. In this case, the term free emphasised the new state's freedom from major colonial powers and the Belgian parliament, as the colony was ruled only by the king.

=== Irish Free State ===
The modern Republic of Ireland was known from 1922–1937 as the Irish Free State.

The Irish Free State of 1922–1937 was a dominion of the British Empire. The term free state was deliberately chosen as a literal translation of the Irish word saorstát. At the time in which Irish nationalist leaders (who generally favoured a republican form of government) were negotiating the secession of Ireland from the United Kingdom, the word saorstát was a commonly used Irish-language word for republic. The British government was opposed to the Free State being established as a republic (which would mean severing Ireland's links with the British Crown) and so insisted that the literal translation of saorstát be used in the new state's English title instead. The term saorstát thus represented a compromise in terminology: British officials could accept it as a less explicit rejection of Ireland's links to the Crown than the term republic itself, while Irish republicans could choose to interpret it as signifying a republic by any other name.

=== Puerto Rico ===
Flag of the Estado Libre Asociado de Puerto Rico ("Free Associated State of Puerto Rico")

The official Spanish name of the Commonwealth of Puerto Rico is Estado Libre Asociado de Puerto Rico, literally, "Free Associated State of Puerto Rico", expressing a "politically organized community” or “State,” which is simultaneously connected by a compact to a larger political system and hence does not have an independent and separate status. However, according to the United States Supreme Court, Puerto Rico is not free or associated; it is only a state in the general sense, not as a state of the Union in the U.S. constitutional sense. According to consistent U.S. Supreme Court jurisprudence, Puerto Rico belongs to but is not an integral part (Organized incorporated territory) of the United States. Moreover, the said jurisprudence has determined that regardless of what nominal or cosmetic veneer has moted Puerto Rico's political status, it is essentially a U.S. colonial territory, since it is under the plenary powers of the U.S. Congress. At its most basic, this Supreme Court doctrine expresses that Puerto Rico is more like property, far from a free-governing community or nation, and thus "domestic in a foreign sense" (not for the taking or meddling by free foreign nations), but "foreign in a domestic sense" (not a partner or an equal). In the Insular Cases, the Court ruled that the United States Constitution does not automatically apply in Puerto Rico.

== List of 'free states' ==
=== Contemporary ===
- Free State of Bavaria
- Free State of Saxony
- Free State of Thuringia
- Free State, South Africa
- Free Associated State of Puerto Rico

=== Historical ===
- Commonwealth of England (1649–1660)
- Free State of Costa Rica (1838–1847)
- Orange Free State (1854–1900)
- Free State of Jones (1863–1865)
- Congo Free State (1884–1908)
- Klein Vrystaat "Little Free State" (1886–1891)
- Free State of Icaria (1912)
- Free State of Fiume (1920–1924)
- Kamchatka Free State (1921–1922)
- Irish Free State (1922–1937)
- Free Territory of Trieste (1947–1954)
- Free Lebanon State (1979-1984)

==== Germany ====
- Free State of Bottleneck (Flaschenhals) (1919–1923)
- Free State of Waldeck-Pyrmont (1918–1921), Free State of Waldeck (1921-1929)
- Free State of Mecklenburg-Schwerin (1918–1933)
- Free State of Mecklenburg-Strelitz (1918–1933)
- Free State of Anhalt (1918–1945)
- Free State of Brunswick (1918–1945)
- Free State of Oldenburg (1918–1946)
- Free State of Schaumburg-Lippe (1918–1945)
- Free State of Lippe (1918–1947)
- Free State of Prussia (1920–1947)
- Free State of Bavaria (1919–1945; succeeded by modern Free State of Bavaria)
- Free People's State of Württemberg (1918–1945)
- Free Republic of Schwarzenberg (May–June 1945)
- Freistaat Baden (1945–1952; called Südbaden "South Baden" until 1947)
- Thuringia
  - Free State of Saxe-Altenburg (1918–1920)
  - Free State of Saxe-Gotha (1918–1920)
  - Free State of Saxe-Meiningen (1918–1920)
  - Free State of Saxe-Weimar-Eisenach (1918–1920)
  - Free State of Coburg (1918–1920)
  - Free State of Schwarzburg-Rudolstadt (1918–1920)
  - Free State of Schwarzburg-Sondershausen (1918–1920)

== See also ==
- Free city (disambiguation)
- Freetown
- List of former sovereign states
