= Free Stater =

The term Free Stater may refer to:

- Free-Stater (Kansas), (antislavery) settlers in Kansas Territory in the 1850s
- Free Stater (Ireland), those in Ireland who supported the Anglo-Irish Treaty of 1921
- A term informally used by some people in Northern Ireland to refer to residents of the Republic of Ireland
- A participant in the Free State Project

== See also ==
- Free state (disambiguation)
