= Royal free city =

Cities in the Kingdom of Hungary

A royal free city, or free royal city (libera regia civitas), was the official term for the most important cities in the Kingdom of Hungary from the late 12th century to the Hungarian Revolution of 1848.

The cities were granted certain privileges by the King of Hungary to prevent their control by the Hungarian nobility, hence "royal", and exercised some self-government in relation to their internal affairs and so were "free". From the late 14th century, the elected envoys of the royal free cities participated in the sessions of the Hungarian Diet and so they became part of the legislature. This list also includes cities in the Kingdom of Croatia and the Banate of Bosnia, which were part of the Lands of the Hungarian Crown.

A royal town had a ruling council, usually with members elected for life, and was headed by a prior (a prince or a mayor), who in turn had a captain and a judge, which were all temporary elected positions. All citizens were considered ennobled.

The term "royal free city" in the kingdom's languages is as follows:

- Latin: Libera regia civitas
- Hungarian: Szabad királyi város
- German: Königliche Freistadt
- Romanian: Oraș liber regesc
- Slovak: Slobodné kráľovské mesto
- Croatian: Slobodni kraljevski grad
- Serbian: Слободни краљевски град, romanized: Slobodni kraljevski grad

They had a status similar to the free imperial cities in the Holy Roman Empire.

== List of royal free cities in Kingdom of Hungary ==
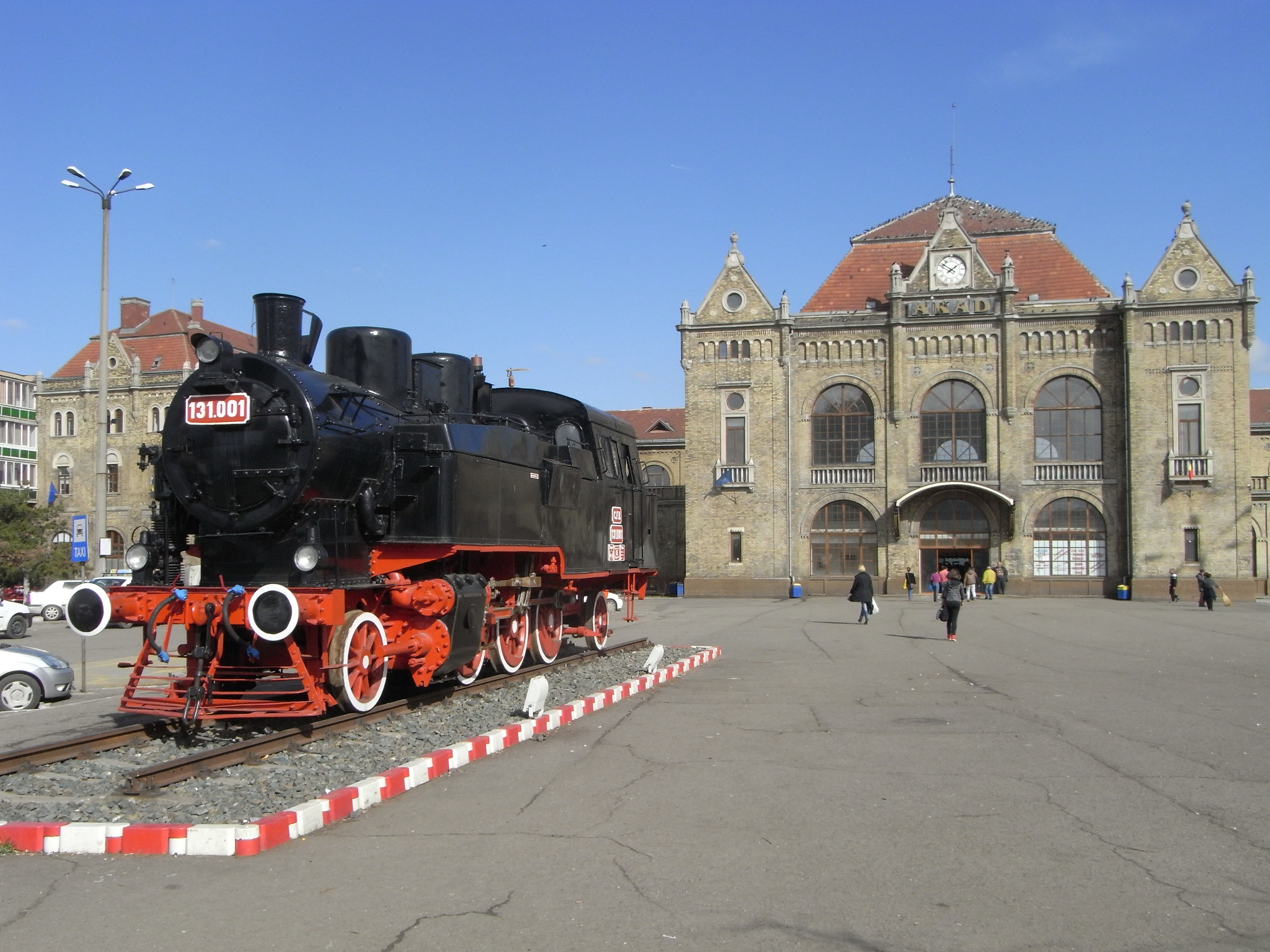
Arad railway station

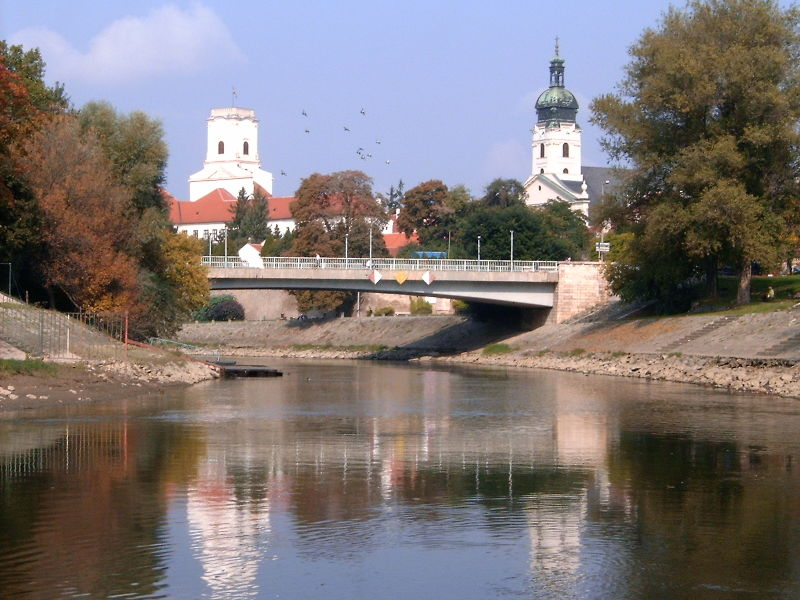
Rába at Győr

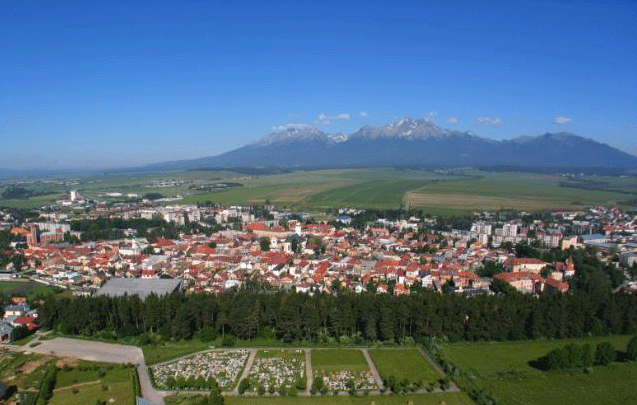
View from above Kežmarok (Késmárk)

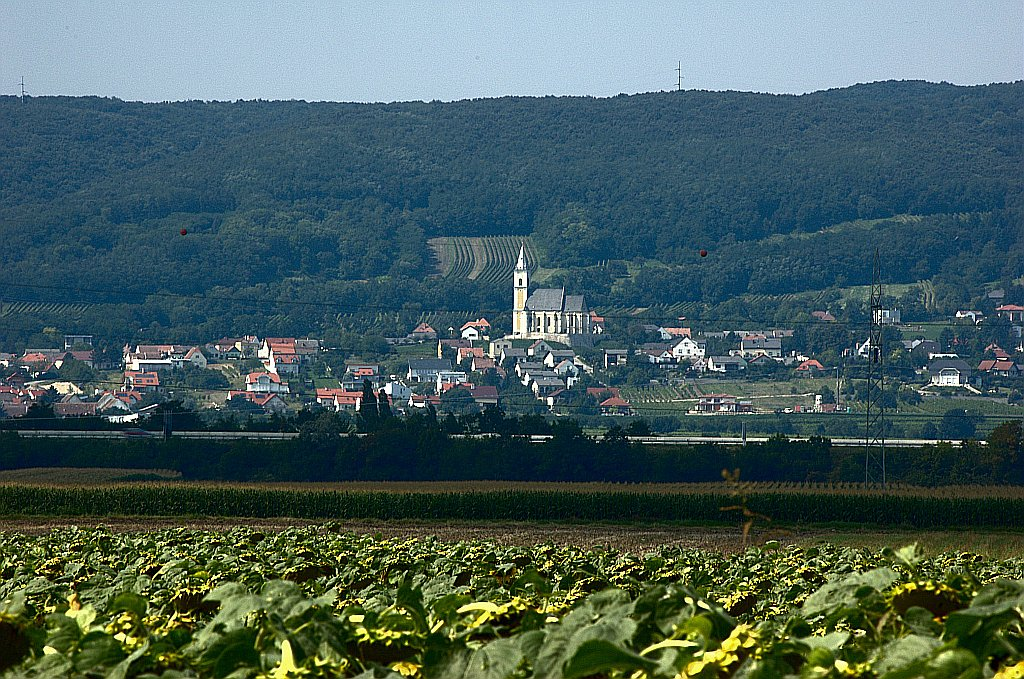
Kleinhöflein (Kishöflány) im Burgenland at the foot of the Leitha Mountains (Lajta-hegység)

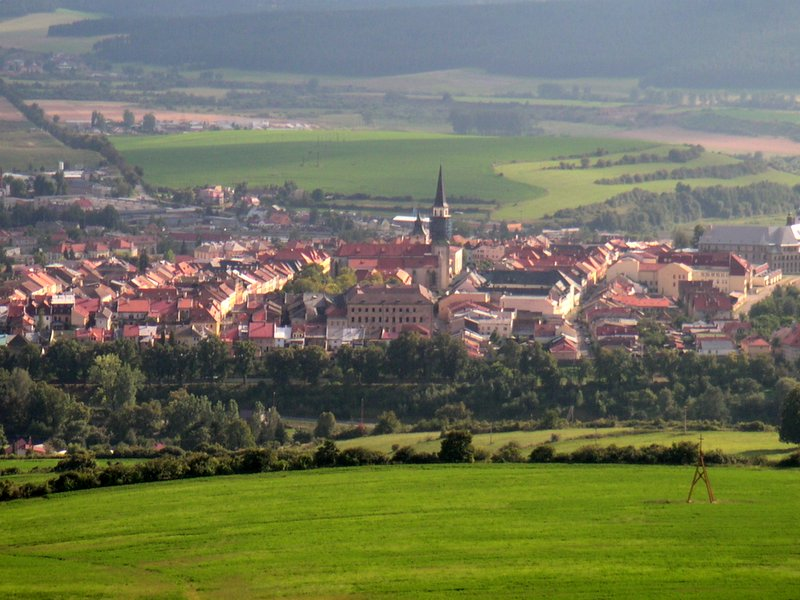
Levoča (Lőcse) from Mariánska hora (Máriahegy)

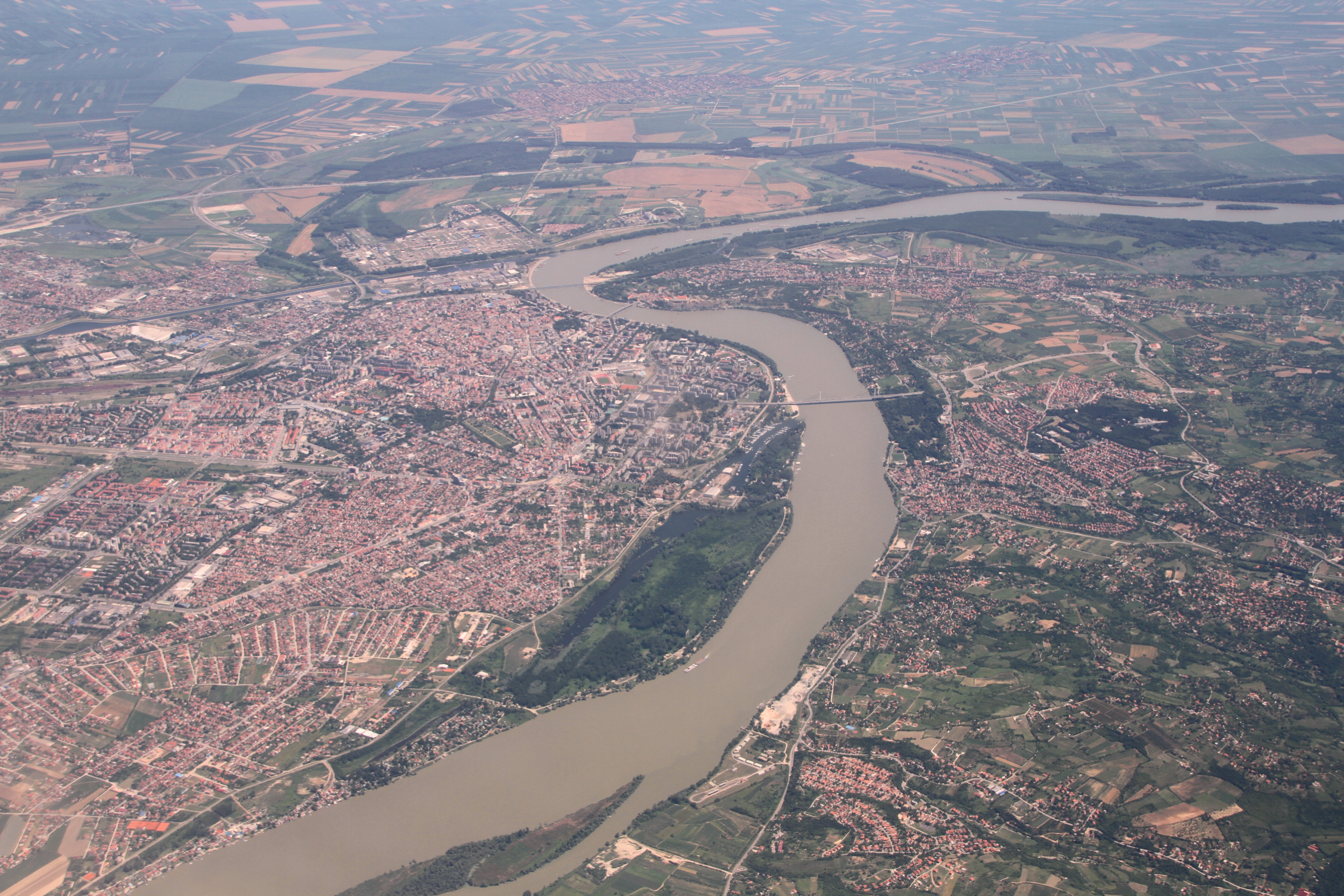
Novi Sad (Újvidék)

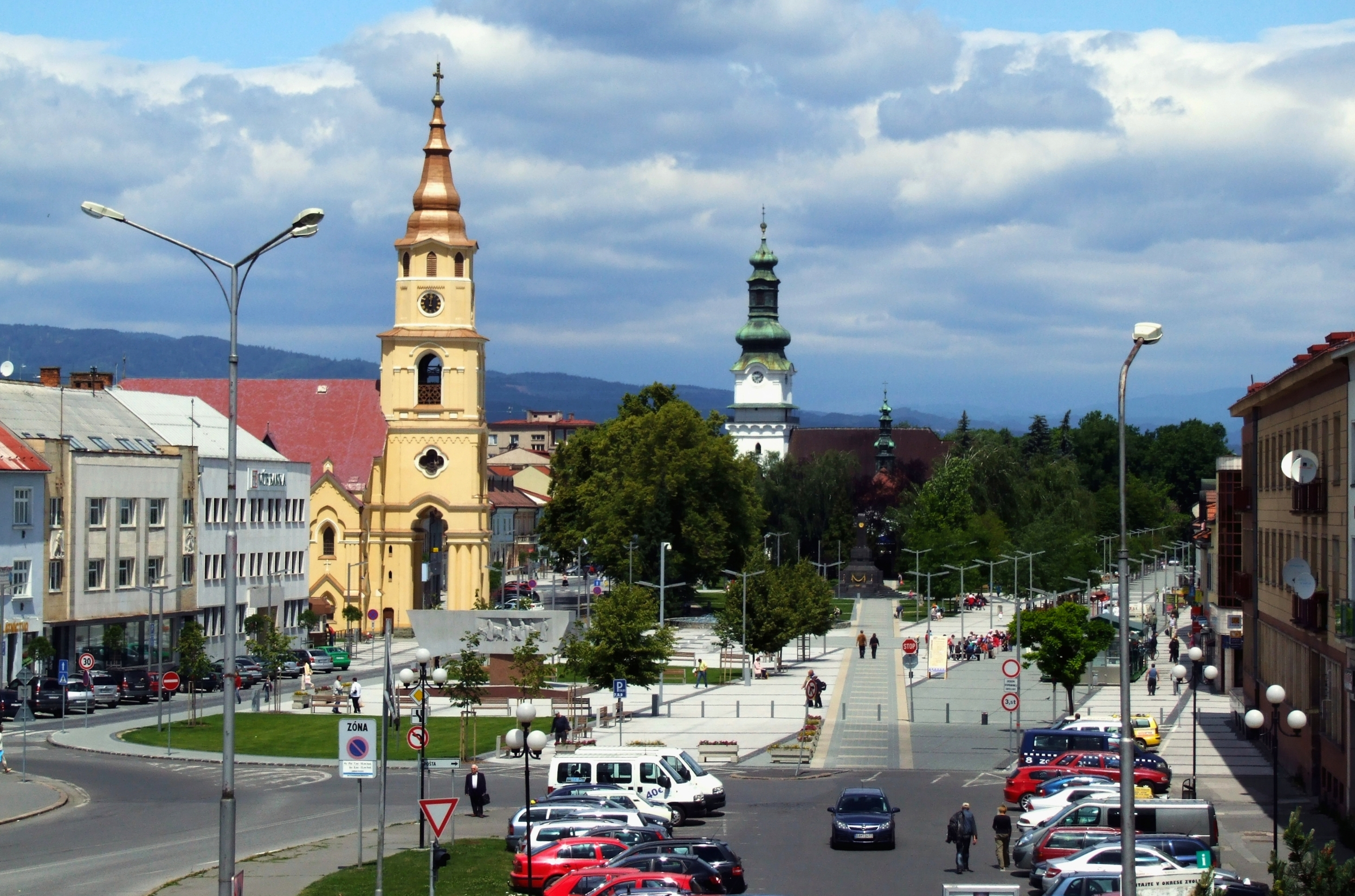
Zvolen (Zólyom)

Current English name	Hungarian name	Other historical names
Alba Iulia	Gyulafehérvár	German: Karlsburg
Arad	Arad	
Baia Mare	Nagybánya	German: Frauenbach
Baia Sprie	Felsőbánya	German: Mittelstadt
Banská Bystrica	Besztercebánya	
Banská Štiavnica	Selmecbánya	
Bardejov	Bártfa	
Bistrița	Beszterce	German: Bistritz
Bratislava	Pozsony	German: Pressburg, Slovak: Prešporok, Croatian: Požun
Brezno	Breznóbánya	
Budapest (Buda)	Buda	
Cluj-Napoca	Kolozsvár	German: Klausenburg, Romanian: Cluj
Debrecen	Debrecen	Croatian: Debrecin
Eisenstadt	Kismarton	
Erzsébetváros	Erzsébetváros	
Esztergom	Esztergom	
Gherla	Szamosújvár	German: Neuschloss
Győr	Győr	
Hódmezővásárhely		Hódmező-Vásárhely
Kecskemét		
Kežmarok	Késmárk	
Komárom	Komárom	
Košice	Kassa	German: Kas‌‌‌schau
Kőszeg	Kőszeg	
Kremnica	Körmöcbánya	
Levoča	Lőcse	
Ľubietová	Libetbánya	
Mediaș	Medgyes	German: Mediasch
Modra	Modor	
Nová Baňa	Újbánya	
Novi Sad	Újvidék	
Oradea	Nagyvárad	Croatian: Veliki Varadin
Orăștie	Szászváros	German: Broos
Pécs	Pécs	Croatian: Pečuh
Pest	Pest	
Pezinok	Bazin	
Prešov	Eperjes	
Pukanec	Bakabánya	
Rust	Ruszt	
Sabinov	Kisszeben	
Satu Mare	Szatmárnémeti	Romanian: Sătmar
Sebeș	Szászsebes	German: Mühlbach
Sfântu Gheorghe	Sepsiszentgyörgy	German: Sankt Georg
Sibiu	Nagyszeben	German: Hermannstadt
Sighișoara	Segesvár	Schäßburg
Skalica	Szakolca	
Sombor	Zombor	
Sopron	Sopron	German: Ödenburg
Subotica	Szabadka	
Szeged	Szeged	Croatian: Segedin
Székesfehérvár	Székesfehérvár	
Târgu-Mureș	Marosvásárhely	German: Neumarkt am Marosch
Timișoara	Temesvár	German: Temeschvar, Croatian: Temišvar
Trenčín	Trencsén	
Trnava	Nagyszombat	
Veľký Šariš	Nagysáros	
Zvolen	Zólyom	

=== In the Kingdom of Croatia and Slavonia ===
Name	Hungarian name	Other historical names and notes
Bakar		
Bihać	Bihács	Bišće, Bić; until the loss to the Ottoman Empire in 1592
Karlovac		
Koprivnica		
Krapina	Korpona	
Križevci		
Osijek		
Požega		
Rijeka	Fiume	Corpus separatum
Ruma		
Samobor		
Senj		
Sisak		
Varaždin		
Vukovar	Vukovár, Valkóvár	German: Wukowar
Virovitica		
Zagreb	Zágráb	Gradec, German: Agram

=== Towns with only partial privileges ===
Current English name	Hungarian name	Other historical names
Banská Belá	Bélabánya	
Belá-Dulice	Turócbéla	
Berehove	Beregszász	
Braşov	Brassó	German: Kronstadt
Miskolc		Croatian: Miškolc
Kiskunfélegyháza		Kis-Kuhn-Félegyháza
Nitra	Nyitra	
Podolínec	Podolin	
Sighetu Marmatiei	Máramarossziget	German: Marmaroschsiget
Šamorín	Somorja	Slovak: Zent Maria, Samaria; German: Sommerein
Uzhhorod	Ungvár	
Vasvár	Vasvár	
Vršac	Versec	

== See also ==
- Administrative divisions of the Kingdom of Hungary
- Free city (disambiguation)
- Free Royal Cities Act
- List of free royal cities of Croatia
- Royal city in Poland (Polish: Miasto Królewskie)

== Sources ==
- Štefánik, Martin; Lukačka, Ján, eds. (2010). Lexikón stredovekých miest na Slovensku [Lexicon of Medieval Towns in Slovakia] (PDF) (in Slovak and English). Bratislava: Historický ústav SAV. ISBN 978-80-89396-11-5. Archived from the original (PDF) on 2014-03-02.
- Sršan, Stjepan (2012). "Povratak ustavnog poretka u Hrvatskoj 1860. godine i politički stavovi biskupa Josipa J. Strossmayera do kraja 1862. godine - za 150. obljetnicu višestranačkog rada Hrvatskog sabora" [The Restoration of Constitutional Order in Croatia in 1860 and Political Position of Bishop Josip Juraj Strossmayer at the End of 1862. In honour of the 150th Anniversary of the Multi-Party System in Croatian Parliament]. Povijesni zbornik : godišnjak za kulturu i povijesno naslijeđe (in Croatian). 4 (5). Department of History, Faculty of Philosophy, University of Osijek.
- Holjevac, Željko; Rimac, Marko (2011). "Zemlje ugarske krune u doba mađarskoga milenija" [Lands of the Holy Crown of Hungary at the time of the Hungarian Millenium]. Historijski zbornik (in Croatian). 64 (1). Croatian Historical Society.
- Lozina, Duško; Jagnjić, Josipa (2021). "Razvoj lokalne samouprave u Republici Hrvatskoj" [Development of local self-government in the Republic of Croatia]. Zbornik radova Pravnog fakulteta u Splitu (in Croatian). 58 (2). Faculty of Law, University of Split.
