= Free State Review =

US literary journal

Free State Review is a biannual literary journal published in print by Galileo Books and features drama, fiction, nonfiction, and poetry. The journal is based in Aiken, South Carolina and ships issues nationally in the U.S. and internationally. The journal allows simultaneous submissions but no reprints. Contributors include but are not limited to Gerald Locklin, Ed Field, James Robison, Elizabeth Spires, Gary Fincke, and Robert Cooperman. The editors are Barrett Warner, J. Wesley Clark, Robert Timberg. They support their authors by reviewing their recent books in other publications and by organizing contributor readings in Pennsylvania, Maryland, Virginia and Washington, D.C. Furthermore, the editors feature a different contributor poem or story each week on The Bubbler, the Free State Review blog, in the form of a traditional blog post or a stylized video recording.

== History ==
Free State Review was founded in 2012 by Hal Burdett, J. Wesley Clark, and Barrett Warner. Initially, submissions were generated by word of mouth until its website launched in 2013. The first issue, which came out in 2013, featured a painting by Pulitzer prize winning poet Mark Strand. The journal's motto is "Totally Limited Omniscience".

== Masthead ==
=== Publisher ===
Galileo Books (Julia Wendell)

=== Editors ===
- Hal Burdett
- J. Wesley Clark
- Barrett Warner
- Robert Timberg
- Raphaela Cassandra

=== Author Liaison ===
Anniebelle Lynn Quattlebaum

=== Poetry Consultants ===
Elizabeth Carothers Herron

Edgar Gabriel Silex

=== Art & Design ===
Jessica Lynn Dotson
