= Freetown (disambiguation) =

Freetown is the capital of Sierra Leone.

Freetown may also refer to:

== Places ==
- Freetown, Antigua and Barbuda
- Freetown, Bahamas
- Freetown (Belize House constituency), in the Belize District of Belize
- Freetown, alternatively Free Town, an area of Bury, Greater Manchester, England

=== United States ===
- Freetown, Alabama
- Freetown, Indiana
- In Louisiana:
  - Freetown-Port Rico Historic District in the city of Lafayette
  - Informal name for McDonoghville, a community spanning the neighborhoods of Algiers and Gretna
  - A rural area in St. Rose, Louisiana, also known as Elkinsville
  - A rural area on the western bank of the Mississippi River, midway between New Orleans and Baton Rouge
  - A rural area in St. Mary Parish, south of Glencoe
- Freetown, Maryland, now Atholton
- Freetown, Massachusetts
  - Freetown station
- Freetown, New York
- Freetown (East Hampton), New York
- In Virginia:
  - Freetown, Virginia, in Albemarle County
  - Freetown, Virginia, in Orange County, the childhood home of Edna Lewis

== Other uses ==
- Freetown (film), a 2015 American film
- Freetown, a fictional town in the 2021 streaming series Star Wars: The Book of Boba Fett

== See also ==
- Free city (disambiguation)
- Freetown Christiania, an intentional community and commune in Denmark
- Libreville, the capital city of Gabon
