= St. John's Fire District =

Fire departments in South Carolina, United States

Operational area
- Country: United States
- State: South Carolina
- County: Charleston

Agency overview
- Established: 1959
- Employees: 150
- Staffing: Career
- Fire chief: Ryan Kunitzer
- EMS level: BLS

Facilities and equipment
- Stations: 7
- Engines: 7
- Trucks: 3
- Tenders: 1
- Wildland: 2
- Fireboats: 2

Website
- Official Website

The St. John's Fire District as established in 1959 pursuant with Legislative Act 369 to provide fire protection and associated services. Operating from seven strategically located stations, the District provides fire, rescue, and emergency medical services. The District is managed by a Commission composed of nine individuals.

== History ==
The St. John's Fire District was organized in 1959 by virtue of legislation to establish a political subdivision to provide fire protection for a territory in Charleston County consisting of the area contained in St. John's School District No. 9. The District was governed by a body of three individuals appointed by the Governor. The District is organized as a Special Purpose District defined in the South Carolina Code of Laws §6-11-1610.

In the aftermath of the Sofa Super Store fire, Charleston area fire jurisdictions began working enhanced cooperation for emergency services delivery. On July 30, 2011 the St. John's Fire District entered inter into an inter-local emergency services automatic aid agreement. The agreement establish improved emergency services delivery with service being provided regardless if jurisdiction. Initial the pact included five agencies including the Charleston Fire Department, North Charleston Fire Department, James Island Public Service District Fire Department, and St. Andrews Fire Department. In 2022 the agreement was renewed with two additional agencies, Mount Pleasant Fire Department and Isle of Palms Fire Department, joining.

== Service Area ==
The St. John's Fire District is located in eastern Charleston County, just south of the city of Charleston. The District's total service area is approximately 190 square miles. This service area includes the municipalities of Kiawah Island, Seabrook Island, and Rockville along with unincorporated areas of Charleston County. Recognized as rapidly growing regions of the state, the area encompasses populated suburban areas, rural farmlands, retail, light commercial. Notably, the District covers historic landmarks, pristine beaches, extensive navigable waterways, and a number of golf courses including the renowned Kiawah Island Golf Resort Ocean Course.

== Apparatus ==
The St. John's Fire District utilizes the apparatus numbering system and nomenclature adopted by Charleston County fire agencies as part of a consolidation of dispatch services that occurred in 2009. Apparatus are assigned an alpha-numeric callsign. The alphabetic prefix identifies the type of apparatus. The following numerical digits identify the jurisdiction of the apparatus followed by the station assignment or apparatus number. St. John's jurisdictional identifier is 7. An example of this system is the engine operating from station 5 has the callsign E705.

=== Engine ===
The District uses a standardized configuration for fire engines. Each engine is a "triple-combination pumper" as it has a fire pump, water tank and fire hose. Equipped with a 1,500 gallons per minute fire pump the apparatus carries 1000 gallons of water along with multiple ground ladders as well as various types of firefighting, rescue and medical equipment. All frontline engines are outfitted with a Class A foam system. In addition to the frontline units, the District maintains a fleet of reserve engines.

=== Ladder ===
Truck company functions are delivered primarily through aerial apparatus, including ladders and towers. The District has two 75' rear-mount ladders. These ladder trucks are quints as they have a fire pump and water tank.

=== Tower ===
The District operates one aerial platform referred to as a tower. The apparatus is Pierce 95' mid-mount aerial ladder with a platform on a Velocity chassis. The tower is outfitted with 155' of ground ladders and specialized rescue equipment along with a 2000 gallons per minute fire pump and 300 gallons of water. The current tower replaced a 2005 E-One Bronto Skylift 114' articulating platform, the first of its kind in the state of South Carolina.

=== Water Tender ===
The unique response area includes large areas that are without a municipal water supply. In order to provide fire suppression capabilities, the District operates two water tenders. Each is capable of transporting 3,000 gallons of water.

== Stations and apparatus ==
The District operates seven stations with location and frontline units outlined below.

Fire station	Address	Engine Company	Truck Company	Command Unit	Special Unit
1	3327 Maybank Highway, Johns Island	Engine 701		Battalion 701	Rehab 701
2	3025 Cap'n Sam's Road Seabrook Island	Engine 702	Ladder 704		Marine 701
3	1932 Liberia Road, Wadmalaw Island	Engine 703			Tender 703
4	12 Sora Rail Road, Kiawah Island	Engine 704	Tower 701		
5	4550 River Road, Johns Island	Engine 705			Brush 701
6	66 Ocean Course Drive, Kiawah Island	Engine 706			
7	1148 Main Road, Johns Island	Engine 707	Ladder 707		Boat 701

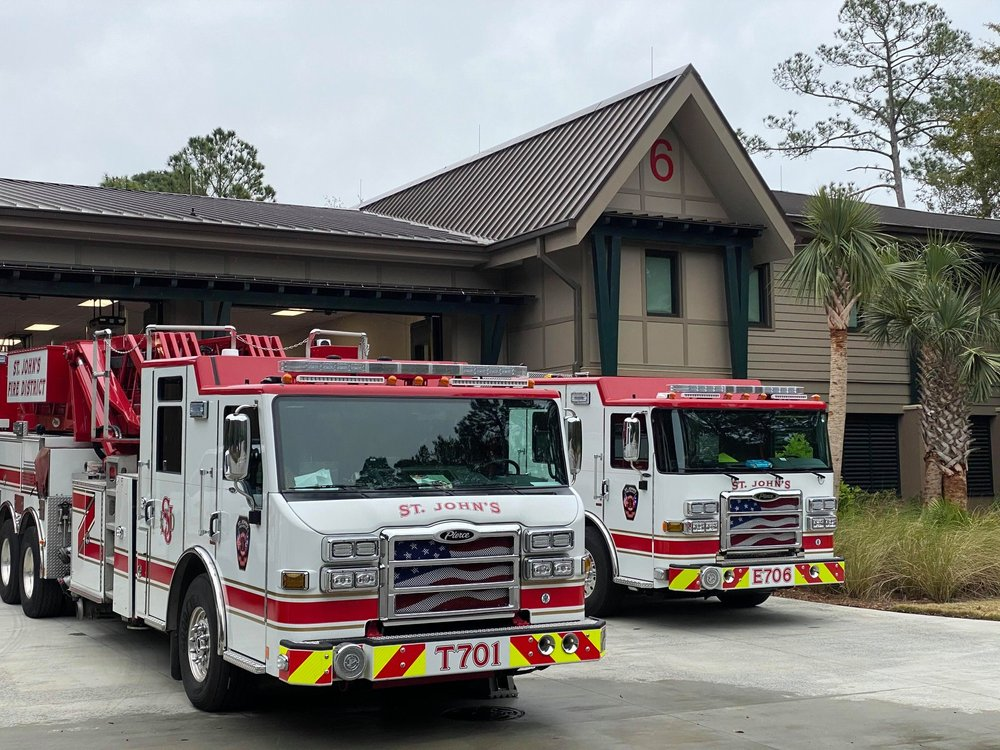
St. John's Fire District Station 6

== Fire apparatus livery ==
The St. John's Fire District utilizes a unique livery consisting of a white body and a red cab roof accompanied by red and gold reflective striping.
