= Federal city =

City title in Germany, Switzerland, Russia, and several national capitals

The term federal city is a title for certain cities in Germany, Switzerland, Russia, and several national capitals.

== Germany ==
In Germany, the former West German capital Bonn has been designated with the title of federal city (Bundesstadt), making it unique in Germany. Since 28 April 1994, it is the secondary official residence of the president of Germany, the chancellor of Germany, the Bundesrat (upper house), the primary official residence of six federal ministries, and approximately 20 federal authorities. This is merely a title, since Bonn is not an autonomous city like Berlin, Bremen or Hamburg, but part of a state (North Rhine-Westphalia).

== Russia ==
See also federal cities of Russia.

The Russian constitution states that it has three cities of federal importance (город федерального значения, gorod federalnogo znacheniya): Moscow, St. Petersburg and Sevastopol (disputed with Ukraine since the 2014 Russian annexation of Crimea).

== Switzerland ==
Federal city (German: Bundesstadt; French: ville fédérale; Italian: città federale; Romansh: citad federala) is the official title of Bern, as it is the seat of the Federal Assembly (parliament) and Federal Council (government). Switzerland deliberately has no official capital city, and the federal courts of Switzerland are dispersed in various cities for the same reason.

== Others ==
Some national capitals, like Astana, Bogotá, Brasília, Buenos Aires, Canberra, Caracas, Islamabad, Jakarta, Jerusalem, Mexico City, Seoul, Washington, D.C., and Yerevan, among others, have a federal status, not belonging to any state or province (or being a state or province of their own, as is the case of Berlin, Delhi, Moscow, Oslo, Prague, Sofia, and other cities). Sometimes this is called a federal district. Washington D.C. was referred to as "Federal City" in its planning stages.

Several unitary states have direct-controlled municipalities, cities equivalent in status to provinces, which often include the national capital. Examples include the four direct-administered municipalities of China, which include the capital city, Beijing.

== See also ==
- Free city (disambiguation)
- Independent city
