= California Free State =

Tabletop role-playing game

California Free State is a 1996 role-playing game supplement for Shadowrun published by FASA.

== Contents ==
California Free State is an area sourcebook that focuses on California.

== Reception ==
Andy Butcher reviewed California Free State for Arcane magazine, rating it a 9 out of 10 overall. Butcher comments that "Regardless of what style of game you play [...] California Free State has a great deal to offer any Shadowrun group. Excellent stuff."

== Reviews ==
- Shadis #27 (May, 1996)
- Casus Belli #93
