= Barrett Warner =

American writer (born 1962)

- John Barrett Warner
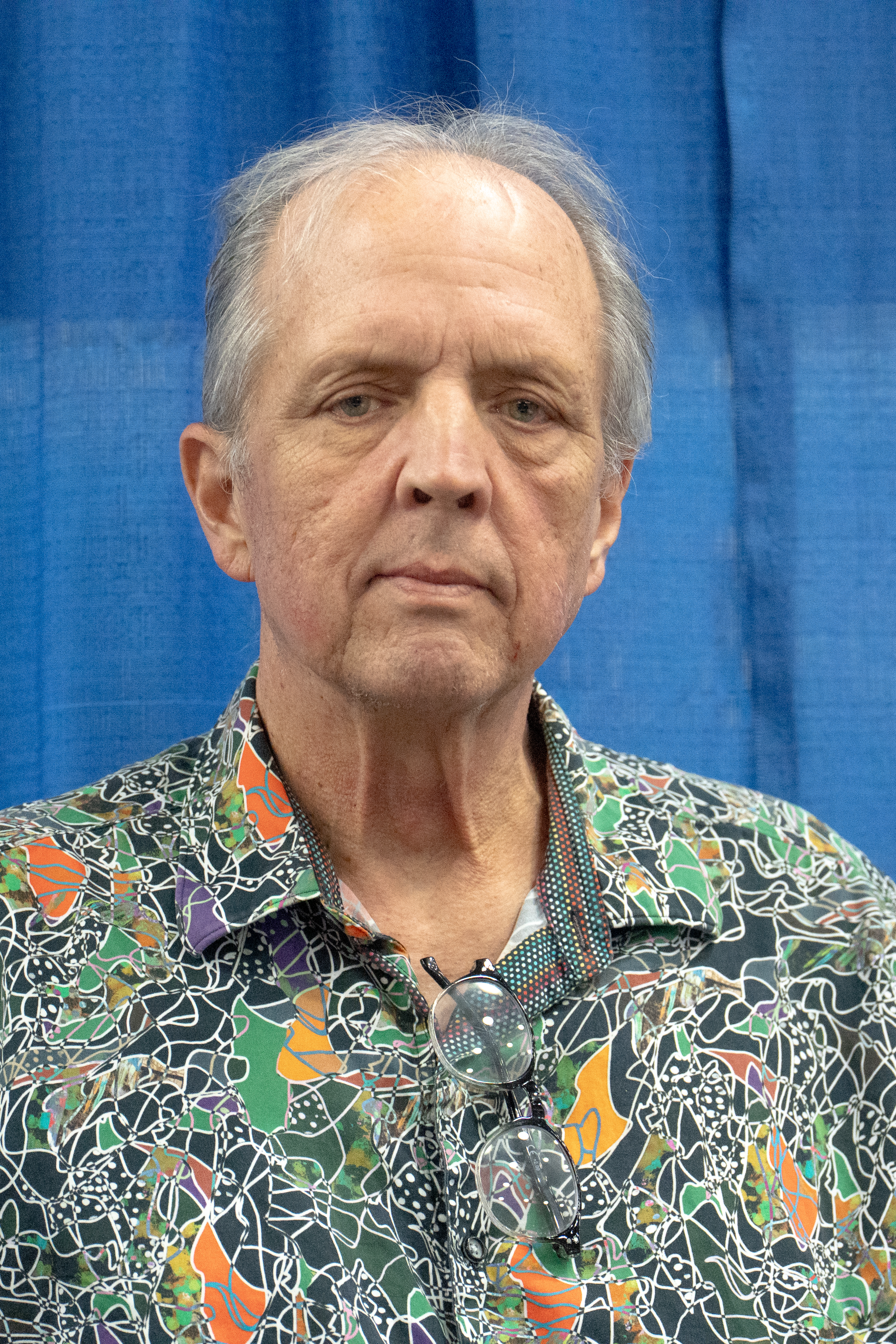
- Warner in 2026
- Born: April 1, 1962 (age 64); Westminster, Maryland, U.S.
- Education: College of William and Mary (B.A. in English and American Studies); Bennington College (M.F.A in Poetry)
- Occupations: Short story writer; poet; essayist; editor
- Spouse: Julia Wendell
- Writing career
- Language: English
- Notable work: Why Is It So Hard to Kill You?
- Website: barrettwarner.com

Barrett Warner (born April 1, 1962) is an American short story writer, poet, essayist, critic, and editor. The author of Until I’m Blue in the Face (1990), My Friend Ken Harvey (2014), and Why Is It So Hard to Kill You? (2016), his work has appeared in numerous literary journals and zines. He is a recipient of the Salamander fiction prize, the Tucson Festival of Books essay prize, and the Liam Rector, Chris Toll Memorial Chapbook, Cloudbank, and Princemere poetry prizes. In 2016, in recognition of his Maryland farm essays, he received an Individual Artist Award from the Maryland State Arts Council. He used the grant to finance his move to South Carolina. Since 1983, he has been a genre editor for several literary magazines including William and Mary Review, Blood Lotus, Whomanwarp, and Free State Review. He currently serves as general editor of Free State Review as well as acquisitions editor for its publisher, Galileo Books, Ltd. He is married to author and poet Julia Wendell.

== Early life ==
Warner was born in Carroll Hospital in Westminster, Maryland. His interest in journey-to-the-edge writing began after reading The Magical Monarch of Mo by L. Frank Baum. He earned a B.A. in English and American Studies from the College of William and Mary, where he was awarded the G. Glenwood Clark Poetry Prize as well as the Thomas Jefferson Prize in Linguistics for his work on Sir Thomas Morton's use of adjectives and nouns in 17th century frontier writing. After college, he was a finalist for a Wallace Stegner fellowship at Stanford University, but he moved into his grandmother's Buick and lived on the road. Warner began to publish poetry and fiction in 1981 and spent several years as a freelance writer focusing on personal essays, stock car racing, motorcycle and horse racing. In 1994, he shifted primarily to writing poetry and received a M.F.A in poetry from Bennington College.

== Publications and career ==
Warner has published some fifteen short stories and two hundred poems, which have appeared in Gargoyle, California Quarterly, Comstock Review, Natural Bridge, Berkeley Fiction Review, Quarter after Eight, Crescent Review, Phoebe, Southeast Review, Berkeley Poetry Review, Beloit Poetry Journal, etc.

In 1990, the Tropos Press in Baltimore, MD, published a chapbook of Warner's poems entitled 'Til I'm Blue in the Face. His next chapbook collection appeared in 2014, My Friend Ken Harvey, which was published by the Atlanta-based Publishing Genius Press.

Warner's debut collection of poems, Why Is It so Hard to Kill You? was published in February, 2016 by Somondoco Press in Hagerstown, MD. Ed Ochester, editor of Pitt Poetry Series, has said "Barrett Warner's poems are characteristically a mixture of the Marx Brothers, Russell Edson and James Tate, with touches of Dorothy Parker and H.P. Lovecraft-which is to say they really aren't like anyone else's. I think they're terrific fun to read and, for such entertainments, wise about both heart and head."

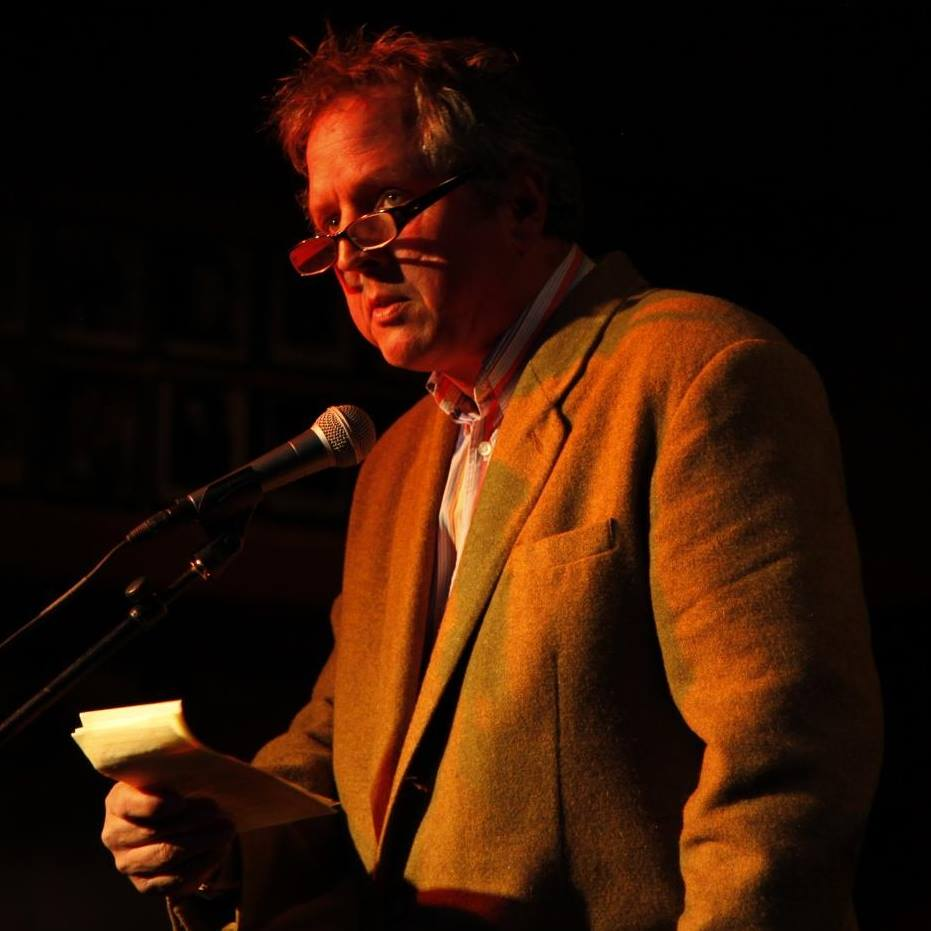
Warner in 2018

Currently, Warner is the general editor for Free State Review, a biannual literary journal founded in 2012. It is published in print and features Drama, Fiction, Nonfiction, and Poetry.

As a critic, he's reviewed books for such publications as jmww, Loch Raven Review, and Rattle; and he has reviews forthcoming at Otis Nebula, Cerise Press, Shenandoah, Fiddleback, and Chattahoochee Review.

Warner is the previous Chief of Stables at An Otherwise Perfect Farm in Upperco, Maryland. He currently lives in Aiken, South Carolina where he serves as Acquisitions Editor for Galileo Books as well as editor of Free State Review.

== Style ==
In "Barbarians at the Gate: Mark Strand, Barrett Warner, and Jorie Graham," an interview that originally appeared in the Baltimore City Paper, Warner describes himself as a confessional poet: "All confessional means to me is this...I live the poem before I write it." When writing about his own personal pain, he sees himself as both victim and perpetrator. Jenny Keith, the interviewer, describes how Warner's poetry "reflects his vigorous daily life working on a horse farm, foaling mares, pitching hay, mending fences. The poems are richly descriptive, rendering his experiences with acute realism and little if any dramatic embellishment." As Warner explains, "I can start a poem explaining how I went to the High's store and bought a carton of eggs...and there's nothing non-artistic about that. Every experience counts." Warner says that the "'beautiful forms' that poets such as Strand seek to preserve are no longer as relevant as they once were: “Nowadays, with all of the fantasies perpetuated by advertising and tabloid journalism, people are out of touch. They need reality--badly. Many years ago, if you wanted a window you went to the window maker--the glazier. Today, the guy who sells you the window has never made one. The guy that installs the window has never made one. There's this abstraction going on which is important to resist from time to time by placing the actual over the conceptual."

== Awards ==
Year	Work	Prize
2011	Walking Home from City Dock	Princemere Poetry Prize
2013	Two Hands	Liam Rector Prize
2014	Dimension	The Salamander Fiction Prize
2014	My Friend Ken Harvey	Chris Toll Memorial Prize
2014	Tanya, Tanya, Tanya	Cloudbank Poetry Prize
2015	My Thousand Year Old Disease	Tucson Festival of Books essay prize
2016	Nonfiction	MSAC Individual Artist Award (IAA)
2017	I Thought Pigeons Were Vegetarians	Luminaire Award for Best Poetry
