= Free city =

Free city may refer to:

== Historical places ==
- Free city (antiquity) a self-governed city during the Hellenistic and Roman imperial eras
- City-state, an independent sovereign city
- Free imperial city, self-governed city in the Holy Roman Empire subordinate only to the emperor
  - Free City of Augsburg, for over 500 years in what is now Germany
  - Free City of Besançon, in what is now eastern France
  - Free City of Bremen, from 1646 to 1871, with the name still officially surviving, in what is now Germany
  - Free City of Frankfurt, for almost five centuries until 1866, in what is now Germany
  - Free City of Hamburg, until 1871, with the name still officially surviving, in what is now Germany
  - Free City of Lübeck, from 1226 to 1937 in what is now Germany
- Free City of Cracow, 1815–1846, in what is now Poland
- Free City of Danzig (Napoleonic), established by Napoleon, and Free City of Danzig, created after World War I, two historical city-states that existed in what is now Gdańsk, Poland

== Other uses ==
- Free City (album), a 2001 album by the St. Lunatics
- Free City of Greyhawk, a fictional city-state
- Free City, a fictional MMO game in the 2021 film Free Guy
- The Nine Free Cities of Essos, fictional cities from the A Song of Ice and Fire book series

== See also ==
- de:Freie Stadt, literally "free city", discusses the term in its generality
- Free state (disambiguation)
- Freetown (disambiguation)
- Independent city, a city or town that does not form part of another general-purpose local government entity
- Royal free city, in the Kingdom of Hungary
- Special economic zone, an area in which the business and trade laws are different from the rest of the country
  - Free economic zone, a type of special economic zone
- Pact of Free Cities, 2019 pact between Prague, Bratislava, Warsaw, and Budapest
