= Administrative divisions of Rhode Island =

Political and administrative divisions of the state of Rhode Island

The administrative divisions of Rhode Island are the areas into which the U.S. state of Rhode Island is divided for political and administrative purposes.

== Counties ==
While Rhode Island is subdivided geographically into five counties, county government was abolished in the state in 1842. Since that time, counties in Rhode Island have had no associated governmental structures. All local government in the state is vested in its 39 municipalities. Counties are still generally used as both geographic regions and also as judicial districts.

== Cities and towns ==
The primary political subdivisions of Rhode Island are its cities and towns. New England towns are conceptually similar to civil townships in states where civil townships exist. However, they differ primarily in that New England towns are full-fledged municipal corporations. In Rhode Island, as in most of New England, the laws regulating municipal authority are very broadly construed. Thus, Rhode Island towns have the form, if not the substance, of home rule, with powers comparable to those that a city in other states would normally have.

Rhode Island state law does not distinguish between a city and a town. Cities are simply municipalities that acquired their charter through a special act of the Rhode Island General Assembly. In practice, however, all eight of Rhode Island's incorporated cities have at least 20,000 people. Any municipality (whether a city or a town) is free to adopt whatever form of government they choose.

In addition, cities and towns in Rhode Island also perform functions commonly assigned to counties in other states.

=== Powers of cities and towns ===
- Exercising police power
- Imposing property taxes on its residents
- Borrowing money and issuing tax-exempt bonds
- Acquiring, possessing, and expending the revenue
- Hiring and firing personnel
- Entering into contracts
- Initiating lawsuits
- Enacting ordinances
- Enforcing zoning regulations
- Eminent domain

=== School districts ===
With a few exceptions, the city and town governments of Rhode Island are generally responsible for education management within their jurisdiction. Twenty-nine of the thirty-nine cities/towns manage their own school systems from pre-kindergarten to high school. One city, Central Falls, is governed by a board appointed by the state board of regents. Two towns, Glocester and Foster, manage schools only through elementary school. The other seven towns, which are more rural, have joined to form regional school districts to manage their entire school system, namely, Bristol-Warren, Exeter-West Greenwich, and Charlestown-Richmond-Hopkinton. For the purposes of managing their common middle school and high school, the Foster-Glocester Regional School District has also been established.

== Legislative districts ==
The Rhode Island General Assembly consists of a Senate and a House of Representatives. The state is divided into thirty-eight senatorial districts and seventy- five representative districts. Both sets of districts are set up such that each is roughly equal in population.

== Judicial districts ==
Rhode Island is divided into four judicial districts that correspond to county groupings of towns, with the exception of Bristol County, which is part of the jurisdiction associated with Providence County.

== Special districts and agencies ==
Rhode Island has 91 special-purpose districts that have been established throughout the state for various purposes. Most such districts in the state, including fire, water, lighting, street maintenance, garbage removal, and utility districts are established by a special act of the General Assembly. There are also two county-wide water authorities (Bristol and Kent). The cities of Providence and East Providence also have urban development commissions. The Capital Center Commission in Providence manages parking, transportation, and streetscaping in downtown Providence. The East Providence Special Development District Commission manages development in the waterfront area of the city.
