= Scotland, Montgomery County, Maryland =

Community in Maryland, US

Coordinates: 39°02′26″N 77°09′33″W

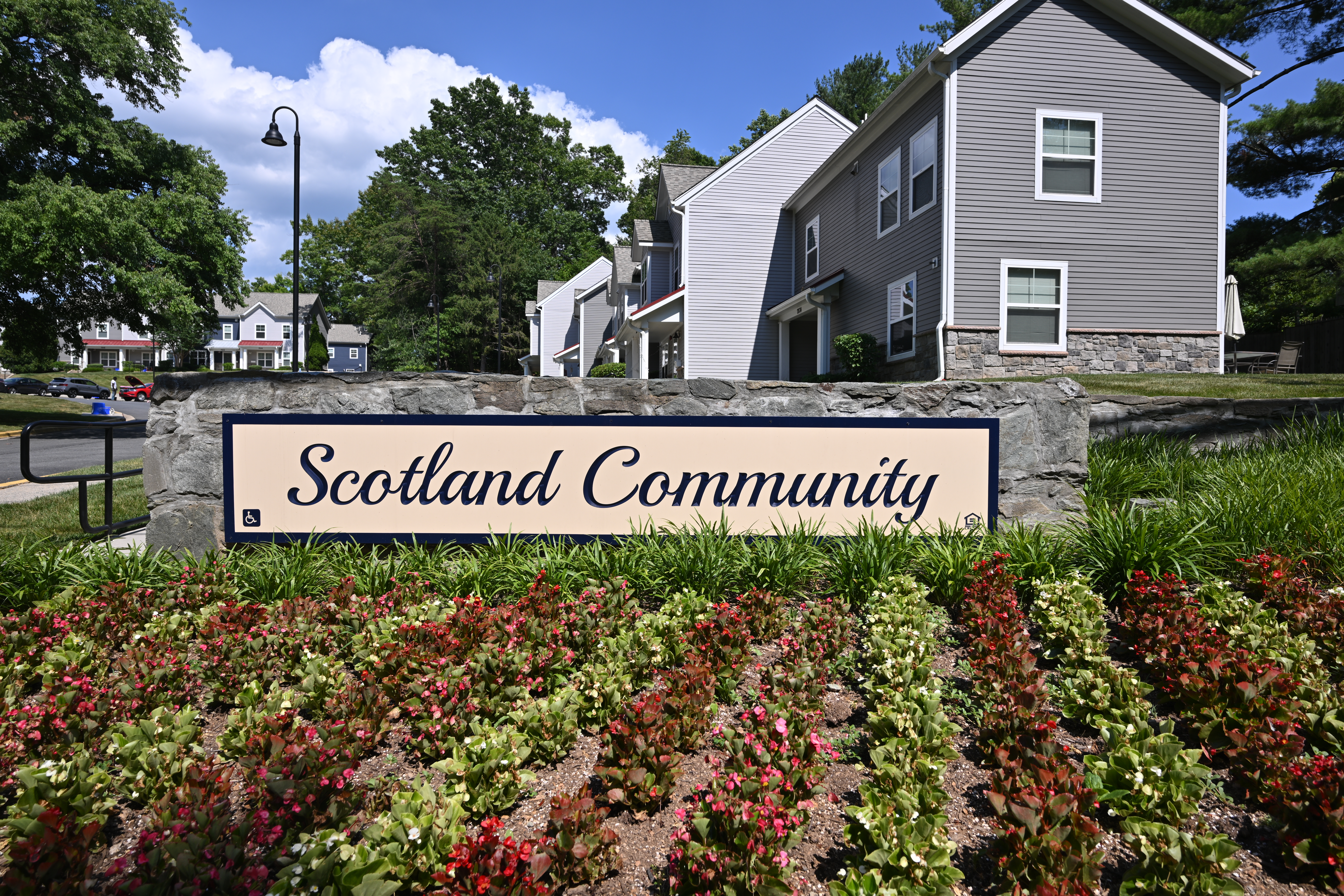
Scotland Community welcome sign, Montgomery County, MD

Scotland is a predominantly African American community in Montgomery County, Maryland, United States, located along Seven Locks Road. Consisting of 100 townhomes, Scotland community's roots date back to the late 19th century, when former slaves bought land in Potomac.

== Background ==
Beginning in the late 1870s and through the 1880s, former slaves began to take ownership of what would become the Scotland property. Two principal early families were the Masons and Doves, with descendants still living in the community. This was one of about 40 communities former slaves formed in Montgomery County. Today, these historic African American enclaves include Lincoln Park in Rockville, Ken-Gar in Kensington, Tobytown in Potomac, Stewartown and Emory Grove in Gaithersburg, and Lyttonsville in Silver Spring.

Known as "Snakes Den" until the 1920s, Scotland's approximately 50 families provided a pool of inexpensive labor for nearby farmers. With declining agriculture, many of the men of the community were laborers, drivers, trash collectors and golf caddies for wealthy whites, while women such as Geneva Mason were seamstresses, cooks, maids and baby sitters for white families in the area. In 1927, the community was strengthened with the addition of a Rosenwald School. The community continued to suffer due to segregation and discrimination even as surrounding areas began a transition from farming communities into housing and other developments. While surrounding (almost entirely) white communities were built, Scotland remained without water, electricity, and had unpaved roads into the 1960s.

In the mid-1960s, community efforts led to a 100 townhouse (75 rented, 25 privately owned) development and the institution of community self-governance which continues to this date. In 2014, the community center was renovated and in 2018 the 75 rental properties underwent a major renovation and upgrade.

== Save Our Scotland ==
As Scotland's infrastructure remained undeveloped and the housing stock deteriorated, by the early 1960s, housing and other development activities were pressuring the Scotland community. Speculators sought to buy land for potential housing developments and Montgomery County sought land to create and expand Cabin John Park.

The countryside surrounding Scotland was developed into residential subdivisions and shopping centers, leading many financially strapped residents to sell their Scotland properties to interested speculators – even when some offers came in at below-market rate.

Once stretching miles along Seven Locks Road, by 1964 the community had just 48 acres with 35 homes described as "shacks", with 23 condemned. Scotland’s 45 families had a median income of $85 a week at that time, about one-third the county's median. In fall 1964, Scotland's future "looked bleak" as the Inverness North townhouse development would pave over the stream that was the community's primary water source.

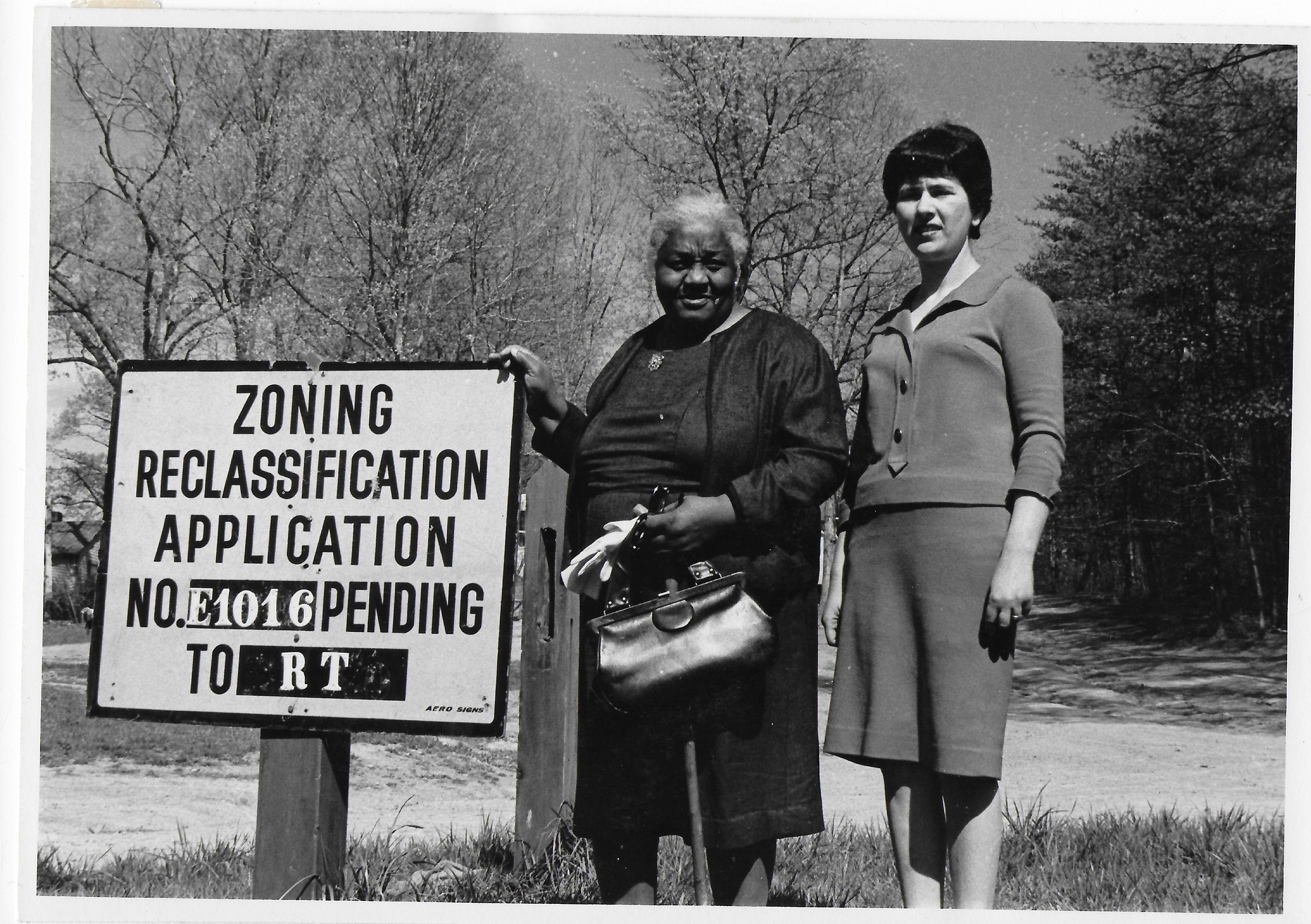
Geneva Mason (L) and Joyce Siegel (R) with Scotland zoning sign

In 1964, Joyce B. Siegel -- "a young, white Bethesda woman"—became engaged with the Scotland community.

It looked like Scotland would quietly disappear until a seemingly unimportant event occurred just before Christmas of 1964. Onto the scene came Mrs. Joyce Siegel, a housewife from nearby Bethesda, who drove up to deliver a load of toys for Scotland's children. It was Siegel's first look at the community, and she was horrified by what she saw and heard.

Siegel soon began to mobilize support across the broader Montgomery County communities to "Save Our Scotland" with a formal committee structure created in February 1965 (with Scotland residents (such as Geneva Mason and Melvin Crawford (who later became the organization's President), ministers, and Mrs. Siegel on its board of directors). Save Our Scotland built heavily on faith communities.

"We just feel that it is basically morally wrong for affluent people, real-estate operators, and others, to drive these people out of houses just because they do not have enough money and because their skin is not white." Rev. Carl Pritchett, Pastor, Bethesda Presbyterian Church, President, Save Our Scotland, 1966.

The group leveraged the human resources of the Washington, D.C., area: many current or former Federal employees volunteered their time bringing critical expertise to navigate emergent challenges in what was a rather complex set of processes over time. The question "Who owns the land" provides an excellent example of the complexity. As reported in The Evening Star,

One of the first -- and, as it turned out, the biggest problem, was that of land titles. Families who thought theyowned their land turned out to own but a small fraction of it, with long-gone relatives named in wills still having an interest. One man had paid taxes for 40 years on land he thought was his. Once a tortuous title search was completed, he found he only owned one-eighty-seventh of the plot.

To secure government grants, Scotland Community Development, Inc, formed. A $78,400 grant funded legal and other support for designing a plan for adequate housing in Scotland. The resulting plan required numerous land actions, federal Housing and Urban Development (HUD) financing, and razing the existing homes. As an indication of the complexity of the process, 26 citizens' associations were convinced to support the necessary rezoning.

After many years of extended struggle, negotiation, and planning, the Scotland Development Corporation took control of the land. The total amount of land was about 50 acres, with all but 16 acres targeted for sale to secure critical resources for construction. (Due to refusals of some partial owners of some properties to agree to the project, the project was reduced to 10 acres.)The groundbreaking was on April 21, 1968. In addition to the resources from selling 36 acres, the Corporation secured financing including a $100,000 grant under the 1965 Fair Housing Act, a $1.6M Federal government backed loan in 1967, and a final $425,000 loan in 1970 to finish the project. The completed project included 100 townhouses (25 owned and 75 rental) on ten acres finished in the late 1960s and early 1970s to replace the deteriorating existing housing stock.

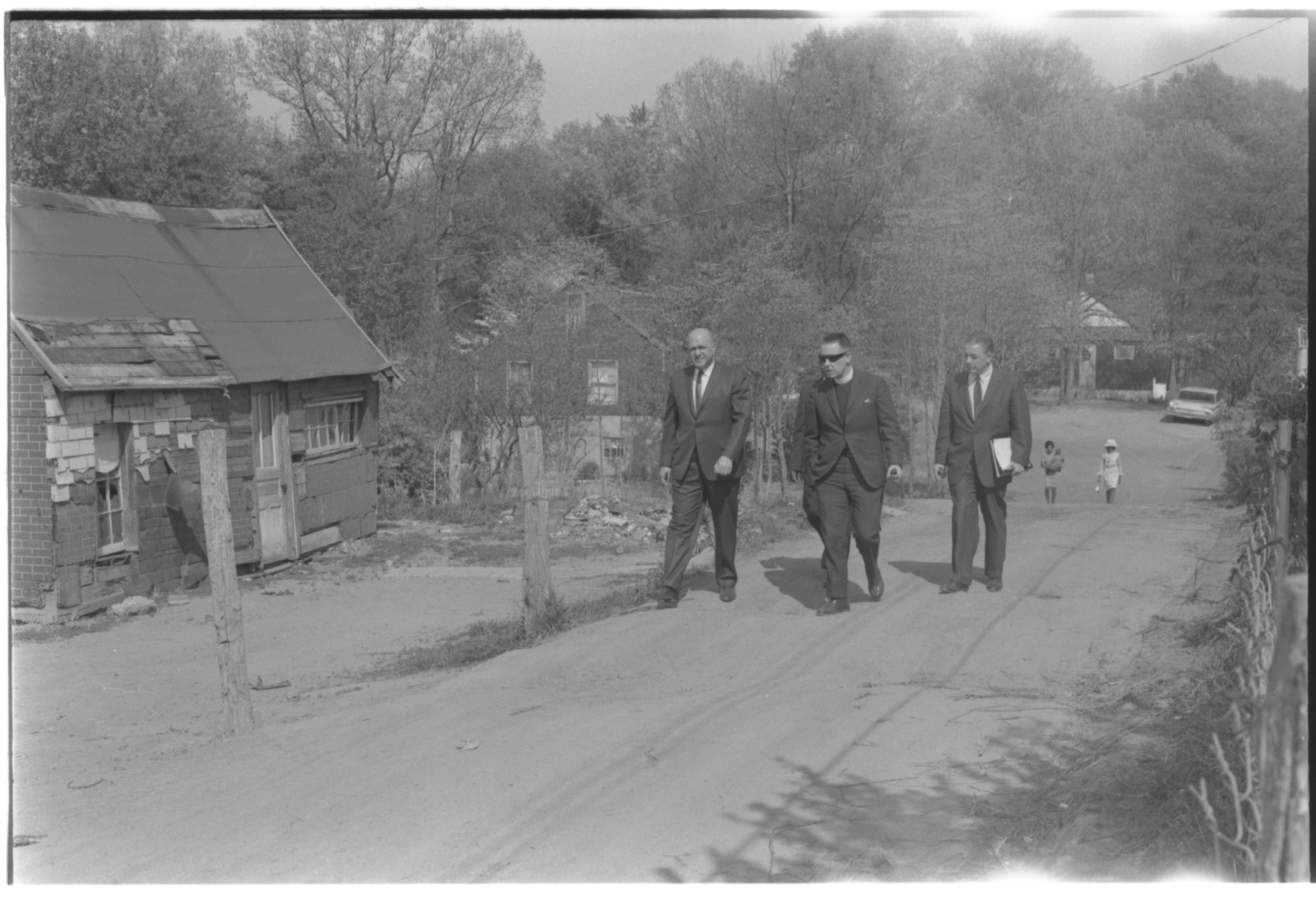
Housing and Urban Development (HUD) Secretary Robert Weaver visits Scotland

'Scotland community is an example of how a number of people and institutions - many of them incompatible only a few years ago - can involve themselves in the problems of a community and work together to solve these problems,' [U.S. Department of Housing and Urban Development Secretary Robert C.] Weaver told the gathering. The new Scotland's main road will be named after Dr. Martin Luther King Jr. [who had been assassinated on April 4, just 18 days before], with others dedicated to the late David Scull, former County Council president, and Joyce Siegel, the young Bethesda housewife who organized the original Save Our Scotland Committee three years ago."

Significant community involvement and leadership remained core through the process. For example, a community field trip to see the Reston, Virginia, development led to changes in the roofing design.

The Scotland project received national attention, both for the processes that enabled the community to retain control even as the housing stock was revitalized, and for the architecture. For example, the Architectural Forum magazine devoted a five-page spread to Scotland.

The Scotland Community Development had impacts beyond Scotland, itself. Members testified in front of the U.S. Senate committee for a rent-supplement program that had been created to help the Scotland community. Members also testified to the Maryland General Assembly for tax exemptions for housing non-profits. These still existed decades later.

Siegel's involvement with the Scotland community is documented in a forthcoming book, The Noodge, with the public release during a session as the 2026 Montgomery County History Conference. The second part of the Noodge, co-written by Joyce Siegel and Paul Tukey, highlights fifteen key individuals including Roberta Flack, Bette Thompson, Edgar (Eddie) Dove, Vaughn Holsey, and "Doc" Kapiloff.

The Scotland community, which includes a Montgomery County neighborhood community center rebuilt in 2013-14 as a LEED Gold buildingr and named for community leader Bette Carol Thompson (who died in 2016), is self-governed by the Scotland Community Civic Association. In 2018, the 75 rental units underwent a $14 million renovation program.

=== Not just about housing stock ===
The Save Our Scotland effort and the resulting external engagement sought to support the Scotland community. For example, a study hall began in the community's church basement (see for a comprehensive history of the Scotland A.M.E. Zion Church). By 1966, this was open three nights a week and half the community's school children attended each session. When this started, this was almost solely assistance from outside the community but the outside volunteers supported Scotland parents as they took over supervising the tutoring.

== Plans to Prosper You exhibit ==
In 2019, the American University Museum hosted the Plans to Prosper You summer exhibit focused on three African American communities (Tobytown, Mesopotamia, and Scotland) in Montgomery County. This exhibit included oral histories of Scotland residents, photos and background related to the Save Our Scotland activity, and memorabilia from the Scotland Eagles from the regional Negro baseball league.

== Renaming streets for Scotland community leaders ==
After extensive research and community involvement, in June 2021, the Montgomery County Council voted to rename three streets named for Confederate generals. Jeb Stuart Road and Jeb Stuart Court will be renamed in honor of Geneva Mason "who died in 1980, (and) was instrumental in the rebuilding of the Scotland neighborhood and its fight against urban renewal efforts in the 1960s" and Jubal Early Court will be renamed for William Dove who "was born into slavery and later became one of the founding members of the Scotland community. [Dove] purchased some of the first parcels of land in the neighborhood and many of his descendants still live" in the Scotland community. The streets were formally renamed on July 23, 2021.

== 2023 Juneteenth Celebration ==
In 2023, the Scotland Community held a major Juneteenth celebration included an art show, a film festival, concert and a Big Train baseball game with the players wearing Scotland Eagles jerseys. Under the guidance of Scotland resident LaTisha Gasaway, this has become an annual, Montgomery County-wide Juneteenth clebration. In 2025, with her sisters, Gasaway published a children's book, Three Sisters: The Story of Scotland, providing a window on Scotland's history from the perspective of three women who grew up there.

== Second Century Project ==
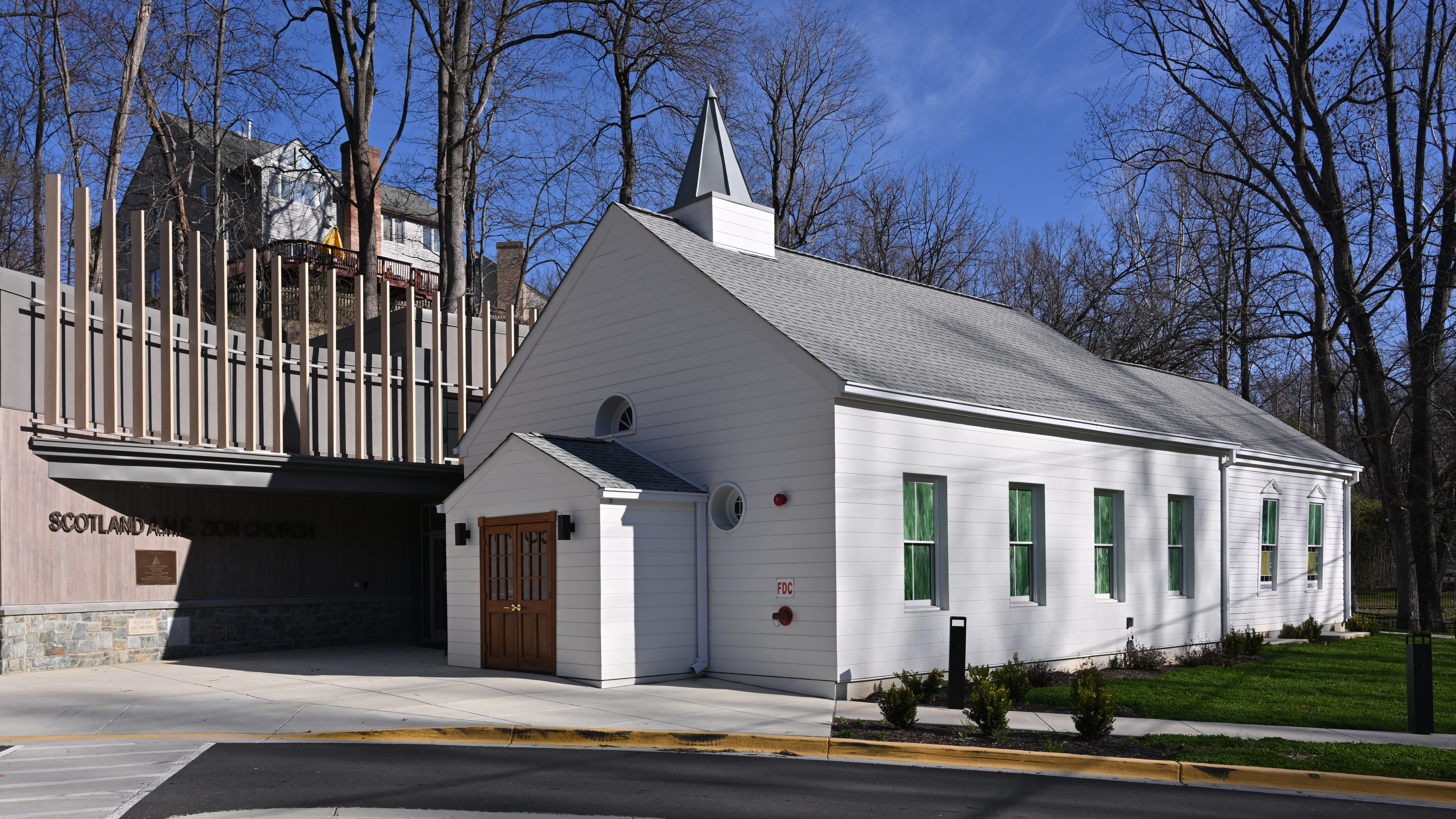
The front of Scotland AME Zion church after the Second Century Project construction

The Second Century Project is rebuilding Scotland's AME Zion Church. The Second Century Project was awarded the 2024 Legacy Award for Civic Engagement and Community Impact from the International Salute to the Life and Legacy of Dr. Martin Luther King Jr.
