= Joyce B. Siegel =

American community leader and activist

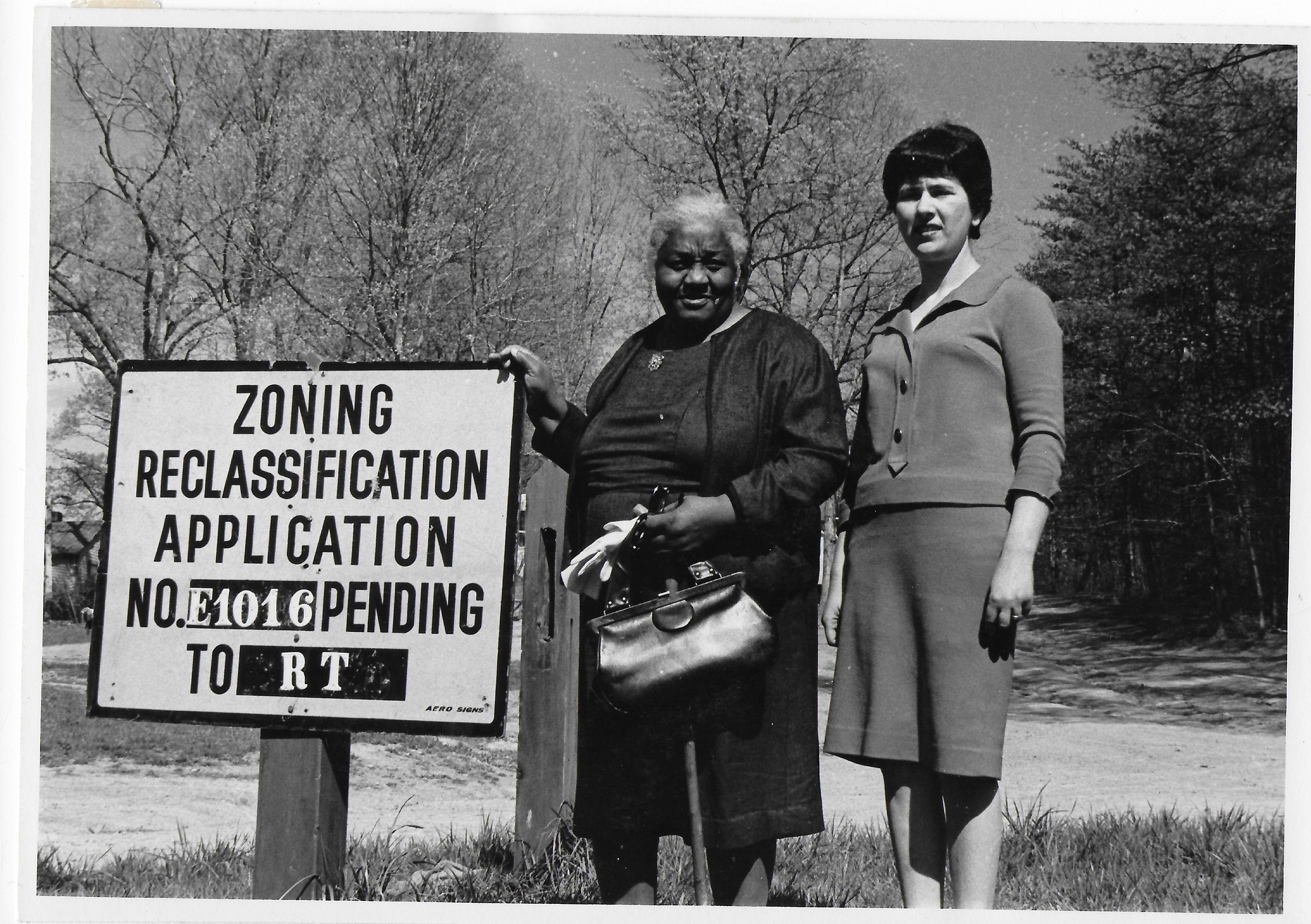
- Geneva Mason (L) and Joyce Siegel (R) commemorate key milestone in Scotland development (1969) [Photo: Alan R. Siegel, Courtesy of Montgomery History
- Born: June 28, 1933 (age 93)
- Education: University of Maryland, College Park (BA); University of Southern California (MPA)
- Occupation: Housing activist

Joyce Bernhardt Siegel (born June 28, 1933, daughter of Maurice and Ruth Bernhardt) is a Montgomery County, Maryland, community leader and activist primarily in the area of equal opportunity housing.

Siegel played a critical role in the revitalization of Maryland's Scotland community in the mid-1960s, founded and served as board member of multiple community organizations, and served as a board member of the Montgomery County Housing Opportunities Commission (HOC). She worked as a Head Start teacher, on the Sentinel newspapers staff (and created its Newspaper in the Classroom program), and on the HOC staff. She attended Smith College and Towson State College. She has a Master of Public Administration degree from the University of Southern California (USC) and a BA in American Studies from the University of Maryland, College Park. She is married to Alan R. Siegel and has three grown children, eight grandchildren, and two great grandchildren.

== Scotland Community ==
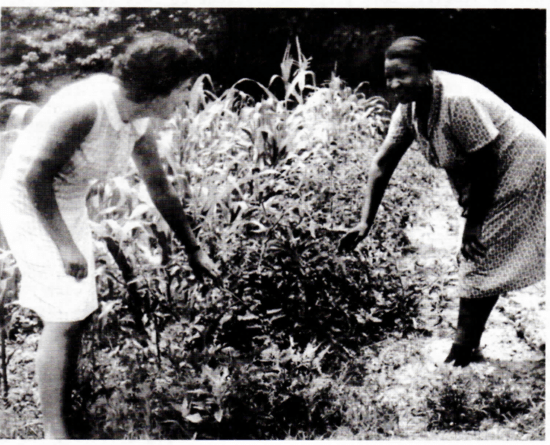
Joyce Siegel (l) at Scotland, 1965 (Photo by Alan R. Siegel, Courtesy of Maryland History)

Soon after moving to Bethesda, Maryland in 1962, Siegel became aware of the Black community of Scotland along Seven Locks Road in Potomac, Maryland. Formed by former slaves in the 1880s, Scotland continued to suffer from segregation and lack of public services (no sewage, running water, trash collection). The housing stock was in poor shape (with the majority of buildings condemned by the county). Land speculators, with increasing housing developments, were seeking to buy out Scotland's residents. And, the county was creating and expanding Cabin John Regional Park and sought Scotland community land. In fall 1964, Scotland's future "looked bleak" as the Inverness North townhouse development would pave over the stream that was the community's primary water source.

It looked like Scotland would quietly disappear until a seemingly unimportant event occurred just before Christmas of 1964. Onto the scene came Mrs. Joyce Siegel, a housewife from nearby Bethesda, who drove up to deliver a load of toys for Scotland's children. It was Siegel's first look at the community, and she was horrified by what she saw and heard.

Outraged at the evident discrimination against the community and its residents, Siegel looked for ways to engage and support Scotland. This began with efforts to help secure water and sewage services. Challenges and learning in this process were illustrative of the battles and education in the effort to enable the Scotland community to protect its future. Land titles were not clear throughout the community, with uncertain legal status for some homes. The Washington Suburban Sanitary Commission required clear title records as a prerequisite for providing sewage service and thus wouldn't provide Scotland water services. As well, Siegel built an understanding of the need for broader set of solutions.

"Sewer and water lines aren't the full answer. The present houses won't support them."

As this process went on, Siegel worked to mobilize a broader community to assist Scotland residents. She formed "Save Our Scotland" and a formal committee structure created in February 1965 (with Scotland residents (such as Geneva Mason), ministers, and Siegel on its board of directors). Save Our Scotland built heavily on faith communities.

"We just feel that it is basically morally wrong for affluent people, real-estate operators, and others, to drive these people out of houses just because they do not have enough money and because their skin is not white." Rev. Carl Pritchett, Pastor, Bethesda Presbyterian Church, President, Save Our Scotland, 1966

The group leveraged the human resources of the Washington, D.C., area: many current or former Federal employees volunteered their time bringing critical expertise to navigate emergent challenges in what was a rather complex set of processes over time.

After many years of extended struggle, negotiation, and planning, the Scotland Development Corporation took control of land and built 100 townhouses (25 owned and 75 rental) on ten acres in the late 1960s and early 1970s to replace the deteriorating existing housing stock.

'Scotland community is an example of how a number of people and institutions - many of them incompatible only a few years ago - can involve themselves in the problems of a community and work together to solve these problems,' U.S. Department of Housing and Urban Development Secretary Robert C. Weaver told the gathering. The new Scotland's main road will be named after Dr. Martin Luther King Jr. [who had been assassinated on April 4, just 18 days before], with others dedicated to the late David Scull, former County Council president, and Joyce Siegel, the young Bethesda housewife who organized the original Save Our Scotland Committee three years ago." [1968 article quoted in ]

The Scotland Community Development had impacts beyond Scotland itself. Members testified in front of the United States Senate committee for a rent-supplement program that had been created to help the Scotland community. Members also testified to the Maryland General Assembly for tax exemptions for housing non-profits. These still existed decades later.

Siegel's involvement with the Scotland community is documented in a forthcoming book, The Noodge, with the public release during a session at the 2026 Montgomery County History Conference.

=== Not just about housing stock ===
The Save Our Scotland effort and the resulting external engagement sought to support the Scotland community. For example, Siegel helped formed and participated in tutoring in the community's church basement. By 1966, this was open three nights a week and half the community's school children attended each session. When this started, this was almost solely assistance from outside the community but the outside volunteers supported Scotland parents as they took over supervising the tutoring.

== Housing Opportunities Commission (HOC) and broader housing policy ==
Siegel's work on Scotland led to her having a recognized leadership in housing equity issues within Montgomery County and across the country. She supported adoption by Montgomery County of zoning regulations requiring developers to set aside a share of their units for low-income tenants (with the County having the right to buy up to one-third of such units).

"We saw the segregation," said Joyce Siegel, county housing commissioner at the time. "It was a fairness issue — that one part of the county wasn't going to have more affordable housing than another. We had to be fair."

While it took seven years to get the legislation passed and signed by the County Executive, "Montgomery County's law was the first such zoning ordinance in the country, and it has spurred construction of more than 13,000 affordable housing units tucked into some of the county's most exclusive zip codes."

Siegel was appointed as a commissioner of HOC in 1969. She resigned that position at the request of its director, Bernie Tetrault, to become HOC's community relations officer. In her time at HOC, Siegel was involved in many of the developing initiatives to better strengthen and enable better quality and greater availability of low-income (public) housing in Montgomery County and nationwide. For example, she fostered the first tax-equity swap that led to taxable entities providing financing for public housing developments.

As discussed in the New York Times, Siegel played a role in the development of the Moderately Priced Dwelling Units (MPDU) program. The MPDU program allows developers to build with higher density with a requirement "that a percentage of housing units in residential developments be made available for low- and moderate-income households".

== Other community leadership and engagement ==
Siegel created the West Fernwood Civic Association in 1962. She served as president of the Interfaith Housing Coalition.

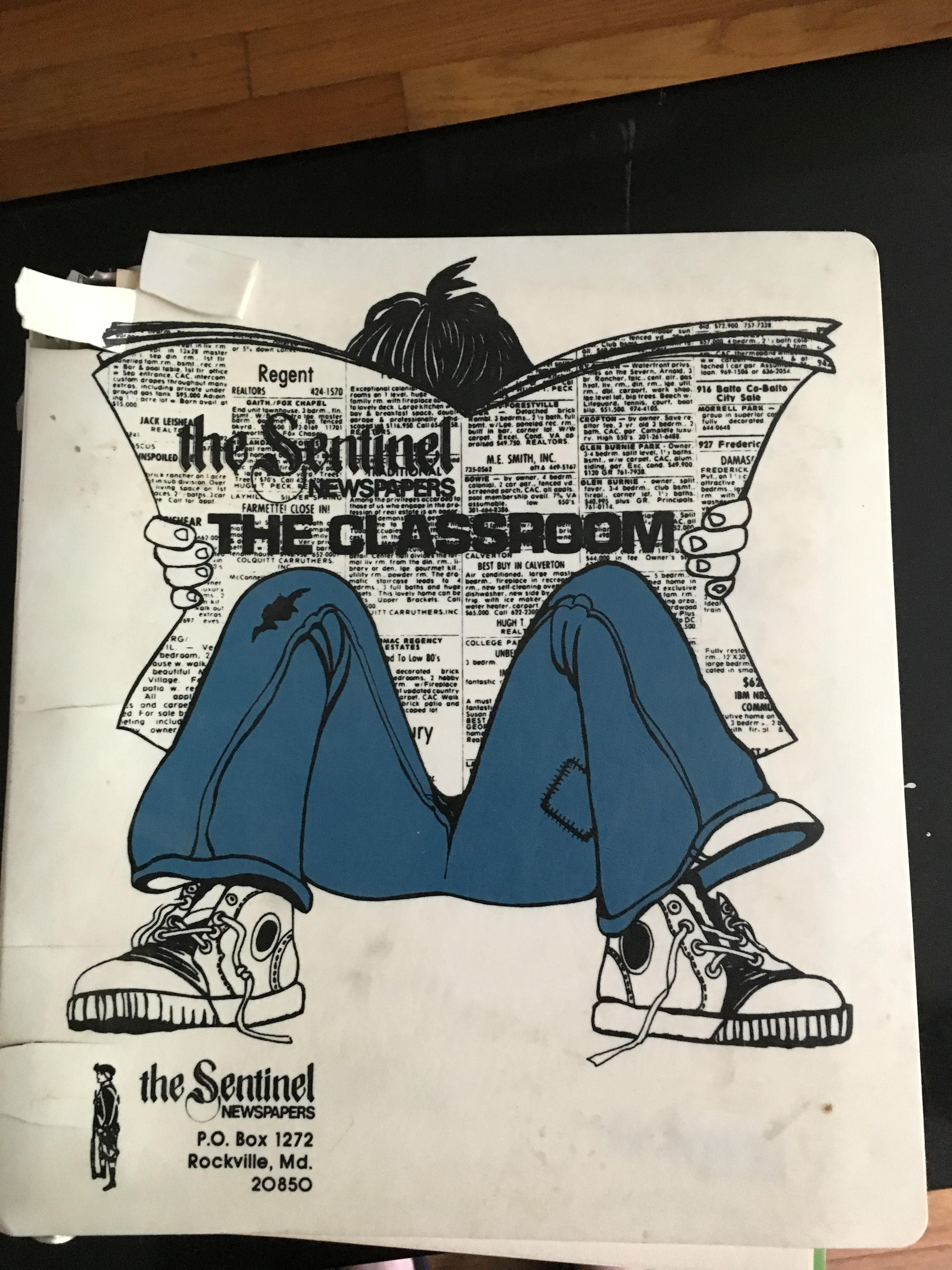
The Sentinel Newspapers in the Classroom

Siegel played a key role in the creation of and has served as chair of the Bernie Scholarship which supports residents of Montgomery County public housing pay for college education or vocational training. This was established in honor of Bernard Tetreault, who served for 24 years as HOC's executive director.

From 2009 to 2012, she served on the Forum condominium board where she focused on boosting the association's energy efficiency. As with Scotland, she has leveraged the challenges of and learning in this process to impact energy policy in Montgomery County and in Maryland. This work, primarily focused on issues related to master-metered buildings, led to a 2013 award from the Maryland Clean Energy Center.

== Career ==
Siegel was a Head Start teacher early in the program's years.

She worked for the Montgomery County Sentinel where she created its Newspaper in the Classroom program and, in 1977, published The Sentinel Newspaper in the Classroom.

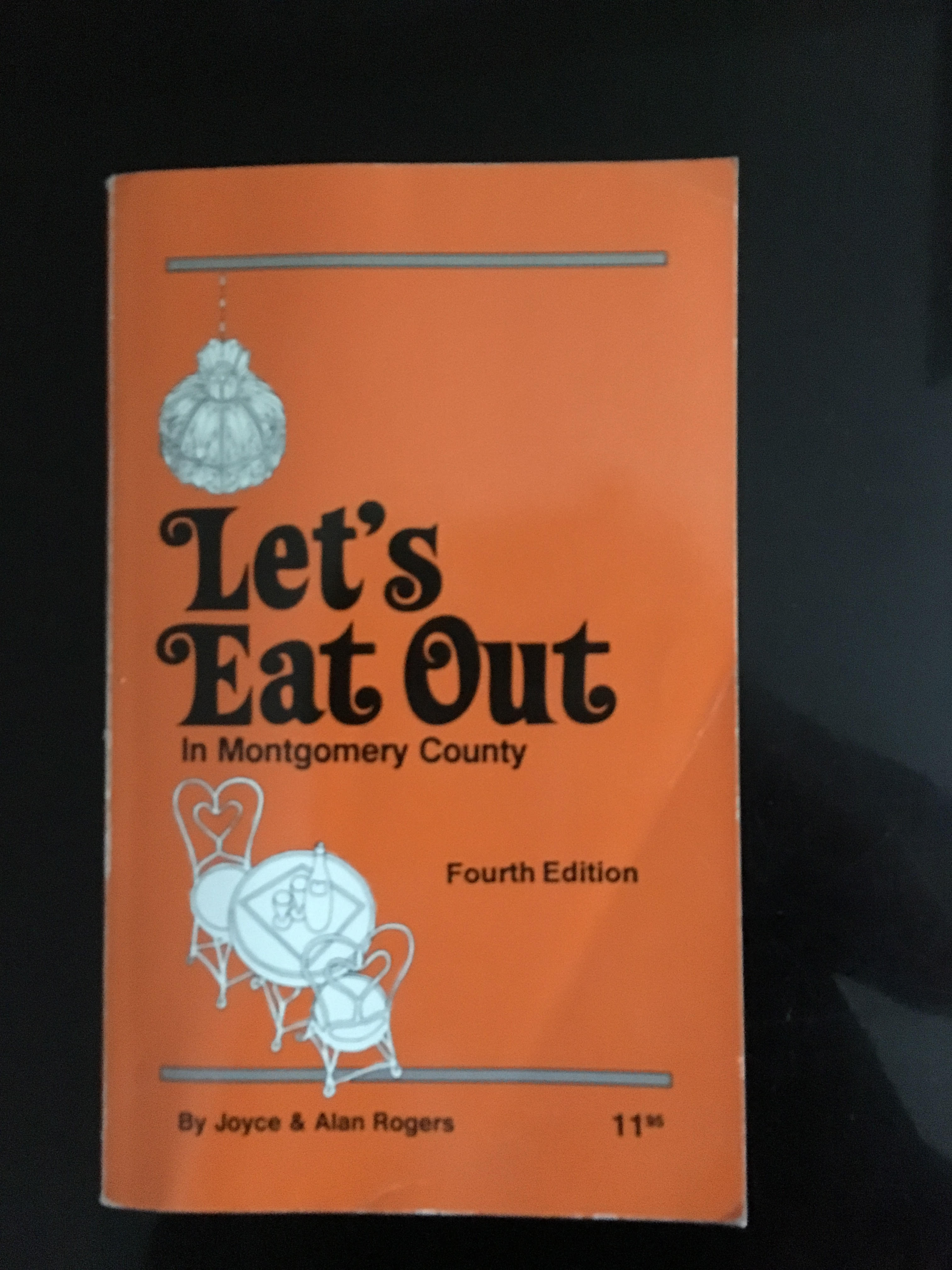
Let's Eat Out in Montgomery County, Fourth Edition, 1997

Scotland project experiences and broader efforts to boost housing equity led to Siegel's appointment as a board member of the Montgomery County Housing Opportunities Commission (HOC). She resigned that position when asked to become HOC's Public Information Officer.

For several decades, under the nom-de-plumes Joyce and Alan Rogers, the Siegels did restaurant reviews for several Washington, DC, local newspapers. From this, they published four editions of Let's Eat Out, Montgomery County.

== Awards and recognitions ==
- Roscoe C. Nix Distinguished Community Leadership Award, Montgomery Serves Awards, 2024

Joyce Siegel, a community leader and activist, has shown deep commitment to volunteer service in Montgomery County with a focus on equal rights and fair housing. She founded the West Fernwood Civic Association and played a significant role in revitalizing Montgomery County's Scotland Community. Joyce worked tirelessly to improve living conditions and access to affordable housing for the historically poor Scotland community.

- Local Writer's Showcase, Bethesday, Maryland, 2026, First Prize Essay
- Montgomery County human rights service, 2013

"Ms. Joyce Siegel has boldly stepped forward to speak for the rights of low and moderate-income citizens. For more than thirty years, Ms. Siegel has fought tirelessly to obtain decent, affordable housing for all people. It all began about thirty years ago when Joyce drove past the Scotland community. She noticed that the houses were in horrible condition and the infrastructure of the community was in disrepair. The deplorable conditions that existed for some in our highly affluent county deeply distressed her. Ms. Siegel inquired about the neighborhood and rallied other community leaders. Her ripple of hope created a current that moved the County to refurbish the area, build a community center and improve the lot of the children. Joyce joined the Housing Opportunity Commission (HOC) as Director of Public Affairs. She devoted many years to procure land and finance low to moderately priced housing construction. She also met with neighborhood groups to gain support for affordable housing and to explain the County's Moderately Priced Dwelling Units (MDPU) policies & the concept of "scattered site housing." Ms. Siegel remained focused on her vision in the face of cynicism, insult and opposition. Joyce served the board of Community Ministries for several years and currently serves its council as a housing advisor. Ms. Siegel also chairs the Interfaith Housing Coalition, an organization that purchases transitional housing and counsels underprivileged families."

- Montgomery County Neal Potter Lifetime Service Award (video of event)

"When Joyce Siegel moved to Montgomery County in 1962, she started the West Fernwood Civic Association. The Association was about a mile from the historically poor Scotland community. She saw that Scotland homes lacked running water, sewer and trash collection and were overcrowded. Joyce became a member of Suburban Maryland Fair Housing and the League of Women Voters Housing Committee to address these housing issues. She went to area churches, and talked to clergy and community members about Scotland’s living conditions. It took almost 5 years to get Scotland 100 affordable homes. Joyce helped organize a Citizen’s Human Relations Commission to work on equal access issues for minorities which was the catalyst for the County to establish the County Human Relations Commission. Joyce was also a member and President of the Interfaith Housing Coalition and has served as co-founder and Board member of The Bernie Scholarship Awards Program."

- Scotland Community 90th Birthday Celebration: On June 18, 2023, the Scotland community hosted a birthday celebration, with numerous Scotland community and Montgomery County leadership speakers, to honor Joyce Siegel on her 90th birthday. “Joyce’s contributions are the reason that there is a Scotland today,” said LaTisha Gasaway-Paul, organizer of the birthday celebration, in an email. “With how much pushback we were receiving at that time who’s to say what Scotland would be or wouldn’t be today if it weren’t for Joyce calling out the unfairness that we were receiving. We have so much to thank her for and that is why we are so honored to celebrate her and all her accomplishments.”
- Smith College Medal, 1970
- Maryland Clean Energy, 2013
- Montgomery County Board of Realtors "Make America Better" Award, 1969
- "Community Service Award," Washington Chapter of the National Conference of Christians and Jews, 1970
