= Lincoln Park, Rockville, Maryland =

Community in Maryland, US

Coordinates: 39°5′40″N 77°8′42″W

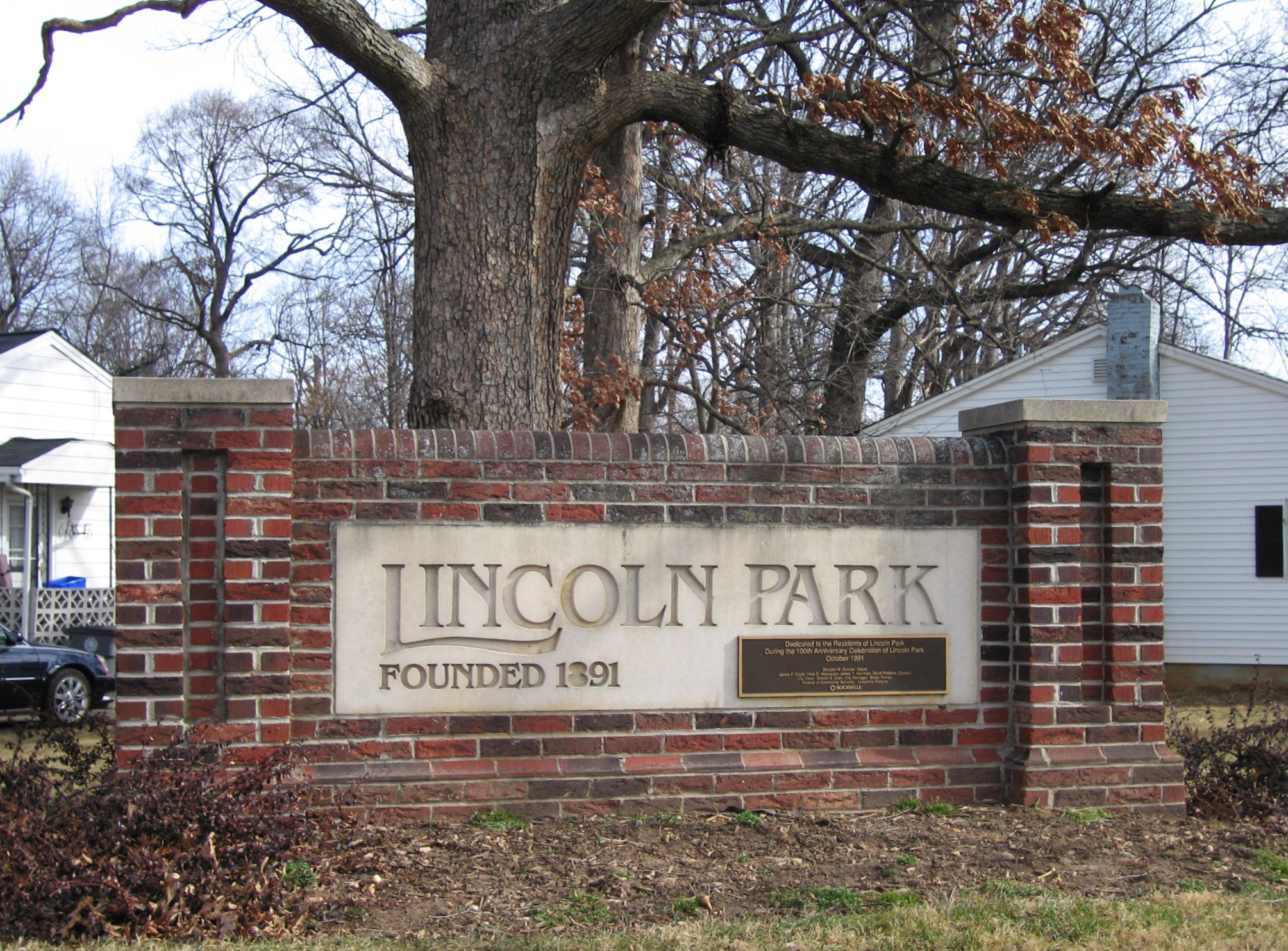
Lincoln Park sign

Lincoln Park is an African-American neighborhood in Rockville, Maryland, east of the B&O Railroad tracks. Most high-school-aged residents of the Lincoln Park attend Richard Montgomery High School. Its local community center has aimed to help those in the area.

== Background ==
Lincoln Park was established in the late 1890s, one of the first real estate ventures in Montgomery County intended for sale to Black people. Other African American communities in the county generally traced their origins to a gift, perhaps from a former slave owner, or purchase of land by freed slaves after the U.S. Civil War.

About 40 communities in Montgomery County were settled by freed slaves in the 19th century. Today, these historic African American enclaves include Ken-Gar in Kensington, Scotland and Tobytown in Potomac, Stewartown and Emory Grove in Gaithersburg, and Lyttonsville in Silver Spring.

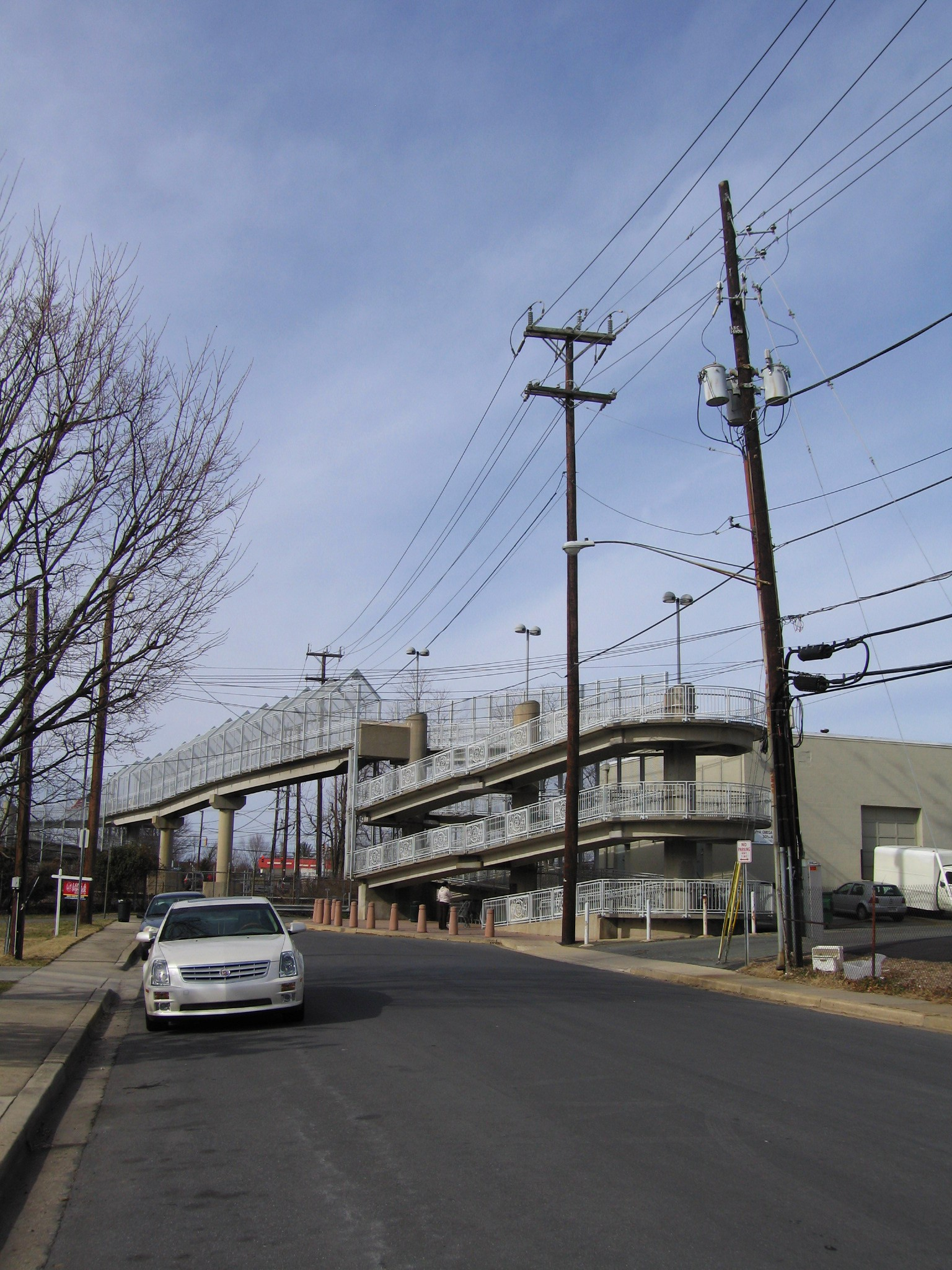
Unity Bridge, formerly known as the Frederick Avenue Pedestrian Bridge, connecting the community of Lincoln Park to the town center in Rockville, Maryland

Lincoln Park’s origins differ from those of earlier African American communities in the county. Many of the initial homebuyers were related to one another either by blood or by marriage. Residents like the Sheltons, the Summerours, Hills and Prathers have maintained strong kinship and community ties for three, four and five generations. Descendants of many original homeowners still live there.

Today, Lincoln Park comprises approximately 320 households and is characterized as a low-to-moderate income community. It maintains a small-town atmosphere within Rockville, and the Legacy development stands as a significant factor in its ongoing revitalization and transformation. Rockville Housing Enterprises (the city's public housing agency) owned sixty units of "affordable housing" in Lincoln Park, and had sold fifty-six of them by 2009. A homeowners association was expected to be formed and if an owner wants to sell in less than 30 years, Rockville Housing Enterprises has the right to buy the unit and then re-sell it at a below-market rate.
