= List of reality programs formerly distributed by American Public Television =

The following is a list of reality programs formerly distributed to public television stations (including PBS affiliates) through American Public Television. There is a separate list for current, upcoming and unreleased programming.

Legend
^{APT WORLDWIDE}	Also on APT Worldwide
^{CREATE}	Also on Create
^{HDTV}	High-definition television
^{ITVS}	Funded and distributed by Independent Television Service
^{LPB}	Funded and distributed by Latino Public Broadcasting
^{NHK}	Funded and distributed by NHK (Japan Broadcasting Corporation)
^{VMM}	Funded and distributed by Vision Maker Media (formerly Native American Public Broadcasting Consortium and Native American Public Telecommunications)
^{WORLD}	Also on WORLD

== Reality series ==
=== How-to ===
==== 1970s ====
Title	Premiere date	End date	How to	Note(s)	Legend(s)	Source(s)
Lap Quilting with Georgia Bonesteel	December 29, 1979	April 6, 2017	N/A		^{CREATE}	

==== 1980s ====
Title	Premiere date	End date	How to	Note(s)	Legend(s)	Source(s)
Computer Chronicles	June 3, 1982	November 24, 2002	N/A	(Note: Formerly known as The Computer Chronicles.)		
Yan Can Cook	July 1, 1982	October 31, 2002	N/A			
Quilt Fever	March 1, 1983	February 28, 1985	N/A			
Wildlife Woodcarvers	October 20, 1983	October 19, 1989	N/A			
Academy on Computers	January 22, 1984	February 21, 1985	N/A			
The World of Cartooning with Mike Peters	January 31, 1985	January 30, 1989	N/A			
Rod & Reel Streamside	March 20, 1986	June 30, 2002	N/A			
New Southern Cooking with Nathalie Dupree	October 1, 1986	November 30, 1991	N/A			
Welcome to My Studio	December 20, 1986	December 24, 2020	Painting	(Note: Formerly known as Welcome to My Studio with Helen Van Wyk.)	^{CREATE}	
Sit and Be Fit	September 1, 1987	May 31, 2004	N/A	(Note: Now distributed by NETA (aka National Educational Telecommunications Association).)		
Amish Cooking from Quilt Country	September 4, 1989	August 31, 1993	Cooking			
Amish Cooking from Quilt Country	October 11, 1998	July 2, 2002	Cooking			

==== 1990s ====
Title	Premiere date	End date	How to	Note(s)	Legend(s)	Source(s)
Nathalie Dupree's Matters of Taste	April 1, 1990	March 31, 1993	N/A			
Jenkins' Art Workshop	October 1, 1990	October 1, 2002	N/A			
Burt Wolf: Eating Well	August 2, 1992	August 1, 1997	N/A			
American Woodshop	October 8, 1992	December 19, 2007	Home improvement		^{CREATE}	
Trailside: Make Your Own Adventure	July 4, 1993	January 15, 2002	N/A	(Note: Seasons 1-7 only.) (Note: Distributed by NETA (aka National Educational Telecommunications Association) in seasons 8 and 9.)		
MotorWeek	September 11, 1993	September 12, 1998	N/A	(Note: Seasons 13-17 only.)		
Getting the Love You Want: A Guide for Couples	February 14, 1994	February 13, 2000	N/A			
Hawaii Cooks with Roy Yamaguchi	July 2, 1994	April 4, 2005	Cooking			
Burt Wolf's Chocolate Special	August 20, 1994	August 31, 1999	N/A	(Note: Two-part series.)		
Fresh Paint	September 17, 1994	September 13, 2003	Home improvement			
Marcia Adams' Kitchen	October 1, 1994	September 30, 2004	Cooking			
T'ai Chi Chih: Joy Thru Movement	October 2, 1994	October 1, 1997	N/A			
Cucina Amore	January 11, 1995	January 7, 2000	N/A	(Note: Now distributed by PBS.)		
Scheewe Art Workshop	May 1, 1995	April 3, 2018	Painting		^{CREATE}	
Tai Chi: Innerwave	October 1, 1995	September 30, 1998	N/A			
Tai Chi: Innerwave	February 1, 1999	January 31, 2002	N/A			
Country Inn Cooking with Gail Greco	October 1, 1995	September 30, 2000	N/A			
T'ai Chi in Paradise	November 4, 1995	November 3, 1998	N/A			
Mollie Katzen's Cooking Show	December 1, 1995	October 6, 2004	Cooking		^{APT WORLDWIDE}	
Finding Financial Freedom... with Jonathan Pond	December 1, 1995	April 1, 2000	N/A			
Chef Paul Prudhomme's Fiery Foods	January 1, 1996	December 31, 1998	N/A			
Sweet Romance: A Country Inn Cooking Special	February 18, 1996	March 31, 1998	N/A			
Jancis Robinson's Wine Course	April 1, 1996	June 30, 2008	N/A			
The Artists' World	April 24, 1996	April 13, 2002	N/A			
Cooking with Caprial: American Bistro Fare	May 1, 1996	April 30, 2001	N/A			
The Best of Jenkins' Art Workshop	May 1, 1996	July 11, 1999	N/A			
Burt Wolf's Gatherings & Celebrations	August 31, 1996	August 30, 2003	N/A	(Note: Originally travel genre.)		
Debbi Fields' Great American Desserts	September 1, 1996	August 31, 1999	N/A			
Parenting Works!	September 1, 1996	August 31, 1999	N/A			
Net Cafe	October 2, 1996	December 6, 2002	N/A	(Note: Formerly known as The Internet Café.)		
Tommy Tang's Modern Thai Cuisine	October 19, 1996	September 30, 2003	Cooking			
New American Cuisine	November 1, 1996	October 31, 1998	N/A			
Cooking with Caprial Holiday Special	November 8, 1996	November 6, 2000	N/A			
Andrew Weil, M.D. Package	December 1, 1996	March 31, 2000	N/A	(Note: This package includes Spontaneous Healing and Eight Weeks to Optimum Health.)		
Donna's Day	February 2, 1997	February 7, 2001	N/A	(Note: Seasons 1 and 2 only.)		
Your Financial Future with Jonathan Pond	March 2, 1997	April 1, 2000	N/A			
Chef George Hirsch's Know Your Fire	March 16, 1997	August 31, 2000	N/A			
Parenting Puzzle	March 30, 1997	March 29, 2000	N/A			
Paint! The Van Wyk Way	April 1, 1997	April 6, 2001	N/A			
At Garden's Gate	August 16, 1997	September 3, 2005	Gardening			
Yan Can Cook: The Best of Asia	October 1, 1997	September 30, 2000	N/A			
Little Italy with David Ruggerio	October 1, 1997	September 30, 2000	N/A			
Debbie Travis' Painted House	October 3, 1997	October 14, 2002	N/A	(Note: Seasons 1-3 only.)		
Now You're Cooking	November 9, 1997	October 31, 2001	N/A			
Digital Duo	November 9, 1997	March 25, 2002	N/A	(Note: Music & entertainment genre in seasons 1-3.)		
Dessert Circus with Jacques Torres	January 1, 1998	February 10, 2001	N/A			
Incredible Cuisine with Chef Jean Pierre	January 12, 1998	July 16, 2000	N/A			
Christina Cooks	February 1, 1998	March 31, 2018	Cooking		^{APT WORLDWIDE}^{CREATE}	
New Tastes from Texas with Chef Stephan Pyles	March 21, 1998	March 20, 2007	Cooking	(Note: Originally titled New Texas Cuisine.)		
Adam Smith's Money Game	April 18, 1998	January 1, 1999	N/A			
Good Grief	May 1, 1998	April 30, 2006	Self help			
Great Food	May 9, 1998	May 8, 2000	N/A			
Cooking In with Todd English	June 1, 1998	April 30, 2002	N/A			
MoneyHunt	June 1, 1998	March 31, 2002	N/A			
Chesapeake Bay Cooking with John Shields	June 1, 1998	May 31, 2000	N/A			
Two Fat Ladies	September 1, 1998	October 31, 2002	N/A			
TV411	September 13, 1998	September 12, 2003	Self help			
Lidia's Italian-American Table	November 1, 1998	January 3, 2007	Cooking	(Note: Originally titled Lidia's Table.) (Note: aka Lidia's Italian Table in seasons 1-3.) (Note: Alternatively titled Lidia’s Italian Table: Italian-American Favorites in season 4.)	^{CREATE}	
TECHNO@bytes	November 1, 1998	November 30, 2000	N/A			
Justin Wilson's Easy Cookin'	November 7, 1998	November 6, 2005	Cooking			
The Kitchen Sessions with Charlie Trotter	January 2, 1999	April 2, 2007	Cooking		^{APT WORLDWIDE}	
Dr. Edward Hallowell Package	March 1, 1999	August 31, 2002	N/A	(Note: This package includes Worry: Controlling It and Using It Wisely and Only Connect.)		
Sit and Be Fit Pledge Specials	March 1, 1999	March 31, 2001	N/A			
Savor the Southwest	March 20, 1999	March 31, 2007	Cooking			
Dutch Oven and Camp Cooking	March 27, 1999	June 16, 2003	Cooking	(Note: Distributed by NETA (aka National Educational Telecommunications Association) in season 3.)		
Marcia Adams: More Cooking from Quilt Country	April 3, 1999	April 2, 2005	Cooking			
Weir Cooking in the Wine Country	April 3, 1999	December 31, 2003	Cooking			
The Boat Shop	April 3, 1999	April 2, 2002	N/A			
Art Works	April 3, 1999	April 2, 2001	N/A			
Jenkins' Art Studio	April 18, 1999	April 17, 2002	N/A			
Justin Wilson's Looking Back	May 8, 1999	May 7, 2007	Cooking			
Pets: Part of the Family	May 16, 1999	May 5, 2002	N/A		^{APT WORLDWIDE}	
Seasons of My Heart: A Culinary Journey Through Oaxaca, Mexico	September 4, 1999	September 3, 2017	Cooking			
Julia and Jacques Cooking at Home	September 25, 1999	September 24, 2001	Cooking		^{CREATE}	
Julia and Jacques Cooking at Home	August 1, 2002	September 30, 2002	Cooking		^{CREATE}	
Julia and Jacques Cooking at Home	April 5, 2003	April 4, 2005	Cooking		^{CREATE}	

==== 2000s ====
Title	Premiere date	End date	How to	Note(s)	Legend(s)	Source(s)
Cut Up & Cook	January 1, 2000	December 31, 2005	Cooking			
Parenting Puzzle: The Middle Years	March 5, 2000	March 4, 2002	N/A			
The Artists Workshop	March 18, 2000	March 17, 2003	N/A		^{APT WORLDWIDE}	
Season by Season	May 6, 2000	May 5, 2003	Cooking	(Note: Originally titled Season by Season with Michael Chiabello.)		
Mexico: One Plate at a Time with Rick Bayless	May 20, 2000	March 31, 2021	Cooking	(Note: Originally titled Frontera Cooking.)	^{APT WORLDWIDE}^{CREATE}	
George Hirsch Living It Up!*	June 3, 2000	November 9, 2003	Self help			
Kids Healthworks	August 20, 2000	August 19, 2003	N/A	(Note: Originally science & health genre.)		
Dish It Up Italian Style	September 1, 2000	August 31, 2003	Cooking			
Nick Stellino's Family Kitchen	September 2, 2000	January 6, 2013	Cooking			
New Jewish Cuisine	September 3, 2000	August 31, 2013	Cooking	(Note: Alternatively titled New Jewish Cuisine with Jeff Nathan and Friends in season 3.)	^{APT WORLDWIDE}^{CREATE}	
Yan Can Cook: Asian Favorites	September 15, 2000	October 25, 2002	N/A			
Women of Wisdom and Power	March 1, 2001	March 31, 2004	Self help			
Women of Wisdom and Power	February 20, 2005	February 19, 2009	Self help			
How to Say No Without Feeling Guilty	March 1, 2001	March 31, 2004	Self help			
Two for Tonight	March 3, 2001	March 2, 2004	Cooking			
Jill Prescott's Ecole De Cuisine	April 7, 2001	April 6, 2007	Cooking			
Michael Chiarello's Napa	September 8, 2001	September 6, 2004	Cooking	(Note: Originally culture & lifestyle genre in season 1.) (Note: Art & culture genre in season 1.)		
¡Zarela! La Cocina Veracruzana	September 22, 2001	September 21, 2007	Cooking			
Jacques Pépin Celebrates!	October 6, 2001	November 3, 2004	Cooking			
One Stroke Painting with Donna Dewberry	January 5, 2002	January 6, 2011	Painting	(Note: Thirty-minute program.) (Note: Originally art & culture genre.)	^{CREATE}	
The Academy's World Cuisine	February 2, 2002	February 1, 2006	Cooking			
Haley's Hints Package	June 1, 2002	August 31, 2004	Home improvement	(Note: This package includes Haley's Hints and Haley's Hints Too.)		
Haley's Hints Package	September 1, 2004	August 31, 2006	Home improvement	(Note: This package includes Haley's Hints and Haley's Hints Too.)		
Haley's Hints Package	October 1, 2006	March 31, 2009	Home improvement	(Note: This package includes Haley's Hints and Haley's Hints Too.)		
Haley's Hints Package	November 29, 2013	December 31, 2015	Home improvement	(Note: This package includes Haley's Hints and Haley's Hints Too.)		
Jane Butel's Southwestern Kitchen	September 7, 2002	September 6, 2008	Cooking		^{CREATE}	
Graham Kerr's Gathering Place	October 5, 2002	April 2, 2012	Cooking			
Burt Wolf: What We Eat	October 5, 2002	October 4, 2014	Cooking		^{CREATE}	
Martin Yan's Chinatowns	October 5, 2002	September 5, 2005	Cooking		^{CREATE}	
Martin Yan's Chinatowns	September 2, 2006	September 1, 2008	Cooking		^{CREATE}	
Chefs A' Field: Culinary Adventures That Begin on the Farm	January 4, 2003	January 3, 2016	Cooking		^{CREATE}	
Barbecue America	April 5, 2003	May 25, 2011	Cooking		^{CREATE}	
Treats from the Edwardian Country	April 27, 2003	April 26, 2006	Cooking			
New Scandinavian Cooking with Andreas Viestad	May 3, 2003	July 5, 2016	Cooking		^{APT WORLDWIDE}^{CREATE}	
The Chefs of Napa Valley	May 3, 2003	May 2, 2007	Cooking		^{CREATE}	
Barbecue University with Steven Raichlen	May 18, 2003	March 31, 2018	Cooking		^{APT WORLDWIDE}^{CREATE}	
Frank Clarke Simply Painting: Beautiful Ireland in Watercolor	July 5, 2003	July 4, 2007	Painting			
Burt Wolf: Taste of Freedom	November 1, 2003	October 31, 2015	Cooking	(Note: Planned to be art & culture genre.)	^{CREATE}	
Smart Gardening	March 6, 2004	January 6, 2008	Gardening		^{CREATE}	
Flog It!	March 15, 2004	April 30, 2006	N/A			
Tommy Tang's Let's Get Cooking	April 3, 2004	March 31, 2012	Cooking			
Weir Cooking in the City	April 3, 2004	April 2, 2007	Cooking		^{CREATE}	
Caprial and John's Kitchen: Cooking for Family and Friends	April 3, 2004	June 30, 2016	Cooking		^{CREATE}	
The Grand View	April 4, 2004	September 2, 2013	Painting	(Note: Travel genre in the 1st release.)		
The Grand View	February 7, 2015	February 6, 2017	Painting	(Note: Travel genre in the 1st release.)		
Double Happiness	May 1, 2004	April 30, 2007	Cooking		^{CREATE}	
LifeSteps with Michael Pritchard	August 29, 2004	August 28, 2010	Self help			
Martin Yan Quick & Easy	September 4, 2004	September 2, 2007	Cooking	(Note: Originally titled Martin Yan's Quick & Easy Asian.)	^{CREATE}	
Jacques Pépin: Fast Food My Way	October 2, 2004	October 1, 2007	Cooking	(Note: Originally titled Jacques Pépin: My Fast Food.)	^{CREATE}	
Art of Food with Wendy Brodie	October 2, 2004	October 1, 2016	Cooking			
Wine, Food & Friends with Karen MacNeil with Cooking Light	October 2, 2004	October 1, 2007	Cooking		^{APT WORLDWIDE}^{CREATE}	
Gary Spetz's Painting Wild Places	January 1, 2005	March 21, 2016	Painting	(Note: aka Gary Spetz's Painting Wild Places with Watercolors in seasons 1-4.)	^{CREATE}	
American Homeshop with Suzy & Scott Phillips	March 26, 2005	April 7, 2008	Home improvement	(Note: aka American Homeshop in season 1.)		
Lidia's Family Table	April 2, 2005	December 31, 2008	Cooking		^{APT WORLDWIDE}^{CREATE}	
The Best of Simply Painting: Across the United States	April 2, 2005	April 1, 2009	Painting	(Note: Season 2 only.) (Note: Season 1 was planned to premiered April 2, 2005.)		
Daisy Cooks! with Daisy Martinez	April 2, 2005	August 31, 2011	Cooking	(Note: Originally titled Hola, Daisy!.)	^{CREATE}	
Zonya's Health Bites	April 2, 2005	April 6, 2019	Cooking			
How to Cook Everything: Bittman Takes on America's Chefs	April 2, 2005	April 1, 2009	Cooking		^{APT WORLDWIDE}^{CREATE}	
Low Carb Cookworx	April 2, 2005	April 1, 2009	Cooking			
Garden RX	June 1, 2005	August 31, 2007	Gardening	(Note: Four-part series.)		
New Scandinavian Cooking with Tina Nordström	September 3, 2005	September 2, 2016	Cooking		^{APT WORLDWIDE}^{CREATE}	
In the Studio with Priscilla Hauser	September 3, 2005	September 2, 2009	Painting			
Coastal Cooking with John Shields	September 10, 2005	December 31, 2014	Cooking		^{CREATE}	
The Best of Scheewe Art Workshop	October 1, 2005	September 30, 2008	Painting			
The Best of Scheewe Art Workshop	November 1, 2008	October 31, 2011	Painting			
Boomers! Redefining Life After Fifty	January 1, 2006	April 23, 2008	Self help	(Note: Planned to end on December 31, 2009.)		
Cultivating Life	March 25, 2006	April 4, 2010	Gardening	(Note: Originally lifestyle genre.)	^{CREATE}	
Joanne Weir's Cooking Class	August 19, 2006	January 2, 2011	Cooking	(Note: Formerly Weir Teaches Cooking.)	^{CREATE}	
Food Trip with Todd English	January 6, 2007	May 1, 2010	Cooking		^{CREATE}	
Chef's Story	April 1, 2007	March 31, 2010	Cooking			
Painting the West with Fred Oldfield	April 7, 2007	April 6, 2010	Painting			
Painting with Anne-Marie	April 7, 2007	April 6, 2011	Painting			
The Best Recipes in the World with Mark Bittman of the New York Times	April 7, 2007	April 6, 2009	Cooking		^{APT WORLDWIDE}^{CREATE}	
Lidia's Italy	April 7, 2007	September 3, 2012	Cooking		^{APT WORLDWIDE}^{CREATE}	
The Best of Simply Painting: Across Europe	April 7, 2007	April 6, 2016	Painting			
Chefs A' Field	May 1, 2007	September 4, 2017	Cooking	(Note: aka Chefs A' Field: Kids on the Farm in season 1.)	^{CREATE}	
Chef Paul Prudhomme's Always Cooking!	May 5, 2007	May 4, 2019	Cooking			
New Scandinavian Cooking with Claus Meyer	May 5, 2007	May 4, 2016	Cooking		^{APT WORLDWIDE}^{CREATE}	
Martin Yan's China	January 5, 2008	January 4, 2010	Cooking			
Wyland's Art Studio	April 5, 2008	April 3, 2018	Painting		^{CREATE}	
The Beauty of Oil Painting with Gary and Kathwren Jenkins	April 5, 2008	April 5, 2019	Painting			
Primal Grill with Steven Raichlen	May 17, 2008	May 16, 2018	Cooking		^{APT WORLDWIDE}^{CREATE}	
Perfect Day	September 6, 2008	September 5, 2016	Cooking		^{APT WORLDWIDE}^{CREATE}	
Jacques Pépin: More Fast Food My Way	October 1, 2008	September 31, 2016	Cooking		^{CREATE}	
Nick Stellino Cooking with Friends	March 7, 2009	April 1, 2019	Cooking		^{CREATE}	
Real Families, Real Answers	April 5, 2009	April 4, 2017	Self help			
Avec Eric	September 5, 2009	September 30, 2011	Cooking			
Tommy Tang's Easy Thai Cooking	September 26, 2009	September 25, 2012	Cooking			

==== 2010s ====
Title	Premiere date	End date	How to	Note(s)	Legend(s)	Source(s)
Rachel's Favorite Food at Home	May 1, 2010	April 30, 2013	Cooking			
P. Allen Smith's Garden to Table	April 2, 2011	April 6, 2016	Cooking		^{CREATE}	
Chef John Besh's New Orleans	April 2, 2011	April 1, 2017	Cooking			
Rachel's Favorite Food for Living	May 7, 2011	May 6, 2017	Cooking			
Cuisine Culture	September 3, 2011	September 2, 2013	Cooking			
Essential Pépin	October 15, 2011	October 14, 2017	Cooking		^{CREATE}	
Joanne Weir's Cooking Confidence	January 7, 2012	January 6, 2018	Cooking		^{CREATE}	
Clodagh's Irish Food Trails	May 5, 2012	May 4, 2015	Cooking			
Christina	October 6, 2012	October 5, 2018	Cooking		^{CREATE}	
Cooking with Nick Stellino	April 6, 2013	June 5, 2023	Cooking		^{CREATE}	
Chef John Besh's Family Table	April 6, 2013	April 5, 2016	Cooking			
Cooking with Julie Taboulie	May 4, 2013	May 3, 2016	Cooking			
Sing for Your Supper with Bob Waggoner	September 7, 2013	September 6, 2015	Cooking			
Kevin Dundon's Modern Irish Food	October 23, 2013	October 22, 2017	Cooking			
Neven Maguire: Home Chef	January 7, 2014	January 6, 2017	Cooking			
Martin Yan's Taste of Vietnam	September 6, 2014	September 5, 2016	Cooking			
Joanne Weir Gets Fresh	January 10, 2015	January 1, 2019	Cooking		^{CREATE}	
Kevin Dundon's Back to Basics	April 4, 2015	April 3, 2017	Cooking			
Annabel Langbein: The Free Range Cook	September 5, 2015	September 4, 2017	Cooking			
The Kitchen Wisdom of Cecilia Chiang	July 2, 2016	July 1, 2019	Cooking		^{CREATE}	
Nick Stellino: Storyteller in the Kitchen	February 18, 2017	October 29, 2023	Cooking		^{CREATE}	
On the Road with Vic Rallo: Italy!	September 2, 2017	September 1, 2021	Cooking		^{CREATE}	
Food Over 50	March 26, 2018	September 15, 2022	Cooking		^{CREATE}	
Classic Woodworking	April 1, 2019	March 31, 2025	Home improvement		^{CREATE}	
Leah Chase: The Queen of Creole Cuisine	April 7, 2019	April 6, 2022	Cooking		^{CREATE}	
Field Trip with Curtis Stone	October 5, 2019	October 16, 2023	Cooking		^{CREATE}	

==== 2020s ====
Title	Premiere date	End date	How to	Note(s)	Legend(s)	Source(s)
The Magic of a Dish: New York Top Chef Goes to Japan	June 1, 2020	December 31, 2020	Cooking	(Note: Three-part series.)	^{CREATE}^{NHK}	
Jamie Oliver Together	November 1, 2021	October 31, 2023	Cooking		^{CREATE}	
Help! We Bought a Village	November 1, 2023	August 31, 2026	Home improvement			

=== Travel ===
==== 1970s ====
Title	Premiere date	End date	Note(s)	Legend(s)	Source(s)
The Tourists Are Coming, The Tourists Are Coming	May 3, 1976	September 30, 1976			

==== 1990s ====
Title	Premiere date	End date	Note(s)	Legend(s)	Source(s)
Tracks Ahead	February 25, 1990	March 11, 2000	(Note: Seasons 1-5 only.) (Note: Distributed by NETA (aka National Educational Telecommunications Association) in seasons 6-8.)		
Tracks Ahead	June 2, 2002	November 30, 2008	(Note: Seasons 1-5 only.) (Note: Distributed by NETA (aka National Educational Telecommunications Association) in seasons 6-8.)		
Travels in Europe with Rick Steves	April 1, 1991	December 31, 2004	(Note: This contract was originally scheduled to expire on March 31, 1993 and has been extended.)		
Cabin Country	June 30, 1992	July 1, 1998	(Note: Seasons 1-6 only.) (Note: Distributed by NETA (aka National Educational Telecommunications Association) in seasons 7-13.)		
Swiss Rail Journeys	June 30, 1992	March 31, 2001			
Makin' Tracks	December 1, 1993	September 30, 1998			
Best Travels in Europe With Rick Steves	March 1, 1994	December 30, 2004	(Note: This contract was originally scheduled to expire on March 31, 1996 and has been extended.)		
People Near Here	January 29, 1995	June 3, 2018	(Note: Originally documentary genre.)		
Skeleton Coast Safari	May 1, 1996	May 31, 1999			
Rail Away	December 1, 1996	August 31, 2003			
America's Historic Trails with Tom Bodett	April 1, 1997	March 31, 2012			
America's Scenic Rail Journeys	May 1, 1997	April 30, 1999			
America's Scenic Rail Journeys	November 1, 2001	October 31, 2003			
Origins with Burt Wolf	October 1, 1997	September 30, 2003			
Wine 101	October 1, 1997	September 30, 1999		^{APT WORLDWIDE}	
Traveling Lite	November 9, 1997	January 3, 2002			
European Rail Journeys	November 1, 1998	June 29, 2002			
An Irish Voyage	March 1, 1999	December 31, 2002			
Ray Mears' World of Survival	April 1, 1999	March 31, 2001			
Burt Wolf: Travels & Traditions	April 3, 1999	January 28, 2017		^{CREATE}	
Travels in Mexico and the Caribbean with Shari Belafonte	April 3, 1999	April 2, 2008		^{CREATE}	
World Class Trains	June 30, 1999	August 31, 2007			

==== 2000s ====
Title	Premiere date	End date	Note(s)	Legend(s)	Source(s)
Flyfishing Destinations	February 9, 2000	April 6, 2003			
Cottage Country	May 6, 2000	May 5, 2002			
Avventura: Journeys in Italian Cuisine	May 27, 2000	May 26, 2003			
Burt Wolf: Local Flavors	September 30, 2000	September 29, 2004			
Living Asia	May 6, 2001	May 5, 2004			
Experience America	June 17, 2001	June 16, 2011			
Earth Trek	September 9, 2001	September 8, 2003			
Entrada: Journeys in Latin American Cuisine	January 8, 2002	January 7, 2004			
Train Tracking	February 1, 2002	September 30, 2004			
Train Tracking	April 1, 2005	March 31, 2006			
Discoveries...Ireland	March 1, 2002	February 29, 2004			
Globe Trekker	March 31, 2002	June 29, 2019		^{CREATE}	
Passport to Adventure	June 1, 2002	October 5, 2011		^{CREATE}	
Wings Over Africa	September 1, 2002	August 31, 2004			
Rick Steves' Spain/Iberia	March 4, 2005	December 31, 2005	(Note: Pledge version.)		
Roadtrip Nation: Destination Unknown	August 13, 2005	August 12, 2007			
Rick Steves' Europe Classics	September 5, 2005	September 4, 2016		^{CREATE}	
The Seasoned Traveler	October 1, 2005	April 6, 2013		^{CREATE}	
Great Railway Journeys	March 1, 2006	February 29, 2008	(Note: Series 4 only.) (Note: Distributed by PBS in series 1-3.)		
Grannies on Safari	October 7, 2006	May 13, 2017		^{APT WORLDWIDE}	
Anywhere, Alaska	January 6, 2007	January 5, 2011		^{CREATE}	
Art Wolfe's Travels to the Edge	May 5, 2007	October 3, 2016	(Note: Originally titled Travels to the Edge with Art Wolfe.)	^{APT WORLDWIDE}	
Equitrekking	June 2, 2007	January 1, 2016		^{APT WORLDWIDE}^{CREATE}	
Africa Trek	September 4, 2008	December 31, 2009			
Spain... on the Road Again	September 20, 2008	September 19, 2010			
Passport & Palette	May 2, 2009	May 1, 2011			
OpenRoad	September 5, 2009	September 4, 2015			
Gary Spetz's Watercolor Quest	September 12, 2009	September 11, 2018		^{CREATE}	

==== 2010s ====
Title	Premiere date	End date	Note(s)	Legend(s)	Source(s)
Joanna Lumley's Nile	November 1, 2010	October 31, 2012			
The Secret Caribbean with Trevor McDonald	April 1, 2011	March 31, 2013			
Kimchi Chronicles	July 2, 2011	July 1, 2014			
Caroline Quentin: A Passage Through India	January 1, 2012	December 31, 2013			
Color World with Gary Spetz	January 6, 2012	January 5, 2018		^{CREATE}	
Pedal America	May 5, 2012	May 4, 2016			
The Spice Trail	September 1, 2013	August 31, 2015			
Great Continental Railway Journeys	December 1, 2013	November 30, 2019	(Note: Series 1-5 only.)		
Rhythm Abroad	April 5, 2014	April 4, 2017			
Have Steam Engine Will Travel	May 1, 2014	April 30, 2016			
Chris Tarrant: Extreme Railways	September 1, 2014	March 31, 2023			
Pilgrimage with Simon Reeve	September 1, 2014	August 31, 2016			
Painting the Town with Eric Dowdle	April 4, 2015	April 3, 2019		^{APT WORLDWIDE}^{CREATE}	
Penelope Keith's Hidden Villages	November 1, 2016	October 31, 2020			
Billy Connolly's Tracks Across America	January 1, 2017	December 31, 2018			
Born to Explore with Richard Wiese	January 6, 2017	April 2, 2023	(Note: Originally titled Born to Explore.)	^{CREATE}	
Outside With Greg Aiello	January 31, 2017	July 1, 2021			
Great American Railroad Journeys	June 30, 2017	April 30, 2022			
Destination Craft with Jim West	July 2, 2017	October 7, 2020		^{CREATE}	
Morocco to Timbuktu: An Arabian Adventure	April 1, 2018	March 31, 2020			
Great Scenic Railway Journeys	June 1, 2018	May 31, 2020			
Great Scenic Railway Journeys	January 1, 2021	March 31, 2023			
Dangerous Borders: A Journey Across India & Pakistan	June 30, 2018	June 29, 2020			
Vintage Roads Great & Small	November 1, 2018	January 31, 2022			
Pacific with Sam Neill	March 31, 2019	March 30, 2021			
Escape to the Chateau	April 1, 2019	April 30, 2024			
Off the Beaten Track with Kate Humble	April 1, 2019	March 31, 2021			
Coastal Railways with Julie Walters	June 30, 2019	June 29, 2021			
Hidden Britain by Drone	June 30, 2019	June 29, 2021			
Pilgrimage	September 1, 2019	August 31, 2021			
Find It, Fix It, Drive It	November 1, 2019	October 31, 2021			
Great Indian Railway Journeys	December 1, 2019	November 30, 2021			

==== 2020s ====
Title	Premiere date	End date	Note(s)	Legend(s)	Source(s)
Pilgrimage: The Road to Rome	April 1, 2020	March 31, 2022			
The 1900 Island	July 1, 2020	June 30, 2022			
How the Victorians Built Britain	July 1, 2020	March 31, 2023			
Billy Connolly's Great American Trail	August 1, 2020	July 31, 2022			
Arabia with Levison Wood	November 1, 2020	October 31, 2022			
Scotland's Scenic Railways	December 1, 2020	February 29, 2024			
Connected: A Search for Unity	February 1, 2021	March 31, 2024			
Roadfood	December 3, 2021	December 2, 2024		^{CREATE}	
In the Footsteps of...	April 1, 2022	March 31, 2024			
Miriam and Alan: Lost in Scotland	June 1, 2022	May 31, 2025			
Britain by Beach	August 1, 2022	August 31, 2025			
Britain's Scenic Railways	November 1, 2022	October 31, 2024			
Kate Humble's Coastal Britain	April 1, 2023	March 31, 2025			
Adrian Dunbar: My Ireland	November 1, 2023	October 31, 2025			
Paul Hollywood Goes to Hollywood	January 1, 2024	December 31, 2025			
Britain's Secret Islands	January 1, 2024	December 31, 2025			

=== Health ===
==== 1980s ====
Title	Premiere date	End date	Note(s)	Legend(s)	Source(s)
The Doctor Is In	June 4, 1989	January 3, 2010			

==== 1990s ====
Title	Premiere date	End date	Note(s)	Legend(s)	Source(s)
Christiane Northrup, M.D. Package	March 1, 1998	July 31, 2003	(Note: This package includes Women's Bodies Women's Choices and Women's Bodies Women's Minds: The Mind Body Connection in season 1 and Your Diet, Your Health and The Wisdom of Menopause in season 2.)		
Health Diary	September 6, 1998	September 29, 2004	(Note: Originally science & health genre in season 3.)		
Dr. Wayne Dyer Package	November 23, 1998	October 31, 2007	(Note: This package includes How To Get What You Really, Really, Really, Really Want and Improve Your Life Using the Wisdom of the Ages.)		

==== 2000s ====
Title	Premiere date	End date	Note(s)	Legend(s)	Source(s)
TVMD	July 1, 2001	May 3, 2012			
Simple Wisdom with Irwin Kula	April 6, 2003	April 5, 2015			
It's an Age Thing	June 1, 2003	May 31, 2019			
Lilias!	January 4, 2004	January 3, 2013	(Note: Formerly known as Lilias, Yoga and You.) (Note: Distributed by PBS from 1972 to 2003.) (Note: Seasons 3 and 4 only.)		
Keeping Kids Healthy	April 4, 2004	September 29, 2010			
Health Sense	April 4, 2004	January 4, 2010			
Cancer Story	April 1, 2005	March 31, 2011			
Power Yoga: Mind and Body	April 3, 2006	April 2, 2018			

==== 2010s ====
Title	Premiere date	End date	Note(s)	Legend(s)	Source(s)
Health Secrets: What Every Woman Should Know	October 1, 2010	September 30, 2013			
Your Turn to Care	July 1, 2012	June 30, 2015			
Age Wise	January 1, 2016	January 31, 2019			
Overcoming Depression: Mind Over Marathon	June 1, 2018	May 31, 2020			

==== 2020s ====
Title	Premiere date	End date	Note(s)	Legend(s)	Source(s)
Step It Up with Steph	January 6, 2020	July 21, 2023			
YNDI Yoga	February 14, 2022	February 13, 2026		^{CREATE}	

=== Lifestyle ===
==== 2000s ====
Title	Premiere date	End date	Note(s)	Legend(s)	Source(s)
Katie Brown Workshop	April 1, 2006	September 30, 2017	(Note: How to/home improvement genre in season 1.) (Note: Originally how to/home improvement genre in season 2.) (Note: Originally how to/cooking genre in season 4.)	^{APT WORLDWIDE}^{CREATE}	
Gourmet's Diary of a Foodie	October 7, 2006	January 23, 2012		^{CREATE}	
The Donna Dewberry Show	January 6, 2007	April 3, 2016	(Note: How to/painting genre in season 1.)	^{CREATE}	
Simple Living with Wanda Urbanska	January 6, 2007	January 5, 2015			
Donna's Day Starring Donna Erickson	April 1, 2007	September 4, 2010		^{APT WORLDWIDE}^{CREATE}	
The Endless Feast	April 7, 2007	April 6, 2009	(Note: How to/cooking genre in seasons 1 and 2.)	^{CREATE}	
The Endless Feast	April 3, 2010	April 2, 2012	(Note: How to/cooking genre in seasons 1 and 2.)	^{CREATE}	
Uncorked: Wine Made Simple	April 21, 2007	April 20, 2013			
Lassie's Pet Vet	July 14, 2007	July 13, 2013			
Knit & Crochet Today	September 1, 2007	August 31, 2015			
Gardenstory: Inspiring Spaces, Healing Places	April 5, 2008	April 4, 2011			
Make:	January 3, 2009	January 2, 2019	(Note: Originally titled Make:TV.)	^{APT WORLDWIDE}	
Hannah Help Me!	June 28, 2009	June 27, 2011			
The Winemakers	September 26, 2009	September 25, 2018			

==== 2010s ====
Title	Premiere date	End date	Note(s)	Legend(s)	Source(s)
Everyday Edisons	May 1, 2010	April 30, 2015			
Growing Bolder	September 3, 2010	January 4, 2015			
Growing Bolder	January 6, 2018	May 5, 2023			
Vine Talk	April 2, 2011	April 1, 2012			
Make Your Mark	September 4, 2014	September 3, 2026		^{CREATE}	
iQ: Smartparent	October 5, 2014	February 4, 2026			
VisionKeepers	April 7, 2018	April 6, 2021			

==== 2020s ====
Title	Premiere date	End date	Note(s)	Legend(s)	Source(s)
Getting Dot Older	January 1, 2022	April 30, 2026			
The Travelling Auctioneers	April 1, 2023	April 30, 2026			

== Reality specials ==
=== How-to ===
==== 1990s ====
Title	Premiere date	End date	How to	Note(s)	Legend(s)	Source(s)
Burt Wolf Eating Well Live Marathon	November 27, 1993	December 31, 1994	N/A			
Mexican Madness: A Great Chefs Special	February 23, 1994	March 31, 1997	N/A			
Great Outdoors Cooking: A Great Chefs Special	May 12, 1994	May 11, 1997	N/A			
Computer Chronicles: Consumer Buying Guide Special	November 26, 1994	December 31, 1996	N/A			
Fireborn: 9 Skills for the 90's	November 27, 1994	December 31, 1995	N/A			
Fireborn: 9 Skills for the 90's	March 29, 1998	December 31, 1999	N/A			
Parenting for Today: Who's in Charge?	February 24, 1995	March 31, 1998	N/A			
Great American Inns: A Great Chefs Special	June 3, 1995	December 31, 1997	N/A			
Great French Fest: A Great Chefs Special	June 3, 1995	December 31, 1997	N/A			
Chocolate Dreams: A Great Chefs Special	July 29, 1997	July 28, 1999	N/A			
Getting the Love You Want: Safety & Passion	August 10, 1997	December 31, 1999	N/A			
Quest: Love, Passion & Soul	February 1, 1998	January 31, 2001	N/A			
Email for Everyone	March 15, 1998	March 14, 2000	N/A			
Caring for Antiques: A Sotheby's Guide	April 23, 1998	April 30, 2001	N/A			
Staying Alive: A Consumer Reports Car Show Safety	April 30, 1998	April 29, 1999	N/A			
Morning Glories: A Country Inn Cooking Special	August 15, 1998	April 30, 2000	N/A			
Quest: Soulmates	November 1, 1998	October 31, 2001	N/A			
Quest: Ecstasy*	November 1, 1998	October 31, 2001	N/A			
George Hirsch for Better Living and Lifestyles*	November 14, 1998	January 1, 2001	N/A			
Get Healthy Now! with Gary Null	March 3, 1999	March 31, 2001	N/A			
Health Diary: Women's Health Special	May 2, 1999	May 1, 2002	N/A			
Savor the Southwest: Tips & Techniques	August 7, 1999	March 31, 2001	N/A			

==== 2000s ====
Title	Premiere date	End date	How to	Note(s)	Legend(s)	Source(s)
Assuming the Power of Parenthood With John Rosemond	March 1, 2000	June 30, 2002	N/A			
The Savage Truth on Money	March 2, 2000	March 1, 2002	N/A			
Age-Proof Your Body with Elizabeth Somer	August 4, 2000	August 31, 2003	Self help			
8 Keys to a Better Work Life with Dr. Marty Nemko	March 1, 2001	February 28, 2003	Self help			
Inner Peace for Busy People with Dr. Joan Borysenko	August 1, 2001	August 31, 2004	Self help			
Women Going Global: Strategies for Success	October 1, 2001	March 5, 2007	Self help	(Note: Planned to end on September 30, 2008.)		
America's Test Kitchen: Mastering Shrimp	November 19, 2001	January 4, 2006	Cooking			
Natural Beauty: Salon Secrets at Home	March 1, 2002	March 31, 2004	Self help			
Julia Child's Kitchen Wisdom	August 1, 2002	September 30, 2002	Cooking			
Julia Child's Kitchen Wisdom	February 23, 2003	February 22, 2005	Cooking			
Donna Dewberry's Painting Extravaganza	February 23, 2003	February 22, 2005	Painting			
Donna Dewberry's Painting Extravaganza	July 24, 2005	July 23, 2006	Painting			
Chronic Pain Relief with Dr. James Dillard	March 1, 2003	March 31, 2006	Self help			
Women of Wisdom and Power III: The Power Within	March 1, 2003	March 31, 2006	Self help			
Great Parents, Great Kids with Dr. Dana Chidekel	May 30, 2003	November 29, 2004	Self help			
Memories and Scrapbooking for Your Home	June 1, 2003	May 31, 2005	N/A			
The Power of Losing Control with Joe Caruso	August 1, 2003	July 31, 2006	Self help			
Everyday Grace with Marianne Williamson	August 1, 2003	July 31, 2006	Self help			
The Power of Prevention: Making Your Family Safer	November 23, 2003	November 22, 2007	Self help			
Lessons form the Monk Who Sold His Ferrari	November 24, 2003	November 23, 2007	Self help			
Terry Madden's 7 Secrets to Great Watercolor	November 27, 2003	December 31, 2007	Painting	(Note: Virtual Pledge Event.)		
Picture This: Weight Loss with Dr. Howard Shapiro	November 28, 2003	December 31, 2006	Self help			
Inside America's Test Kitchen	February 26, 2004	March 25, 2005	Cooking			
Starter Strokes with Donna Dewberry	March 1, 2004	February 28, 2007	Painting			
Donna Dewberry's Spectacular One Stroke Painting	March 1, 2004	February 28, 2006	Painting			
Improving Your Memory with Dr. Barry Gordon	June 1, 2004	August 31, 2006	Self help			
Parenting the Strong-Willed Child	July 31, 2004	July 30, 2008	Self help			
Household Concoctions	November 21, 2004	November 20, 2006	Home improvement			
Keith Harrell: Attitude Is Everything for Success	November 22, 2004	November 21, 2007	Self help			
Ballroom Dancing Basics	November 26, 2004	December 31, 2007	Self help	(Note: Planned to be How-to/dancing genre.)		
At Home with Donna Dewberry	March 1, 2005	February 28, 2011	Painting			
Ageless Skin: Secrets from Dr. Denese	March 1, 2005	February 28, 2011	Self help			
Terry Madden's 5 Tips to Making Memories	May 27, 2005	May 26, 2009	Painting			
Qi Gong for Beginners	August 1, 2005	August 31, 2007	Self help			
Qi Gong for Beginners	September 1, 2007	August 31, 2009	Self help			
Lidia's Family Table Favorites	November 19, 2005	December 31, 2008	Cooking		^{CREATE}	
Smart Gardening	February 25, 2006	June 22, 2007	Gardening	(Note: Planned to end on March 31, 2008.)	^{CREATE}	
The Five Keys to Mastery	February 26, 2006	February 25, 2008	Self help	(Note: Originally titled The 5 Keys to Mastery: Opening Doors to Lifelong Success with George Leonard.)		
Barbecue University with Steven Raichlen	May 19, 2006	May 18, 2008	Cooking		^{CREATE}	
Cooking Thin and Loving Food with Chef Kathleen	June 1, 2006	June 30, 2009	Cooking			
Food Trip with Todd English: Japan	October 15, 2006	October 14, 2008	Cooking		^{CREATE}	
The Hidden Wisdom of Our Yearnings with Irwin Kula	November 19, 2006	December 31, 2012	Self help			
Lidia's Family Table Favorites: Encore!	February 24, 2007	March 31, 2009	Cooking		^{CREATE}	
America's Test Kitchen Live!	July 22, 2007	July 21, 2011	Cooking			
Go Put Your Strengths to Work	July 22, 2007	August 21, 2010	Self help			
La Respuesta Está En Ti	September 1, 2008	August 31, 2010	Self help			
The Artist's Way at Work with Mark Bryan	September 1, 2008	August 31, 2010	Self help			
The Answers Within with Dr. Isabel	September 1, 2008	August 31, 2010	Self help			
Food Trip with Todd English: Peru	April 18, 2009	April 17, 2010	N/A		^{CREATE}	

==== 2010s ====
Title	Premiere date	End date	How to	Note(s)	Legend(s)	Source(s)
Diet Free with Zonya Foco, RD	March 1, 2010	February 28, 2016	Self help			
Fannie's Last Supper	November 6, 2010	November 5, 2012	Cooking		^{APT WORLDWIDE}^{CREATE}	
Painting the Wyland Way: Live in Studio	February 24, 2011	February 23, 2014	Painting		^{CREATE}	
Pizza Night with Father Dom	February 8, 2012	February 7, 2014	Cooking			
Haley's Hints: Household Heroes	November 29, 2013	December 31, 2015	Home improvement			
Haley's Hints: Fighting Filth	November 29, 2013	December 31, 2015	Home improvement			
Haley's Hints: To the Rescue	November 29, 2013	December 31, 2015	Home improvement			
Haley's Hints: Potent Potions	November 29, 2013	December 31, 2015	Home improvement			
Painting the Wyland Way 2: Sea Turtle Rising	March 1, 2014	February 28, 2016	Painting		^{CREATE}	
On Meditation	November 28, 2014	December 31, 2016	Self help		^{APT WORLDWIDE}	
Feel Better with Pressure Point Therapy	June 30, 2016	June 30, 2018	Self help			
Feel Better with Pressure Point Therapy	August 9, 2019	August 8, 2023	Self help			
Surviving Thanksgiving with Sara Moulton	November 10, 2016	November 9, 2019	Cooking			
America's Home Cooking: Holiday Side Dishes	November 19, 2016	December 18, 2018	Cooking			
A World Without Cancer: The Real Promise of Prevention with Margaret I. Cuomo MD	November 25, 2016	December 31, 2019	Self help			
Qi Gong for Anxiety	November 26, 2016	December 31, 2017	Self help	(Note: Part of Qi Gong Package with Lee Holden.)		
Qi Gong for Energy & Vitality	November 26, 2016	December 31, 2017	Self help			
Less Stress & More Energy With Qi Gong	November 26, 2016	December 31, 2017	Self help			
America's Home Cooking: B Is for Bacon	March 1, 2017	March 31, 2019	Cooking			
America's Home Cooking: Eat Your Veggies!	June 1, 2017	June 30, 2019	Cooking			
The Houston Cookbook	November 17, 2018	November 16, 2024	Cooking		^{CREATE}	
Taste the Florida Keys with Chef Michelle Bernstein	February 15, 2019	February 14, 2025	Cooking		^{CREATE}	
The Best of The Joy of Painting: Special Edition	March 1, 2019	August 31, 2025	Painting			
Chef Darren: The Challenge of Profound Deafness	October 1, 2019	September 30, 2021	Cooking			
Growing Bolder's Launchpad to What's Next	November 10, 2019	November 9, 2025	Self help			

==== 2020s ====
Title	Premiere date	End date	How to	Note(s)	Legend(s)	Source(s)
What to Eat When with Dr. Michael Roizen and Michael Crupain	November 27, 2020	December 26, 2023	Self help			
Bloodline	February 12, 2021	February 11, 2024	Cooking			
America's Test Kitchen Special: Home for the Holidays	November 16, 2021	November 15, 2023	Cooking		^{CREATE}	
Secrets to Pain-Free Sitting with Esther Gokhale	June 1, 2022	May 31, 2025	Self help			
The Great Age Reboot	November 15, 2022	November 14, 2025	Self help			
America's Home Cooking: When in Rome	February 23, 2023	March 31, 2025	Cooking			
America's Home Cooking: Gadgets & Gizmos	February 22, 2024	March 31, 2025	Cooking			
America's Home Cooking: Sweets	August 10, 2024	September 9, 2026	Cooking			

=== Travel ===
==== 1990s ====
Title	Premiere date	End date	Note(s)	Legend(s)	Source(s)
The Pennsylvania Road Show	March 1, 1993	February 28, 1999			
Pike's Peak by Rail	June 1, 1994	May 31, 2000			
Great Smokey Mountain Railways	September 1, 1994	August 31, 1996			
Girl Friday	April 1, 1996	March 31, 1998			
The Best of the Mediterranean with Rick Steves	December 1, 1998	December 31, 2004			

==== 2000s ====
Title	Premiere date	End date	Note(s)	Legend(s)	Source(s)
Empires of Steam	June 30, 2000	June 29, 2002			
Rick Steves' Europe "Exotic Europe"	November 24, 2001	December 31, 2002			
Rick Steves' England Pledge Special 2002	February 23, 2002	December 31, 2002			
Rick Steves' Affordable Europe Travel Skills Pledge Special 2002	February 23, 2002	December 31, 2002			
Smart Travels: Europe's Best	February 25, 2002	March 31, 2007		^{CREATE}	
The Travel Detective	June 1, 2002	June 30, 2004			
Globe Shopper	August 1, 2002	August 31, 2002			
Rick Steves' Italy	November 23, 2002	December 31, 2003			
Rick Steves' Ireland	February 15, 2003	December 31, 2003			
Great Steam Train Tours	February 16, 2003	February 15, 2005			
Super Chief: Speed, Style, Service	June 1, 2003	May 31, 2007			
Rick Steves' Castles & Mountains	November 27, 2003	December 31, 2004			
Rick Steves' Classic Europe	November 25, 2004	December 31, 2005			
Rick Steves' Vive La France	March 1, 2006	March 31, 2007			
Visions of France: Provence	July 23, 2006	July 22, 2008			
Visions of France: The Riviera	July 23, 2006	July 22, 2008			
Rick Steves: Italy's Dolce Vita	March 3, 2007	March 31, 2009			
Rick Steves' Insider's Europe	February 23, 2008	March 31, 2009			

==== 2010s ====
Title	Premiere date	End date	Note(s)	Legend(s)	Source(s)
Rick Steves' Europe with Abandon!	February 20, 2011	February 19, 2014			
Rick Steves' Viva Espana!	February 20, 2011	February 19, 2017			
Travelscope: Christmas in Switzerland	November 15, 2011	November 14, 2017			
Rudy Maxa's World: Escape to French Polynesia	February 7, 2012	February 6, 2017			
Over Hawai'i	March 1, 2012	February 29, 2016			
Trains Around North America	June 1, 2012	June 30, 2014			
Trains Around North America	July 1, 2014	June 30, 2016			
Rick Steves Rome	September 1, 2012	July 17, 2026	(Note: Originally titled Rick Steves Special: Rome, Eternally Engaging.) (Note: Planned to end on July 17, 2027.)	^{CREATE}	
Richard Bangs' South America: Quest for Wonder	October 7, 2012	October 6, 2018			
Rick Steves' Europe Travel Skills	March 1, 2013	February 29, 2016			
Rick Steves' Dynamic Europe: Amsterdam, Prague, Berlin	February 24, 2015	February 23, 2020			
Slovakia: Treasures in the Heart of Europe	March 2, 2016	March 1, 2025		^{CREATE}	
Rudy Maxa's World: The Taste of Japan	November 3, 2016	November 2, 2021			
The World's Most Famous Train	December 1, 2016	November 30, 2018			
Born to Explore with Richard Wiese: Namibia: Land of Cheetahs	October 12, 2018	October 11, 2021		^{CREATE}	
Rick Steves' European Travel Tips and Tricks	March 1, 2019	March 31, 2023		^{CREATE}	
Hitler's Holocaust Railways	May 1, 2019	April 30, 2021			
Great Scenic Railway Journeys: 150 Years on the Right Track	June 1, 2019	June 30, 2021			
Great Scenic Railway Journeys: 150 Years on the Right Track	July 1, 2021	December 31, 2022			

==== 2020s ====
Title	Premiere date	End date	Note(s)	Legend(s)	Source(s)
Wild Travels: America's Most Unusual Festivals	December 1, 2020	November 30, 2022		^{CREATE}	
Dream of Italy: Travel, Transform and Thrive	May 30, 2021	May 29, 2025		^{APT WORLDWIDE}^{CREATE}	
Building the Channel Tunnel	December 1, 2021	November 30, 2023			
The Herriot Way	November 1, 2022	March 31, 2025			
Great Scenic Railway Journeys 30th Anniversary Special	June 1, 2023	June 30, 2025			
Great Scenic Railway Journeys 30th Anniversary Special	July 1, 2025	September 15, 2026			

=== Health ===
==== 1990s ====
Title	Premiere date	End date	Note(s)	Legend(s)	Source(s)
Alzheimer's Disease: Descent into Silence	September 1, 1997	August 31, 2003	(Note: Originally nature & science genre.)		
Living Well in the Unwell Times	August 2, 1998	August 1, 2000			
America Exhausted	November 28, 1998	November 27, 2001			

==== 2000s ====
Title	Premiere date	End date	Note(s)	Legend(s)	Source(s)
A Spoonful of Ginger: Food as Medicine	November 26, 2000	December 31, 2002			
RX for Stroke Prevention	March 8, 2001	March 7, 2007			
Finding the Strength Within: Living with Cancer	June 1, 2001	May 31, 2003			
Health Diary Special: Coping in Uncertain Times	December 30, 2001	December 29, 2004			
Facing Alzheimer's: An African-American Perspective	October 4, 2002	October 3, 2017			
Well into Your Future: Mental Health and Aging	May 4, 2003	May 3, 2004			
Yoga for the Rest of Us	August 1, 2003	July 31, 2007			
The Brain-Beauty Connection	November 28, 2003	December 31, 2006			
The Barnard Summit: Women and Health	February 29, 2004	February 28, 2005			
Take a Load Off Your Heart	March 1, 2004	February 28, 2007			
A Fight to the Finish: Stories of Polio	April 1, 2004	March 31, 2008			
More Yoga for the Rest of Us with Peggy Cappy	July 30, 2004	July 29, 2007			
Heartbeat to Heartbeat: Women and Heart Disease	February 1, 2005	January 31, 2015			
The Heart of Pilates	February 25, 2005	March 31, 2007			
Superfoods: Prescription for a Healthy Life	November 25, 2005	November 24, 2007			
Bellydance Fitness Fusion Yoga	July 23, 2006	July 22, 2012			
Bellydance Fitness Fusion Jazz	July 23, 2006	July 22, 2012			
Men Get Depression	May 1, 2008	April 30, 2010			
Su Salud Primero/Your Health First	November 1, 2009	October 31, 2012			

==== 2010s ====
Title	Premiere date	End date	Note(s)	Legend(s)	Source(s)
Longevity Tai Chi with Arthur Rosenfeld	November 17, 2010	November 16, 2013			
The Parents' Survival Guide: Childhood Obesity	May 6, 2012	May 5, 2016			
Heart 411	March 1, 2014	March 31, 2017			
Aging Backwards with Miranda Esmonde-White	November 23, 2014	November 22, 2017			
Wai Lana Yoga for a Better Life & a Better World	May 30, 2015	May 29, 2025			
OCD and Me	October 1, 2016	September 30, 2018			
Forever Painless with Miranda Esmonde-White	November 22, 2016	November 21, 2023			
Advertising in the Digital Age: You're Soaking in It	June 1, 2018	May 31, 2020			
Aging Backwards 2 with Miranda Esmonde-White	November 24, 2018	November 23, 2024			
NHK Special: Medical Frontiers Special - Search for Superfoods in Okinawa	May 1, 2019	August 31, 2019		^{NHK}	

==== 2020s ====
Title	Premiere date	End date	Note(s)	Legend(s)	Source(s)
Medical Frontiers Special - Search for Superfoods in Niigata	September 1, 2020	December 31, 2020		^{NHK}	

=== Lifestyle ===
==== 2000s ====
Title	Premiere date	End date	Note(s)	Legend(s)	Source(s)
Enjoying Wine with Mark Phillips	February 23, 2006	February 22, 2010			
Learn to Knit	February 25, 2006	February 24, 2010			
Healthy Style	May 6, 2007	May 5, 2010			
The Not So Big House: Home by Design	June 30, 2007	March 31, 2009			
The Journey to Greatness with Noah benShea	March 1, 2009	April 1, 2012			
Pilates for Healthy Bodies with Karena Thek Lineback	May 29, 2009	June 30, 2011			

==== 2010s ====
Title	Premiere date	End date	Note(s)	Legend(s)	Source(s)
Nonna Tell Me a Story: Lidia's Christmas Kitchen	November 22, 2010	December 31, 2011		^{CREATE}	
Treasure Trackers	June 1, 2011	June 30, 2013			
Heirloom Meals' Thanksgiving	November 6, 2011	November 5, 2016			
Heirloom Meals Christmas	November 18, 2012	November 17, 2016			

==== 2020s ====
Title	Premiere date	End date	Note(s)	Legend(s)	Source(s)
Living Longer, Living Well: Secrets of the Mediterranean	September 1, 2024	August 31, 2026			

== See also ==
- List of programs formerly distributed by American Public Television
- List of PBS member stations
- List of programs broadcast by PBS
- List of programs broadcast by PBS Kids
- List of programs broadcast by Create
- List of worldwide programs distributed by American Public Television
