= Roast chicken =

Dish of whole chicken broiled or fried on all sides to cook it through

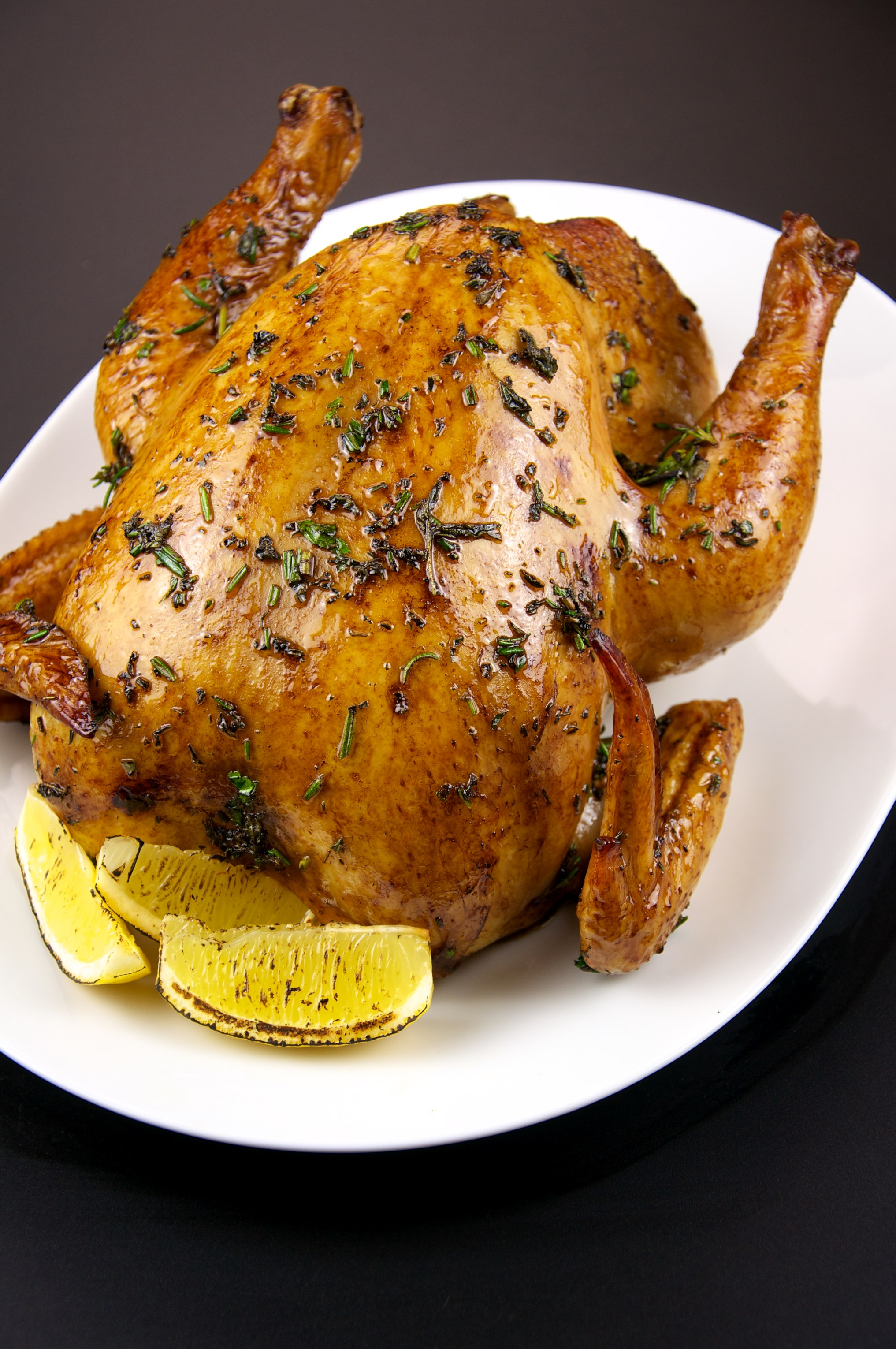
Oven roasted chicken

Roast chicken is chicken prepared as food by roasting whether in a home kitchen, over a fire, or with a rotisserie (rotary spit). Generally, the chicken is roasted with its own fat and juices by circulating the meat during roasting, and therefore, is usually cooked exposed to fire or heat with some type of rotary grill so that the circulation of these fats and juices is as efficient as possible. Roast chicken is a dish that appears in a wide variety of cuisines worldwide.

== Varieties ==
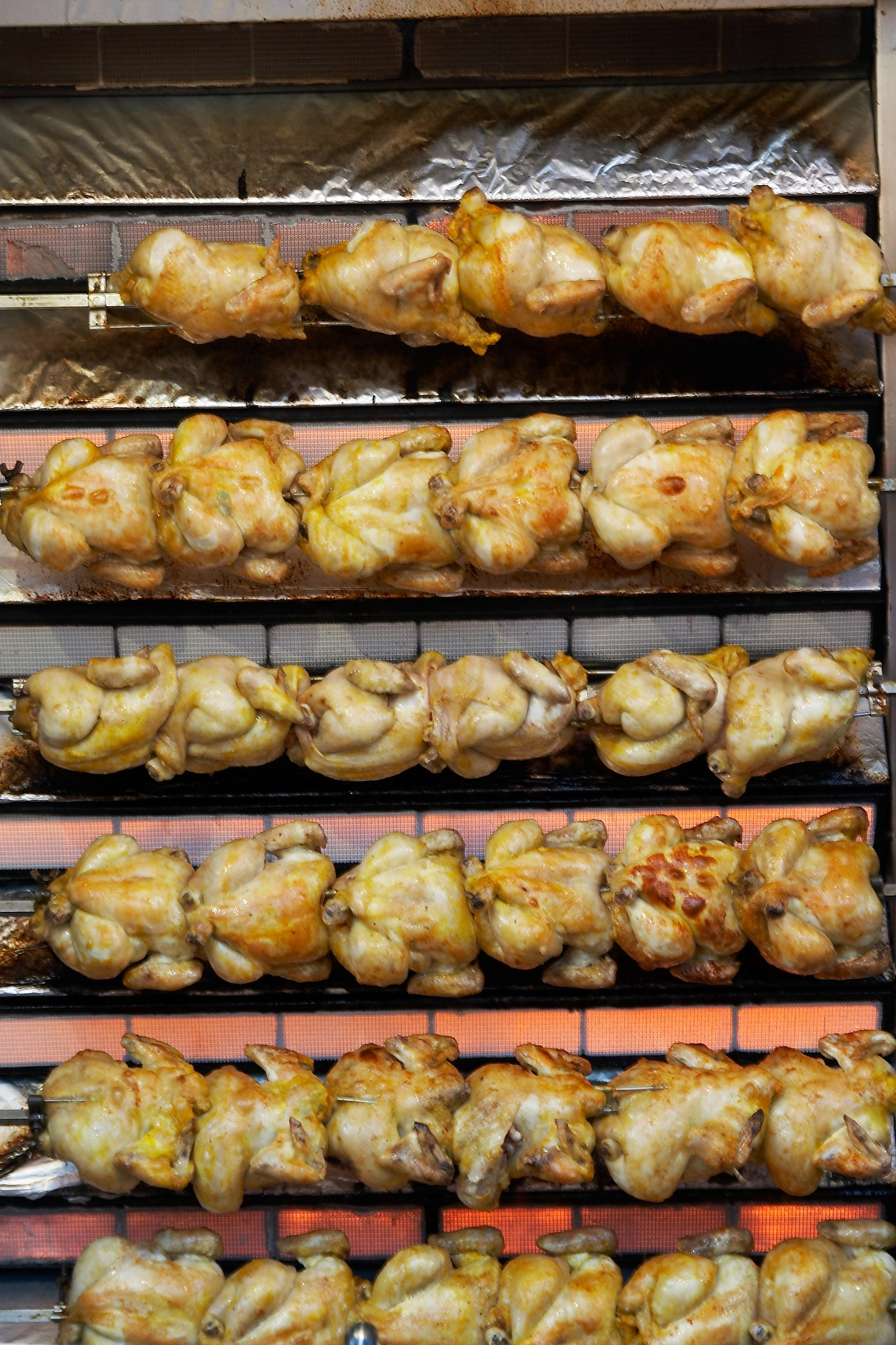
Rotisserie chicken at the Fiestas de San Isidro in Madrid in 2007

=== Hendl ===
Hendl is the Austro-Bavarian word for chicken, most commonly in its roasted form (Brathendl). Another popular form is the fried Backhendl (French: poulet frit à la viennoise) version, a specialty of the Viennese cuisine. The Standard German term is Hähnchen ("cockerel"). In the new states of Germany it is often called Broiler.

Hendls are traditionally served in Bavarian beer gardens or at festivals such as Oktoberfest, and are generally eaten with potato salad or a Breze, possibly accompanied by a Maß of beer. They are also widely available from mobile rotisserie trucks that park near well-frequented locations such as supermarkets or large parking lots.

Paprika Hendl (paprika chicken) is mentioned in Bram Stoker's Dracula, as a dish enjoyed by J. Harker who wishes to get the recipe for his wife-to-be, Mina.

=== Pollo asado or a la Brasa ===
Pollo a la brasa, also known as pollo asado, Peruvian chicken or Blackened chicken in the United States and charcoal chicken in Australia. The original version consisted of a chicken cooked in charcoal but the preparation has evolved and marinated meat is now roasted in the heat of the coals of a special oven called a rotombo which rotates the bird on its own axis, consistently receiving heat from the coals. The oven can be operated using coal, gas, or wood, with the more traditional wood being from the Prosopis pallida tree.

=== Other varieties ===
Rotisserie chicken has become a growing trend in the United States since the mid 1990s. American supermarkets commonly roast rotisserie chickens using either horizontal or vertical rotisseries. These chickens are a means of using unsold fresh chickens and are often sold at lower prices than fresh chickens. Wholesale club Costco does not recycle fresh chickens but is noted for selling 60 million of its US$4.99 whole roasted chickens each year. The Boston Market fast casual restaurant chain originally specialized in roast chicken.

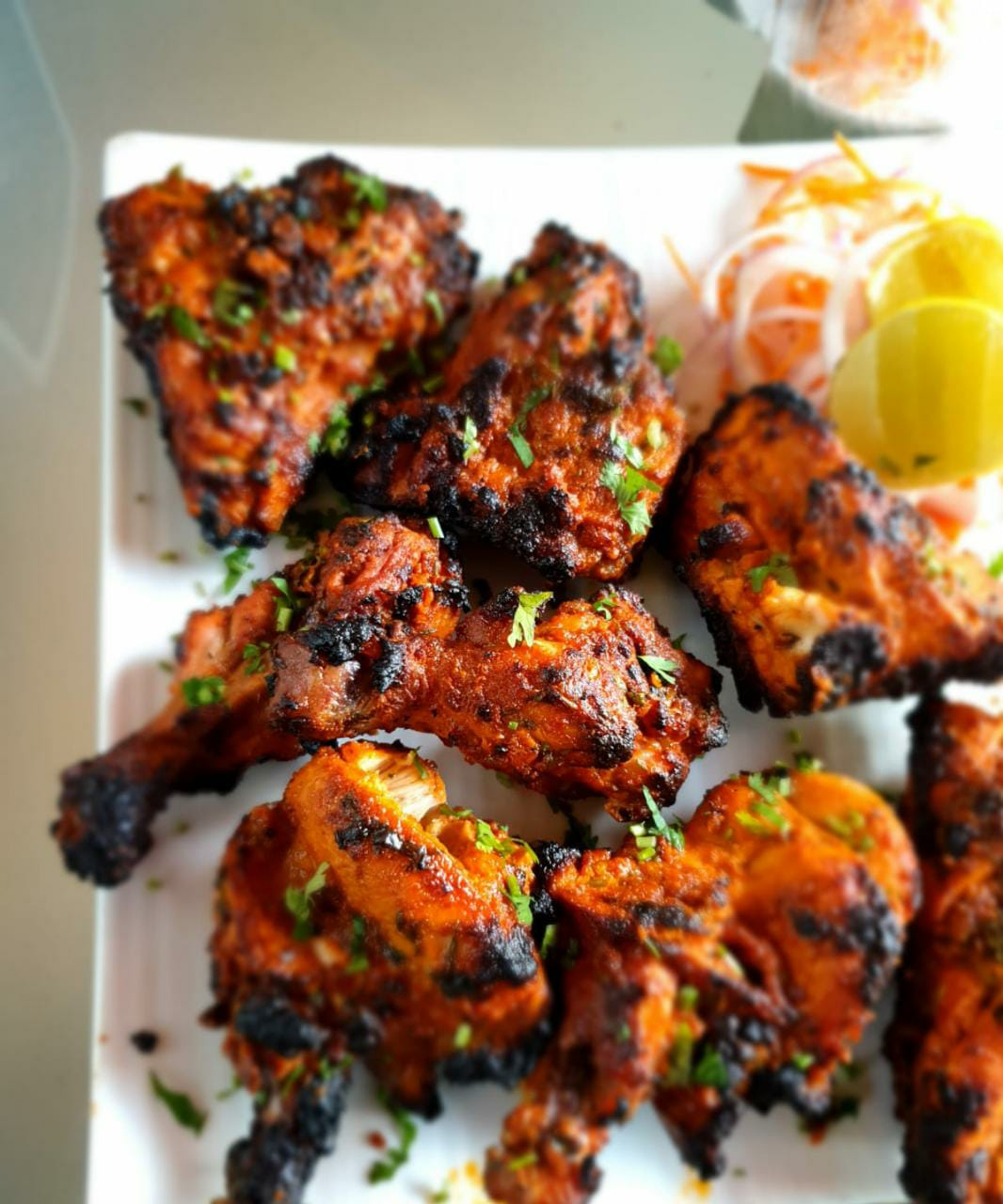
Tandoori chicken

Tandoori chicken is a dish popular on the Indian subcontinent consisting of chicken roasted in a cylindrical clay oven, a tandoor, and prepared with yogurt and spices.

The Levantine Arab shawarma, Turkish döner kebab and Greek gyros can be made from a variety of meats, one of which is chicken. The Taiwanese version of shawarma, shāwēimǎ (Chinese: 沙威瑪), is nearly always chicken.

Oven roasted chicken is often served in the United States for special family meals including holidays such as Rosh Hashanah, Christmas and sometimes Easter or Thanksgiving. Considered a "comfort food" by many, oven roasted chicken had a resurgence of popularity in the mid to late 1990s as more restaurants and recipe publishers started to refocus on classic American fare. The basic roasting process involves removing the neck and giblets from the cavity, trussing the bird and folding the wings underneath, seasoning the skin and/or cavity, and then placing the bird in a pre-heated oven. The bird should be basted regularly, and is considered done when a meat thermometer registers 170 °F (77 °C) for white meat or 185 °F (85 °C) for dark meat. It is commonly stuffed with oyster stuffing, chestnut stuffing or potato stuffing, or other varieties of stuffings.

Chicken under a brick is a manner of preparation in which the chicken is weighed down by a brick or other heavy object.

== See also ==
- Rotisserie chicken
- Murgh musallam
- List of chicken dishes
- List of fast-food chicken restaurants
- List of spit-roasted foods
- Roast turkey
