= Rallo =

Rallo may refer to:

- Rallo Tubbs, fictional character in The Cleveland Show
- Greg Rallo, American professional ice hockey player
- Joseph Rallo, American academic administrator
- Maria das Graças Rallo, birth name of Brazilian singer Cláudya
- Victor Rallo, American restaurateur and wine critic
- Vito Rallo, Italian prelate of the Catholic Church
