= Chefs A' Field =

American documentary TV series

- Genre: Cooking
- Country of origin: United States
- Original language: English
- No. of seasons: 4

Production
- Production companies: Warner Hanson Television & KCTS

Original release
- Network: Syndication, Create
- Release: 2004 – present

Chefs A’ Field is an American documentary cooking series broadcast on public television that focuses on the personal stories of farmers, fishermen, foragers and chefs, offering viewers a new way of looking at their food, environment, and community (strong focus on sustainability).

Each episode of Chefs A’ Field starts with a well-known restaurant, travels to the field and returns to the kitchen, where the ingredients are transformed into dishes on the menus of America's finest restaurants. The audience views the chefs' interactions with farmers and fishermen.

Now in its third season on television, Chefs A’ Field offers a new batch of culinary adventures for all ages as America's best chefs—and their kids—venture out to farms, fishing boats and ranches for a look at where great food comes from. Together, the chefs and their children go in search of fresh ingredients for unique local specialties, interacting with farmers, fishermen, foragers and ranchers, in Chefs A’ Field: Kids on the Farm.

Top chefs featured in the Chefs A’ Field season one, two, and three include Cathal Armstrong, Greg Atkinson, Dan Barber, John Besh, David Bull, Karen DeMasco, Traci Des Jardins, Tom Douglas, Suzanne Goin, Debbie Gold, Todd Gray, Stan Frankenthaler, Sam Hayward, Peter Hoffman, Matt Littledog, Michael Mina, Rick Moonen, Michel Nischan, Patrick O’Connell, Jacques Pepin, Odessa Piper, Nora Pouillon, Anne Quatrano, Mitch & Steve Rosenthal, Richard Sandoval, George Schenk, Cory Schreiber, Bruce Sherman, Holly Smith, Michael Smith, Frank Stitt, Johnathan Sundstrom, Bill Telepan, Jeff Tunks, Robert Wiedmaier, Jason Wilson, Joseph Wrede, and others.

Chefs A’ Field was the first cooking-related program ever to be produced in High Definition for American viewing and has received wide critical acclaim as well as an Emmy Award nomination and awarded two prestigious James Beard Awards, including Best National Television Cooking Program. The series has also received two CINE Golden Eagle Awards, two White House Photographers Awards, The Chicago Film Festival's Gold Hugo Award, and has been recognized by Food & Wine Magazine with their annual Tastemaker Award.

The anticipated fourth season of the critically acclaimed series will offer a new batch of culinary adventures from around the world.

== Additional Award Information ==
In its first two seasons, Chefs A’ Field received 2 James Beard Awards, including “Best National Television Cooking Program” & “Best Television Cooking Special.”

Chefs A’ Field: Kids on the Farm (third season) was nominated for a 2008 Daytime Emmy Award for “Outstanding Achievement in Photography.” The Emmy is considered one of television's most prestigious awards.

The series was also awarded 2 CINE Golden Eagle Awards for “excellence in film making.” Chefs A’ Field is the first cooking series to win this prestigious award.

Chefs A’ Field has been awarded the prestigious Gold Plaque for “Excellence in Television” from the 43rd Chicago International Film Festival and Hugo Television Awards.

Chefs A’ Field: Kids on the Farm was awarded the 2008 Parents Choice Award for television programming. The national award is “given to producers that exceed standards set by educators, scientists, artists, librarians, parents, and yes, kids themselves.”

Chefs A’ Field was chosen as a featured festival highlight with exclusive screenings at the seven-week-long Walt Disney World 2006 & 2007 Epcot Food & Wine Festival. The producers of the series were recognized by FOOD & WINE MAGAZINE with the prestigious Tastemaker Awards—presented annually to honor the “top innovators and trendsetters in the world of food.”

Chefs A’ Field: Kids on the Farm was awarded the Gold World Medal for Family Programs at the 2008 New York Festivals. NYF recognizes the “world’s best work” in television and radio. Also in 2008, the series was honored with The Film Advisory Board’s “Award of Excellence” for family programming.
