= Joanne Weir's Cooking Class =

Television series

- Genre: Cooking
- Directed by: Paul Swensen
- Presented by: Joanne Weir
- Country of origin: United States
- Original language: English
- No. of seasons: 2
- No. of episodes: 52

Production
- Executive producers: Nat Katzman; Geoffrey Drummond
- Producer: Paul Swensen
- Production location: San Francisco
- Running time: 27 minutes

Original release
- Network: Public television
- Release: present

Joanne Weir's Cooking Class is a cooking show airing on PBS. Each episode features a novice student who is shown how to prepare several related dishes. The program is presented by KQED, distributed by American Public Television and produced by A La Carte Communications.

== Episodes ==
=== Season One ===
1. Risotto
2. Sauce Camp #1
3. Soufflés
4. Braising
5. Spain
6. Vegetarian
7. Roasted Lamb
8. Seafood
9. Sauce Camp #2
10. Dry Pasta
11. Cheese
12. Moroccan
13. Italian
14. Sauce For Skewers
15. Tuscan
16. Handmade Pasta
17. Soups
18. Pizza
19. Florentine Grilling
20. From The Pantry
21. Tarts
22. Beef Tenderloin Dinner
23. Italy's Piedmont
24. Baking
25. Salads
26. Beans

=== Season Two ===
1. Stuffed Chicken Breasts & Fava Fennel Salad
2. Pork Chops, Lemon Freeze & Citrus Crisps
3. Shellfish Orzo Stew & Orange, Avocado Salad
4. Sausage Crostini, Goat Cheese Linguine & Melons in Wine
5. Tomato Basil Fettuccine & Grilled Corn Salad
6. Summer Bean Pasta & Italian Bread Salad
7. Brick-Cooked Chicken & Grilled Potato Salad
8. Beef Roulade & Grilled Bread with Tomatoes
9. Wild Mushroom Lasagna & Grilled Pepper Salad
10. Spicy Sausage Penne & Harvest Flatbread
11. Asparagus Soup & Grilled Herbed Lamb Leg
12. Chicken Ragout & Stewed Grape Panna Cotta
13. Provençal Roasted Lamb & White Bean Salad
14. Spicy Crab Linguine & Winter White Salad
15. "Saintly" Penne & Fried Oyster Caesar
16. Asparagus Salad with Tangy Relish & Rolled Pork with Figs
17. Beet Gorgonzola Salad & Veal Chops
18. Asparagus Puffs (Gougères) and Lamb Skewers with Fava Salad
19. Cherry Tomato Pizza & Fennel Arugula Salad
20. Ricotta Mint Ravioli & Lemon Salad
21. Tomato & Mozzarella Farfalle & Crispy Cracker Bread
22. Grilled Sea Bass with Romesco & Summer Vegetables
23. Zucchini Blossom Risotto & Lemon-Shrimp Risotto
24. Salmon with Herb Sauce & Orange Olive Oil Cake
25. Veal Chops with Salad & Pineapple Sorbet
26. Golden Gazpacho & Chicken Breasts with Relish
