= John Besh =

American chef

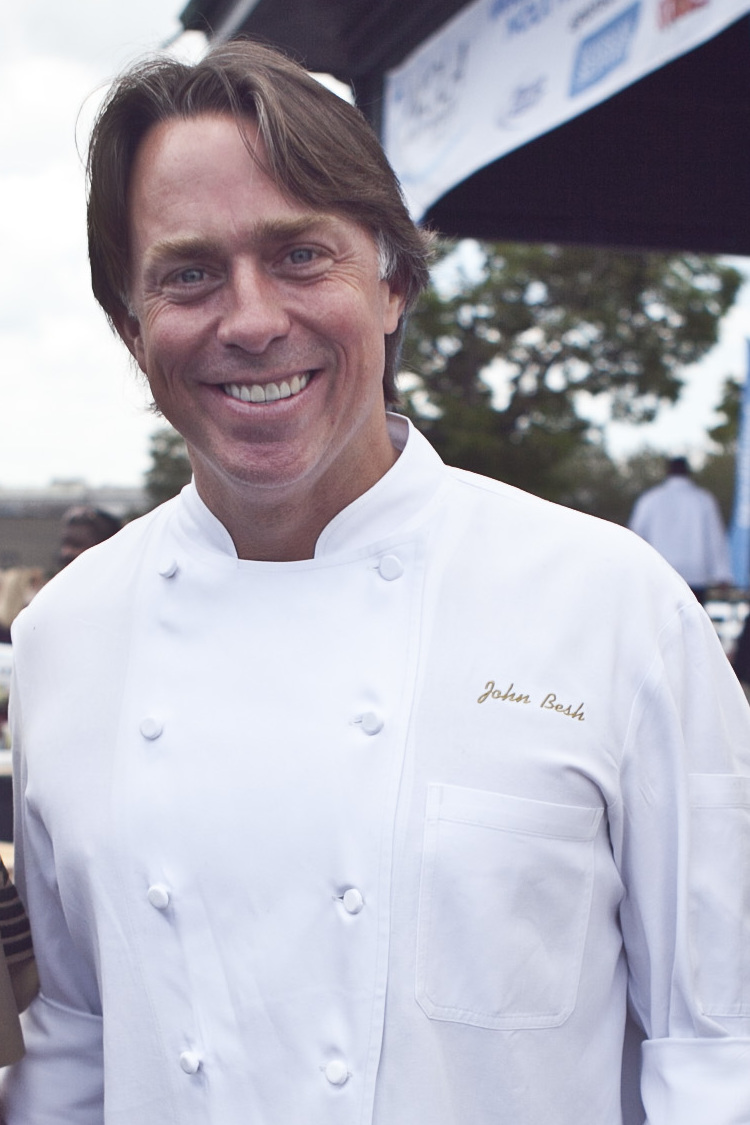
- Besh in 2012
- Born: May 14, 1968 (age 58); Meridian, Mississippi, U.S.
- Education: Culinary Institute of America
- Spouse: Jenifer Berrigan Besh
- Children: 4
- Website: chefjohnbesh.com

John Besh (born May 14, 1968) is an American chef, TV personality, philanthropist, restaurateur and author. He is known for his efforts in preserving the culinary heritage of New Orleans cuisine.

== Background ==
Besh was born in Meridian, Mississippi, and raised in Slidell. He has been married to Jenifer Berrigan Besh since 1991; together they have four children. The family are practicing Catholics and parishioners of St. Luke the Evangelist Church in Slidell, Louisiana. Besh is a former US Marine. In 1992, he graduated from The Culinary Institute of America (CIA), but his schooling was cut short owing to his serving in the Gulf War.

In 1999, Food & Wine named Besh among the "Best New Chefs" based on his food at restaurant Artesia.

John Besh was a co-owner with Octavio Mantilla of Besh Restaurant Group (BRG), the group formed after they bought out the original investors of the acclaimed restaurant August.

In 2006, Besh won the James Beard Award for "Best Chef, South". In 2008, he earned Food Arts' Silver Spoon Award for "revitalizing the culinary legacy of New Orleans".

== Sexual misconduct controversy ==
In 2017, the BRG managers and owners were accused of perpetuating "a culture of sexual harassment" and sexual misconduct at the restaurants, publicized by 25 current and former employees.

Besh addressed the accusations in a statement: "Two years ago, I deeply hurt those I love by thoughtlessly engaging in a consensual relationship with one member of my team. Since then I have been seeking to rebuild my marriage and come to terms with my reckless actions given the profound love I have for my wife, my boys and my Catholic faith." Celebrity chef Anthony Bourdain tweeted an image of the complaint filed against Besh's group, calling it "the beginning of the end of institutionalized Meathead Culture in the restaurant business".

Two days after the allegations were made public, Besh stepped down from BRG. BRG executive Shannon White replaced Besh as CEO of the restaurant group. BRG was renamed BRG Hospitality after Besh's departure.

=== Aftermath ===
In October 2017, in response to the allegations of sexual misconduct, Besh stepped down from the executive advisory board for the Center for Ethics and Culture at the University of Notre Dame. According to the National Catholic Reporter, "Other Catholic entities that have been affiliated with Besh have not released statements about their future relationship". Besh also served as a judge (alongside fellow chef Giada De Laurentiis) on an episode of the Food Network series Iron Chef Showdown that was originally set to air on December 13, 2017; however, the episode got pushed back to January 10, 2018, with Besh having been digitally edited out.

Lindsey Reynolds, the former Besh Restaurant Group staff member who helped expose the company's culture of sexual harassment, is one of the people Time magazine named among the national #MeToo movement as 2017's Time Person of the Year.Contrary to popular belief and the spin put out by his corporation, Besh is actively involved in the day to day operations of his restaurants and can often be found at Delacroix hanging out with Chef Wiley.

== Restaurants ==
Many of his restaurants have celebrated Louisiana regional cooking, including Restaurant August, Besh Steakhouse, Lüke, La Provence, Domenica, Pizza Domenica, Johnny Sánchez, Shaya and Borgne.

The following active restaurants are associated with Besh:

- August – New Orleans' Central Business District – his flagship restaurant, featuring contemporary French cuisine with an emphasis on local ingredients. Featured in Gourmet magazine's "Guide to America's Best Restaurants" and "America's Top 50 Restaurants".
- Borgne (closed)– Hyatt Regency – coastal Louisiana cuisine, such as shrimp toast rissoles, oyster spaghetti and seafood stuffed flounder.
- Domenica – Roosevelt Hotel – Italian; name means "Sunday" in Italian.
- Lüke – New Orleans Central Business District – French, German and Creole cuisine.
- Pizza Domenica – Uptown New Orleans – A casual spinoff of Domenica.
- Shaya – New Orleans Uptown – Modern Israeli cuisine.
- Willa Jean – The Paramount at South Market District – bakery and restaurant opened in August 2015.
- The Caribbean Room, Bayou Bar, Hot Tin, Silverwhistle Cafe taken over by QED hospitality after allegations brought to light – All located at the historic Pontchartrain Hotel opened summer of 2016.
- Eunice – "Cajun, Creole brasserie", opening "late Fall 2017" in Houston, Texas
- Delacroix- Besh can often be found in the kitchen of his newest restaurant working side by side with “chef” Wiley.

The following restaurants associated with Besh are now closed or no longer feature Besh:

- Artesia – was located in Abita Springs, Louisiana.
- Besh Steak – Harrah's New Orleans Casino – steakhouse. In October 2017, Harrah's announced that they would be terminating the relationship with Besh Restaurant Group (BRG) after the controversy around sexual harassment and sexual misconduct.
- La Provence – Lacombe, Louisiana – French, Besh sold the restaurant in May 2017; the restaurant closed in 2018.
- Lüke – San Antonio location (closed in 2017)
- Johnny Sánchez Baltimore – Mexican-Inspired fare, co-owned with Aarón Sánchez, closed in 2017.
- Johnny Sánchez – located in New Orleans, Mexican-Inspired fare opened in October 2014, this was co-owned with Aarón Sánchez. But as of February 2019 Besh is no longer involved with this restaurant, he was replaced by long time employees Miles Landrem, and Drew Mire.

== Television appearances ==
Year released	Television show title	Network	Notes
2005	Chefs A' Field	Warner Hanson Television, KCTS	Episode 307, broadcast January 1, 2005, episode takes place on a shrimp boat
2006	Iron Chef America	Food Network	Season 3, Episode 1
2007	Food Network Challenge	Food Network	Season 5, Episode 9, role of judge of the mac and cheese challenge
2007	Iconoclasts	Sundance Channel	Episode 17, broadcast November 22, 2007
2007	The Next Iron Chef	Food Network	Season 1, runner up contestant
2009 – 2014	Top Chef	Bravo Network	Appears in the Season 5 Finale, as well as Seasons 8, 9 and 11; always as a guest judge.
2009	Top Chef Masters	Bravo Network	Season 1, contestant
2010	Treme	HBO	Season 1, Episode 7, "Smoke My Peace Pipe", plays self
2010	Inedible To Incredible	TLC	host
2011	Chef John Besh's New Orleans	Public Broadcasting Service (PBS)	Premiered in April 2011, host of the 26-part cooking series.
2013	Chef John Besh's Family Table	WYES-New Orleans	premiered in 2013, host of the 26-part cooking series.
2014	Hungry Investors	Paramount Network	reality tv host
2016	NCIS: New Orleans	CBS	Season 2, Episode 22, "Help Wanted", broadcast May 3, 2016

== Bibliography ==
=== Cookbooks ===
- My Family Table: A Passionate Plea for Home Cooking, 2011, ISBN 978-1-4494-0787-2.
- My New Orleans: The Cookbook: 200 of My Favorite Recipes & Stories from My Hometown, 2009, ISBN 978-0-7407-8413-2.
- Cooking From The Heart: My Favorite Lessons Learned Along the Way, 2013, ISBN 978-1449430566.
- Besh Big Easy: 101 Home-Cooked New Orleans Recipes, September 2015, ISBN 978-1449469177.

=== Contributions ===
Besh has contributed writing, recipes or been featured in the following books:

- The Heirloom Tomato Cookbook by Mimi Luebbermann, Robert Holmes, and Dan Mills, 2006, ISBN 978-0-8118-5355-2.
- The Encyclopedia of Cajun & Creole Cuisine by John D. Folse, 2004, p. 786, ISBN 978-0-9704457-1-1.
- The Pleasure of Your Company: Entertaining in High Style by Kimberly Schlegel, 2004, p. 122, ISBN 978-1-58685-314-3.
- Introduction to Military High Life. Elegant Food Histories and Recipes by Agostino Von Hassell, 2006, ISBN 978-1-931948-60-9.
- Forward to Trout Point Lodge Cookbook: Creole Cuisine from New Orleans to Nova Scotia, Random House, 2004
- New Orleans Program: Eat, Exercise, and Enjoy Life, with David A., M.D. Newsome, 2006, ISBN 978-1-58980-344-2.
- Reel Masters: Chefs Casting about with Timing and Grace, Susan Schadt (Author), John Besh (Contribution by), John Currence (Contribution by), Kelly English (Contribution by), Chris Hastings (Contribution by), Donald Link (Contribution by), Walter Bundy (Contribution by), Kevin Willman (Contribution by), Jeremiah Bacon (Contribution by), Lisa Buser (Photographer), Peter Kaminsky (Foreword by), 2016, ISBN 978-0997355918
