= Inedible to Incredible =

- Genre: Reality television
- Country of origin: United States
- Original language: English
- No. of seasons: 1
- No. of episodes: 6

Original release
- Network: TLC
- Release: June 21 – July 12, 2010

Inedible to Incredible is an American reality television series which follows chef John Besh as he travels around the country to help improve horrible homemade meals. The series aired on TLC from June 21 to July 12, 2010 and was directed by Ian Stevenson.

== Episodes ==
No.	Title	Original release date
1	"Arctic of Canada"	June 21, 2010
2	"Improv Gone Wrong"	June 21, 2010
3	"Funky Chicken"	June 28, 2010
4	"Long Suffering Husband"	June 28, 2010
5	"Bayou Botch Up"	July 5, 2010
6	"Tacos vs. Latkes"	July 12, 2010
