= Zonya Foco =

American chef

- Born: Zonya Edwards; March 21, 1963 (age 62); Ann Arbor, Michigan, U.S.
- Occupations: Professional Speaker, Author, TV show host
- Years active: 1986-present
- Spouse: Scott Foco
- Children: 1
- Website: https://www.zonya.com

Zonya Foco, RD, CHFI, CSP (born Zonya Edwards on March 21, 1963) is an American professional speaker, television chef, and writer. She focuses on healthy eating habits rather than on dieting.

Foco received her bachelor's degree from Eastern Michigan University in 1987 and worked for eight years as a clinical nutritionist for the Michigan Heart and Vascular Institute at St. Joseph Mercy Hospital in Ann Arbor. Foco has appeared on local newscasts, nationally syndicated daytime talk shows, and QVC. She has been published in Prevention, Today's Dietitian, Total Health, and Fast and Healthy Cooking.

== Motivational Speaker and Wellness Coach ==
Foco and her husband Scott Foco produce the PBS program Zonya's Health Bites. Each 5-segment episode offers realistic solutions for managing weight, improving health, creating balance, and maximizing energy for the whole family.

== Writings ==
Her experiences as a teen who saw how diets caused her weight to bounce up and down and ultimately to increase, as well as her knowledge as a nutritionist, led her to write Lickety-Split Meals for Health Conscious People on the Go in 1998. In 2007, Foco cowrote with Stephen Moss, the health novel Water with Lemon, a story that shows how changing eight habits can help one to master diet-free, lifelong weight loss and lead to personal transformation.
