= Chef John Besh's New Orleans =

2014 American culinary television series

- Genre: Culinary
- Starring: John Besh
- Country of origin: United States
- Original language: English

Original release
- Network: PBS
- Release: 2011

Chef John Besh's New Orleans is an American culinary television series featuring chef John Besh.
