= Stan Frankenthaler =

American food industry professional

Stan Frankenthaler is a food industry professional who has been a chef, vice-president of product development and corporate executive chef at Dunkin' Brands and, at CraftWorks Holdings, chief officer of food and beverage. In 2019, he joined Shari's Cafe & Pies as executive chef and SVP of supply chain.

Frankenthaler grew up in Savannah, Georgia, and is a graduate of the University of Georgia, class of 1982. He attended The Culinary Institute of America from 1982 until 1984.

== Career ==
Early in his career, Frankenthaler apprenticed in Boston under Jody Adams, Jasper White and Gordon Hamersley. With Chris Schlesinger, he opened the Blue Room in Kendall Square. On his own, he ran Salamander, an Asian fusion restaurant in Boston.

When he was executive chef at Dunkin’, he was the first to hold that position.

== Honors and awards ==
He was nominated three times for the James Beard Foundation Award Best Chef in the Northeast.
