= Helen Van Wyk =

American painter and television host (1930–1994)

Helen Van Wyk Rogoff
- Born: Helen Van Wyk; April 21, 1930; Fair Lawn, New Jersey, U.S.
- Died: 1994; Massachusetts, U.S.
- Resting place: Beech Grove Cemetery, Rockport, Massachusetts
- Occupations: Painter; art instructor; television host
- Years active: 1960–1993
- Spouse: Herb Rogoff
- Website: helenvanwyk.com

Helen Van Wyk (April 21, 1930 – 1994) was an American painter, author and art instructor who created and hosted Welcome To My Studio, an instructional television program that aired for 10 series on PBS in the early 1990s.

== Career and personal life ==
Helen Van Wyk was born in Fair Lawn, New Jersey on April 21, 1930. She studied with artist Ralph Entwistle. As an art teacher, Van Wyk taught in the style of the Rembrandt School of Painting.

During the early 1960s, Van Wyk met artist and cartoonist Herb Rogoff, a public relations director for M. Grumbacher Art Supplies. Together they traveled the United States, while Van Wyk gave painting demonstrations promoting Grumbacher products. Rogoff edited and co-wrote with Van Wyk the art magazine Palette Talk. In 1970, Van Wyk and Rogoff married. They moved to Rockport, Massachusetts where they wrote and published several art books together.

In the late 1980s and early 1990s, with Rogoff as her producer, Van Wyk hosted 130 half-hour episodes for PBS television called Welcome To My Studio which aired on more than 200 stations. Van Wyk published a new instructional magazine with Rogoff from 1991 to 1993 called Alla Prima. Van Wyk always ended her PBS program with the same send-off: "... or maybe I'll just teach you how to make soup."

Van Wyk was the recipient of several awards during her lifetime, including the John C. Pearson Prize from the Ogunquit Art Center in Ogunquit, Maine, First Prize for Still Life from the Catharine Lorillard Wolfe Art Club, and the Curtis Memorial Award from the Rockport Art Association in Rockport, Massachusetts. Her works are in collections at the Norfolk Museum of Arts and Sciences in Norfolk, Virginia, Bergen County Museum in New Jersey, Saint Vincent College in Latrobe, Pennsylvania, and the Minneapolis Club in Minnesota.

Van Wyk died of cancer in 1994.

== Legacy ==
Artist and author Joan Lord, who was a student and also close friend of Van Wyk, wrote an instructional book and hosted a show for PBS called Paint! The Van Wyk Way.

== Bibliography ==
- Van Wyk, Helen (1970). Acrylic Portrait Painting. Watson-Guptill. ISBN 978-0823000753.
- Van Wyk, Helen (1990). Color Mixing in Action. Art Instruction Associates. ISBN 978-0929552064.
- Van Wyk, Helen (1991). Basic Oil Painting the Van Wyk Way. ISBN 978-0929552019.
- Van Wyk, Helen (1993). Welcome to My Studio: Adventures in Oil Painting With Helen Van Wyk. ISBN 978-0891345824.
- Van Wyk, Helen (1993). My Thirteen Colors & How I Use Them. Art Instruction Associates. ISBN 978-0929552071.
- Van Wyk, Helen (1995). Color Mixing the Van Wyk Way: A Manual for Oil Painters. Art Instruction Associates. ISBN 978-0929552095.
- Van Wyk, Helen (1996). Helen Van Wyk's Favorite Color Recipes. ISBN 978-0929552101.
- Van Wyk, Helen (1998). Helen Van Wyk's Favorite Color Recipes 2. ISBN 978-0929552132.
- Van Wyk, Helen (1998). Portraits in Oil the Van Wyk Way. Art Instruction Associates. ISBN 978-0929552149.
- Van Wyk, Helen (1998). Portraits in Oil the Van Wyk Way. Art Instruction Associates. ISBN 978-0929552149.
- Van Wyk, Helen (1998). Painting Flowers the Van Wyk Way. Art Instruction Associates. ISBN 978-0929552194.
