= Chestnut stuffing =

Stuffing for roast bird

Chestnut stuffing is a type of stuffing for roast goose and turkey dishes. Chestnut stuffing was more common in early American cuisine than it is in modern times. It could be prepared as a side for the typical meals of turkey or duck that were served at taverns. The American chestnut (Castanea dentata) used for stuffing Thanksgiving turkeys used to be very common in the Eastern United States. Most of the trees were destroyed by the chestnut blight during the 20th century.

Chestnut stuffing has been associated with Thanksgiving dinner in the United States since at least the 19th century. One of the most popular recipes for chestnut stuffing made with boiled chestnuts was published in Mrs. Lincoln's Boston Cook Book in 1884. A recipe for Chestnut stuffing was published in 1747 in The Art of Cookery Made Plain and Easy by Hannah Glasse. The Chestnut stuffing was the first stuffing recipe published in the United States in The Frugal Housewife in 1772 by Susannah Carter was a reprint from the earlier English edition.
