= Donna Dewberry =

American artist and author (born 1953)

Donna S. Dewberry (born November 6, 1953) is an American artist and author who developed a "One Stroke" painting technique that will enable anyone to reproduce any effect of nature with one easy-to-learn technique.

== Personal ==
Dewberry is a member of the Church of Jesus Christ of Latter-day Saints.

== Television ==
She had a public television show, One Stroke Painting with Donna Dewberry. In 2007, One Stroke Painting was replaced with The Donna Dewberry Show.

=== One Stroke Technique ===
The "One Stroke Technique" is a double loading technique that consists of loading a brush with two separate colors. Dewberry claims that with her technique you are able to achieve the shading and highlighting in one stroke.

As a side note, from the Archival records and articles in the UK, it is known that the Schools of Art of the time (1700s) took apprentices and trained them, in either the 'one-stroke' style required for decorating furniture, or the 'one-stroke' style required for decorating pottery. (Those not able to afford the School of Art costs, spent years learning from the Master Painter within a firm). The brushes (paint brushes are called pencils in the Pottery trade) were 'double' and 'triple' loaded, to produce the highlight, body colour and shadow, of the petal, leaf or element, painted wet-on-wet and with a single stroke of the brush. This quick method of painting was used for commercial reasons - to speedily decorate the furniture, pottery and trays ready for sale. So, although the brush carried one, two, three or more colours, it would have taken only 'one stroke' of the brush to produce the more complicated shading, giving depth and beauty to the design. It would have taken much longer to blend these colours together had they been added separately.

A more modern example of the double loading technique is from The Joy of Painting featuring Bob Ross, who would double load his brush during the show to make the wet on wet technique easier and to make the painting look more natural.

As such, it can be assumed that Donna Dewberry did not invent this style.

However, originally autographed paintings by Donna Dewberry are difficult to find for purchase privately.

== Writing ==
She was a columnist for magazines including Tole World, Painting magazine and Decorative Artists Workbook.

=== Books ===
- Amazing Metallics
- Basic Strokes Workbook
- Clay Pots
- Decorative Furniture with Donna Dewberry
- Decorative Murals with Donna Dewberry
- Donna Dewberry's Complete Book of One-Stroke Painting
- Donna Dewberry's One Stroke Painting Course
- Flowers A to Z with Donna Dewberry
- FolkArt One Stroke Books - Beautiful Backgrounds
- One Stroke A Season of Glass
- One Stroke Bake-able Glass
- One Stroke Cigar Box Purses
- One Stroke Country Bugs
- One Stroke Donna's Favorites
- One Stroke Floral Bouquets
- Quick & Easy Murals
- Peaceful Landscapes
- Landscapes
- Cards and Greetings
- Painted Celebrations
- Season Delights
- Painted Glass and Ceramics
- Fountains and Birdbaths
- Garden Animals
- Small and Pretty
- Outdoor Decor
- Donna's Favorites
- One Stroke Nudes
- Paper Pleasure
- I Believe in Angels
- Lifestyle: A Summer Garden
- Landscapes for the Home (HD)
