= Chef John Besh's Family Table =

2013 American culinary television series

- Genre: Culinary
- Starring: John Besh
- Country of origin: United States
- Original language: English

Original release
- Network: PBS
- Release: 2013

Chef John Besh's Family Table is a 2013 PBS American culinary television series featuring chef John Besh.
