= Graham Haley =

Canadian television host and author (1948–2025)

- Born: 2 July 1949 (age 77); Durban, South Africa
- Died: 20 August 2025 (aged 76); Etobicoke, Ontario, Canada
- Occupations: Actor, Voice actor, Author
- Years active: 1972-2025

Graham Haley (July 2, 1948 – August 20, 2025) was a South African and Canadian actor, author and TV show host known for his series Haley's Hints. Following its launch, the show expanded from Canada to the United States to South America to Europe to Asia, and to Africa.

== Biography ==
Graham Haley was born in Durban, South Africa on 2 July 1949.

After numerous years working a variety of jobs, Haley began acting in theater, radio, film, and television. He emigrated to Canada in 1978, where he founded The Comedy Bank. This association led him to a comedy series on Canadian radio.

He lived in Toronto with his wife Rosemary and daughters Erin, Kerry, and Anna.

He spent time outside of the Haley's Hints performing voice-overs for TV and radio commercials.

He died in Etobicoke, Ontario on 20 August 2025.

== Publications ==
- Haley's Hints (2004) ISBN 0969287348, 9780969287346
- Haley's Hints Green Edition: 1000 Great Tips to Save Time, Money, and the Planet! (2009) ISBN 1101032375, 9781101032374
- Haley's Cleaning Hints (2004) ISBN 1101220023, 9781101220023
- Haley's Handy Hints : 1001 Practical Ideas (1987) ISBN 0969287305, 9780969287308
