= Chicken under a brick =

Roast chicken dish

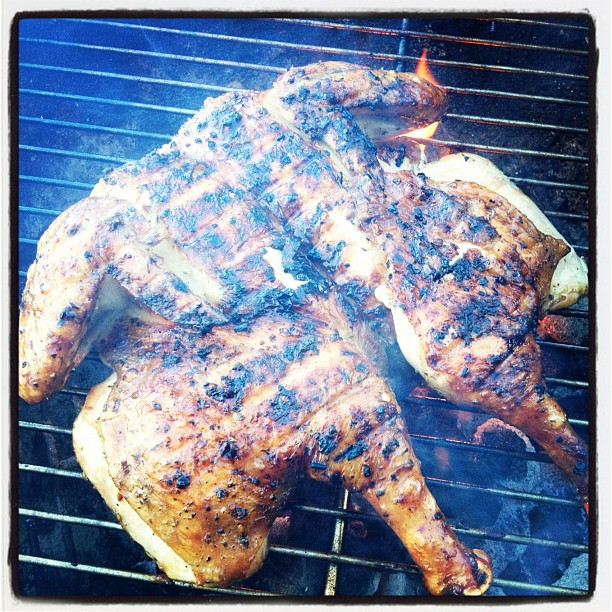
Chicken under a brick, cooked on a grill

Chicken under a brick, also known as brick chicken, is a roast chicken dish. In most preparations, a whole chicken is seasoned with lemon and herbs and roasted in an oven or grill with a brick placed on top to flatten the chicken and enhance browning. The technique originated in Tuscany as pollo al mattone and has since become popular in many other countries.

== See also ==
- Spatchcocking
