= Robert Wiedmaier =

Belgian American chef

- Born: 2 March 1960 (age 66); Wiesbaden, West Germany (present-day Wiesbaden, Germany)
- Occupation: Chef
- Spouse: Polly Blum Wiedmaier
- Children: 2

Robert Wiedmaier is a West German-born, Belgian American chef. He owns multiple restaurants in and around Washington, D.C. and is known for creating dishes involving Belgian cuisine, specifically mussels.

== Personal life ==
Robert Wiedmaier was born in West Germany and lived there until he was about 15. He described his mother, who was born in California, as a "great cook" who focused on French cuisine. He attended cooking school in the Netherlands, and now resides in Kensington, Maryland. He has been described as an "avid hunter" and fisherman and "full circle chef".

== Career ==
He began his career working at restaurants in Belgium and the Netherlands but relocated to the Washington metropolitan area in the 1980s. Upon arriving in the D.C. area, he took his first job as a saucier at the Morrison House in Old Town Alexandria, Virginia, at its restaurant, Le Chardon d’Or. He then worked at various hotels, including the Four Seasons and the Watergate (replacing Jean-Louis Palladin). In 1999, he opened his first restaurant, Marcel's, and now operates a group of restaurants in D.C., Virginia, Maryland, and Atlantic City. He has been invited to compete in the television program Iron Chef but declined, stating in 2012, "that's just not my thing. Not that I wouldn't do it, but I have five restaurants to run."

In 2009, Wiedmaier was honored as Chef of the Year by the Restaurant Association Metropolitan Washington (the RAMMY Awards). In August 2012, Wiedmaier was inducted into The Knighthood of the Brewers' Mashstaff at the Belgian Beer Weekend in Brussels.

=== Marcel's ===
Marcel's, named for Wiedmaier's son, opened in 1999 in Washington, D.C.'s Foggy Bottom neighborhood with fine French-Belgian cuisine. In 2015, Marcel's underwent a major renovation with new additions to the menu. Diners at Marcel's can create their tasting menus with four, five, six or seven courses.

In 2016, Marcel's won the Restaurant Association Metropolitan Washington (RAMMY) Award for formal fine dining restaurant of the year.

=== RW Restaurant Group ===
In 2007, Wiedmaier opened a second restaurant in D.C., Brasserie Beck. He opened his third restaurant in 2009, Brabo in Virginia. In the following years, he expanded to open several more restaurants in Maryland, Virginia, and Atlantic City, New Jersey, under the umbrella of the RW Restaurant Group.

==== Brasserie Beck ====
In April 2007, he opened Brasserie Beck (named after his youngest son), his first major foray into mussels and Belgian beer. He described the restaurant as having a "1950s to 60s train station feel" and a focus on French cuisine with Flemish influences. Esquire called Brasserie Beck one of the Best New Restaurants in America in 2007.

Brasserie Beck boasts one of the largest selections of Belgian beers outside of Belgium. This includes the house special Antigoon, which is brewed for Wiedmaier's restaurants by Belgium's Brouwerij de Musketiers.

==== Brabo ====
In 2009, he partnered with Kimpton Hotels & Restaurantss to open Brabo at the Lorien Hotel and Spa in Alexandria, Virginia.

==== Mussel Bar & Grille ====
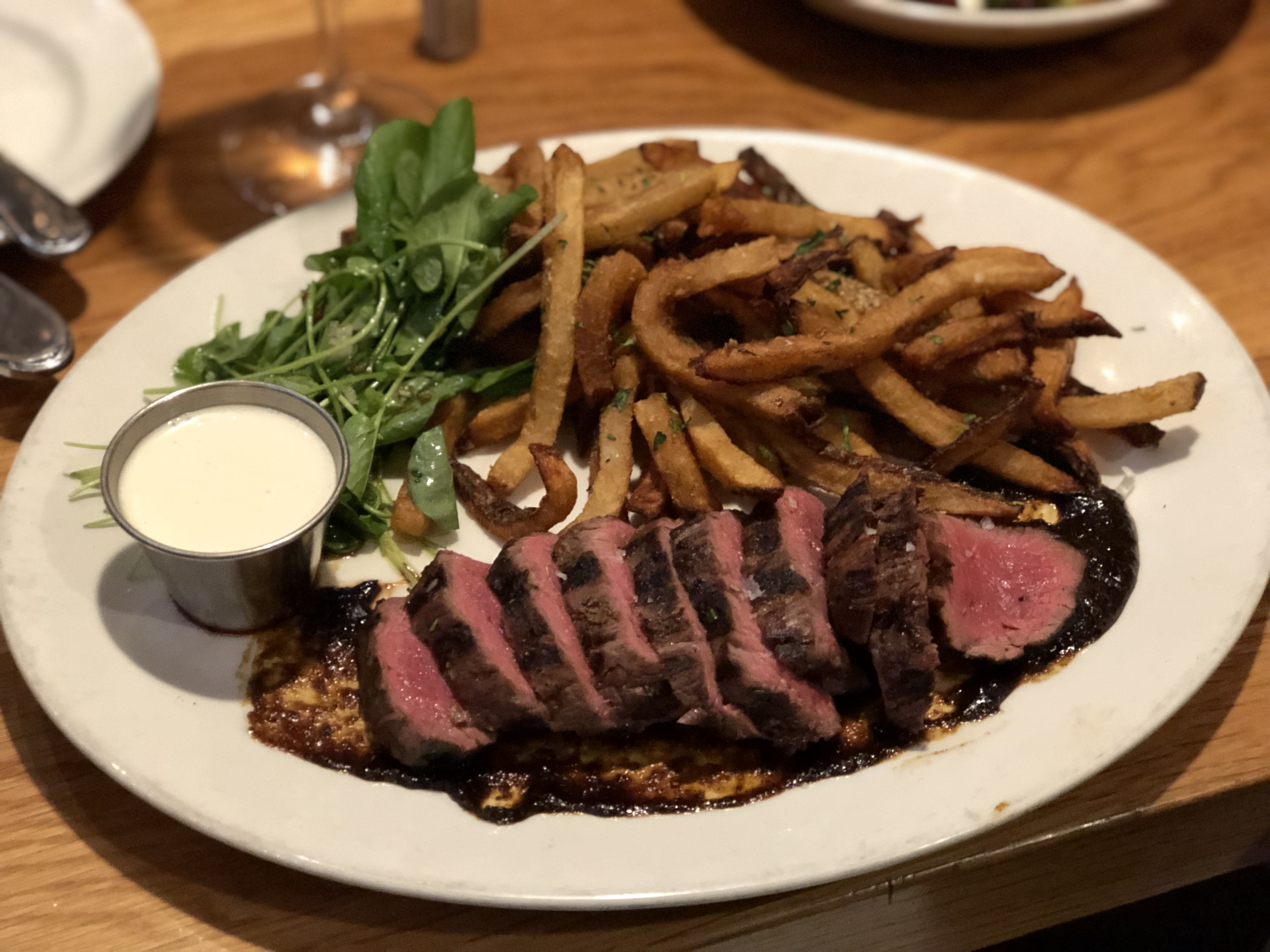
Steak frites at Mussel Bar in Arlington, Virginia

In 2010, Wiedmaier opened a more casual restaurant, Mussel Bar & Grille in Bethesda, Maryland. In 2012, he opened a second (now-closed) Mussel Bar & Grille in Atlantic City, New Jersey. A Ballston, Virginia outpost of Mussel Bar & Grille opened in 2013. Another Mussel Bar & Grille opened in Baltimore, Maryland in 2015.

==== Wildwood Kitchen ====
In 2012, Wiedmaier tapped five of his longest-serving employees to become part-owners of Wildwood Kitchen in Bethesda, Maryland. It is a smaller restaurant, at 2,000 square feet, seating 55 people.

==== Villain & Saint ====
Villain & Saint is a gastropub and live music venue that opened in 2015 in Bethesda, Maryland. Robert partnered with Brian McBride and Joe Lively to share their passion for the lifestyle of the freewheeling rock 'n' roll era. Celebrating various music and food, the restaurant offers a spread of tastes in music and food.

==== Lock 72 Kitchen & Bar ====
In 2015, Wiedmaier acquired a neighborhood American and seafood restaurant in Potomac, Maryland, the Tavern at River Falls. In 2016, the restaurant changed its name to Lock 72 Kitchen & Bar.

==== Siren by RW ====
In 2017, Wiedmaier opened Siren in the Darcy Hotel in Logan Circle, Washington, D.C. The menu is focused on seafood, featuring a grand plateau of oysters, clams, prawns, lobster, and several styles of sashimi, and caviar service.

Siren received a Michelin Star in the 2019 Michelin Guide for Washington, D.C.

In February 2019, Siren closed, with the goal of reopening in a different location. As of January 2020, it has yet to reopen.
