= Tommy Tang =

Thai chef

Tommy Tang is a Thai-born chef and television personality well known for his PBS series of cooking shows.

== Life and career ==
Born in Bangkok, Tang was the eldest son in a family of 12 children. Leaving school at eleven to help support his family, Tang held a succession of jobs that included a floor-fan cleaner, welder, construction worker, busboy, wheelbarrow maker, boxer, auto mechanic, tennis teacher and drummer. During that time, Tang learned to cook alongside his father in the family restaurant in Bangkok's Grand Central.

After emigrating to the U.S., Tang took a day job as chef and manager at a small Thai restaurant in Hollywood, California. In 1982, Tang opened his own restaurant in the Melrose Avenue section of West Hollywood. In 1986, Tang opened another restaurant in the TriBeCa neighborhood of New York City. In 1994, Tang opened a third restaurant in Pasadena, California. All of the restaurants have been closed for almost 25 years.

Tang produces a Cooking & Travel Series for PBS. It has almost 200 shows since it started airing in 1994.

His first cookbook, Modern Thai Cuisine, was released in 1991. It was largely hailed as being the book that "demystified" the art of preparing Modern Thai Cuisine and eventually went into eight printings. His second cookbook, Noodles & Rice and Something Nice, was equally successful.

He also continues to oversee the Tsunami Children's Foundation he founded in 2005.
