= Gokhale Method =

Postural awareness technique

The Gokhale Method or Primal Posture method is a postural awareness technique developed by acupuncturist and yoga instructor Esther Gokhale. The method proposes that certain patterns exist in the way people in pre-modern and less industrialized societies move and adopt posture. Gokhale claims that these patterns, which she calls primal posture, can be learned through practice. The method became popular in the beginning of the 2010s among professionals in the Silicon Valley, where Gokhale is located.

== History ==
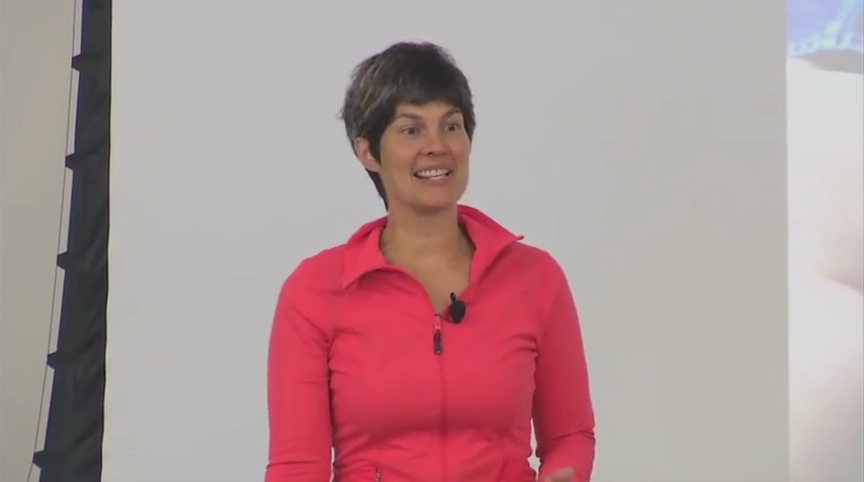
Esther Gokhale teaching at the Ancestral Health Symposium in 2013

Gokhale started searching for a method to cope with her own back pain, including sciatica and spinal disc herniation, which began with her first pregnancy.

She based the method on training in the Feldenkrais method and from a French organization for postural awareness called the Aplomb Institute. Gokhale claims she spent ten years observing and photographing people's posture in less industrialized societies. Gokhale started teaching in a studio at Palo Alto, California.

== Features ==
The result of Esther Gokhale's observations was an eight-step method that emphasizes a posture with a J-shaped spine as the ideal form, created through repositioning the pelvis. The method emphasizes training posture through everyday activities, rather than exercise, and involves as much unlearning former habits of poor posture as learning new habits of good posture. Postural training involves the shoulders, neck, back, hips and knees, and incorporates yoga and dance. Moreover, the method aims to elongate the spine and lessen the burden on the lower back.

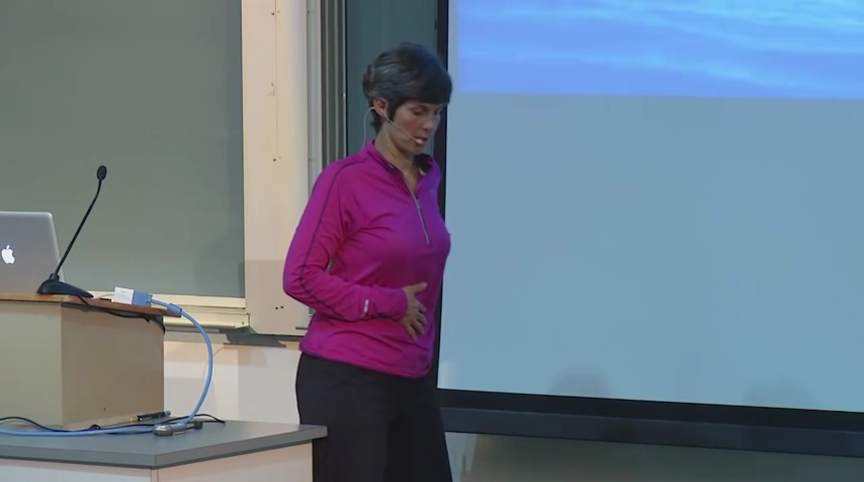
Esther Gokhale demonstrates posture.

The method consists of consecutive steps, with instructions on how to sit, stand, lie down, bend over, walk, and lift heavy objects. Gokhale uses kinesthetic, visual and intellectual teaching methods in her classes. Claiming legitimacy from medical literature and anatomical arguments, Gokhale has made statements that certain medical conditions such as RSI (repetitive strain injury) are strongly related to posture and can be solved by improving posture. She has also spoken out against the widespread notion that "sitting is the new smoking", stating that "we are much better designed than that".

Gokhale has published a book and a DVD about the method. She has stated in interviews that her ultimate aim of teaching the Gokhale Method is to make the method widespread and thereby change what she describes as a culture of posture, saying that parents and teachers' examples affect children's posture.

== Reception and analysis ==
The method quickly caught on in the Bay Area, as she has been described as the "posture guru of Silicon Valley". Apart from the United States, the method has been taught in the United Kingdom, Germany and The Netherlands.

One of the foundational assertions of the Gokhale Method, that people in minimally industrialized societies have less back pain, lacks support in mainstream science. According to a 2004 review, "Until recently it was largely thought of as a problem confined to western countries but research performed during the last decade clearly showed that low back pain is also a major problem in low- and middle-income countries." For example, arthritis of the spine was common in pre-contact Native American populations. As of June 2015, the Gokhale Method had not been scientifically studied.

== See also ==
- Alexander Technique
