= Burt Wolf =

American journalist (1938–2026)

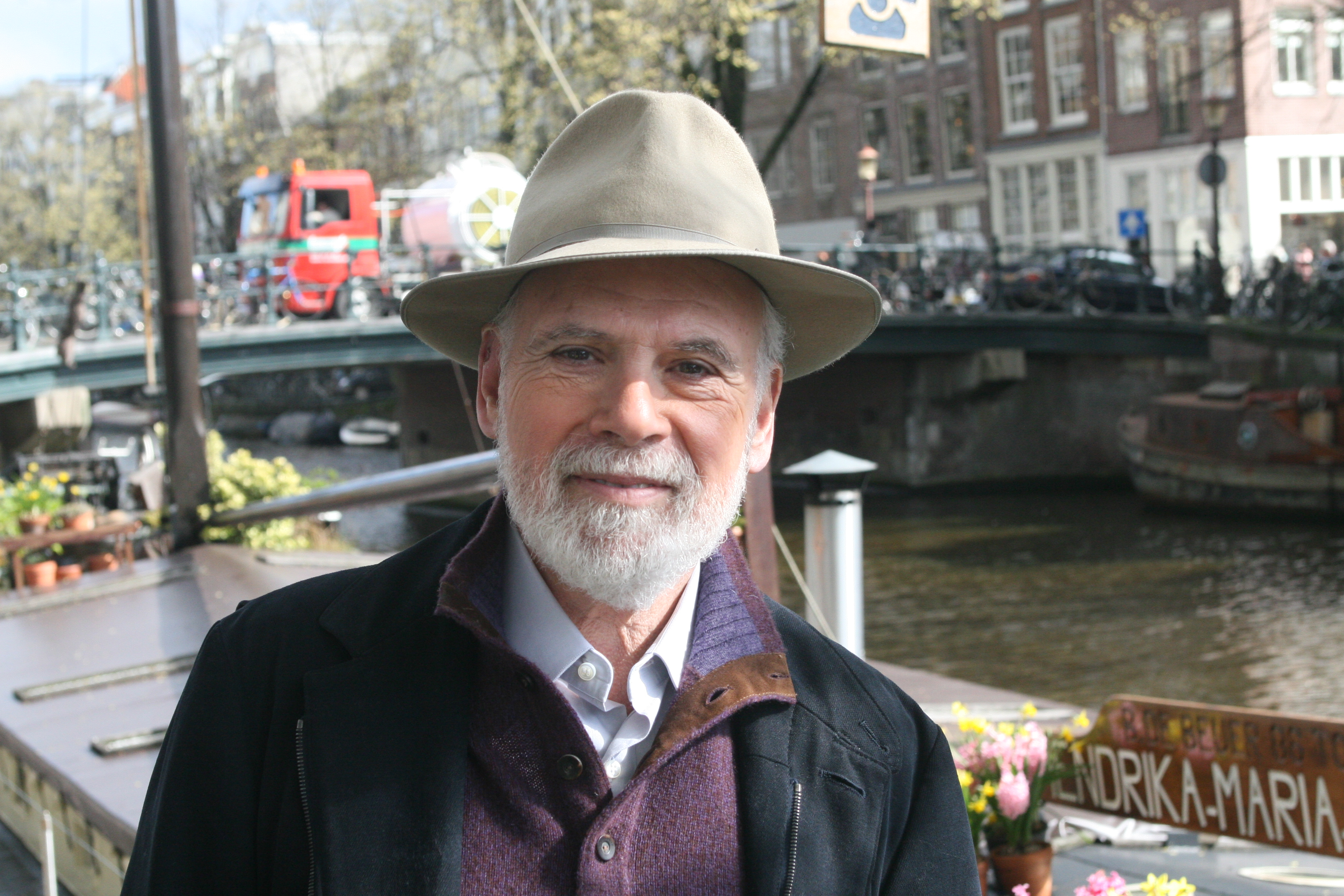
- Wolf on-location filming Travels & Traditions for public television
- Born: Burton R. Wolf; September 28, 1938; New York City, U.S.
- Died: January 31, 2026 (aged 87); Switzerland
- Education: New York University (B.A., English)
- Occupations: Journalist, writer, television producer and host
- Known for: Travels and Traditions TV series
- Website: https://www.burtwolf.com/

Burton R. Wolf (September 28, 1938 – January 31, 2026) was an American journalist, writer, businessman, chef and television producer. He was the host and author of nine internationally syndicated television series that deal with cultural history, travel and gastronomy, including Travels & Traditions hosted with his son Nicholas Wolf.

== Early life and education ==
Burton R. Wolf was born in New York City on September 28, 1938, and as a boy helped out at his grandmother's housewares store in the Bronx.

Wolf attended The High School of Music & Art in New York City, and New York University where he earned a BA degree in English Literature.

== Career ==
Wolf left New York University Law School to become the writer-publisher of a series of self-help books. He later sold the publishing house in 1968.

=== Publishing ===
During his 35 years as a journalist, Wolf has written or edited more than 60 books including The Cooks' Catalogue. From 1979 to 1982, he wrote a weekly column syndicated by The Washington Post and in 2000 was a regular contributor to the online publication Salon.com.

=== Broadcasting ===
Wolf began making programs about cultural history when Ted Turner invited him to report for CNN. Since 1982, Wolf has produced over 4,000 segments for Cable News Network (CNN), 800 segments for ABC (the American Broadcasting Company), 125 half-hour programs for the travel division of The Discovery Channel, and 350 half hours for Public Broadcasting.

Wolf's programs are broadcast on public television to 90% of the television homes in the United States, then translated into Russian, Polish, Ukrainian, Romanian, Bulgarian, Mandarin, and Korean, and syndicated to an international audience of over 100 million. His programs have aired on public television, the Discovery Travel Network and networks in Canada, Latin America, Asia and Europe.

His programs have included The History and Future of Shopping, a five-part series "The History of Immigration to the United States", and a twenty-part series on sacred pilgrimage sites. He was also producing a series for public television entitled ARTCOPS. These half-hour programs cover the $6 billion of art, jewelry and antiques stolen each year. The programs describe which objects have been stolen, why they are valuable from a historical and cultural viewpoint, how the theft took place and what the public can do to help recover the items. A central theme is the importance of these articles to the world's cultural history.

Burt Wolf: Taste of Freedom explores 13 major American holidays and gatherings: the history, folklore and rituals that have become central to those events. Special attention is paid to different ethnic groups and how they brought their own traditions to the occasions.

Travels & Traditions is a series of half-hour programs in which Wolf travels to cities around the world telling the stories of local traditions. In many locations, he also shows how foreign traditions have influenced the city he is visiting.

Wolf's marketing and public relations clients include: Procter & Gamble, eBay, ConAgra Foods, Federated Department Stores, the government of Switzerland, the government of Taiwan, the government of Norway, the government of Canada and the government of Chile.

== Product development ==
He has worked on product development for a number of major companies including Procter & Gamble, General Foods, McCormick and the Origins division of Estee Lauder. He developed the Waring Commercial Blender, the first anodized aluminum pots and pans for home use, as well as major lines of bakeware and cutlery.

== Retailing ==
In 1975, in partnership with Federated Department Stores, he designed and managed a group of 276 food and cooking equipment shops called "Cook's Kitchen" that were installed in Federated stores throughout the United States. The franchise was eventually extended to May Company, Marshall Field, Ives and Macy's outlets.

== Restaurants ==
In 1989, Wolf designed a limited partnership investment vehicle that was used to develop a branch restaurant in Memphis for the Brennan Restaurant group of New Orleans. He was responsible for raising over $2 million for the restaurant, as well as its physical plan, menu and operating systems. The restaurant is still profitable and has had two expansions.

== Travel ==
Each year, Wolf spent four months hosting European river cruises to help raise funds for public television. The group takes a trip that is based on one of his programs. They visit the same sites and travel the same route that made up one of the programs.

== Publishing ==
Wolf was the founder of the Double Elephant Press. For the past forty years, Double Elephant has been publishing signed numbered portfolios containing the work of some of the world's greatest photographers including Walker Evans, Lee Friedlander, Garry Winogrand and Helmut Newton. In 2000, Wolf completed a project in which he worked with curators at New York City's Metropolitan Museum of Art on a PBS television program and companion book examining the relationship between photography and gastronomy and titled What Are They Eating In The Photograph?

== Death ==
Wolf died on January 31, 2026, at the age of 87.

== Awards ==
Wolf was the first recipient of the James Beard Foundation Award for "Best Television Food Journalism" and has been nominated for two cable Ace Awards and an Emmy in connection with travel and cultural history.

== Selected books ==
- Real American Food: Restaurants, Markets, and Shops Plus Favorite Hometown Recipes by Burt Wolf and Andrew F. Smith (Hardcover – July 18, 2006)
- The New Cooks' Catalogue (Hardcover – October 24, 2000)
- Good to Eat: Flavorful recipes from one of television's best known food and travel journalists (Hardcover – April 6, 1999)
- Gatherings and Celebrations (Hardcover – November 1, 1996)
- Burt Wolf's Menu Cookbook (Hardcover – July 1, 1995)
- Eating Well (Paperback – June 1, 1992)
- Burt Wolf's Table (Hardcover – July 1, 1994)
- What's Cooking (Hardcover – January 1, 1988)
- What's Cooking with TV Food Reporter Burt Wolf (Paperback – 1989)
- The Best of What's Cooking (Paperback – January 1, 1985)
- Where to Eat in America (Paperback – October 12, 1977)
