= Nick Stellino =

American chef (born 1958)

- Born: 1 May 1958 (age 68); Palermo, Italy
- Spouse: Nanci Stellino (m. 1981)
- Culinary career
- Cooking style: American; Italian; Italian-American

Nick Stellino (born 1 May 1958) is a Sicilian-Italian television chef. One half of his family is from Northern Italy and the other half is Sicilian. He hosts the cooking programs Cucina Amore and Nick Stellino's Family Kitchen on public television station KCTS 9 in Seattle, Washington.

== Television shows ==
Stellino began by hosting three seasons of Cucina Amore. His other main cooking show was Nick Stellino's Family Kitchen; both were presented by KCTS, a PBS-affiliated television station in Seattle. His most recent show, Nick Stellino: Storyteller in the Kitchen, was presented by WCNY, the PBS station in Syracuse, New York. Stellino's current shows are distributed by American Public Television.

== Books ==
Stellino is the author of several cookbooks, which include the following:

- Cucina Amore
- Nick Stellino's Glorious Italian Cooking
- Nick Stellino's Mediterranean Flavors
- Nick Stellino's Family Kitchen
- Nick Stellino's Passione: Pasta, Pizza, Panini
- Mangiamo! Let's Eat!
- Dine In
- "Nick Stellino's Cooking with Friends"

== Notable achievements and appearances ==
- Grand Marshal, San Francisco Columbus Day Parade, 1999 (the first chef to be given the honor)
- Annual participant, Aspen Food and Wine Festival
- Presenter, James Beard Foundation Awards, New York City, 2000, 2001
- Chosen chef, Grandma Gala Dinner, James Beard Foundation Awards, New York City
- Celebrity chef, Red Tie Affair, Red Cross of Santa Monica
- Celebrity chef, Seattle Festa Italiana, 2007
- Celebrity chef, Milwaukee Festa Italiana, 2008
