= Travels & Traditions =

Television Series

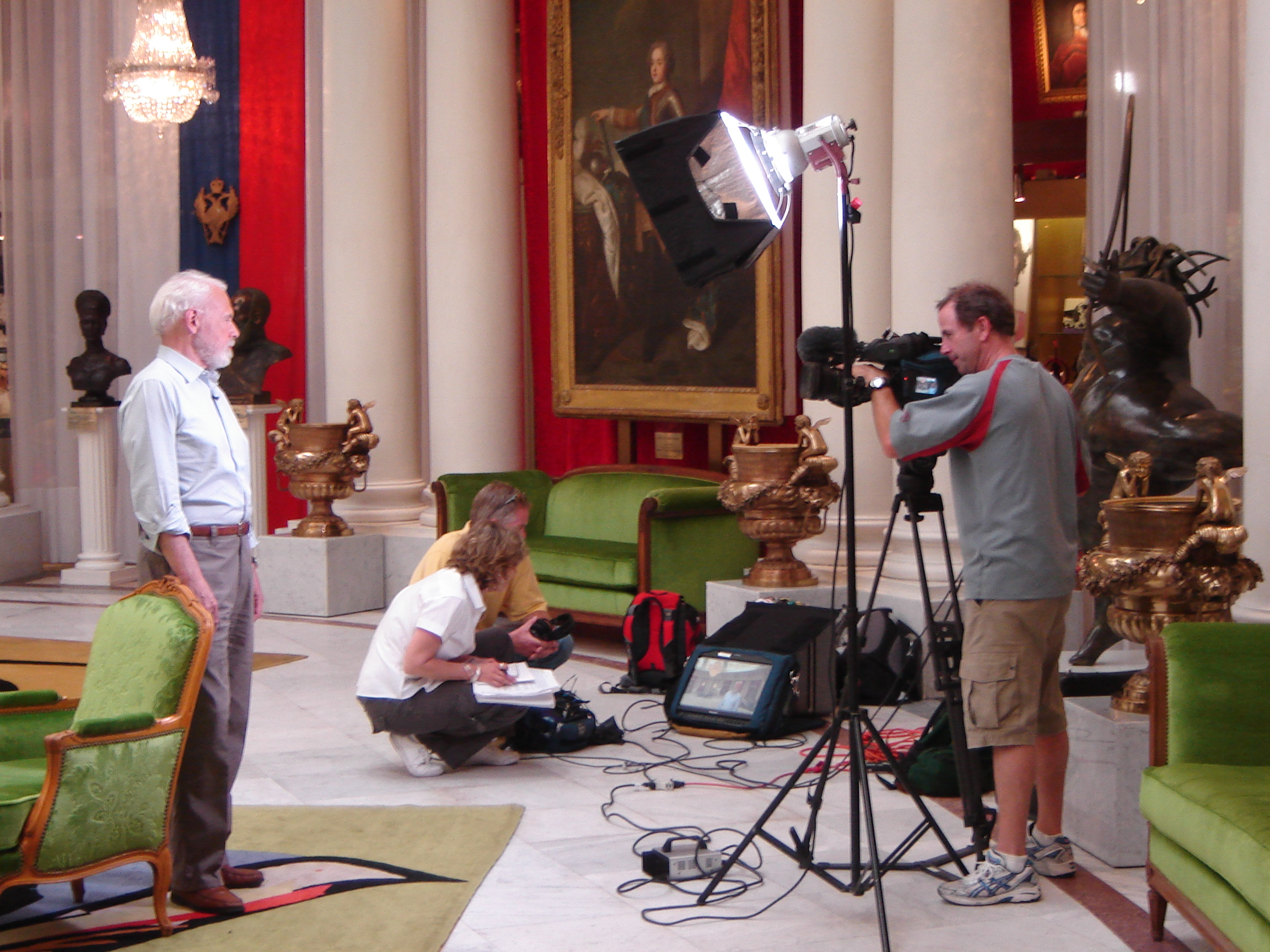
- Also known as: Travels and Traditions with Burt & Nicholas Wolf
- Presented by: Burt Wolf; Nicholas Wolf
- Country of origin: United States
- No. of seasons: 23

Production
- Running time: 22-26
- Production company: Iron Productions LLC

Original release
- Network: PBS
- Release: 2000 – present

Travels & Traditions is a television series hosted by Nicholas Wolf. The series was founded by Burt Wolf in 2000 and is currently in Season 23. The New York Times described it as “the best food, travel, and cultural history shows on television.” The programs are broadcast on Public Television to 95% of the television homes in the United States, then translated into Russian, Polish, Ukrainian, Romanian, Bulgarian, Mandarin and Korean and syndicated to an international audience of over 100 million.

== Episodes ==
=== Travels & Traditions XXIII ===
- 2301 The History & Future of Farming
- 2302 Blueprint to Business
- 2303 History of the Resort Hotel
- 2304 Rejuvenation in the Palm Beaches
- 2305 Freedom of Speech, Part 3
- 2306 A Kinder World, Part 1
- 2307 A Kinder World, Part 2

=== Travels & Traditions XXII ===
- 2201 Farming For The Future
- 2202 Morikami Museum And Japanese Gardens
- 2203 Just Dessert In The Palm Beaches
- 2204 What's Cooking in Guatemala
- 2205 What's Cooking in Miami
- 2206 What's Cooking in The Palm Beaches

=== Travels & Traditions XXI ===
- 2101 Dealing With The Changing World, Part 1
- 2102 Dealing With The Changing World, Part 2
- 2103 Guatemala: What's Mayan Is Yours
- 2104 Shopping In The Palm Beaches
- 2105 Freedom of Speech, Part 1
- 2106 Freedom of Speech, Part 2

=== Travels & Traditions XX ===
- 2001 Neil Young and The Meaning of Success
- 2002 The Hospital of The Future
- 2003 Sleep And Why You Need It
- 2004 Teach Me Something New
- 2005 The History & Future of Communication, Part 1
- 2006 The History & Future of Communication, Part 2

=== Travels & Traditions XIX ===
- 1901 Palm Beach Scrapbook, Part 1
- 1902 Palm Beach Scrapbook, Part 2
- 1903 China Ancient And Modern
- 1904 Mapping Business In China
- 1905 Decisions

=== Travels & Traditions XVIII ===
- 1801 Gone Fishing, Part 1
- 1802 Gone Fishing, Part 2
- 1803 History of Chocolate, Part 1
- 1804 History of Chocolate, Part 2
- 1805 History of Water
- 1806 Great Art Undiscovered
- 1807 How To Sell The Art You Create
- 1808 Short Guide To Cell Phone Safety
- 1809 Travel & The Danger Of RF Radiation

=== Travels & Traditions XVII ===
- 1701 Making of a Restaurant, Part 1
- 1702 Making of a Restaurant, Part 2
- 1703 The Beach Vacation, Part 1
- 1704 The Beach Vacation, Part 2
- 1705 Volunteer Tourism, Part 1
- 1706 Volunteer Tourism, Part 2
- 1707 Do The Right Thing
- 1708 Kansas City Part, 2

=== Travels & Traditions XVI ===
- 1601 Kansas City
- 1602 Guatemala, Part 1
- 1603 Guatemala, Part 2
- 1604 Have a Healthy Trip
- 1605 St. Augustine, Florida
- 1606 Tea for Two
- 1607 Cruising the Baltic
- 1608 The Road To Ruin
- 1609 Visiting a Great Museum
- 1610 On The Road In America, Pt 1
- 1611 On The Road In America, Pt 2
- 1612 On The Road In America, Pt 3

=== Travels & Traditions XV ===
- 1501 Basking With The Basques
- 1502 Coming To America
- 1503 Nature vs Nurture
- 1504 Women At Work
- 1505 The Girl With The Book
- 1506 It’s A Good Thing

=== Travels & Traditions XIV ===
- 1401 Hong Kong, Part 1
- 1402 Hong Kong, Part 2
- 1403 Cruising the Rhine, Part 1
- 1404 Cruising the Rhine, Part 2
- 1405 Sailing the Danube
- 1406 The Palm Beaches

=== Travels & Traditions XIII ===
- 1301 Venice, Italy
- 1302 Florence, Italy
- 1303 What's Cooking in Rome
- 1304 Assisi & Siena, Italy
- 1305 Lucerne, Switzerland
- 1306 Cruising the Adriatic

=== Travels & Traditions XII ===
- 1201 Atlantic Crossing
- 1202 Amsterdam To Cologne
- 1203 Cologne To Zell
- 1204 Cochem To Luxembourg
- 1205 Artcops
- 1206 Nuremberg To Linz
- 1207 Melk To Budapest
- 1208 Lyon To Arles

=== Travels & Traditions XI ===
- 1101 Luzern, Switzerland
- 1102 Touring Ireland
- 1103 Burt Wolf's Family Vacation
- 1104 German Immigration to the US
- 1105 What are they Eating in the Photograph
- 1106 Taiwan A Sense of Place Part Three, Nurture vs. Nature
- 1107 Taiwan A Sense of Place Part Four, Nurture vs. Nature
- 1108 Connecting the Dots in America

=== Travels & Traditions X ===
- 1001 Great Hotels Of the World PART 2
- 1002 New York City
- 1003 Philadelphia, PA
- 1004 Chicago, IL
- 1005 Napa Valley, CA
- 1006 The Basque Region, Spain
- 1007 Miami, FL
- 1008 Belgium
- 1009 San Francisco, CA
- 1010 Springfield, IL

=== Travels & Traditions IX ===
- 901 Cruising Holland & Belgium
- 902 Islands Of Bermuda
- 903 Cruising The Rhine
- 904 Cruising France
- 905 Gateway To Scotland
- 906 Cruising The Netherlands
- 907 The Grand Bahamas
- 908 Cruising Provence
- 909 Cayman Islands
- 910 Great Hotels Of The World

=== Travels & Traditions VIII ===
- 801 Cruising The Danube
- 802 Milan, Italy
- 803 Going Platinum
- 804 Rome, Italy
- 805 What's Cooking In Switzerland
- 806 Holland
- 807 Alaska
- 808 Hong Kong
- 809 Immigrating To America, I
- 810 Immigrating To America, II

=== Travels & Traditions VII ===
- 701 Santa Fe, New Mexico
- 702 Christmas In Vienna, Austria
- 703 Vatican City, Rome
- 704 Cologne, Germany
- 705 Aachen, Germany
- 706 Hamburg, Germany
- 707 St. Gallen, Switzerland
- 708 A Tuscan Harvest, Italy
- 709 Taiwan, A Sense Of Place I
- 710 Taiwan, A Sense Of Place II

=== Travels & Traditions VI ===
- 600 Vatican City & The Papacy
- 601 Atlantic City, New Jersey
- 602 Dublin, Ireland
- 603 The Land Of St. Patrick
- 604 Austrian Monasteries
- 605 On Pilgrimage To Santiago
- 606 Santiago De Compostela, Spain
- 607 Siena, Italy
- 608 Assisi, Italy
- 609 Stamp Collecting, China
- 610 Chimayo, New Mexico

=== Travels & Traditions V ===
- 501 Taiwan
- 502 The Shrine at Guadalupe
- 503 Taipei
- 504 Mexico City
- 505 The History and Science of Shopping
- 506 The Future of Shopping
- 507 The Shrine at Czestochowa, Poland
- 508 Southwestern France
- 509 Kraków, Poland
- 510 The Shrine at Lourdes, France

=== Travels & Traditions IV ===
- 401 Boston, Massachusetts
- 402 Winter in Lake Geneva Region, Switzerland
- 403 Winter in Valais, Switzerland
- 404 Yucatán, Mexico
- 405 Eastern Switzerland
- 406 Jungfrau Region, Switzerland

=== Travels & Traditions III ===
- 301 Oaxaca, Mexico
- 302 Sacramento, California
- 303 Sonoma, California
- 304 California's Gold Country
- 305 Zurich, Switzerland
- 306 Getting Ready for Christmas at Biltmore Estate
- 307 Celebrating Christmas at Biltmore Estate
- 308 U.S. Virgin Islands
- 309 Lake Geneva Region, Switzerland
- 310 Geneva, Switzerland
- 311 Ticino, Switzerland
- 312 Northwestern Switzerland
- 313 The Swiss Mittelland
- 314 The Matterhorn Region
- 315 Graubuenden

=== Travels & Traditions II ===
- 201 The Basque Country of Northern Spain
- 202 Curaçao
- 203 The Twin Cities
- 204 Central Switzerland
- 205 San Francisco
- 206 Beaver Creek
- 207 Napa Valley
- 208 Miami
- 209 Philadelphia
- 210 Springfield
- 211 Ottawa
- 212 Manhattan
- 213 Ellis Island

=== Travels & Traditions I ===
- 101 Munich, Germany
- 102 Greater Miami & The Beaches
- 103 Baja: The Sea of Cortez
- 104 Brussels, Belgium
- 105 Asheville, North Carolina
- 106 Trondheim, Norway
- 107 Tampa Bay, Florida
- 108 Richmond, Virginia
- 109 Naples, Florida
- 110 The New Hong Kong
- 111 Las Vegas
- 112 Bermuda
- 113 Trieste, Italy
