= Earth Trek =

- Genre: Documentary
- Written by: Joni Ravenna
- Directed by: Rich Oliphant
- Presented by: Joni Ravenna
- Country of origin: United States
- Original language: English

Production
- Running time: 30 minutes
- Production company: Raven Productions

Original release
- Network: PBS
- Release: 1 November 2001 – 1 December 2002

Earth Trek was a travel and adventure program produced by Palm Springs production company Raven Productions. The show was hosted and written by award-winning author, playwright, screenwriter and journalist, Joni Ravenna, who had previously hosted Great Sports Vacations, and Ticket To Adventure and now hosts Hello Paradise, and John Stevens. It also featured celebrity guests, including Sean Astin, Tate Donovan, Nancy Kwan, Michael Weiss. It was distributed on PBS stations from coast to coast beginning September 2001.
