= Joanne Weir =

American chef

Joanne Weir (born August 2, 1952) is an American chef, author, and television host. She is the host of Joanne Weir's Cooking Class on PBS.

== Accolades ==
=== James Beard Awards ===
Winner

- (2005) General (Weir Cooking in the City)

Nominated

- (2002) Americana (Joanne Weir's More Cooking in the Wine Country)
- (1999) Vegetables and Vegetarian (You Say Tomato)
- (1995) International (From Tapas to Meze)

== Books ==
- Weir Cooking in the City: More than 125 Recipes and Inspiring Ideas for Relaxed Entertaining
- Kitchen Gypsy (2015)
- Weir Cooking: Recipes From the Wine Country (Time-Life Books)
- Joanne Weir's More Cooking in the Wine Country (Simon & Schuster)
- You Say Tomato (Broadway Books)
