= Victor Rallo =

American restaurateur

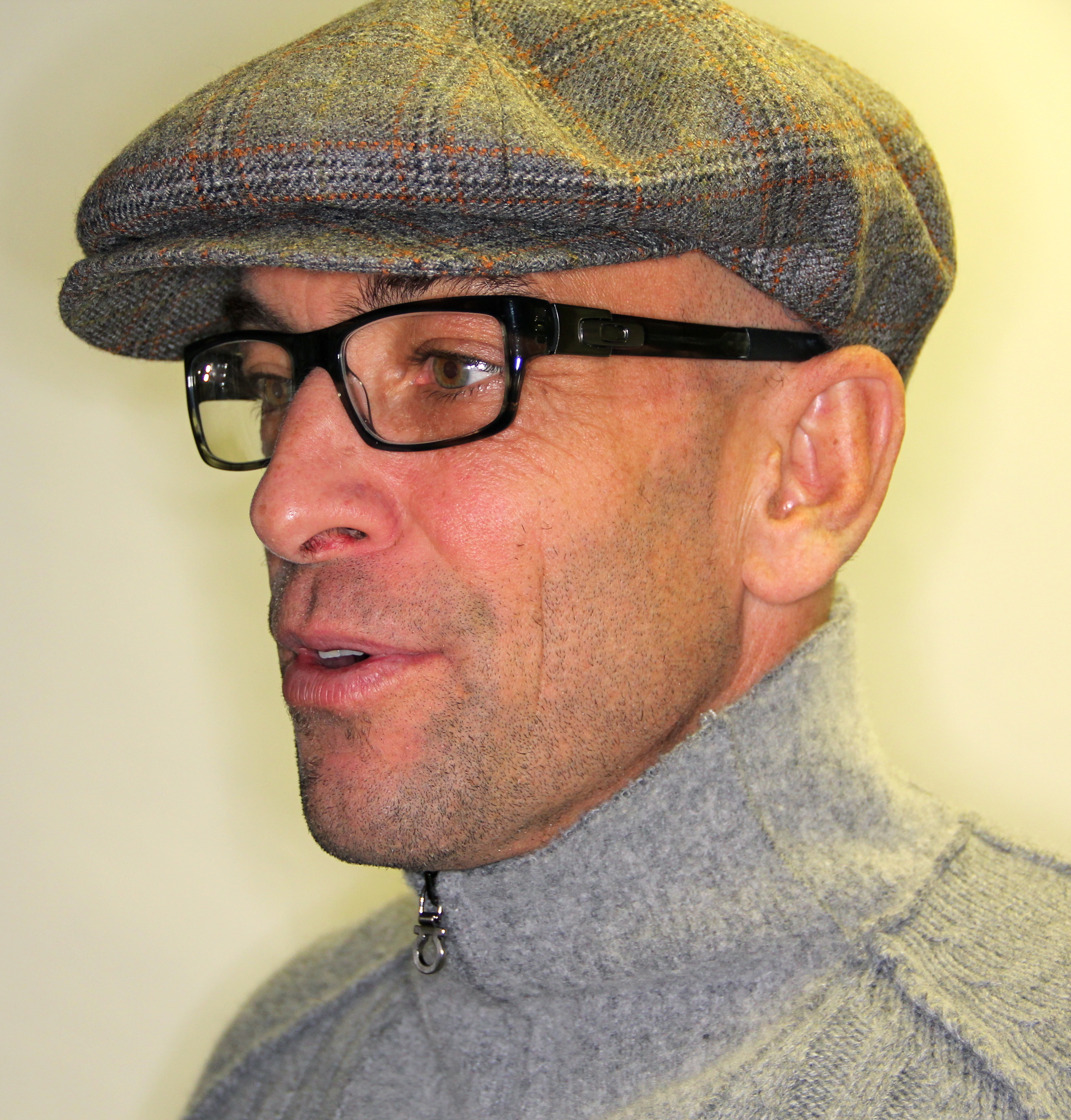
- Rallo in January 2012
- Education: Villanova University; Seton Hall University School of Law (JD)
- Occupations: Restauranteur; wine critic
- Spouse: Kari
- Children: 3

Victor Rallo is an American restaurateur and wine critic in New Jersey. On July 6, 2013, his public television show Eat! Drink! Italy! with Vic Rallo premiered. He owns and runs Birravino in Red Bank, New Jersey, and Undici Taverna Rustica in Rumson, New Jersey. He has published two wine books, Napoleon Wasn't Exiled and 21 Wines. He created an online "wine community" called Rallo Wines with wine expert Anthony Verdoni. He recently opened a chain of Barbecue restaurants called "Surf".

Rallo's father ran a Newark pizzeria and other eateries in New Jersey, including a restaurant in West Orange. Victor is a graduate of Villanova University and has a J.D. from Seton Hall Law School in New Jersey. He lives in Fair Haven with his wife, Kari, and their three children, Jake, Jack and Eli. Eli, his oldest daughter, is an author and social media influencer with over one million online followers.
