= List of chefs =

Only those subjects who are notable enough for their own articles should be included here. That may include chefs who have articles in other languages on Wikipedia which have not as yet been translated into English.

This article is a list of notable chefs and food experts throughout history.

== Antiquity ==
- Mithaecus
- Apicius, chef to Emperor Trajan

== 12th century ==
- Liu Niangzi, Chinese Imperial chef

== 14th century ==
- Sidoine Benoît
- Guillaume Tirel, also known as Taillevent, first professional French master chef

== 15th century ==
- Maestro Martino
- Bartolomeo Platina

== 16th century ==
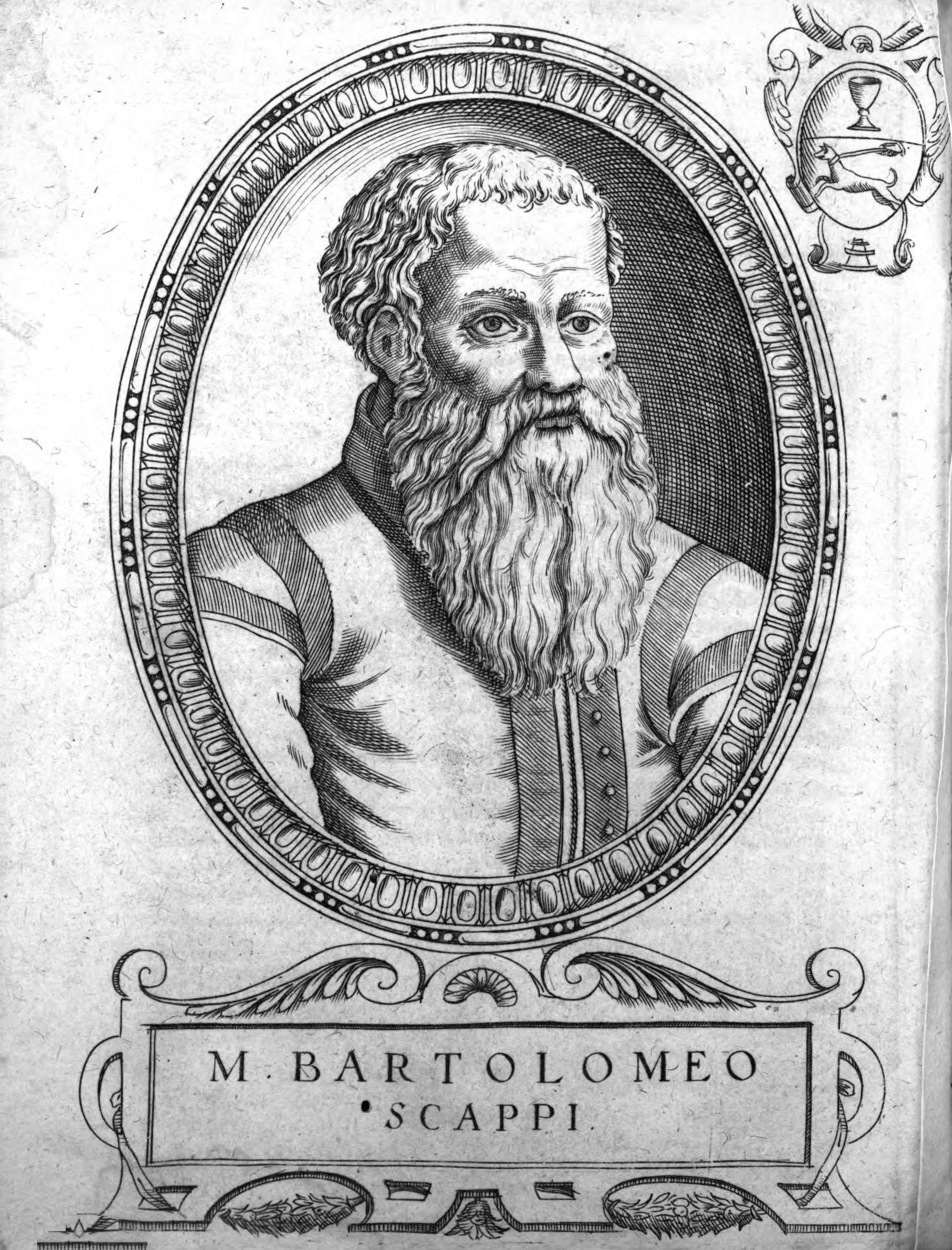
Bartolomeo Scappi

- Lancelot de Casteau, author of L'Ouverture de cuisine (1604)
- Guillaume Fouquet de la Varenne
- Bartolomeo Scappi, author of Opera dell'Arte del Cucinare (1570)

== 17th century ==
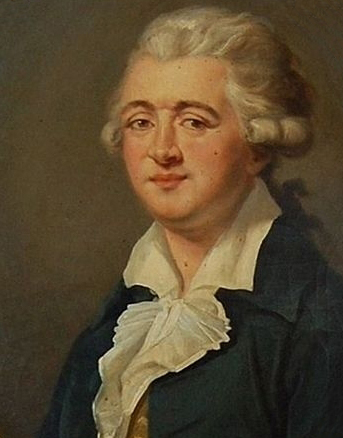
Procopio Cutò

- Procopio Cutò, Sicilian chef in Paris, founder of Cafe Procopio
- Stanisław Czerniecki, author of Compendium ferculorum, albo Zebranie potraw, the first cookbook written originally in Polish
- Patrick Lamb, Master Cook to the British Crown from the reign of Charles II to Queen Anne
- François Pierre de la Varenne, author of Le Cuisinier françois (1651)
- François Vatel, maître d'hôtel to Nicolas Fouquet and to Grand Condé

== 18th century ==
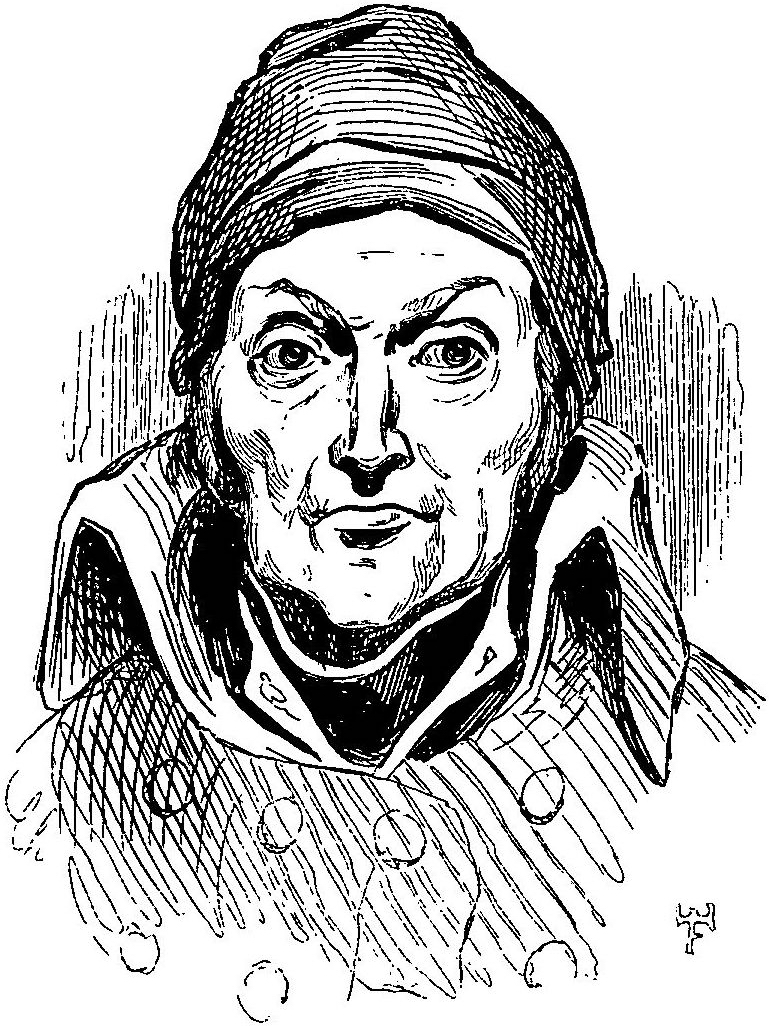
Nicolas Appert

- Nicolas Appert, pioneer of canning
- Antoine Beauvilliers, pioneering restaurateur
- Hercules, chef of George Washington, and first US Presidential chef
- François Massialot, author of Le cuisinier royal et bourgeois (1712) and Le nouveau cuisinier royal et bourgeois (1717)
- Vincent la Chapelle, author of Cuisinier moderne (1733)
- Menon, author of Nouveau Traité de la Cuisine (1739) and La Cuisinière bourgeoise (1746)
- Paul Tremo, court chef to King Stanislaus Augustus of Poland
- James Hemings, personal, enslaved, chef to Thomas Jefferson. First American chef to be fully trained in France, commonly attributed as the origin of Macaroni and cheese.

== 19th century ==
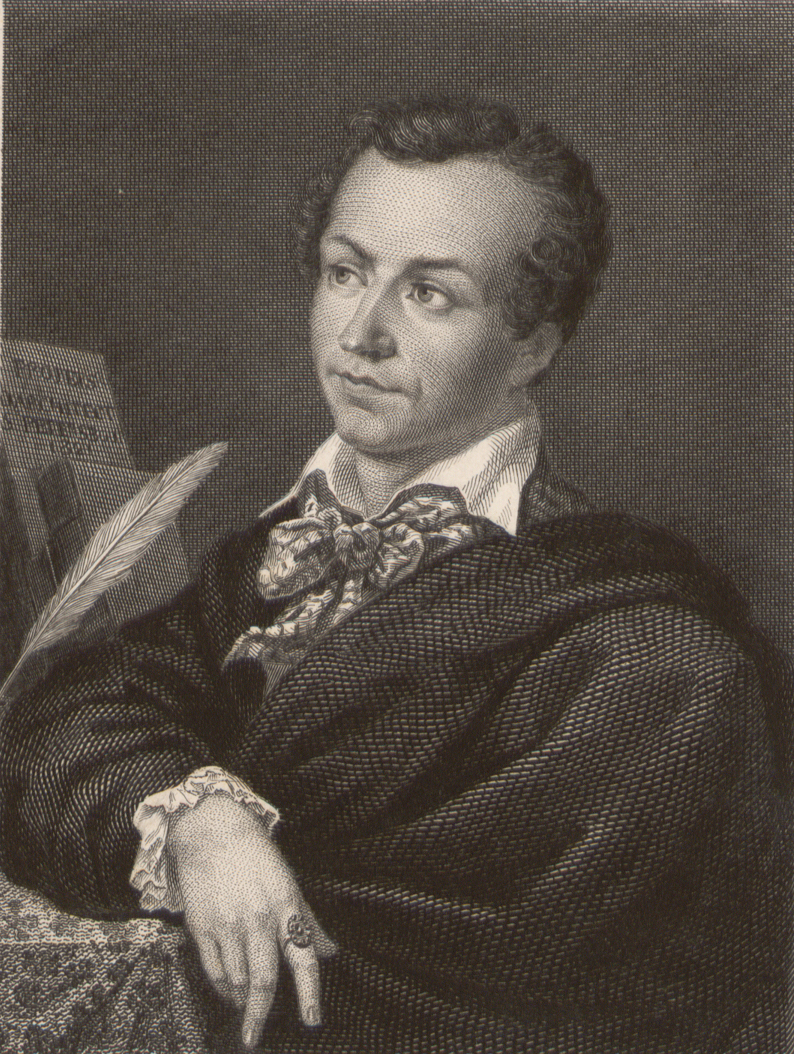
Marie-Antoine Carême

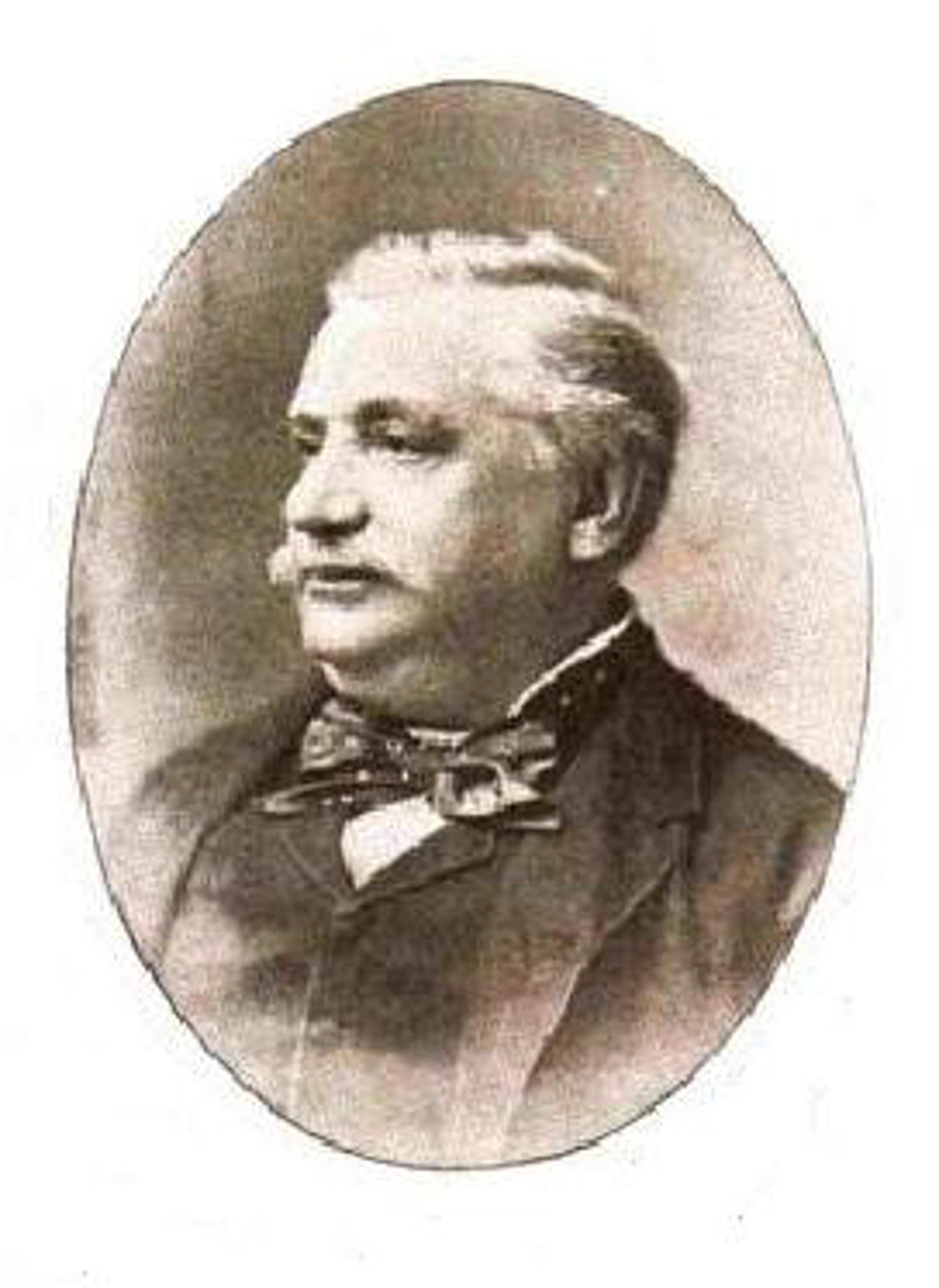
Charles Ranhofer

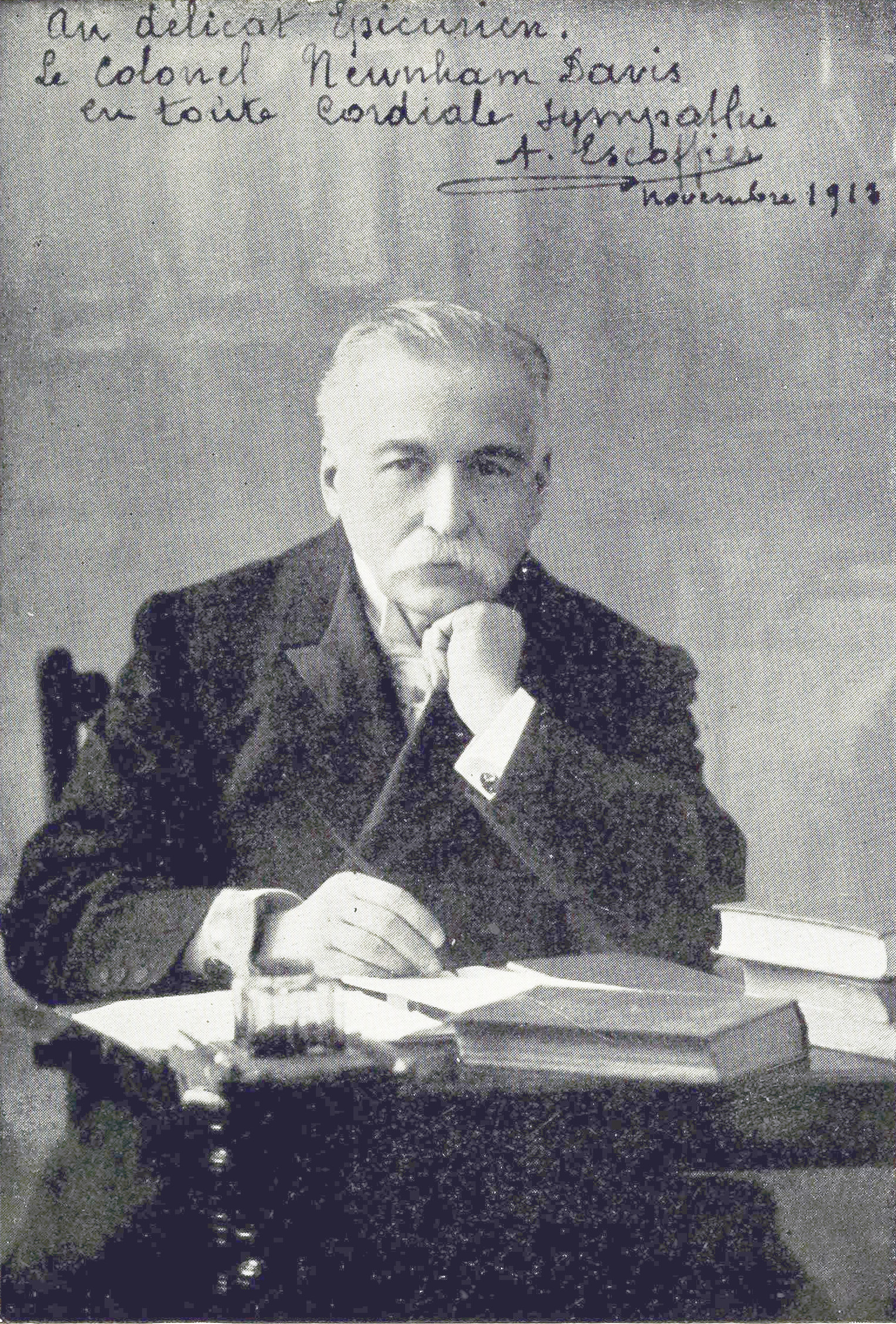
Auguste Escoffier

- Marcel Boulestin
- Marie-Antoine Carême, founder of Haute cuisine
- Alexandre Étienne Choron
- Jean-Louis-François Collinet
- George Crum
- Marthe Distel, co-founder of Le Cordon Bleu
- Urbain Dubois, author of numerous works on food and creator of Veal Orloff
- Adolphe Dugléré, head chef of Café Anglais
- Auguste Escoffier
- Fannie Farmer, author of bestselling cookbook (1896)
- Joseph Favre, author of Grand Dictionnaire universel de la cuisine and founder of the Académie culinaire de France
- Charles Elmé Francatelli
- Jules Gouffé
- Lucien Olivier, Belgian-born Russian chef
- Henri-Paul Pellaprat, co-founder of Le Cordon Bleu
- Anne Boutiaut Poulard
- Alfred Prunier
- Charles Ranhofer
- Alexis Soyer
- Louis Eustache Ude, author of The French Cook (1813)

== 20th century ==
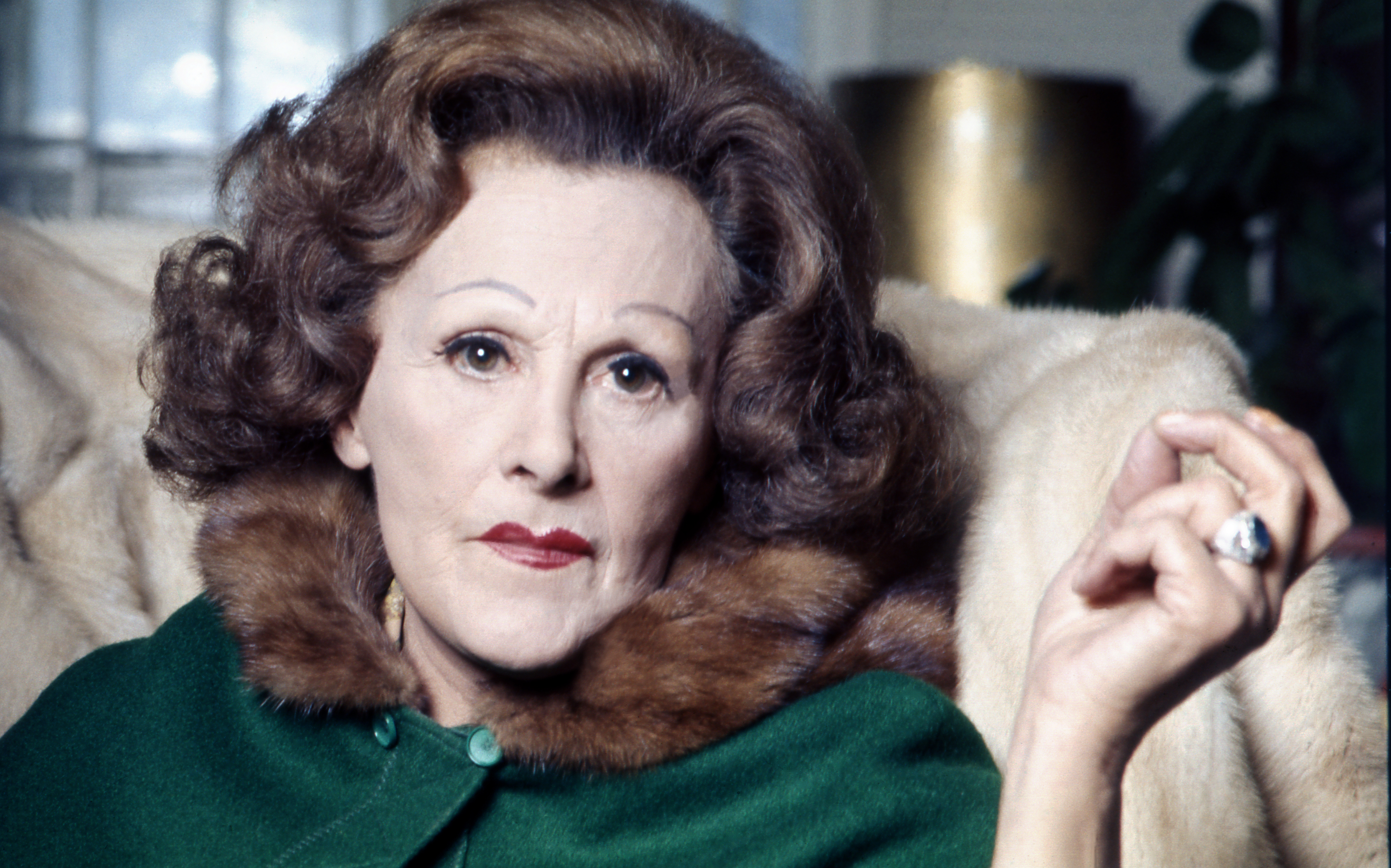
Fanny Cradock

- Ferran Adrià
- Reed Alexander
- Tokuzo Akiyama
- Darin Allen
- Ida Bailey Allen
- Myrtle Allen
- Rachel Allen
- Joey Altman
- Elena Arzak
- Juan Mari Arzak, founder of New Basque Cuisine
- Kenny Atkinson
- Frances Atkins
- Jean Bardet
- Paul Bartolotta
- Joe Bastianich
- Lidia Bastianich
- Mario Batali
- Rick Bayless
- James Beard
- Simone Beck
- Paul Bentley
- Martín Berasategui
- Mary Berry
- John Besh
- Marguerite Bise
- Jack Bishop
- Mark Bittman
- Raymond Blanc
- Heston Blumenthal, pioneer of Molecular gastronomy
- Martin Blunos
- Paul Bocuse
- Ettore Boiardi
- Massimo Bottura
- David Bouley
- Daniel Boulud
- Anthony Bourdain
- Michel Bras
- Madame Brassart
- Eugénie Brazier
- Susan Brookes
- Alton Brown
- Jane Butel
- Caesar Cardini, inventor of Caesar salad (1924)
- Antonio Carluccio
- Andrew Carmellini
- Doña Petrona Carrizo
- Alain Chapel
- Éric Chavot
- Joyce Chen
- Cecilia Chiang
- Chen Kenichi, son of Chen Kenmin
- Chen Kenmin
- Michael Chiarello
- Julia Child
- Bobby Chinn
- Craig Claiborne
- Patrick Clark
- Gennaro Contaldo
- Helen Corbitt
- Richard Corrigan
- Fanny Cradock
- Lynn Crawford
- Curnonsky (Maurice Edmond Sailland)
- Hélène Darroze
- Elizabeth David
- Jean-Robert de Cavel
- Traci Des Jardins
- Avis DeVoto
- Rocco DiSpirito
- Alain Ducasse
- Wylie Dufresne
- Todd English
- Mary Ann Esposito
- Philippe Etchebest
- Hugh Fearnley-Whittingstall
- Susan Feniger
- Annie Féolde
- Barbara Figueroa
- Bobby Flay
- Tyler Florence
- Keith Floyd
- Zonya Foco
- John Folse
- Pierre Franey
- Lois Ellen Frank
- Laura Frankel
- Pierre Gagnaire
- Ina Garten
- Henri Gault
- Alexis Gauthier
- André Gayot
- Adriana Giramonti
- Elka Gilmore
- Frédy Girardet
- Joyce Goldstein
- Rose Gray
- Gael Greene
- Loyd Grossman
- Michel Guérard
- Skye Gyngell
- Martin Hadden
- Fatéma Hal
- Dorothy Cann Hamilton
- John R. Hanny
- Ainsley Harriott
- Angela Hartnett
- Marcella Hazan
- Roland Henin
- Ingrid Hoffmann
- Ken Hom
- Timothy Hollingsworth
- Peter Hudson and David Halls
- Chuck Hughes
- Annemarie Huste
- Yutaka Ishinabe
- Elijah Joy
- Toshiro Kandagawa
- Sanjeev Kapoor
- Mollie Katzen
- Hubert Keller
- Thomas Keller
- Chen Kenichi
- Diana Kennedy
- Matthew Kenney
- Graham Kerr
- Christopher Kimball
- Masahiko Kobe
- Pierre Koffmann
- Erez Komarovsky
- Ed LaDou
- Emeril Lagasse
- Annabel Langbein
- Nigella Lawson
- Rustie Lee
- Susur Lee
- Ludovic Lefebvre
- Gaston Lenôtre
- Edna Lewis
- Paul Liebrandt
- Cyril Lignac
- Patrick Lin
- Antonia Lofaso
- Bernard Loiseau
- Emily Luchetti
- Dione Lucas
- Dale MacKay
- Karen MacNeil
- Gualtiero Marchesi
- James Martin
- Rokusaburo Michiba
- Christian Millau
- Prosper Montagné, author of Larousse Gastronomique (1938)
- Rick Moonen
- Masaharu Morimoto
- Sara Moulton
- Tamara Murphy
- Koumei Nakamura
- Joan Nathan
- Rafael Nazario
- Jean-Christophe Novelli
- Jamie Oliver
- Raymond Oliver
- Ken Oringer
- Jean-Louis Palladin
- Charlie Palmer
- Merrilees Parker
- Russ Parsons
- Alain Passard
- Mark Peel
- Jacques Pépin
- Anne-Sophie Pic
- Jacques Pic
- John Pisto
- Fernand Point
- Debra Ponzek
- Anne Boutiaut Poulard
- Paul Prudhomme
- Wolfgang Puck
- Steven Raichlen
- Carmen Ramírez Degollado
- Gordon Ramsay
- Paul Rankin
- Ruth Reichl
- Gary Rhodes
- Éric Ripert
- Claire Robinson
- Joël Robuchon
- Philippe Rochat
- Judy Rogers
- Irma S. Rombauer
- Michel Roux
- Michel Roux Jr.
- Michael Ruhlman
- Carme Ruscalleda
- Hiroyuki Sakai
- Marcus Samuelsson
- Nadia Santini
- Guy Savoy
- Joseph Scarpone
- Alain Senderens
- John Shields
- Nancy Silverton
- Nigel Slater
- Art Smith
- Delia Smith
- Charmaine Solomon
- Henri Soulé
- Rick Stein
- Martha Stewart
- Curtis Stone
- Holger Stromberg
- Michael Symon
- Louis Szathmary
- Jean-Claude Szurdak
- Sami Tallberg
- Tommy Tang
- John Martin Taylor
- Matt Tebbutt
- Stephen Terry
- Amy Thielen
- Antony Worrall Thompson
- John Thorne
- Sanjay Thumma
- John Torode
- Raquel Torres Cerdán
- Jacques Torres
- Jeremiah Tower
- Jerry Traunfeld
- Troisgros family
  - Claude Troisgros
  - Pierre Troisgros
- Barbara Tropp
- Charlie Trotter
- Ming Tsai
- Brian Turner
- Roger Vergé
- Marc Veyrat
- Andreas Viestad
- Jean-Georges Vongerichten
- Lisl Wagner-Bacher
- Tetsuya Wakuda
- Gregg Wallace
- Brendan Walsh
- Chef Wan
- Marcel Vigneron
- Alice Waters
- Jonathan Waxman
- Annabelle White
- Marco Pierre White
- Arlene Williams
- Bryn Williams
- Justin Wilson
- Pierre Wynants
- Martin Yan
- Stephen Yan
- Chan Yan-tak
- Geoffrey Zakarian
- Andrew Zimmern

== 21st century ==
- Connie Achurra
- Samia Ahad
- Noor Al Mazroei
- Reed Alexander
- Rachel Allen
- Ted Allen
- Anjum Anand
- Shauna Anderson
- Sunny Anderson
- José Andrés
- Dave Arnold
- JohnPaul Arabome
- Alex Atala
- Eric Aubriot
- Ed Baines
- Andy Baraghani
- Dan Barber
- Nieves Barragán Mohacho
- Danni Barry
- Tala Bashmi
- Francesco Bellissimo
- Emma Bengtsson
- Ron Ben-Israel
- Bobo Bergström
- Gabriele Bertaccini
- Jamie Bissonnette
- Freddie Bitsoie
- Richard Blais
- April Bloomfield
- Justin Bogle
- Michael Bolster
- Simon Bonwick
- Cristina Bowerman
- Danny Bowien
- Sean Brock
- Frank Bruni
- Anne Burrell
- Laura Calder
- Gabriela Cámara
- Cellphone
- David Chang
- Erchen Chang
- Maneet Chauhan
- Michael Chiarello
- Gianfranco Chiarini
- Yuki Chizui
- May Chow
- Warren Chow
- Saipin Chutima
- Angelo Ciccone
- Derry Clarke
- Mike Colameco
- Tom Colicchio
- Scott Conant
- Cat Cora
- Chris Cosentino
- Denis Cotter
- Madison Cowan
- Carlo Cracco
- Salvatore Cuomo
- Melissa d'Arabian
- Jean-Robert de Cavel
- Paula Deen
- Giada De Laurentiis
- Tiffany Derry
- Traci Des Jardins
- Matt Dowling
- Martie Duncan
- Kevin Dundon
- Ali Salem Edbowa
- Lillian Elidah
- Graham Elliot
- Pete Evans
- Mark Flanagan
- Guy Fieri
- Amy Finley
- Toni Fiore
- Marc Forgione
- Marc Fosh
- Lois Ellen Frank
- Amanda Freitag
- Catherine Fulvio
- Conrad Gallagher
- Jose Garces
- Ali Ghzawi
- Nadia Giosia
- Duff Goldman
- Anette Grecchi Gray
- Suzette Gresham
- Sarah Grueneberg
- Alexandra Guarnaschelli
- Patrick Guilbaud
- Christine Hà
- Elizabeth Haigh
- Carla Hall
- Anna Hansen
- Catherine Healy
- Tanya Holland
- Paul Hollywood
- Ching He Huang
- Robert Irvine
- Rita Jaima Paru
- Colombe Jacobsen
- Margot Janse
- Celia Jiménez
- Pati Jinich
- Mikael Jonsson
- Tony Karim
- Matthew Kenney
- Tom Kerridge
- Karen Keygnaert
- Dawar Khan
- Tara Khattar
- Selin Kiazim
- Anita Klemensen
- Florence Knight
- Erez Komarovsky
- Edward Young-min Kwon
- Kylie Kwong
- Thierry Laborde
- Annabel Langbein
- Jessica Largey
- Vicky Lau
- Katie Lee
- Susur Lee
- Ludo Lefebvre
- Yvan Lemoine
- Alvin Leung
- Mei Lin
- Travis London
- Nathan Lyon
- Shane Lyons
- Beau MacMillan
- Tracy Malechek-Ezekiel
- Francis Mallmann
- Neven Maguire
- Karen Martini
- Nikki Martin
- Daisy Martinez
- Nobu Matsuhisa
- Jeff Mauro
- Aaron McCargo, Jr.
- Dylan McGrath
- Lenny McNab
- Lorna McNee
- Claus Meyer, co-founder of New Danish cuisine
- Tommy Miah
- Mary Sue Milliken
- Sarah Minnick
- Melissa Miranda
- Rick Moonen
- Saiphin Moore
- Zeina Mourtada
- Dan Mullane
- Marc Murphy
- Shota Nakajima
- Magnus Nilsson
- Michel Nischan
- Kelsey Nixon
- Franco Noriega
- Misti Norris
- Ben O'Donoghue
- Yotam Ottolenghi
- Enzo Oliveri
- Martha Ortiz
- James Oseland
- Yianni Papoutsis
- Lorraine Pascale
- Mark Peel
- Damaris Phillips
- Suresh Pillai
- Stacey Poon-Kinney
- Wolfgang Puck
- Titti Qvarnström
- Michele Ragussis
- Wendy Rahamut
- Gordon Ramsay
- Rachael Ray
- Jay Rayner
- René Redzepi, co-founder of New Danish cuisine
- Britt Rescigno
- Simon Rimmer
- Missy Robbins
- Daniel Rose
- Andre Rush
- Declan Ryan
- Jeffrey Saad
- Marcus Samuelsson
- Aarón Sanchez
- Roshara Sanders
- Chris Santos
- Miyoko Schinner
- Kamilla Seidler
- Aarti Sequeira
- Sean Sherman
- John Shields
- Nancy Silverton
- Gail Simmons
- Vivek Singh
- Donal Skehan
- Clare Smyth
- Mutsuko Soma
- Kevin Sousa
- Nick Stellino
- Ethan Stowell
- Ripudaman Handa
- Jun Tanaka
- Bryant Terry
- Haile Thomas
- Luke Thomas
- Kevin Thornton
- Sue Torres
- Christina Tosi
- Paolo Tullio
- Bryan Voltaggio
- Doma Wang
- Wang Gang
- Justin Warner
- Valentine Warner
- Emily Watkins
- Jody Williams
- Kate Williams
- Brooke E. Williamson
- Lee Anne Wong
- Sophie Wright
- Seiji Yamamoto
- Aldo Zilli
- Chef Abbys

== See also ==
- Le Club des Chefs des Chefs
- List of female chefs with Michelin stars
- List of Indian chefs
- List of pastry chefs
- List of food writers
  - List of cookbook writers
