= Wang Gang =

Wang Gang may refer to:

- Wang Gang (actor) (born 1948), Chinese actor and TV host
- Wang Gang (chef) (born 1989), Chinese chef and Internet personality
- Wang Gang (footballer) (born 1989), Chinese association footballer
- Wang Gang (politician) (born 1942), Chinese politician
- Wang Gang (writer) (born 1960), Chinese writer
- Wang Gang (politician, born 1971), Chinese politician, deputy minister in the Ministry of Transport
- Wang Gang (general) (Chinese: 王刚), Chinese general, commander of the People's Liberation Army Air Force

== See also ==
- Wan Gang
