= Carine Goren =

Writer

- קרין גורן
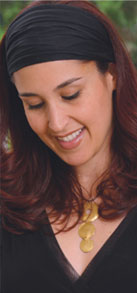
- Goren in 2006
- Born: May 24, 1974 (age 52)
- Education: B.A. communication, University of Haifa
- Occupations: Pastry chef, cookbook author, television baking show host
- Spouse: Ronen Goren
- Writing career
- Language: Hebrew
- Years active: 2000—present
- Genre: Cooking
- Notable work: Sweet Secrets (2006)
- Website: carine.co.il/English

Carine Goren (Hebrew: קרין גורן; born 1974) is an Israeli pastry chef, bestselling cookbook author, and television personality. She began her culinary career at age 26 as a recipe writer and editor at the Israeli food magazine Al Hashulchan (Around the Table), and in 2006 published her first dessert cookbook, Sweet Secrets. As of 2016 she has published five cookbooks, including one for children, and is the host of her own television baking show, also called Sweet Secrets. In 2016, she became a judge on the new Israeli reality television show Bake-Off Israel. She was the most googled person in Israel in 2015.

== Early life ==
Growing up in Haifa, she was one of two daughters of a driving instructor and a stay-at-home mother. Karin graduated from the Hebrew Reali School in 1992. She earned a B.A. in communication at the University of Haifa, and later on earned B.Sc. in Software Engineering at the ORT Braude College of Engineering. She married her high school sweetheart, Ronen Goren, at age 24. The couple moved to Karmiel, where they both studied computers, but Carine felt dissatisfied and sought out courses in different arts and crafts.

At age 26, she was fired from her job as a webmaster and used her severance pay to take a 12-week pastry-making course. Deciding that pastry-making was her vocation, she began buying cookbooks and experimenting with dessert-making while working as a computer programmer for the Israeli food magazine Al Hashulchan (Around the Table). She brought her homemade desserts to share with her co-workers and was soon promoted to writer and editor, producing three dessert cookbooks for the publication. In 2004 she began writing a weekly food supplement for Maariv. She spent a year and a half as a recipe developer for cakes, cookies, and fancy baked goods at the Lehem Erez restaurant and coffee shop in Herzliya under the tutelage of Erez Komarovsky.

== Cookbooks ==
Goren self-published her first dessert cookbook, Sweet Secrets, in 2006. Like her later books, the cookbook includes a DVD showing her demonstrating several recipes. The success of the Hebrew-language cookbook led to a demand from overseas readers, and an English-language version of Sweet Secrets was made available by mail order in 2010. She later published Sweet Secrets 2 (2011) and several other titles, including a children's baking book.

Targeted to the home baker, Goren's recipes call for "simple" ingredients found in any neighborhood supermarket. A Haaretz reviewer opined that the success of her books, which spend months on bestseller lists, is due to her appeal to the "typical Israeli baker". Recipes call for readily-available ingredients such as "tahina, toffee candies, halva and marshmallows", and feature baking equipment found in every housewares store. Goren's recipes are often recirculated in newspaper cooking columns and online blogs. She was the most googled person in Israel in 2015.

== Television personality ==
In 2007 Goren launched her own television baking show, Sweet Secrets, on Channel 2. She previously hosted 15 episodes of Guide to Baking with Carine Goren on Channel 10.

In April 2016 she appeared as a judge in the first season of the reality television series Bake-Off Israel, a local version of The Great British Bake Off.

== Personal life ==
She met her husband, Ronen Goren, in high school; they married in 1998. Like her, Ronen initially pursued a career in computers but became bored with it and became a professional chef instead. He left his career to manage her brand, including her cookbooks, television show, website, and fan forum. They reside in Herzliya.

== Bibliography ==
- חצי חצי [Half and Half] (in Hebrew). 2016.
- Traditional Jewish Baking: Retro recipes your grandma could make…if she had a mixer. Macmillan. 2016. ISBN 978-1624142758.
- אם לסבתא היה מיקסר [If Grandma Had a Mixer] (in Hebrew). Carine Goren. 2013.
- סודות מתוקים 2 [Sweet Secrets 2] (in Hebrew). Kokemdia. 2011.
- אפייה זה משחק ילדים [Baking is Child's Play] (in Hebrew). Carine Goren. 2008.
- סודות מתוקים [Sweet Secrets] (in Hebrew). Carine Goren. 2006.
