= Bonwick =

Bonwick is a surname. Notable people with the surname include:

- Alfred Bonwick (1883–1949), British politician
- James Bonwick (1817–1906), English-born Australian writer
- Jeff Bonwick, American computer scientist
- Paul Bonwick (born 1964), Canadian politician
- Simon Bonwick (born 1969), British chef

== See also ==
- Bonwick Island, an island of British Columbia, Canada
