= Mis Tacones =

Mexican restaurant in Portland, Oregon, U.S.

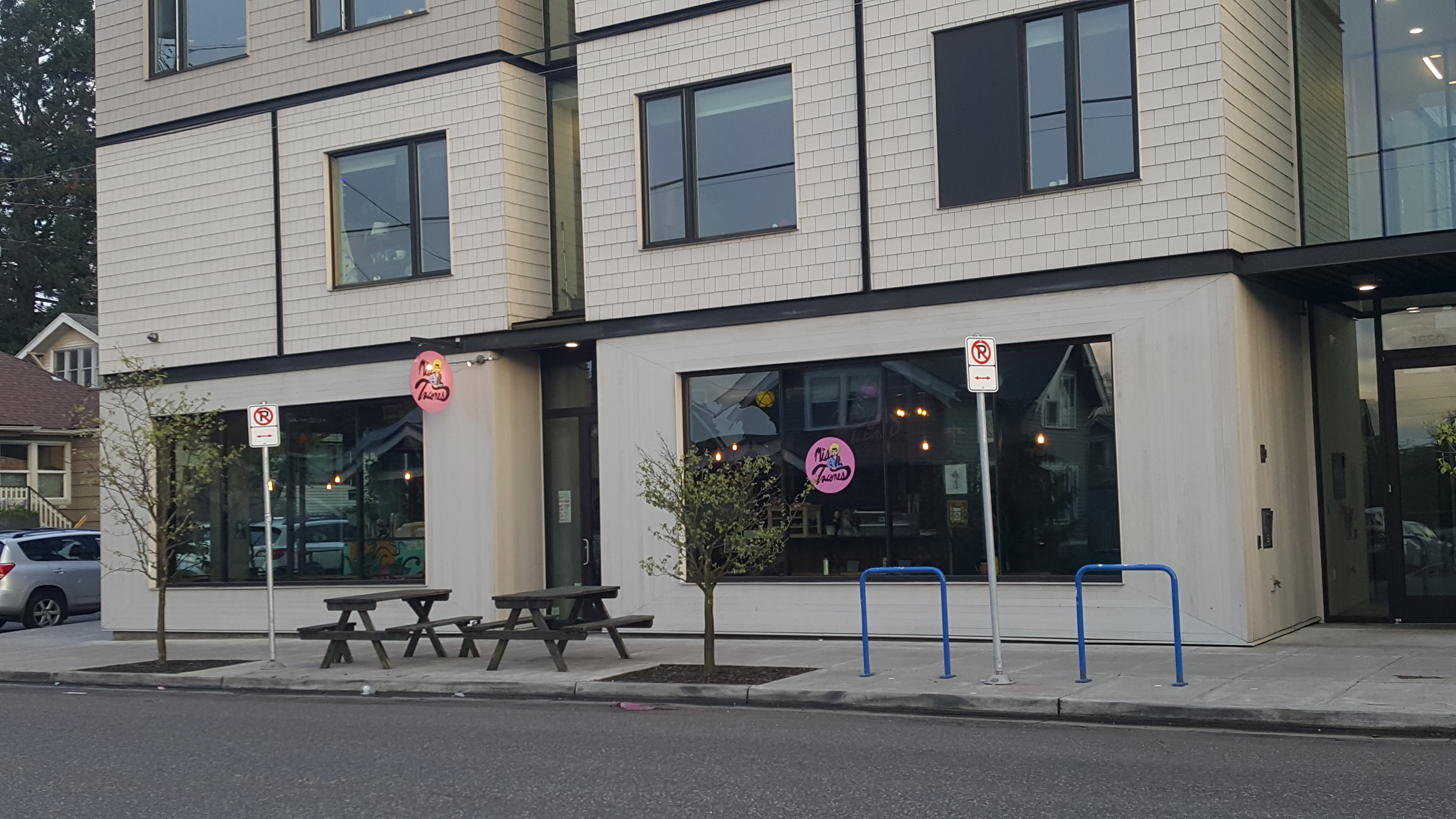
- The restaurant's exterior, 2022
- Interactive map of Mis Tacones

Restaurant information
- Established: 2016
- Owners: Carlos Reynoso; Polo Abram Bañuelos
- Food type: Mexican; vegan
- Location: 1670 Northeast Killingsworth Street, Portland, Multnomah, Oregon, 97211, United States
- Coordinates: 45.5626°N 122.6479°W

Mis Tacones is a Chicano and queer-owned vegan taquería in Portland, Oregon, United States.

== Description ==
Michael Russell of The Oregonian has described Mis Tacones as a "Chicano and queer-owned vegan taco pop-up". He wrote in 2022, "The colorful new restaurant serves nourishing tacos, tortas, French fry nachos, burritos and chimichangas made with house-made seitan instead of meat, plus delightfully rainbow-hued conchas from vegan bakery La Casa De Mamá. Mis Tacones remains focused on Portland's LGBTQ community, including by offering free meals to trans people of color." The owners were inspired to provide free food to trans people of color after visiting Gay4U, a vegan restaurant run by Cellphone in Oakland, California.

According to Waz Wu of Eater Portland, Mis Tacones' tortillas are "hand-pressed to order, then filled with extra juicy al pastor, asada, and cilantro-lime-marinated house-made seitan, dressed with chipotle crema and salsas". The menu also includes empanadas and meatless asada.

== History ==
Mis Tacones launched as a vegan pop-up restaurant in 2016. Carlos Reynoso and Polo Abram Bañuelos began making tacos in Portland after relocating from Los Angeles. Inspired by street food in Baja California and Los Angeles, the duo made seitan tacos and other foods at private dinners, Saturday markets, and queer dance events. The operation was halted by the COVID-19 pandemic. In 2021, the business operated at the gay bar Local Lounge, which was hosting outdoor drag shows.

In January 2022, the owners announced plans to open a brick and mortar restaurant on Killingsworth Street in northeast Portland's Vernon neighborhood in February. The duo had launched a GoFundMe campaign to raise the initial $50,000 needed to run a larger operation.

== Reception ==
Interior, 2022

Waz Wu included Mis Tacones in Eater Portland's 2021 overview of "tasty" vegan Tacos in the city and 2023 list of fifteen "essential" vegan and vegetarian eateries in Portland. Brenna Houck included the business in the website's 2025 overview of the city's eighteen best vegan and vegetarian restaurants. Mis Tacones was also in the website's 2025 list of Portand's best restaurants for mid-week lunches. Paolo Bicchieri included the business in Eater Portland's 2025 overview of the city's best restaurants for lunch.

Mis Tacones was a runner-up in the Best Mexican Restaurant and ranked second in the Best Vegetarian/Vegan Restaurant category of Willamette Week's annual 'Best of Portland' readers' poll in 2024. The business was a finalist and ranked second in the Best Mexican Restaurant and Best Vegetarian/Vegan Restaurant categories, repspectively, in 2025. It was a finalist in both categories in 2026. The New York Times included Mis Tacones in a 2026 list of the nation's 41 best Mexican restaurants.

== See also ==
- Hispanics and Latinos in Portland, Oregon
- LGBTQ-owned business
- List of Mexican restaurants
- List of vegetarian and vegan restaurants
