= Dawar Khan =

Pakistani writer, researcher, and poet (1940–2018)

Professor Dawar Khan
- داور خان داوود
- Professor Dawar Khan Daud
- Born: February 16, 1940; Landi Arbab, Peshawar, Pakistan
- Died: June 3, 2018 (aged 78); Peshawar, Pakistan
- Resting place: Landi Arbab
- Education: English literature Master's; Pashto literature Master's; Urdu literature Master's
- Alma mater: University of Peshawar
- Occupations: Professor, Writer, Researcher, Poet, Folklorist
- Writing career
- Language: Pashto, Urdu and English languages
- Years active: 1959-2018
- Period: 1959-2018
- Subjects: Art, Literature
- Notable awards: Pride of Performance (2004)

Dawar Khan Daud (16 February 1940 – 3 June 2018) was an English professor, Pashtu folklorist, writer, poet, researcher, lecturer, member of Pashto Adabi Board (PAB) and president of Rahman Baba Adabi Jirga (RAJ), a literary organisation of Khyber Pakhtunkhwa. In 2004, the president of Pakistan Pervez Musharraf awarded him Pride of Performance award in the field of art and literature.

He was born in Landi Arbab village of Peshawar. He graduated from Govt college peshawar and later did master's degree in Pashto, Urdu and English literature from the University of Peshawar.

== Literary career ==
As a lecturer, Dawar was associated with the teaching profession at the various colleges of khyber pakhtunkhwa where he used to taught English literature.He wrote about seventeen research books on Pashto folklore, besides working on Pashto literature, idioms, dictionary, riddles, proverbs, riddles, grammar and poetry. He was also actively engaged in writing articles on Urdu and Pashto literature published in Pashto and Urdu newspapers and literary magazines, including Tatara, a monthly Pashto language newspaper of that time. After he retired from the educational service, he then joined literary organizations such as Pashto Adabi Board (PAB) and Rahman Baba Adabi Jirga (RAJ).

His prominent work included Pashto Tapa’, Taleem Auo Shairy, Rahman Baba Juand, Hamza Baba Aik Mutala, and Pashto Folklore Ke Arr. Some of his work, including a volume of his poetry and research thesis remained unpublished. One of his books A brief history of Pashto literature written in English language remained also unpublished. One of his publications Pashto Tapa, comprising different genres of folk poetry were introduced to curriculum of various universities in the country. He also wrote a 162 pages dictionary titled Sailab which comprises Pashto phrases and idioms. Most of his books are included in the syllabus of MA, PhD and CSS exams.His majority of books were given awards.

== Published articles and poems in magazines (Urdu, Phusto and English) and other work: ==
- The monthly "Rikbar" Peshawar
- The "Laar" Peshawar
- The monthly "Guncha" Peshawar
- The monthly "Leckwal" Peshawar
- The monthly "Amail" Peshawar
- The monthly "Abasin" Karachi & Peshawar
- The Quarterly"Tatara" Pukhto Adabi Board Peshawar
- The Quarterly "Pukhto Pushto Academy Peshawar University
- The Quarterly "Q and " Mardan
- The Books raises "Hujra" hy Karam Satter Yaquli Swati
- The Quarterly "Adaliat" Pakistan Academy of Letters Islamabad
- Pakistani Literature " Pakistan Academy of Letters Islamabad
- The Quarterly "Paigham-i-Ashra" Islamabad
- The monthly "Jamhoor-i-Islam" Peshawar
- The Quarterly "Jarus"Karachi
- The Weekly newspaper Khapalwak Peshawar
- The two monthly paroon mardan- Published articles
- Maraka Mardan- Published Articles
- Literacy Associations Formed:
- Malgri "Shairan" Landi Arbab Peshawar
- Pakhto Adali Tolana" Landi Arbab Peshawar
- Adali Malgari "Landi Arbab Peeshawar
- Pakistan Writer Guiled Peshawar
- "Reman Adali Jarga" Peshawar

Social Work:

- Chairman Local Zakat Committee Landi Arbab Peshawar for one year
- In charge Lihzary Masjid Rizwan, Landi Arbab Peshawar

Institutions served after Retirement:

- Research work on the following for the production CD & DVD
1. Khushal Khan Khattak
2. Rehman Baba'
3. Ghani Khan
4. Humza Shinwari

Note: The Humza Shinwari CD & DVD production has completed so far, the remaining delayed due to non availability of Fana, any how the research on the above writers is available in book form with the Board.

- Pukhto Adabi Board Peshawar on contract since 2005 to date

Assignments:

1. Designation: Research officer
2. Compiling A dictionary of Pashto Pashto Phrases & Idioms, entitled: Sailah one edition comprising ت, پ, ب, ا
3. The second edition of Sailah is in progress
4. Member of the editorial Board of Quarterly "Jatara"
5. As a permanent writer of the Quarterly "Jatara"
6. Edition material of the Quarterly Tatara.
- Assignments in:
- Board of Intermediate and Secondary Education (BISE) Peshawar
- Despatch officer
- Member of the Disciplinary committee
- Jurist scrutinizer
- As Judge of the books (Prose & Verse) offered to the annual competition for Awards
- Abasen Arts Council Peshawar
- Pakistan Academy of Letters (PAL) Islamabad
- National Bank of Pakistan
- Pakistan Writers Guild Peshawar
- As Biography Writer/Character Sketch Writer:
- Preshan Khattak
- Sahibzada Faizi
- Abdul Maleed Afridi
- Dr. Aqbal Naseem Khattak
- Ghazi Sial
- Younus Khalil
- Hamaish Khalil
- Sakir Hussian Imdad
- Ziatoon Bano
- Dr. Syed Zaffar Ullah Bukhari
- Khalil-ur-Rehman Khalil
- Nawaz Tair
- Sardar Khan Fana
- Raza Mohammad
- Dad Muhammad
- Syed Tahir Bukhari
- Syed Masoom Shah Masoon
- Ikram Ullah Bran
- Feroz Afridi

Engagement with:

- Electronic Media-Radio (PBC) Engagement- since 1971
- Books reviewed - 36 (Prose & Versa)
- Writer of Articles on Literacy Topics
- Participated in Muskaiza
- Participated in discussion programmes on literacy topics
- Feature writer Rehman Baba, Khushal Khan Khattack, Ahmed Shah Afridi
- A series on Pashto Tappa Broadcast 23 articles on different aspects so far- 17 articles on the said topics remains
- Translation from Phusto in English
1. Malala Yousaf Zai
2. Nuwar pa Chinaroona- A drama by Nisar Muhammad Khan
- A series of Pashtoon's heroes & scholars
- Stories & Drama for children programme
- Script writing for the PBE
- A series of
1. Black ground of Pashto Proverbs
2. Absent social reforms entitled "Che the la hall nawayay"
- Songs broadcast from Radio by reputed singers- Iqbal's Ghazal translation in Pushto
- Diwa Radio voice of America

Lectures on the various genses of Folkloza on line

- Pukhtun Khwa Radio:
1. Discussion on Rehman Baba (alive)
2. Presenting views on "Aaman"(alive)
- FM Radio Waziristan:

Lectures on literacy topics (on line)

- FM Radio Khyber

Lectures on literature, topics, recorded to compare in my office Pakhto Adabi Board Peshawar

- PTV Peshawar (Home & National)
1. Discussion programmes on Pashto Literature
2. Songs Telecast by singers
3. Script of songs links for songs, to be sung by singers
4. Lecture on "Sofizm" Interweaved about my literary career
- PTV Peshawar outdoor recording.

== Death ==
Dawar Khan was suffering from congestive heart disease and was subsequently admitted to the Lady Reading Hospital for medical treatment. He died of heart complications on 3 June 2018 (16th ramzan ul mubarak 1439) in Peshawar, Pakistan. He is buried in Landi Arbab village of Peshawar.
