= Top Chef (Middle Eastern and North African TV series) =

Reality TV series

- Also known as: Top Chef Middle East; Top Chef MENA
- Arabic: توب شيف
- Genre: Reality competition Cooking show
- Directed by: Wassim Succar
- Presented by: Mona Mosly
- Judges: Bobby Chinn; Maroun Chedid
- Countries of origin: Lebanon; Saudi Arabia
- Original language: Arabic
- No. of seasons: 11

Original release
- Network: LBC
- Release: 26 April 2011 – 17 July 2012
- Network: MBC
- Release: 21 September 2016 – present

Top Chef (Arabic: توب شيف), also known as Top Chef Middle East or Top Chef MENA, is a reality competition television series and an Arabic adaptation of the American television series of the same name. Contestants from across the Arab world compete against one another in culinary challenges and are judged by a panel of professional chefs and other personalities from the food industry, with one or more competitors eliminated in each episode.

The first edition of the show, created by LBC, aired in 2011 and 2012. After a hiatus, the series was relaunched by MBC in 2016. The fifth season of the MBC version was nominated for the 2022 International Emmy Award for Best Non-Scripted Entertainment.

== Show format ==
Each episode typically consists of three segments: the Quickfire Challenge, the Elimination Challenge, and the Judges' Table.

In the Quickfire Challenge, each contestant is required to cook a dish with specific requirements or participate in a culinary-related challenge within one hour or less. A guest judge selects one or more chefs as the best in the challenge. In the Elimination Challenge, the contestants have to prepare one or more dishes to meet the challenge requirements, which are often more complex and time-consuming than the Quickfire. Some Elimination Challenges are individual, while others may require the contestants to work in teams. The chefs then report to the Judges' Table, where the judges deliberate on the best and worst dishes. The chef with the worst dish is eliminated from the competition.

== Seasons ==
Season	Winner	Runner-up	Original air dates	Host	Judge(s)
LBC version
1	(Morocco) Omar El Ghoul	?	26 April – 19 June 2011	Siham Tueni	Joe Barza
2	(Jordan) Selma AbuAlia	?	23 March – 17 July 2012	Jumana Murad	Joe Barza
MBC version
1	(Morocco) Issam Jaafari	(Syria) Hala Ayash	21 September – 14 December 2016	Mona Mosly	Bobby Chinn; Maroun Chedid
2	(Egypt) Mostafa Seif	(Palestine) Asil Sharif	18 October – 27 December 2017	Mona Mosly	Bobby Chinn; Maroun Chedid
3	(Jordan) Ali Ghzawi	(Morocco) Mounir Rochdi	5 December 2018 – 27 February 2019	Mona Mosly	Bobby Chinn; Maroun Chedid
4	(Saudi Arabia) Sama Jaad	(Algeria) Mohamed si Abdelkader	11 December 2019 – 11 March 2020	Mona Mosly	Bobby Chinn; Maroun Chedid
5	(Lebanon) Charbel Hayek	(Bahrain) Naseem Rasrummani	13 October 2021 – 19 January 2022	Mona Mosly	Bobby Chinn; Maroun Chedid
6	(Tunisia) Aïmen Samhoud	(Lebanon) Abdullah Bekri	14 September – 7 December 2022	Mona Mosly	Bobby Chinn; Maroun Chedid
7	(Palestine) Tareq Taha	(Algeria) Mohamed si Abdelkader	27 December 2023 – 6 March 2024	Mona Mosly	Bobby Chinn; Maroun Chedid
8	(Egypt) Shehab Medhat	(Tunisia) Alaeddine Zitoun	10 December 2024 – 25 February 2025	Mona Mosly	Bobby Chinn; Maroun Chedid
9	(Palestine) Ruba Khoury	(Egypt) Ahmed Allwani	19 November 2025 – 10 February 2026	Mona Mosly	Bobby Chinn; Maroun Chedid
