= Charbel Hayek =

Lebanese chef

- Born: Beirut, Lebanon
- Education: French School of Excellence
- Culinary career
- Cooking style: Lebanese, Levantine, and Eastern Mediterranean

Charbel Hayek is a Lebanese chef based in Los Angeles, known for his appearances on the television series Top Chef. His cooking features Lebanese, Levantine, and Eastern Mediterranean influences, often with a California twist.

== Early life and education ==
Born in Beirut, Lebanon, Hayek learned cooking from his mother. After graduating from high school, he left Lebanon and moved to Paris to study at the French School of Excellence.

== Career ==
Hayek worked under Chef Josiah Citrin at the two-Michelin-starred restaurant, Mélisse in Los Angeles, for nearly three years.

In 2021 and at the age of 24, he won the Season 5 of the Arabic version of Top Chef.

After winning his season of the Arabic-language edition of the cooking series, Hayek was chosen to compete in Top Chef: World All-Stars, making him the youngest and least experienced chef among the contestants. However, he won the season's first Elimination Challenge. Although he was eventually eliminated, he had few setbacks throughout the competition.

He later relocated to Florida to work as a private chef, eventually making his way back to LA.

Hayek opened his first restaurant, Ladyhawk, a name inspired by his mother.

His second restaurant in Los Angeles, Laya, combines farmers market ingredients with California, Lebanese, and other Levantine flavors. In 2025, a branch of Laya Restaurant was opened in San Diego’s Gaslamp Quarter.

In 2025, Hayek opened BarVera on Bedford Street in Stamford, Connecticut.

== Restaurants ==
- BarVera in Stamford, Connecticut
- Ladyhawk in West Hollywood, California
- Laya in Hollywood and San Diego, California
