= Amy Thielen =

US television personality

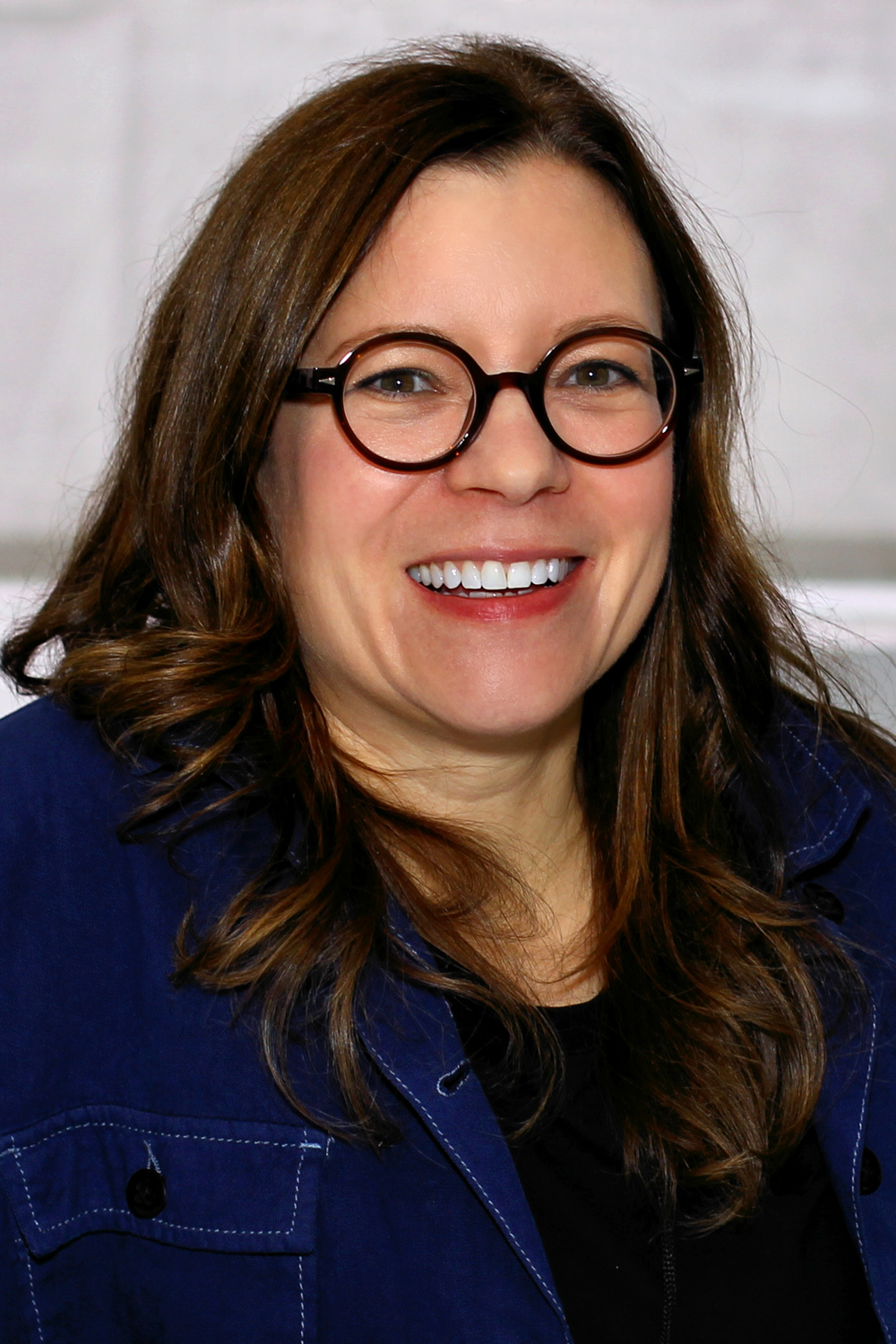
Thielen at the 2023 Texas Book Festival

Amy Thielen is a chef, food writer, and television personality who focuses on Midwestern cooking and food culture. She is the author of the James Beard award-winning cookbook The New Midwestern Table (Clarkson Potter, 2013) ISBN 978-0307954879 and Give a Girl a Knife (Clarkson Potter, 2017) ISBN 978-0307954909. She was also the host of Heartland Table, which debuted in September 2013 on Food Network; season two premiered in March 2014.

== Background and personal life ==
Thielen grew up in rural northern Minnesota and graduated from Macalester College in St. Paul, Minnesota, in 1997 with a degree in English. In 1999, she moved to New York City to attend cooking school and cooked professionally for seven years in the kitchens of chefs David Bouley (Danube, Bouley), Jean-Georges Vongerichten (66), Daniel Boulud (DB Bistro Moderne), and Shea Gallante (Cru). In 2008, she and her family moved from Brooklyn to the countryside near their hometown. Thielen has written for publications such as Men’s Journal and Saveur. Her articles in the Minneapolis Star Tribune won her a James Beard Foundation Award for journalism in 2011. Thielen's recipes have been featured in Food & Wine Magazine, Parade Magazine, People Magazine and on National Public Radio. In spring of 2014 her cookbook won the James Beard Foundation Cookbook Award in American Cooking. Her television show was also nominated for a James Beard Foundation Broadcast and New Media Award in Television Program. Thielen is married to visual artist Aaron Spangler. Her aunt, uncle and cousins own and operate Thielen Meats of Pierz.

== Television show and book ==
According to a Random House press release, "The simultaneous launch of Thielen’s television show, Heartland Table, and the publication of her first cookbook, THE NEW MIDWESTERN TABLE, marks the first time an author’s cookbook and television show have both been produced internally by Random House." Heartland Table is produced by Random House Studio and Lidia Bastianich’s Tavola Productions. The New Midwestern Table is published by Clarkson Potter, an imprint of The Crown Publishing Group, a division of Random House, LLC, a Penguin Random House Company.

== See also ==
- List of chefs
