= Itamae =

Cook in a Japanese kitchen

An itamae (板前; a cook, chef) is a cook in a Japanese kitchen or a chef of a large restaurant. The term can be translated literally as "in front of the board," referring to a cutting board.

== Itamae as sushi chef ==
In the western world, an itamae is often associated with sushi (also commonly referred to as "sushi chefs"). In Japan, becoming an itamae of sushi requires years of training and apprenticeship.

After several years of training, an apprentice may be promoted to the position of "wakiita," which translates to "near the cutting board." The wakiita's duties include daily preparation of the fresh ingredients, such as preparing blocks of fish, grating ginger, and slicing scallions. Eventually, the apprentice might begin to prepare sushi for clients with take-away orders. The wakiita also learns proper ways to interact and treat restaurant's customers by observing senior itamae.

After additional years of training as a wakiita, the apprentice can be appointed as an itamae, fully authorized to stand in front of the cutting board.

It is a common Japanese legend that a truly great itamae-san ("san" is an honorific suffix) should be able to create nigirizushi in which all of the rice grains face the same direction.

Itamae training is conducted all over the world, including Japan, the USA and the UK. The process can take from 2 to 20 years.

The terms “Itamae” and “Shokunin” are used as a title for the chef. “Itamae” refers to a skilled sushi chef, while "Shokunin" means someone skilled at a profession.

While it is not necessary to be Japanese in order to be considered an itamae, non Japanese must prove themselves worthy of such a title. Itamae traditionally wear a uniform of a white hat, white coat and apron, and frequently wear their knife in a sheath off the waist.

Dave Lowry, in his book "The Connoisseur's Guide to Sushi: Everything You Need to Know About Sushi" he describes the four criteria to judge a good itamae:

1. How he handles the food.
2. How he handles his food utensils.
3. How he treats his clients
4. How he behaves, moves and works.

A profession traditionally reserved mainly for men, Yuki Chizui is one of the few female sushi chefs and in 2010 she opened Akihabara, Tokyo, the first sushi restaurant with an all-female staff.
