= Egg fried rice protests =

Chinese internet protest

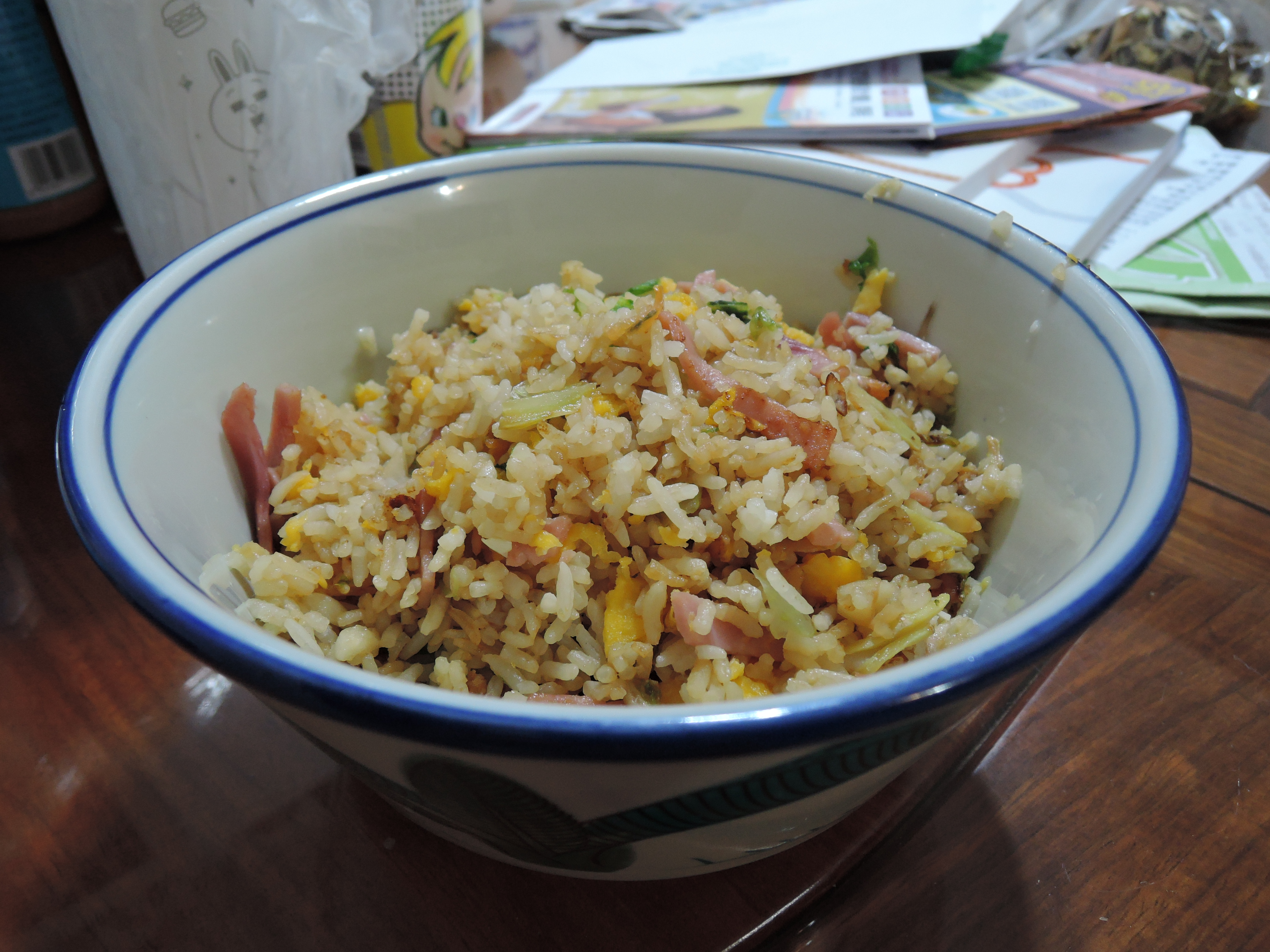
A typical example of egg fried rice

Some internet users have posted about egg fried rice to mock Mao Anying, son of Mao Zedong, around the date of his birth on October 24 or his death on November 25. Posts have been blocked or removed by Chinese officials; one poster was reportedly jailed for 10 days in 2021.

== Background ==
Mao Anying worked on the staff of General Peng Dehuai in northeastern Korea during the Korean War. According to some accounts, on the morning of November 25, 1950, he was making a pan of egg fried rice when he was killed in a napalm attack by American forces drawn to the cooking fire. However, veteran Wang Tiancheng, the fried rice story's source, did not claim that the fire drew the enemy's attention but that the attack had been ordered by Douglas MacArthur the previous day; Mao and the rest of Peng's staff had been reviewing intelligence reports of an imminent attack on the night of November 24. Wang's story makes the fried rice an explanation for Mao and Gao Ruixian being the only people in the wooden building, while Peng and other officers were in bomb shelter caves.

The Chinese Academy of History has supported the clarification that the attack was a planned one, by releasing documents showing that the United States had intercepted radio communications leading to discovery of the headquarters' location. The Wall Street Journal alleged that the Academy was rewriting history.

Some internet users have referenced the story by posting egg fried rice recipes or references yearly during October or November to mock Mao's death.

== Internet posts ==
In October 2020, food blogger Wang Gang posted an egg fried rice recipe. He was accused of using the video post as a "malicious political innuendo" insulting to Mao's legacy and subsequently posted an apology. On 27 November 2023, two days after the death anniversary of Anying, a video of Wang preparing the dish was posted on Weibo. The video was subsequently taken down and Wang, in an apology video, said his team uploaded the video without his knowledge. He also declared he would not prepare any egg fried rice nor post any videos about it. As a jab at this, Republic of China Foreign Minister Joseph Wu showed fried rice which he called "Freedom Fried Rice" in a video celebrating Christmas of 2023.

On October 23, 2021, a regional branch of China Unicom posted a fried rice recipe on Weibo; the account was suspended, reportedly because the post "insulted the People's Volunteers". A man who posted a comment on October 8, 2021, claiming that "without egg fried rice, China would be just like North Korea" was reportedly jailed for ten days.
