= Laura Frankel =

American kosher chef, author and restaurateur

- Born: Laura Charlene Johnson; January 3, 1961 (age 64); Chicago, Illinois, US
- Occupation(s): Chef, author
- Parent(s): Gunnard and Charlene Johnson

Laura Frankel (born Laura Charlene Johnson on January 3, 1961) is an American chef, author, and restaurateur. Frankel specializes in Jewish cuisine.

Frankel is the author of Jewish Cooking for All Seasons (Agate) and Jewish Slow Cooker Recipes (Agate).

Frankel is the former head chef and founder of the Shallots restaurants. She opened her first restaurant in 1999, offering kosher fine dining with a produce-driven menu. Frankel opened Shallots NY in 2000 in midtown Manhattan. In 2004, she moved her Chicago restaurant to Skokie (a suburb with a large Jewish population outside of Chicago) and created Shallots Bistro.

In 2007 Frankel was appointed executive chef at Wolfgang Puck Kosher Catering working alongside Wolfgang Puck in the Hollywood and Highland Kosher Kitchen in LA and as the executive chef at the Spertus Institute for Jewish studies in Chicago. In 2013, Frankel was honored as an innovator in Modern Kosher Cuisine at Kosherfeast during the 25th-anniversary celebration of Kosherfest.

== See also ==
- List of chefs
