= Tala Bashmi =

Bahraini chef and restaurateur

- تاله بشمي
- Born: 1988 or 1989 (age 35–36); Bahrain
- Occupation(s): chef and restaurateur
- Culinary career
- Current restaurant(s): Fusions by Tala (2017–present)

Tala Bashmi (Arabic: تاله بشمي; born 1988 or 1989) is a Bahraini chef and restaurateur. Since 2017, she has been chef patron of Fusions by Tala, a restaurant within the Gulf Hotel Bahrain Convention & Spa in Manama. She also appeared on cooking television shows, notably a 2019 appearance on Top Chef Middle East.

== Biography ==
Bashmi was born in Bahrain in 1988 or 1989. Growing up, Bashmi's father, who was a writer, often took her to marketplaces to buy food and taught her how to cook with local ingredients. She recalls that her father would introduce her to "weird things and strange dishes" such as pigeon, which encouraged her to experiment and try new foods.

Bashmi played for the Bahrain women's national football team for seven years. Afterwards, she studied art in university and opened a home business called Baked by T, which sold desserts and reportedly "became an instant hit" in the country according to Harper's Bazaar Arabia. She began her culinary career as a trainee at the Gulf Hotel Bahrain Convention & Spa in Manama. While pursuing a master's degree at the Culinary Arts Academy Switzerland, she trained at Hotel Les Trois Rois and Restaurant Prisma. She returned to Bahrain in 2014.

Bashmi became chef patron of Fusions, a restaurant in the Gulf Hotel, in 2017. She was a runner-up on the fourth season of the cooking competition show Top Chef Middle East in 2019. The following year, Bashmi's restaurant reopened under a new name, Fusions by Tala, after a menu redesign and expansion of restaurant capacity and staff. In December 2021, The World's 50 Best Restaurants awarded Bashmi their MENA's Best Female Chef Award 2022. Danielle Doporto in The National wrote in 2022 that the restaurant menu was reflective of "Bashmi's prestigious training, her love for global street eats and nostalgic home cooking, and most of all, her passion for imbuing food with Middle Eastern flair."
