= Yuki Chizui =

Japanese sushi chef and restaurant manager

Yoshiaki "Yuki" Chizui is a Japanese sushi chef. She is the founder manager of the restaurant “Nadeshico Sushi” in Akihabara, Tokyo, the first sushi restaurant with an all-female staff. Since the second half of the year 2022 the webpage states that the restaurant is no longer operating in Akihabara but "irregularly" at "another location" (as of June 2026).

== Early life ==
She studied art while working part-time at a sushi restaurant located in Tsukiji fish market. When she finished her studies at university and after struggling to find work in the art world, she decided to set up her own restaurant, challenging sexism in Japan. Women traditionally cannot be sushi chefs and only work in informal restaurants, as high-end restaurants are dominated by men. For one of the sons of sushi Michelin chef Jiro Ono, one of the reasons women are not allowed to be “itamae” in restaurants is because they menstruate. Another belief shared in Japanese culture is that women's hands are warmer, which makes them sticky when shaping rice.

== Career ==
In 2010, Nadeshico Sushi opened in a corner of Tokyo's Akihabara district, where Chizui is the manager and vice president and where she and her colleagues are challenging the traditionalism of the sushi world. Nadeshiko Sushi is the only sushi restaurant in the world where all the chefs are women, as the industry is predominantly male-dominated.

In her restaurant, she does not wear the typical white uniform, but rather colorful kimonos or yukatas with accessories, and her staff wear makeup, moving away from the typical, classic image of a chef. According to her, they participate in the kawaii movement that society associates with femininity.

Chizui is also working to train more women to follow in her footsteps, hiring female chefs and opened a school to give women the opportunity to learn how to make sushi. As a restaurant owner, she also tries to do business with other female suppliers. In fact, when she first started going to the Tsukiji market to buy fish, she had to put up with distasteful comments from the other chefs. According to the BBC, Chizui had to turn to the owner of a boat crewed by women from Yamaguchi Prefecture to supply her with fish every week.
