= Yianni Papoutsis =

British restaurateur

- Born: UK
- Culinary career
- Cooking style: Street food / Fast food
- Current restaurant: None
- Previous restaurants: MeatEasy; MEATliquor Singapore; MEATwagon (street food truck); MEATliquor; MEATmarket; MEATmission; MEATliquor Brighton; MEATliquor Leeds; MEATliquor Queensway; MEATliquor SW11; MEATliquorED; MEATliquor Croydon; MEATliquor Kings X; MEATliquor Brixton; MEATliquor N1; and radio station MEATtransMISSION

Yianni Papoutsis (Greek: Γιάννη Παπουτσής) is the co-founder and former Creative Director of the Meat chain of restaurants. He previously worked at the English National Ballet as a production technician. The business started as one of the first street food trucks in the UK, the Meat Wagon, and after teaming with Scott Collins and opening a pop-up restaurant, they opened thirteen restaurants, including twelve in the UK and one in Singapore which closed. He is now a consultant in the hospitality and entertainment industry.

== Biography ==
Papoutsis was born in England, and during his childhood, he split his time between there and Greece. As a teenager he moved to Denmark to find work. Papoutsis worked for the English National Ballet for fifteen years as a production technician. His first experience of cooking burgers for the public was at US festival Burning Man. In 2009, he opened a street food van serving gourmet hamburgers called MEATwagon as a hobby. The first truck was vandalised and destroyed, and the second was stolen. This meant that Papoutsis was forced to cook outside on rented equipment in all weathers.

He met Scott Collins in 2010 in a car park in Peckham, South London where the MEATwagon was running. Collins invited Papoutsis to pull up at one of his pubs, and the two would eventually become business partners. In 2011, they opened a pop-up restaurant, #MEATeasy above a pub in New Cross, London on 10 January after having conceived it with Collins on New Years Day. It was only after opening this restaurant that he was able to leave his job at the English National Ballet. He opened his first permanent location entitled MEATliquor near Oxford Street on 11 November 2011. MEATmarket at Covent Garden, and MEATmission in Hoxton shortly followed which was then followed by their radio station MEATtransMISSION.com. MEATliquor Brighton opened in September 2013. and MEATliquor Leeds in September 2014. They went on to open MEATliquor Queensway, MEATliquor SW11, MEATliquorED, MEATliquor Croydon, MEATliquor Kings X, MEATliquor Brixton, MEATliquor N1 and MEATliquor Singapore.

Papoutsis was invited to speak on a committee about fast food start-up companies at Downing Street and advised on policy proposals relating to the economic and social benefits afforded by the food and beverage industry. He launched a cookbook with Collins in September 2014, co-written with DBC Pierre entitled The MEATliquor Chronicles. Collins and Papoutsis' research trips to the United States for the cookbook were covered by GQ. He has been described as "a pioneer of street food" by Bloomberg Businessweek. He has collaborated with numerous Michelin starred chefs including Fergus Henderson, Nieves Barragan, Michael O'Hare and Sally Abe and with Gresham Blake on men's suits and performance underwear. He was named in the Evening Standard as one of the 1000 Most Influential People in London in both 2012 & 2013, in January 2015, by Debrett as one of Britain's 500 most influential people and in 2016 he was included in Restaurant magazine's 'Power List' of the 100 most powerful people in the restaurant industry.
