= John Shields (chef) =

American chef

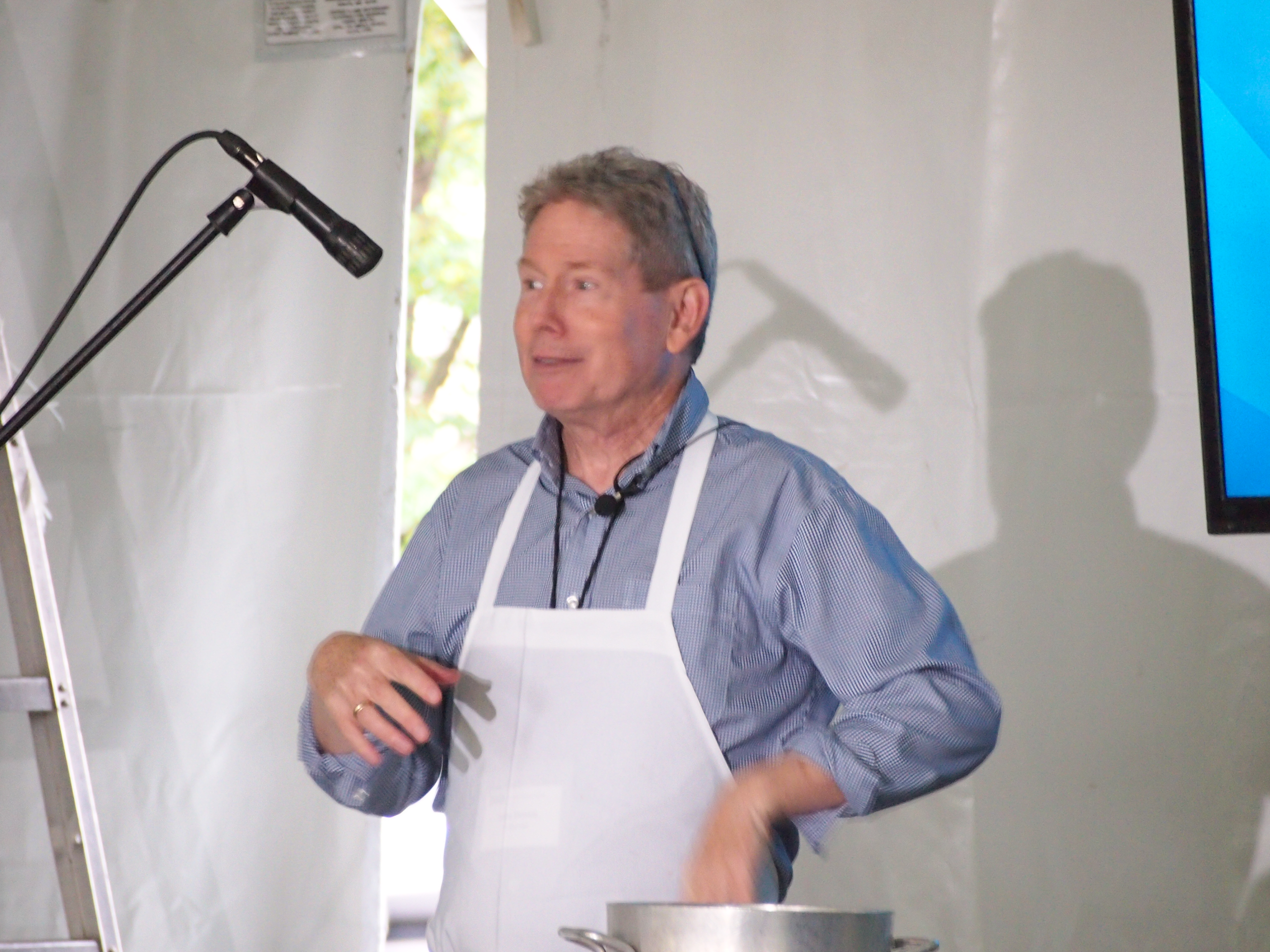
- Born: 1951 May 5
- Occupation: chef

John Shields is an American chef, food writer, and host of the PBS television shows Chesapeake Bay Cooking with John Shields and Coastal Cooking with John Shields.

== Life ==
He is a native of Baltimore, Maryland.

Shields studied at the Peabody Conservatory of Music; he moved to Provincetown / Cape Cod with aspirations of becoming a rock star, and played piano in local bars. One day an injured friend asked John to work his shift in the kitchen of a popular Cape Cod inn. This led to many years as a restaurant chef & owner, author, and host of two national public television series. In the 1980s, Shields moved to Northern California, where he joined the New American Food revolution. He was executive chef at A La Carte, a French restaurant in Berkeley. Shields opened his first restaurant, Gertie's Chesapeake Bay Café, in 1983 in Berkeley's Gourmet Ghetto. In the late 1990s he returned to Baltimore, and opened Gertrude's at the Baltimore Museum of Art. Serving locally sourced food, Gertrude's received positive press in Food & Wine, Travel & Leisure, the Washington Post, Edible DC, the Baltimore Sun, and has been a multi-year winner of Baltimore Magazine’s “Best of Baltimore,”.

Shields specializes in regional American coastal cuisine, and in particular the cuisine of his native Chesapeake Bay region. He is a proponent of slow food and local food, and is active in related organizations such as the Chesapeake Sustainable Business Alliance, Slow Food, and the Chef's Collaborative.

Shields is gay and works with his husband, John Gilligan, at Gertrude's.

== Television ==
- Chesapeake Bay Cooking with John Shields (1998), PBS
- Coastal Cooking with John Shields (2005), PBS
- Food Network

== Books ==
- The Chesapeake Bay Cookbook (Addison-Wesley, 1990)
- The Chesapeake Bay Crab Cookbook (Addison-Wesley, 1992)
- Chesapeake Bay Cooking with John Shields (Broadway Books, 1998)
- Chesapeake Bay Cooking with John Shields, 25th anniversary edition (Johns Hopkins University Press, 2015)
- The New Chesapeake Kitchen (Johns Hopkins University Press, 2018)
