= Eric Aubriot =

French-American chef

Éric Aubriot
- Born: 1972-05-15; Paris, France
- Education: Les Pres d'Eugenie
- Culinary career
- Cooking style: French

Éric Aubriot (born 15 May 1972, in Paris) is a French-American chef.

Aubriot moved from France to the United States as a child. He began his career training under Michel Guérard at the Michelin Three-Star Les Pres d'Eugenie in Eugenie Les Bains, France, where he learned some of the fine points of French cuisine. Aubriot apprenticed under Chef Alain Ducasse at the Louis XV hotel in Monaco, another Michelin Three-Star restaurant.

After spending two years in France, Aubriot returned to the United States and settled in Chicago. He first worked as a pastry cook at Gypsy. Aubriot then accepted a position as sous-chef and then chef de cuisine under Jacky Pluton at the Mobil Four-Star Carlos in Highland Park, Illinois.

Aubriot opened his first restaurant with his wife at the time, Stephanie, in May 1998 (named after themselves) to commercial and critical acclaim. He went to Tournesol, a french cuisine bistro in Lincoln Square, as a consulting chef in 2002. In 2004 he moved to Hotel 71's Fuse. In mid-2007 he was on the middle-eastern Alhambra The year 2008 saw him in the Italian Il Fiasco in Andersonville.

In March 2011 he is in his Izakaya Lure in Chinatown.

As of 2013, he primarily resides in upstate New York where he continues his culinary career.

He has been nominated twice for the James Beard Rising Star award.
