= Ali Salem Edbowa =

Ali Edbowa is a professional chef specializing in Emirati cuisine from the United Arab Emirates. He has had three cooking shows on television, and is known for his popular restaurant Mezlai in the Emirates Palace hotel, the first authentic Emirati restaurant in the UAE, in which he works as the executive chef. Edbowa specialises mostly in Emirati cuisine, having a mastery over several local dishes. His passion for cooking grew while during a trip overseas.

In 2007, Edbowa was named best Arabic chef by the Emirates International Salon Culinaire.
