= John Pisto =

Chef John Pisto
- Born: John Pisto; January 20, 1940 (age 86); Monterey, California, U.S.
- Occupations: TV personality, culinary chef, restaurateur
- Years active: 1960-present
- Website: http://www.pisto.com

John Pisto, also known as Chef John Pisto, (born January 20, 1940) is an American culinary arts chef and host of Monterey's Cooking, a daily program which is aired five times a week on the AmericanLife (ALN) Network as well as the Comcast Cable Network. He was also the proprietor and owner of The Whaling Station, a noted prime steak restaurant located in Monterey County.

== Personal ==
Pisto and his wife, both grandparents, reside in Monterey.
