= Cellphone (chef) =

American chef and activist

- Occupation: Chef

Cellphone, also known as Ginger Espice and Sofi Peligras, is an American vegan chef and transgender-rights activist.

== Career ==
In 2009, Cellphone and a partner started Hella Vegan Eats, a food truck in Oakland, California's Uptown Arts District. In 2019, Cellphone started a vegan popup restaurant called Gay4U in West Oakland; the Latinx restaurant eventually became permanent.

Cellphone created a service initiative at the restaurant, "Trans POC Always Eat Free", to address and bring attention to the disparities in food security among transgender people who are also persons of color; both groups experience higher levels of food insecurity than the population in general, and those who are members of both groups are at even higher risk. The initiative was inspired by the Black Panthers' free breakfast initiative and by the activism of trans women of color Marsha P. Johnson and Sylvia Rivera. The initiate has inspired other restaurants, with Mis Tacones implementing a "Trans POC Always Eat Free" rule at their restaurant after visiting Gay4U.

In 2022, Cellphone took the restaurant on a national popup tour, and the Trans POC Always Eat Free initiative spread to other restaurants in the United States. Later that year, Bon Appetit named Cellphone one of their Heads of the Table. Gay4U was awarded a Now Award by Them in June 2022.

In addition to running Gay4U, Cellphone hosts trans skate events, helping raise money for organisations that support the transgender community.
