= Warren Chow =

Warren Chow (c. 1992) is a Chinese Canadian chef and executive chef of Wildlight Kitchen + Bar. In 2023, Chow became the first chef to win Michelin Guide Vancouver's Young Chef Award.

== Personal life ==
Chow was born in Vancouver, Canada circa 1992.

== Career ==
Chow previously worked at The Pear Tree Restaurant in Burnaby, where he apprenticed under Chef Scott Jaeger. He later moved to a position at the Delta Hotels in Burnaby and then transferred to a Kelowna location. After working for Delta Hotels, Chow worked at the Terrace Restaurant located on the Mission Hill Family Estate.

In 2017, Chow became sous chef at Juniper Kitchen + Bar, located in Vancouver's Chinatown. In 2019, he became the executive chef at Juniper Kitchen + Bar. He later worked for the German restaurant Bauhaus. In 2020 during his time at Bauhaus, Chow, alongside several other local chefs, cooked 600 liters of soup for those in need during the COVID-19 pandemic.

In February 2022, Chow opened Wildlight Kitchen + Bar at 107-5380 University Boulevard near the University of British Columbia with Pattison Food Group. That same year, Chow participated in the 2022 Culinary World Cup in Luxemberg as a member of Culinary Team BC, which won the gold medal. At the time, Chow was the culinary director of Vancouver Private Dining.

In May 2023, The Georgia Straight awarded Chow and Wildlight Kitchen + Bar first place in the 26th annual Golden Plates Awards for New Restaurant and the Pacific Northwest categories, while also being recognized in 4 other categories. In November that same year, he won bronze at the Canada's Great Kitchen Party 2023 Vancouver Regional Qualifier.

Chow also works as a private chef and culinary director with the company Sunshine Coast Catering & Private Chefs.
