= Joe Barza =

Lebanese chef

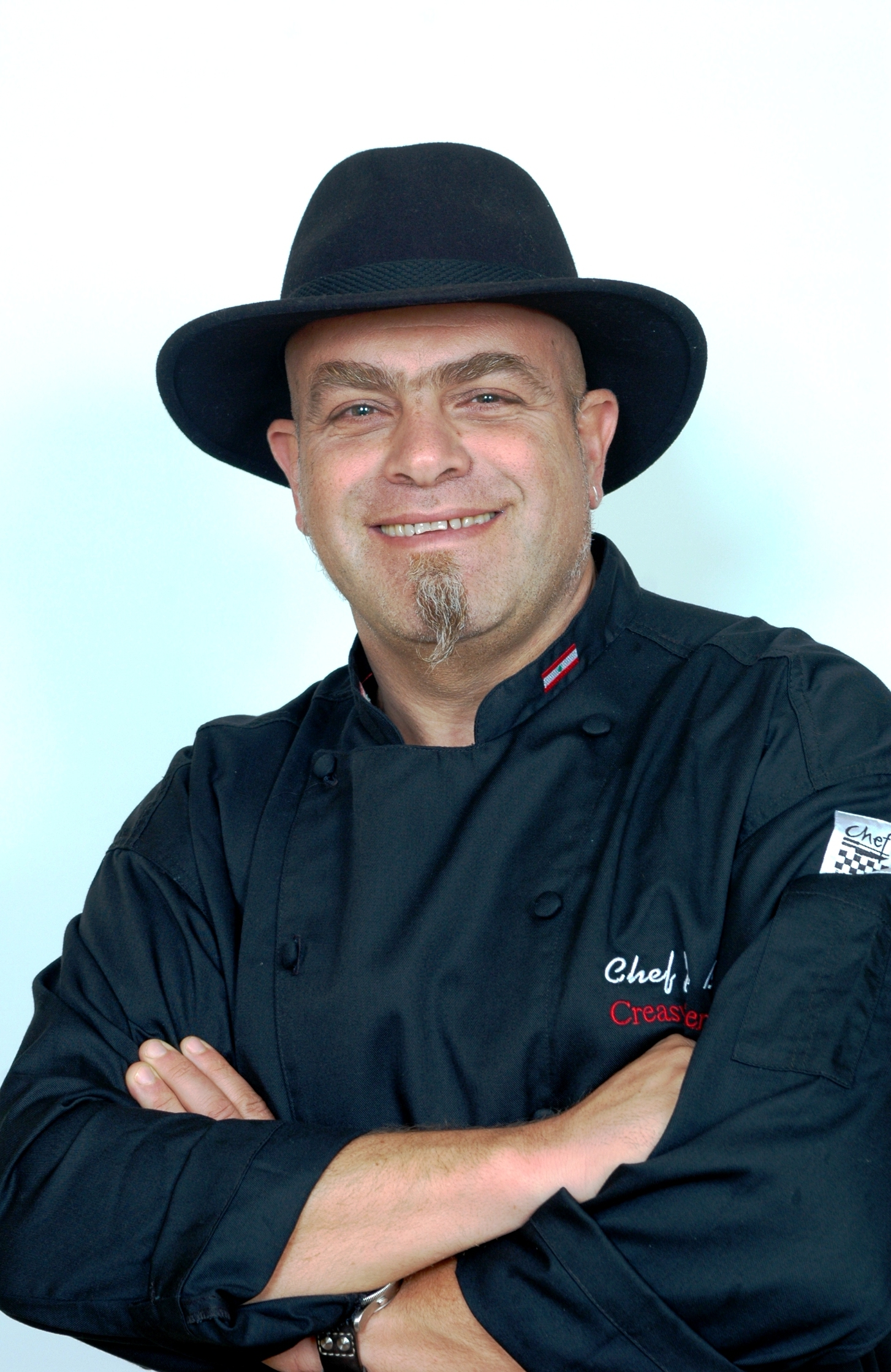
- Joe Barza
- Born: 11 August 1963 (age 63); Tyre, Lebanon
- Occupations: chef, television personality, and culinary consultant
- Spouse: Mireille El Zammar
- Children: Karim, Noura
- Website: www.joebarza.com

Joe Barza (born 11 August 1963) is a Lebanese chef, television personality, and culinary consultant. Barza is known for co-hosting the Middle Eastern version of the TV program Top Chef.

== Early life ==
Born in Tyre, Lebanon, Barza was first influenced by traditional Lebanese cuisine as a child in his mother's kitchen. Growing up in a war torn country, Barza had no choice but to integrate in one of the many popular militias of the time. Barza served as a personal bodyguard to a personality and major key player in the Lebanese war, before deciding in 1980 to abandon the life of war, and seek better more sustainable opportunities. After enlisting at the Hotel School of Arts in Lebanon,

== Head chef ==
The Lebanese civil war officially ended in 1990, and three years later Barza decided to go back to his home country. In Jounieh, Lebanon, he was offered his first head chef position at "Century Park Hotel". Barza was responsible for preparing banquets for up to 4,000 people, weekly outside caterings for up to 1,000 people, in charge of 20 permanent chefs, and assuming other hotel positions such as hotel manager on duty. Barza stayed with the establishment for eight years, before the hotel changed ownership. His second head chef position came directly afterward, when he was appointed head chef for "The Chase", chain of international restaurants, who had up to 9 outlets in Lebanon and around the world.

== Consultant chef ==
In 2010, Barza started his own company, "Joe Barza Culinary Consultancy". The company was to be built around his personal experience and exposure to the different trends and techniques of the culinary world. The company's main scope of work is dealing with all aspects of restaurant and catering operations, including concept formulation, menu elaboration, kitchen design, kitchen personnel recruiting, pre-opening strategy formulation, opening strategy formulation, post-opening follow-up, cost control, and staff training. In addition to the corporate services, Barza is a consultant for Salon Culinaire of Lebanon "HORECA".

== Awards and participation in international culinary event ==
Barza has won awards and recognition:

2010	Guest Appearance as Master Chef in "Gourmet Abu Dhabi 2010". Demonstrate Lebanese Cuisine in the "Lo Mejor de La Gastronomia" International Food Festival in Alicante, Spain; Demonstrate Lebanese Cuisine in the "Sydney International Food Festival"
2009	Head Chef Les 6eme Jeux de la Francophonie (catering up to 25,000 meals Per Day)
2008	Head of the Lebanese delegation to the "Coupe du Monde de la Pâtisserie" Head of the Lebanese delegation to the "Bakery World Cup" Demonstrate Lebanese cuisine at the "Culinary Institute of America" Demonstrate Lebanese cuisine at Les Etoiles de Mougins

== Television ==
Barza is co-hosting Season One of "Top Chef" with magazine and restaurant owner Siham Tueni.
