= Ali Ghzawi =

Jordanian chef

- Occupation: Chef

Ali Ghzawi (Arabic: علي الغزاوي) is a Jordanian chef.

== Career ==
During high school and at the age 17, Ghzawi started his career by selling sandwiches. He attended the Royal Academy of Culinary Arts, at the age of 19. After that, he completed internships at the Four Seasons, Ritz Carlton, W Hotels, and the two-star Michelin restaurant. In 2019, Ghzawi won Top Chef Middle East. He was the first Jordanian to win the title and also the youngest chef ever crowned. He competed in the cooking competition series Top Chef: World All-Stars, in 2023. He ultimately finished in fourth place. His live cooking shows are broadcast on TVs across the region. Ghzawi is founder and CEO of Alee, a restaurant and culinary center in Jordan, that offers cooking lessons and demos.
