= Enzo Oliveri =

Italian-born celebrity chef (born 1963)

Vincenzo Oliveri (born 3 February 1963) is an Italian-born celebrity chef who specialises in Italian cuisine. He was born in Palermo in the region of Sicily. He has been a resident of the United Kingdom since moving to England in 1990. Better known as Enzo Oliveri or "The Sicilian Chef".

Representing today the federation Italian Chefs [FIC] in the United Kingdom, Oliveri is on the board on the International Hospitality Council [IHC] and is Judge of the Italian National Young Chefs and Young Chef Olympiad [YCO] in India. Oliveri has also worked with several Italian companies and brands, firstly with Fratelli La Bufala UK, and was the keener of more than six restaurants and of a kitchen school in Bromley, London.

Oliveri is the official Executive Chef to the Italian National Cycling team and Alitalia UK.

He made a great contribution to the spread of Italian cuisine in England and can be seen at work in the Channel 4 programme "Kitchen Impossible" with Chef Michel Roux Jr. He is in the series "Sicily with Aldo & Enzo" Aldo Zilli on another british television station. He has done a cooking show with Gordon Ramsey. They went octopus hunting in Sicily for the show F Word. Oliveri has also worked with Paul Hollywood for City Bakers on the Food Network. Oliveri is now chef patron at Tasting Sicily Enzo's Kitchen in Piccadilly. Enzo Oliveri has been Awarded by the President of Italy, the honorary Cavaliere Ufficiale OSI, the equivalent of the English MBE form the work done has an Ambassador of Italy in the World true Hospitality Food and Culture.
