= Freddie Bitsoie =

Navajo chef

Freddie J. Bitsoie is a Navajo chef and author. He was the Executive Chef for the Mitsitam Native Foods Café at the National Museum of the American Indian.

Bitsoie was born in Utah to Diné parents and moved frequently between Albuquerque's Sandía Mountains and California. He attended the University of New Mexico, majoring in cultural anthropology with a minor in art history before attending culinary school in Scottsdale, Arizona.

== See also ==
- List of Navajo people
