= Karen Keygnaert =

Belgian born chef

- Born: Flanders, Belgium
- Culinary career
- Cooking style: Asian/European fusion
- Rating: Michelin stars 2012-2016
- Current restaurant: Cantine Copine
- Previous restaurant: Restaurant A'Qi

Karen Keygnaert is a Belgian-born chef, who won a Michelin star at Restaurant A'Qi. She has since opened Cantine Copine, where she announced she would not be pursuing Michelin stars.

== Early life and career ==
Keygnaert was born in the Flanders region of Belgium, and is a native Flemish speaker. In 2009, she opened Restaurant A'Qi with Arnold Hanbuckers. The restaurant was awarded a Michelin star in 2012, and following Hanbucker's retirement the following year, she retained until 2016. At the time, she was the only female chef in Flanders to hold a star. In 2013, she co-authored with Hanbuckers a cookbook based on the dishes served at the restaurant. Keygnaert cooked on board the Taste Boat during Taste Week in 2015, which was a boat which sailed from Bruges to Eeklo. She served seafood on the vessel, based on the menu of Restaurant A'Qi.

When she decided to leave Restaurant A'Qi and open Cantine Copine, she decided not to pursue Michelin stars. Keygnaert felt it generated different expectations from diners and made the restaurant more exclusion, only being used for special occasions. Keygnaert was not the first Belgian chef to refuse Michelin stars, as Jo Bussels, Christophe Van den Berghe and Frederick Dhooge all had done so previously. When launching Cantine Copine, Keygnaert did so with an entirely female staff. She stated this wasn't deliberate but was done to the individual personality and competencies of the staff members hired. Some of those staff members came with Keygnaert from Restaurant A'Qi, and the restaurant offers an evolution of the same menu.
