= Tony Khan (chef) =

Bangladeshi chef

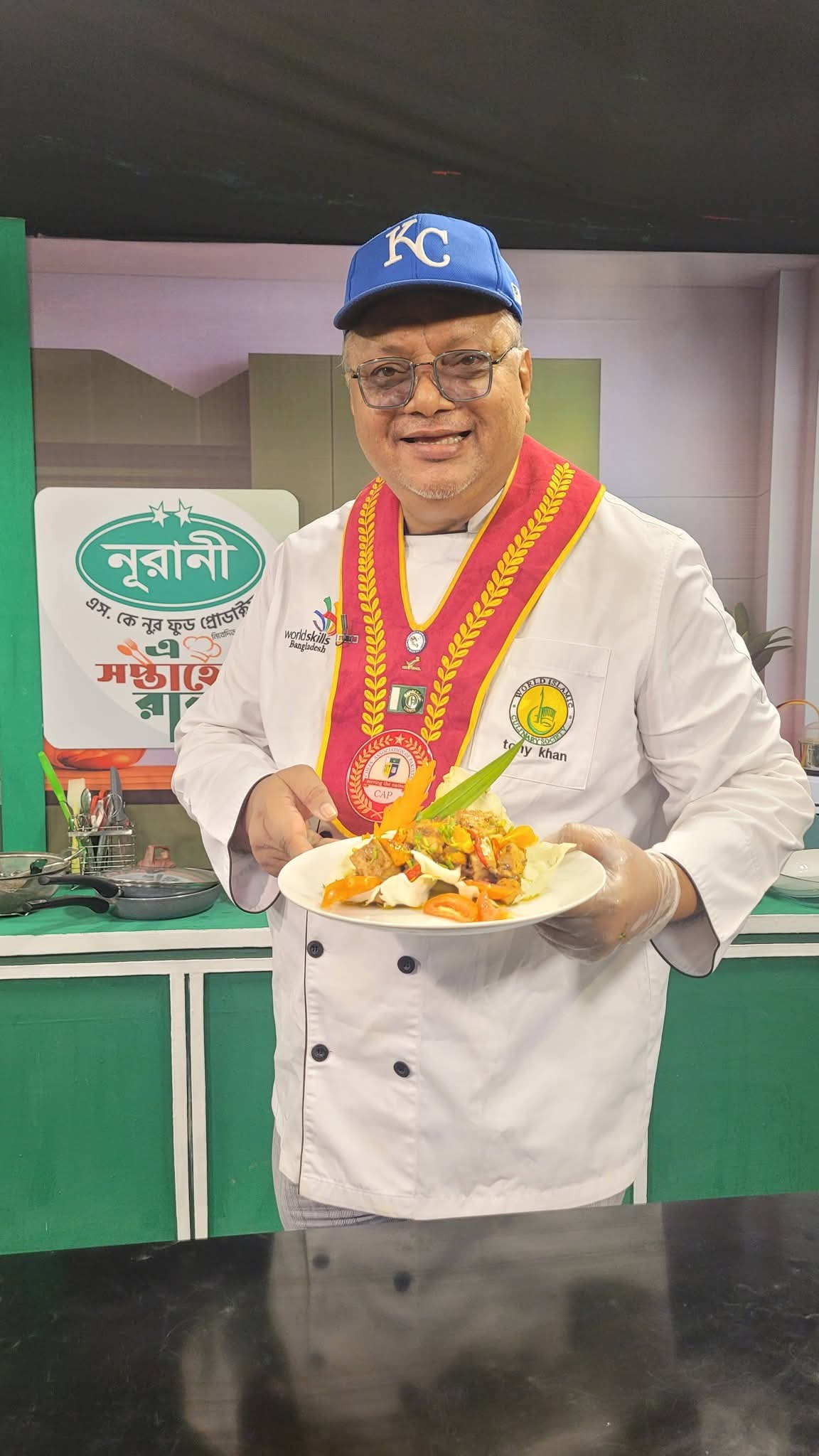
- Tony Khan
- Born: Tony Khan; September 6, 1961 (age 65); Khulna, East Pakistan, Pakistan
- Education: University of Sydney; RMIT University
- Occupation: International master chef Tony Khan CEO founder TKISD

Tony Khan is a Bangladeshi chef and hotelier. He has received various awards and nominations as a chef, and has appeared as a celebrity cook on many television shows. He was previously a general manager and director of food and beverages at Grand Sultan Tea Resort and Golf, having served as one of its executive chefs since 2013.

== Early life ==
Tony Khan was born in Khulna, Bangladesh, on 9 June 1961 to Sarjan Ali Khan, a shipping businessman and filmmaker, and Marium Begum Khan. 2015, he started a culinary institute called The Tony Khan Culinary Institute. He has also served as a judge at many culinary competitions. Since 2015, he serves as an External Verifier for City and Guilds appointed and certified by ILO

== Education ==
He started life in Khulna, where he studied in Khulna Zilla School till 1975 and attended college until 1977 in Shaheed Suhrawardy College in Dhaka, Bangladesh. He went to Singapore to train as an Apprentice Chef and complete his college education from Woodlands Marsiling Secondary School with a major in economics in 1978. In 1992, he majored again in human nutrition from University of Sydney, Australia. In 1998, he attended RMIT University, Melbourne to study Hazard Analysis Critical Control Point (HACCP).

== Career and philosophy ==
He joined Sheraton Ayers Rock Hotel, now known as Voyages Ayers Rock Resort, as sous chef from 1982. He then went on to join a cruise line as Executive Chef and Food and Beverages developer on board the Carnival Cruise Line in Miami, United States from 1994 to 1999. Later, he traveled to Saudi Arabia to join Hyatt Regency. From March 2003 to August 2006, he oversaw and served at ten five-star hotels as an executive chef, providing corporate executive chef services at the Intercontinental Hotels. He returned to Bangladesh in September 2006 and became employed at Radisson Blue Water Garden Hotel as an executive chef and director of food and beverages. In 2009, he became the executive chef and food and beverage manager of The Westin Dhaka, remaining as one until 2012. He is currently employed in Bangladesh at Grand Sultan Tea Resort and Golf, where he is acting General Manager, Director of Food and Beverages and Executive Chef since May 2013. In April 2015, he started his own culinary institute, Tony Khan's Culinary Institute, to teach amateur chefs to become internationally trained in the hotel industry.

== Affiliations and awards ==
Tony Khan played a role in placing intellectually disabled persons to attain full-time restaurant jobs in Nunawading, Australia in 1989. Khan has been a full member of the Australasian Guild Of Professional Cooks since 1986. He is a founding member and President of the Bangladesh Chef's Association. Khan is a member of the Chef's Association of Pakistan as Honorary Vice President. He has been a member of the Industry Skills Council, funded by the International Labor Organization (ILO) and operated by the National Skills Development Council (NSDC), Prime Minister's office, Government of the People Republic of Bangladesh. He has contributed recipes to books as Cancer Society, Eat and Enjoy and Restaurant Secrets. He is a speaker for South Asian Association for Gastronomy (SAAG). According to The Daily Star, Khan was named one of "10 Best Chefs in the World" and in1991 "Chef of The Year" by the South Pacific Tourism Board of Papua New Guinea.

He is founder and president of the Bangladesh Chefs' Association. He has served as a judge at The Malaysian Palm Oil Shera Chef 2011, Curry Chef Awards 2015, Youth Tourism Skills Competition 2015 and Nando's Master Grillers' Challenge 2015.

On 12 March 2020 Tony Khan was presented with a Special Recognition award at the House of Commons in London from Asian Catering Federation chairman Yawar Khan at the launch of the Asian Restaurant Awards and Asian Curry Awards.
