= Chef Abbys =

Ghanaian Culinary Chef and social media personality

- Born: Abena Amoakoaa Sintim-Aboagye; 6 July 1995 (age 31); Kumasi, Ghana
- Citizenship: Ghana
- Education: Kwame Nkrumah University of Science and Technology
- Occupations: Chef, Social Media Influencer, Philanthropist

TikTok information
- Page: Chefabbys
- Years active: 2022–present
- Genre: Food
- Followers: 2.5 million

YouTube information
- Channel: Chefabbys
- Years active: 2022–present
- Genre: Food
- Subscribers: 103 thousand
- Views: 25.5 million
- Last updated: 27 February 2026

Abena Amoakoaa Sintim-Aboagye known as Chef Abbys (born in Kumasi on 6 July 1999) is a Ghanaian chef, culinary creator and philanthropist.

== Early life and education ==
Chef Abbys was born in Kumasi, in the Ashanti Region of Ghana on 6 July 1999. She attended the Wesley Girls' Senior High School for her senior high school education where she studied General arts and completed in 2017. She then proceeded to the Kwame Nkrumah University of Science and Technology where she studied Construction Technology and Management.

== Culinary career ==
Chef Abbys’ culinary career started when she took to video sharing social media application Snapchat to document her cooking process. She later moved her cooking videos to the other social media platforms.

=== Notable mentions ===
In 2025, Chef Abbys served as the official culinary partner for King Charles III's birthday party held at the British High Commissioner's residence in Accra.

She was also invited to join the TikTok Delegation to Cannes Lions' 25 in which she was hosted to a private dining experience with TikTok CEO Shou Zi Chew.

She hosted the Mayor of London Sadiq Khan to a private dining experience during his visit to Ghana.

In July 2025, she was featured in the Time 100 top creators list.

In January 2026, she joined American streamer IShowSpeed on his Ghana stream during his Africa Tour, and introduced him to Ghanaian street snack Kosua Ne Meko which is boiled eggs and pepper.

== Philanthropic works ==
On October 16, 2025, Chef Abbys held the first edition of the Big Street Feast in Accra, Ghana in commemoration of World Food Day. This activity fed over 20,000 people with 3 square meals throughout the day, serving as one of the initiatives under her “Zero Hunger” project. She is set to organise the second edition of the Big street Feast in Accra and Kumasi on 16th October, 2026.

== Awards and nominations ==
Year	Award	Category	Result	Ref.
2024	Creator Awards	Food Creator of the Year	Nominated	
2025	Pulse Influencer Awards	Most Innovative Influencer of the Year, Africa	Won	
2025	Pulse Awards Ghana	Food Influencer of the Year	Won	
2025	Pulse Awards Ghana	TikTok Creator of the Year	Won	
2025	TikTok Awards	Creator of the Year	Won	
2025	TikTok Awards	Food Creator of the Year	Nominated	
2025	Women's Choice Awards Ghana	Young Star of the Year	Won	
2025	Yen Awards	Social Media Star of the Year	Won	
