= Liu Niangzi =

Liu Niangzi (12th-century), was a Chinese court official and imperial chef.

She was the official court chef of the Imperial kitchen of Emperor Gaozong of Song. She is noted as the first woman in this office documented in the imperial staff records.
