= Landi Arbab =

Village in Peshawar District, Pakistan

Landi arbab
- Village not city
- Location in Pakistan
- Coordinates: 33°58′46″N 71°32′41″E
- Country: Pakistan
- District: Peshawar District
- Province: Khyber Pakhtunkhwa
- Elevation: 346 m (1,135 ft)

Population
  - Total: 25,000

Landi Arbab (Pashto: لینډی ارباب) (formerly Sultan Pura: سلطان پورہ) is a village in Peshawar, Pakistan. The village is a 15-minute drive away from Peshawar International Airport and Peshawar Saddar. The village is largely populated by the Arbab, Murad Khel, Malaks, Syed, Ahmad Zai, Fateh Khan Khel, Qasab, Ghorghust and Qazi clans. It is the only village in the area that provides direct routes to Ring Road Peshawar, Peshawar City, Gulberg Peshawar, Peshawar Saddar, Peshawar Cantt, Peshawar International Airport, Kohat Road, Bara Gate, and University Road. The economy is primarily sourced from agriculture and small industries.

The village is known for its cuisine, Chapli Kebab (چپلي کباب), and locally produced microlight planes. Its specialty Chapli-kabab is exported to the Middle East.

== History ==
Landi Arbab is home to a few historical places like the Bachai Lara ("Royal Path"), said to have been traveled by a Mughal Emperor. Another historical place in the village is Ghazi Baba, a Sufi Saint tomb, situated besides Bachai Lara. Ghazi Baba ("Victorious Father") was mortally wounded in a battle in ancient times and was carried away by his horse to Bachai Lara where he died. Formerly, an urs (Sufi saint death anniversary) ceremony was held at his tomb, but the practice is defunct now. During the 1965 Indo-Pakistan War, the village was bombed by an Indian aircraft, and in response the villagers shot the war aircraft with small arms fire, damaging the Mosque of Arbaban in the area of "Bara Atto" near the house of Fazal Rahim Jan, which was also damaged. Many other houses were damaged, thus violating the international rules of war.

The village is famous for hospitality and even accommodated the migrating Afghan Pashtuns during the Soviet-Afghan War in the 1980s.

== Education ==
The literacy rate of the village is 95%. There are a number of primary and secondary schools in the village alongside various religious schools. Some well-known institutions are:

- Danish Model School
- EEF Model School
- Frontier Cadet School
- Govt. Boys High School
- Govt. Boys Primary School
- Govt. College of Technology
- Govt. Girls High School
- Govt. Girls Primary School
- Sarhad Model College
- Sarhad Model School
- The Educators

The village also serves as a center for Pashto literary organizations like Adabi Malgari Pekhawar and Pukhto Adabi Jarga, both founded by the poet Dad Muhammad Dilsoz.

== Health ==
The village consists of a number of medical and homeopathic clinics and dispensaries alongside a Government Services Hospital. Additionally, the village has easy access to all other hospitals in the Peshawar district.

== Transport ==
The village is well connected through other parts of the district via cabs, rickshaws, and historical horse-carts.

== Languages ==
The bona fide residents of the village are primarily Pashtuns, but Urdu and English are also understood by the literate residents.

== Agriculture ==
Wheat, barley, tomatoes, cauliflower, turnip, bottle and bitter gourd, butternut squash, and corns are the main crops cultivated in the village. The village gets its water for irrigation through a canal from the Kabul River.

== Sports ==
Sports played by the local residents include cricket, badminton, volleyball, kite flying, microlight plane flying and Goli-danda. The village hosts several local cricket tournaments occasionally.
