= Zeina Mourtada =

Swedish food influencer (born 1982)

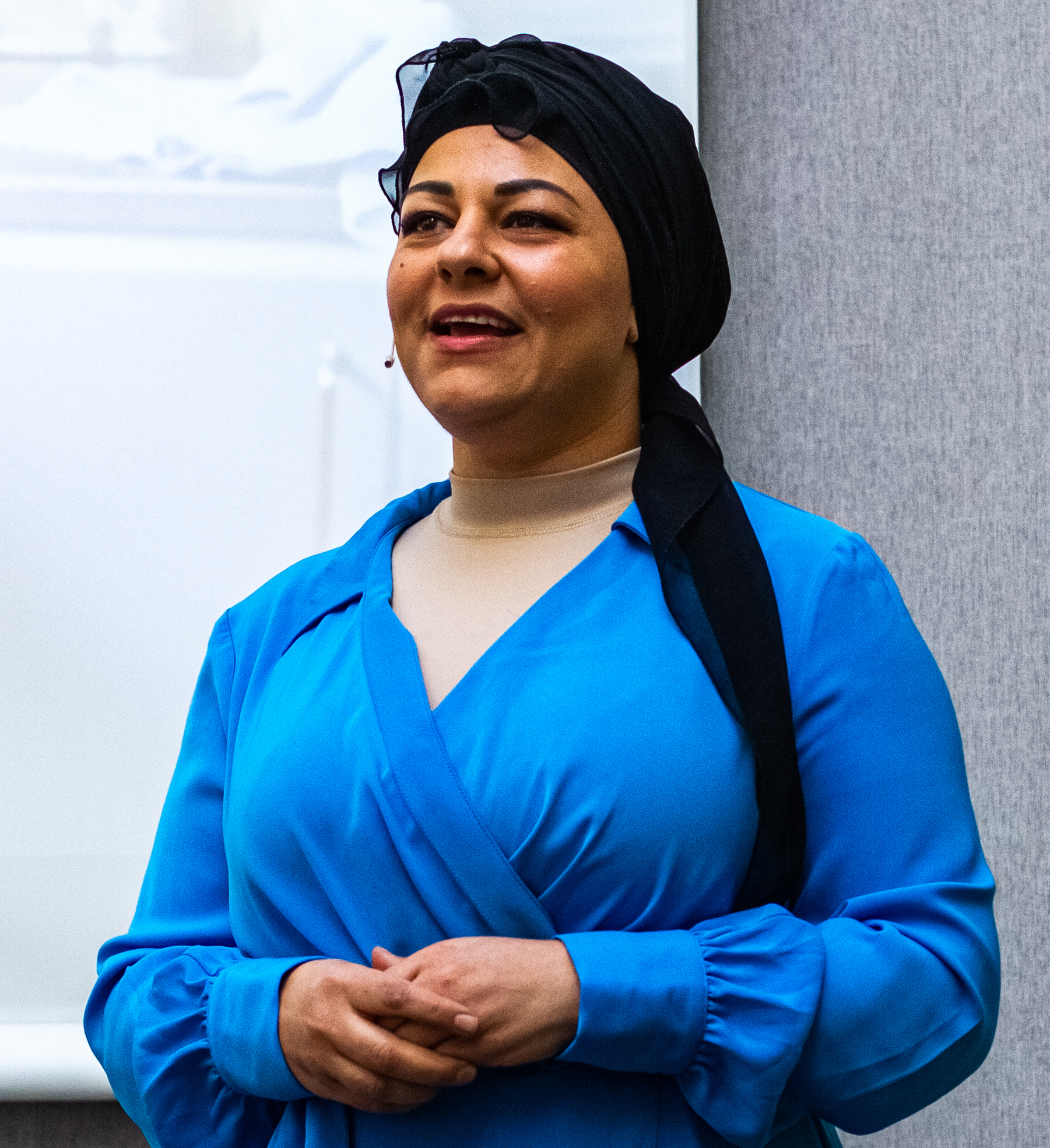
Zeina Mourtada, 2022

Zeina Mourtada is a Swedish chef and food writer and influencer. She was born in 1982 in Sierra Leone, but is of Lebanese ancestry and grew up in Malmö. Starting out with a food blog, she has appeared as a television chef on TV4 and SVT. Her debut cookbook was Zeinas kitchen in 2018, sharing a name with her food blog.

She started her food blog in 2014, and by September 2016 had 23 000 Instagram followers, increasing to 65 400 by December 2017. In 2015 she won an award as "Swedens best food blogger". In 2020 she launched a line of food products, branded as Zeinas. The launch lineup consisted of popular meze dishes such as fresh falafel, muhammara and hummus. In 2023 the company behind the brand, Zeinas AB, had a revenue of 37.4 million Swedish kronor.
