= Titti Qvarnström =

Swedish chef

- Born: 13 November 1979 (age 46); Malmö, Sweden
- Culinary career
- Cooking style: New Nordic cuisine
- Rating: Michelin stars
- Previous restaurant: Bloom in the Park
- Television show: Köksmästarna (Top Chef)

Titti Qvarnström (born 13 November 1979) is a Swedish chef who held a Michelin star at the restaurant Bloom in the Park in Malmö, making Qvarnström the first woman in the Nordic edition of the Michelin Guide to win a star.

== Career ==
Titti Qvarnström was born in Malmö, Sweden, and grew up in the city and around Skåne. As a child, she experienced the range of wild ingredients that the area had to offer. Qvarnström's step father was a biologist, who would take her out on nature expeditions.

She trained as a chef in Copenhagen, Denmark, and went on to work for several restaurants in Berlin, Germany. When she returned to Malmö, she took up the role of executive chef at Bloom in the Park. Initially it was difficult to attract local customers, but this changed after Qvarnström was named the Rising Star of 2010 in the White Guide. In 2015, Bloom in the Park was awarded a Michelin star, making Qvarnström the first woman to win such an accolade in the Nordic edition. She said of the award, "It's absurd that it has taken so long for a woman to get a star, but we are few and even fewer who notice us. It has often happened that people asked me for the chef and could not imagine it's me. Now I do not have to explain myself anymore, this is a quality label on me as a strong brand, and a receipt that what you are doing is good." In the same year, the restaurant was named the best by Restauranggalans.

On television, Qvarnström has appeared on Köksmästarna (Eng: Top Chef). Qvarnström left Bloom in the Park during the autumn of 2017, saying that she wanted to open her own Malmö-based restaurant where she could have complete control.
