= Joseph Scarpone =

American chef based in Philadelphia

Joseph Scarpone is an American chef based in Philadelphia. He was most recently the owner/executive chef of Sovalo in the Northern Liberties neighborhood of Philadelphia. He was the former executive chef under at Napa Valley's Tra Vigne for several years.

== Formal Training ==
His first full-time cooking job was at Frascati, managed by chef John DiPrimo. In November 1995, Scarpone moved west to the Napa Valley to work at the renowned Tra Vigne restaurant under chef Michael Chiarello and was quickly promoted to sous-chef. Scarpone returned to Philadelphia in 1999 to work for Georges Perrier at Brassiere Perrier, but he returned to Tra Vigne as the executive sous-chef and executive chef. In 2005, after a brief turn at Campanile in Los Angeles, Joseph returned to Philadelphia and opened Sovalo in Northern Liberties, which earned three bells from the Philadelphia Inquirer

== Agiato ==
After four years, Scarpone closed Sovalo to open Agiato in the Manayunk neighborhood of Philadelphia. According to a post from the Philadelphia Inquirer's food critic Michael Klein, Agiato is scheduled to open in the fall of 2009. The restaurant is being opened in conjunction with The Belvedere Business Group.
