= JohnPaul Arabome =

Nigerian chef, restaurateur, film producer and recording artist

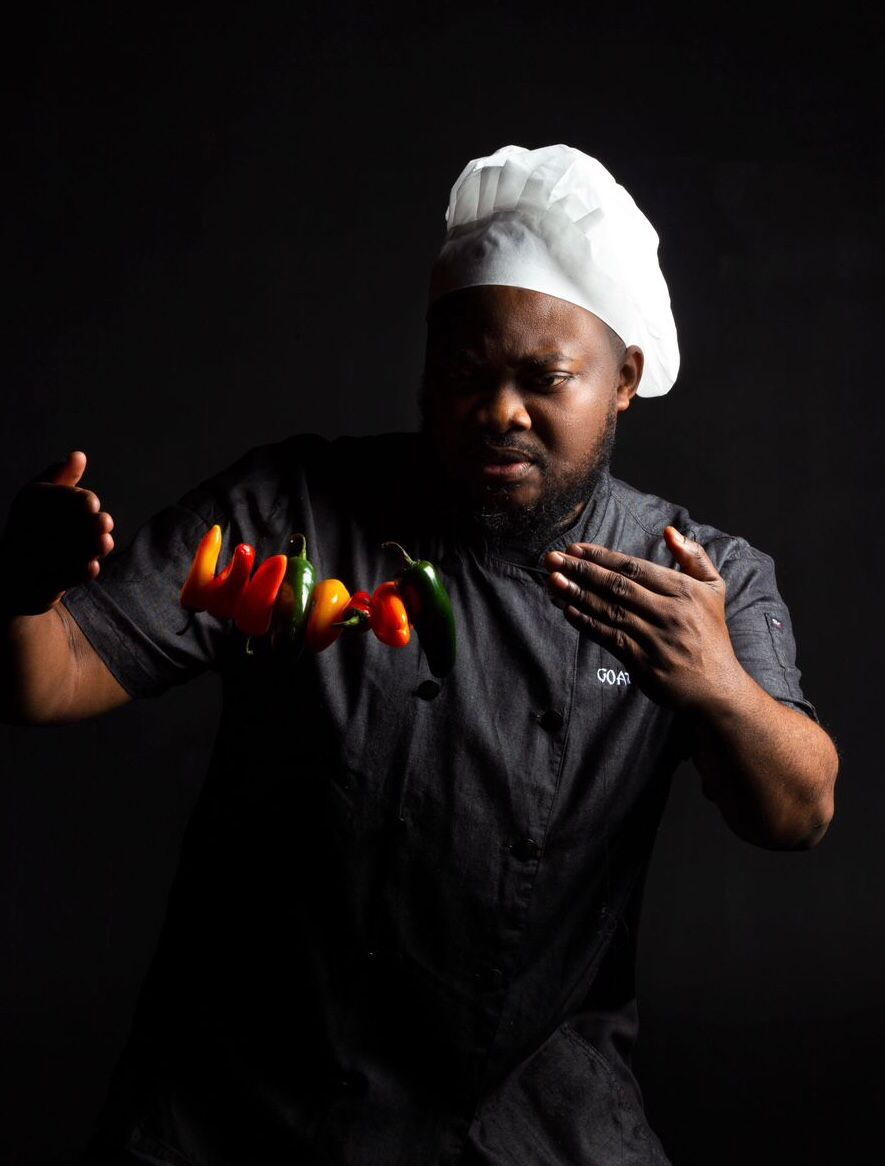
- Born: JohnPaul Arabome; January 11, 1982 (age 44); Uromi, Edo State, Nigeria
- Other names: JP Arabome; PeppDigital; The Goat Daddy
- Education: Saint John's University; California Lutheran University
- Occupations: Chef; restaurateur; film producer; recording artist
- Years active: 2013–present

JohnPaul Arabome (born 11 January 1982), also known professionally as PeppDigital and The Goat Daddy, is a Nigerian-American chef, restaurateur, film producer and recording artist based in the United States. He began his film career in the 2010s before establishing himself in the culinary industry and recording music under the name PeppDigital.

== Early life and education ==
Arabome was born on 11 January 1982 in Uromi, Edo State, Nigeria, the youngest of nine children. He attended Lumen Christi Secondary School in Uromi and was admitted to the University of Benin in 1999, where he initially studied accounting.

He moved to the United States in 2001 and attended Saint John's University in Minnesota, earning a bachelor's degree in economics. He later attended California Lutheran University, where he earned a Master of Business Administration.

== Career ==
=== Business and film ===
Arabome worked as a consultant between 2005 and 2013, including work for Bank of America and Countrywide. He subsequently established a production facility in Chatsworth, Los Angeles, and began working in film production and directing.

His film work includes Bootivity (2013), Touchdown X (2014), which he executive produced, and The Queen's Fiction (2016).

=== Culinary career ===
Arabome entered the restaurant industry through The Peppered Goat, a Nigerian food business established in the Los Angeles area during the COVID-19 pandemic. The business initially operated through pickup and delivery.

His culinary persona, "The Goat Daddy", developed alongside The Peppered Goat brand.

In 2022, Arabome represented Nigeria in a jollof rice cook-off in Los Angeles. He won the competition against participants representing Ghana, Liberia, Senegal and other West African countries.

Arabome later expanded his restaurant work in Los Angeles with Jagabans LA, a Nigerian restaurant where he serves as owner and executive chef.

In 2026, he expanded his culinary portfolio with two additional concepts, Jerk Ati Jollof and Aboki & Co. Jerk Ati Jollof combines Nigerian and Caribbean cuisine, including jollof rice and Jamaican jerk, while Aboki & Co. focuses on smoked foods and suya. The concepts were developed with an emphasis on smaller-scale operations, including delivery and corporate catering.

=== Music career ===
Arabome records and performs under the name PeppDigital. He became involved in music production after moving to Minnesota, where he began making music with Caribbean musicians and friends.

He released his debut studio album, Ma Ol Shiii Vol. 1, in 2021. In 2023 he released The GDP, an abbreviation of The Goat Daddy Project. The seven-track project was followed in April 2024 by the six-track EP Goat Daddy.

The Goat Daddy EP was produced by Steverawd and Craze and was primarily recorded in the United States, with mixing completed in Nigeria.

In an interview with The Punch, Arabome said that music helped him cope with racism and separation from Nigerian culture after immigrating to the United States.

On 16 October 2024, PeppDigital released the eight-track studio album 1:11 through Ooosum Music.

The album contains eight tracks, including "Jezebel", "Bidi Bangin'", "Peperempe", "Chocomilo", "GoodTime", "Assumptions", "No Go Kill Person" and "Get Down Low".

In September 2026, PeppDigital released two albums on the same day, Piano Has No Borders and A Beautiful Distraction. The projects explored a range of musical styles, including amapiano, country, rock, reggae and gospel.

Piano Has No Borders was influenced by South African music and began as an exploration of amapiano before expanding into experiments combining piano-based music with other genres. A Beautiful Distraction was described as a more personal and reflective project, with songs addressing relationships, faith, regret and other personal and social themes.

Both projects incorporated artificial intelligence as part of the music-production process. Arabome has described PeppDigital as the creative identity behind the work, with his role including developing concepts, writing and shaping songs, determining structure and musical direction, editing stems and using technology during production. He has argued that the use of AI in music should be considered in relation to the degree of human creative involvement rather than the use of the technology alone.

Arabome has described his culinary and music careers as connected aspects of his creative work, with music providing an additional medium for addressing cultural and social subjects.

== Discography ==
=== Studio albums ===
- Ma Ol Shiii Vol. 1 (2021)
- The GDP (2023)
- 1:11 (2024)
- Piano Has No Borders (2026)
- A Beautiful Distraction (2026)

=== Extended plays ===
- Goat Daddy (2024)

=== Selected singles ===
- "A Beautiful Day" featuring Kashimana Ahua
- "Siddon Pon It"
- "Girl From Ghana"
- "GoodTime" featuring Famos Fame (2024)
- "Live Without You" featuring Vicky, Tumbo and A.T. Chill (2024)
