= Erez Komarovsky =

Israeli chef

- ארז קומרובסקי
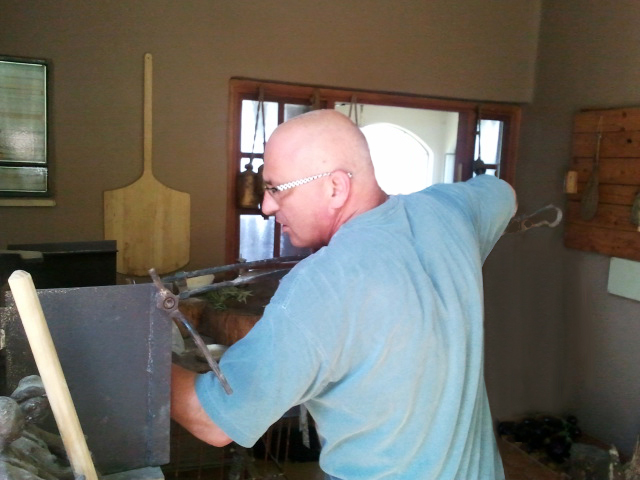
- Komarovsky baking focaccia in a tabun oven, 2012
- Born: 1962 (age 63–64); Tel Aviv
- Occupations: Chef, baker, educator, author
- Years active: 1983—present
- Known for: First artisanal bread-baker in Israel
- Partner: Professor Mickey Gluzman
- Website: erez-komarovsky.co.il/pages/english/

Erez Komarovsky (Hebrew: ארז קומרובסקי; born 1962) is an Israeli chef, baker, educator, and author. In the 1990s he founded the Lehem Erez (Erez's Bread) bakery and café chain, and he is considered the initiator of artisanal bread-making in Israel. Since 2007 he has led a cooking school in his home in Mitzpe Mattat in the Upper Galilee. He has authored several cookbooks.

== Biography ==
Erez Komarovsky was born in Tel Aviv to Menachem and Ruth Komarovsky. He has one older brother and two sisters. He credits his early exposure to ethnic cuisine to his visits to his father's almond orchards in southern Israel in his youth; he would visit with the Druze families who harvested the almonds and sample their foods. At the age of 11 he moved with his family to Ramat Gan, and attended a high school outside Yehud. He served in the 1982 Lebanon War during his compulsory military service. Komarovsky informed his parents he was gay when he was 18. He met his current partner, Professor Mickey Gluzman, in 1986. They live in Mattat.

== Cooking career ==
After the army, in 1983, he began working as a chef in Jaffa. He went to Paris to earn a graduate diploma in classical French cuisine at Le Cordon Bleu, and worked in restaurants and bakeries in that city before returning to Tel Aviv in 1985 to open his own catering business, Erez's Cooking Studio. For five years he also wrote a cooking column for the Tel Aviv weekly newspaper Ha'ir (The City). One of his catering clients invited him to Japan to take a course in kaiseki cuisine, and from there he traveled to San Francisco, California, in 1989.

In California he discovered Japanese, Italian, and Mexican cuisine, organic food, and boutique bakeries. He worked as a stylist on a dessert cookbook by Wolfgang Puck and assisted Hugh Carpenter in Northern California with his fusion cookbook. He returned to Israel in 1994 realizing that, "despite all my training, I am above all an Israeli chef—that couscous, olive oil, and goat cheese are the ingredients closest to my heart".

Back in Israel, Komarovsky decided to enter the bread-making business and introduce San Francisco sourdough to his native country. He returned to Paris to study under Lionel Poilâne and then returned to California to intern in the Acme Bread Company and Metropolis Bakery in Berkeley. In 1996 he and his business partner, Ilan Rom, founded the Lehem Erez (Hebrew: לחם ארז, Erez's Bread) bakery in Herzliya. The bakery is "widely considered the starting point of a bread revolution in Israel", as up to that time commercial bakeries sold traditional rather than gourmet breads. Less than a year after opening the bakery, Komarovsky opened an adjoining restaurant serving "light, seasonal food" influenced by ethnic cuisines.

By 2008 the Lehem Erez chain had grown to more than 30 bakeries, many with adjoining cafés. Bakery selections included "about fifteen types of whole-grain and organic handcrafted breads, with seasonal offerings that might include fresh garlic in the spring, fig and Roquefort in the summer, and Jerusalem artichoke in the winter". Cakes, cookies, and boutique olives, cheeses, and Israeli wines were also sold in the bakery shops. In 2010 Komarovsky sold his share in Lehem Erez, continuing as an independent consultant to the chain.

== Cooking school ==
In 2007 Komarovsky opened a cooking school in his home in Mitzpe Mattat in the Upper Galilee. His half-day workshop covers subjects such as bread-making and seafood preparation, and concludes with a "multicourse meal, paired with wine" in his dining room. Komarovsky planted an extensive organic garden of herbs and vegetables on his property, including "dozens of types of sage, exotic herbs, tomatoes from Sicily and Uzbekistan, Indian purple beans, Thai beans, apples and pears … and bay leaves growing on a tree", and installed a tabun (clay oven for bread-baking).

== Cooking style ==
Komarovsky's dishes emphasize seasonal ingredients; organic herbs, vegetables, seeds, and fruits; and the meat and cheeses of locally raised lamb and goat. His recipes incorporate a limited number of ingredients and spices, but are known for their intense flavor. Komarovsky draws his inspiration from Ashkenazi, Sephardi, Palestinian, Syrian, Lebanese, and Druze cuisine.

== Views and opinions ==
Komarovsky espouses secular, leftist views. In the 1980s, as a columnist for the Tel Aviv newspaper Ha'ir, he published a recipe for suckling pig on Yom Kippur. During the Second Intifada, he traveled to Nazareth to conduct a weeklong series of collaborative dinners with Arab chef Duhoul Sfadi of the Diana Restaurant, followed by a second week of collaborative dinners at his restaurant in Herzliya. He lobbied to cancel the government ban on bread sales during the Passover holiday. He was also a member of a group that successfully lobbied the government to ban the force-feeding of geese for the making of foie gras.

== See also ==
- Israeli cuisine

== Bibliography ==
- אפייה מהירה עם ארז קומרובסקי [Quick Bake with Erez Komarovsky] (in Hebrew). Keter. 2016. ISBN 978-965-07-2483-2.
- ספר האפייה של ארז קומרובסקי [The Baking Book of Erez Komarovsky] (in Hebrew). Keter. 2013. ISBN 978-965-072164-0.
- ארז קומרובסקי מבשל ואופה [Erez Komarovsky Cooks and Bakes] (in Hebrew). Keter. 2011. ISBN 978-965-07-1902-9.
- שנה בצלחת: סתיו חורף אביב קיץ [Yearly Dishes: Autumn, Winter, Spring, Summer] (in Hebrew). Am Oved. 2008. ISBN 9789651320606. (with Erez Ben-Shachar)
- השף הקטן – אגדה של מטבח [The Little Chef: A kitchen story] (in Hebrew).
- Komarovsky, Erez (2001). Fresh and Simple: Contemporary Israeli Cuisine (in Hebrew). ISBN 978-9659035502.
