= Wang Gang (chef) =

Chinese chef and Internet personality (born 1989)

- 王刚
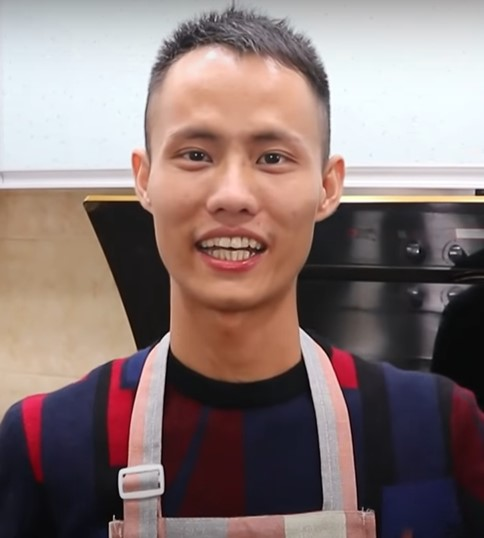
- Wang Gang in 2018
- Born: June 11, 1989 (age 37); Fushun County, Zigong, Sichuan, China
- Other name: Wang Gang the Gourmet Writer (美食作家王刚)
- Occupations: Chef; food blogger; Internet personality
- Spouse: Yao Shufen (姚树芬)

Bilibili information
- Channel: 美食作家王刚R
- Years active: 2018–present
- Followers: 6.83 million

YouTube information
- Channel: Chef Wang 美食作家王刚
- Years active: 2018–present
- Subscribers: 2.15 million
- Views: 615 million
- Last updated: 2 March 2026
- Website: Wang Gang's Weibo

Wang Gang (Chinese: 王刚; pinyin: Wáng Gāng; born 11 June 1989) is a Chinese chef and Internet personality. He was born in Fushun County, Zigong, Sichuan, and decided to pursue a culinary career at age 15. He has 5 million followers across Xigua Video, bilibili, Weibo, and YouTube as of 2018, and has been praised for his simple, levelheaded approach to cooking. He specialises in Sichuan cuisine.

== Videos ==
Most of Wang Gang's videos are cookery demonstrations. As a Sichuanese, most of his recipes are authentic Sichuan cuisine. He also teaches Cantonese cuisines he learned as an apprentice in Guangdong. His videos are often straightforward, in a no-nonsense and easy-to-understand manner without any special effects or background music. At the beginning of the videos, he introduces the name of the dish with materials in his hand, then moves straight on to the demonstration, where he processes the ingredients, cooks them in a wok and serves the dish. At the end of the videos, he often provides a "technical summary" for the specific dishes. In contrast to his typically serious attitude towards cooking, he is also famous for his many light-hearted catchphrases, such as "Take it to your enthusiastic butchers", "first, heat up the wok", "add in 'broad' oil" (宽油, kuanyou, meaning 'an ample amount of oil'). These catchphrases have often become internet memes.

Wang started to upload vlogs on his life since August 2018. His first vlog contents include teaching his American friend Jerry Kowal how to cook Sichuanese dishes, introducing how to choose woks and kitchen knives, et cetera. In mid-2019, Wang Gang started recording and uploading cookery videos based in his uncle's house in the countryside, featuring his butcher uncle, Wang Baixiu. His uncle is often referred to as "The Beast (火云邪神)" by the fans, owing to his striking resemblance of the homonymous antagonist from movie Kung Fu Hustle — something pointed out by Uncle Roger when he reviewed a video of Wang making egg-fried rice. At the end of his 'countryside' videos, Wang typically invites his uncle/aunt to taste the dishes.

In March 2019, Wang attracted controversy for slaughtering and preparing a meal from the endangered giant salamander. He later clarified that the salamander he used was farmed and thus legal to consume.

On 24 August 2020, Wang set up his sub-channel dedicated for restaurant explorations.

In October 2020, Wang posted an egg fried rice recipe and was widely denounced by Chinese officials. The timing of the video was seen as a reference to Mao Anying, the son of Mao Zedong who died in the Korean War allegedly because he alerted American bombers to his position when he was cooking fried rice, as the smoke from his cooking attracted the attention of the Americans. Wang was accused of using the video post as a "malicious political innuendo" insulting Mao's legacy. Wang was forced to issue an apology.

On 27 November 2023, two days after the death anniversary of Anying, a video of Wang preparing the dish was posted on Weibo. The video was subsequently taken down and Wang, in an apology video, said his team uploaded the video without his knowledge. He also declared he would not prepare any egg fried rice nor post any videos about it. Chef Wang started uploading videos again on February 27, 2024.
