= Simon Bonwick =

British Michelin chef

Simon Bonwick (born December 1969) is a British Michelin chef. He was born in Croydon, London and lived on the wash of the Lincolnshire and Norfolk borders for a short time. He did his initial training at Boston College, Lincolnshire. The Bonwick family owned The Crown, Burchetts Green until December 2021, which had one Michelin Star. Bonwick ran his kitchen at the Crown alone. Bonwick opened the Crown in October 2013 and has gone on to achieve a rating of six in the Good Food Guide and The Good Food Guide's Best Pub Restaurant award 2018, and a spot in the Top 100 UK restaurant awards. Simon Bonwick has written Cooking in Pubs (2021).
