= List of cooking shows =

The following is a list of cooking shows.

== 0-9 ==
- 30 Minute Meals - educational (U.S.)

== A ==
- Alive and Cooking - educational (AU)
- America's Test Kitchen - educational (U.S.)

== B ==
- Baking with Julia - educational (U.S.)
- Barbecue America - educational (U.S.)
- Barefoot Contessa - educational (U.S.)
- Beat Bobby Flay - competition (U.S.)
- Best Recipes Ever - educational (CA)
- The Best Thing I Ever Ate - educational (U.S.)
- Big Daddy's House - educational (U.S.)
- Binging with Babish - educational (U.S.)

== C ==
- Cake Wars - competition (U.S.)
- Can't Cook, Won't Cook - competition
- Celebrity Cooking Showdown - competition
- Chef at Home
- Chef Boy Logro: Kusina Master - educational
- Chef's Story - talk show
- Chef's Table - TV series
- Chefs A' Field - talk show
- The Chew - talk show
- Chinese Food Made Easy
- Chocolate with Jacques Torres
- Chopped
- Chopped: Canada
- Chopped Junior
- Cocineros argentinos
- Come Dine with Me
- Con las manos en la masa
- ...Cooks!
- Cook Yourself Thin
- Cook's Country from America's Test Kitchen - educational
- Cookin' Cheap
- Cooking for Dads - educational
- Cooking Live
- Cooking with Dog - educational
- Cooking with Master Chefs: Hosted by Julia Child - educational
- Cooks vs. Cons
- Cottage Country: Chef Ted Reader
- Culinary Class Wars (South Korea)
- Cupcake Wars
- Cutthroat Kitchen

== D ==
- Daisy Cooks!
- Dinner and a Movie
- Dinner: Impossible
- Dione Lucas' Gourmet Club
- Domestic Goddess
- Down Home with the Neelys

== E ==
- East Meets West
- El gran premio de la cocina
- Emeril Green
- Emeril Live
- Epic Meal Time
- Essence of Emeril
- Essential Pépin
- Everyday Italian

== F ==
- The F Word (UK)
- The F Word (US)
- Final Table – TV series
- The Final Table
- Food and Drink
- Food Poker
- The French Chef
- Fresh with the Australian Women's Weekly
- The Frugal Gourmet

== G ==
- The Galloping Gourmet
- Get Stuffed
- Giada at Home
- Glutton for Punishment
- Good Chef Bad Chef
- Good Eats
- Gordon Ramsay: Cookalong Live (UK)
- Gordon Ramsay's 24 Hours to Hell & Back
- Gordon Ramsay's Home Cooking (UK)
- Gordon Ramsay's Ultimate Cookery Course (UK)
- Gordon's Great Escape
- The Gourmet Next Door
- The Great American Recipe - competition
- The Great British Bake Off - competition
- Great British Menu
- Great Chefs
- Great Food Live
- Greatest Dishes in the World
- Guy's Big Bite
- Guy's Grocery Games

== H ==
- The Hairy Bikers' Cookbook
- The Hairy Bikers' Food Tour of Britain
- Have Fork, Will Travel
- Hell's Kitchen
- Hippy Gourmet
- Holiday Baking Championship
- How to Boil Water

== I ==
- In the Kitchen with Stefano Faita
- Inside Dish
- Iron Chef (Japan)
- Iron Chef America
- Iron Chef Australia
- Iron Chef Canada
- Iron Chef Gauntlet
- Iron Chef Showdown
- Iron Chef UK
- Iron Chef USA
- Iron Chef Vietnam

== J ==
- Jacques Pépin: Fast Food My Way - educational
- Jacques Pépin: Heart and Soul - educational
- Jamie at Home
- Joanne Weir's Cooking Class - educational
- Joyce Chen Cooks
- Julia & Jacques Cooking at Home - educational
- Junior MasterChef

== K ==
- King of Culinary (also called 三把刀 ("San Ba Dao"), Raja Kulinari and ராஜா கைய வச்சா ("Raja Kaiya Vecha"))
- The Kitchen
- Kitchen Criminals
- Kitchen Nightmares
- Kitchen Superstar
- Kitchen Millionaire
- Khana Khazana by Sanjeev Kapoor

== L ==
- Lidia's Kitchen
- Local Food Hero
- Louisiana Cookin'

== M ==
- Martha
- MasterChef (UK)
- MasterChef (US)
- MasterChef Australia
- MasterChef Canada
- MasterChef Junior
- MasterChef India
- MasterChef USA
- Mexico: One Plate at a Time
- My Kitchen Rules (Australia)
- My Kitchen Rules (NZ)
- My Kitchen Rules (US)
- My Kitchen Rules (SA)
- My Kitchen Rules (UK)
- Mary's Kitchen Crush (CA)

== N ==
- Nadia G's Bitchin' Kitchen
- The Naked Chef
- The Naughty Kitchen with Chef Blythe Beck
- New Southern Cooking
- New Scandinavian Cooking
- The Next Iron Chef
- Nigella Bites
- Nigella Express
- No Kitchen Required

== O ==
- Oliver's Twist

== P ==
- Party Line with The Hearty Boys
- Paula's Best Dishes
- Paula's Home Cooking
- Post Punk Kitchen

== Q ==
- Quick Fix Meals with Robin Miller
- Quickfire: The 10-minute Kitchen Wonders

== R ==
- Rachael Ray
- Rachael vs. Guy: Celebrity Cook-Off
- Rachael Ray's Kids Cook-Off
- Rachael Ray's Tasty Travels
- Ramsay's Kitchen Nightmares
- Rasoi Show
- Ready Set Cook
- Ready Steady Cook
- Ricardo and Friends
- Rock Dinner

== S ==
- Sarap Diva
- Saturday Kitchen
- Selena + Chef
- Simply Ming
- Sorted Food
- Sugar Rush
- Sunday Feast
- The Surreal Gourmet
- Sweet Genius

== T ==
- Taste, hosted by David Rosengarten
- Taste in Translation
- Ten Dollar Dinners
- Throwdown! with Bobby Flay
- Top Chef
- Top Chef Masters
- Turn Up the Heat with G. Garvin
- Two Fat Ladies
- The Place To Eat

== U ==
- Unwrapped
- The Urban Peasant

== W ==
- We Can Cook Too! (cooking with Broadway stars, streaming on The STAGE Network)
- What Would Brian Boitano Make?
- What's Cooking?
- Wok with Yan
- Woman's World
- World Class Cuisine
- Worst Cooks in America

== Y ==
- Yan Can Cook
