= 2007 Holiday Bowl =

2007 Pacific Life Holiday Bowl
- Holiday Bowl logo
Arizona State Sun Devils	Texas Longhorns
(10–2)	(9–3)
Pac-10	Big 12
34	52
Head coach: Dennis Erickson	Head coach: Mack Brown
AP / Coaches / BCS; 12 / 11 / 11	AP / Coaches / BCS; 17 / 17 / 19
	1	2	3	4	Total
Arizona State	0	10	10	14	34
Texas	21	7	7	17	52
- Date: December 27, 2007
- Season: 2007
- Stadium: Qualcomm Stadium
- Location: San Diego
- MVP: Offensive: QB Colt McCoy, Texas; Defensive: DE Brian Orakpo, Texas
- Favorite: Texas by 1½
- Referee: Penn Wagers (SEC)
- Halftime show: Various high school marching bands and both colleges' marching bands
- Attendance: 64,020
- Payout: US$2,250,000 per team

United States TV coverage
- Network: ESPN
- Announcers: Brent Musburger, Kirk Herbstreit, and Lisa Salters

The 2007 Pacific Life Holiday Bowl was a college football bowl game played on December 27, 2007, in San Diego, California. It was part of the 2007 NCAA Division I FBS football season and 1 of 32 games in the 2007–08 bowl season. It featured the Texas Longhorns from the Big 12 against the Pac-10 co-champion Arizona State Sun Devils. Texas won, 52–34, and set Holiday Bowl records for the earliest score and for most points scored in the first quarter. Texas also set a school record for most points scored in a bowl game. A bizarre play involving Chris Jessee, (Note: Sources have spelled the last name as Jessee, Jessie, and Jesse. For consistency, the spelling of Jessee is used in this article.) a member of the Longhorn football operations staff and the stepson of the Texas head coach, has been cited as one of the strangest plays of the season.

== Bowl background ==
The Holiday Bowl is a post-season NCAA-sanctioned Division I FBS college football bowl game that has been played annually at Qualcomm Stadium in San Diego, since 1978. The game is currently sponsored by Pacific Life Insurance, so it is known as the "Pacific Life Holiday Bowl"; previous title sponsors have been SeaWorld, Thrifty Car Rental, Plymouth, and Culligan. Bowl games typically have contracts with specific colleges to provide eligible teams. The conferences affiliated with the Holiday Bowl has changed over the history of the bowl. As of 2007, the game features the 2nd place Pac-10 team and the 3rd place Big 12 team.

In 2004, one-loss California was blown out in an upset by the Big 12's Texas Tech, 45–31. Sonny Cumbie, Tech's quarterback, had one of the most memorable performances in Holiday Bowl history. In 2005, an Oregon team playing without its star quarterback (10–1) lost to a battered Oklahoma team, 17–14, solidifying many people's opinions that Oregon was unworthy of a BCS bid. Oklahoma's victory in 2005 was vacated as penalty for having two ineligible players on the team. As a result, there is officially no winner to that game. In the 2006 Holiday Bowl, the California Golden Bears defeated the Texas A&M Aggies 45–10.

One of the more popular (yet unusual) events associated with the Holiday Bowl is the Wiener Nationals, the national championships for the U.S. dachshund racing circuit.

== Pre-game notes ==
=== Team selection ===
Before the official bowl invitations were made, executive director Bruce Binkowski speculated that the matchup would be Texas vs. USC, which would have been a rematch of the classic 2006 Rose Bowl.

With Texas' loss to Texas A&M the Longhorns fell out of contention for a BCS bowl; their bowl situation would be decided largely by the play of other Big 12 teams. Number four Missouri beat number two Kansas to win the Big 12 North Division. Missouri rose to the top spot in the BCS rankings prior to facing Oklahoma in the Big 12 Championship game. Oklahoma won the game to become the Big 12 Conference champion and secure their berth in the 2008 Fiesta Bowl. Even though Missouri defeated Kansas, won their division, and outranked Kansas in the BCS standings (number 6 compared to number 8 the Orange Bowl selected Kansas instead of Missouri to play in the 2008 Orange Bowl. BCS rules do not provide for all the highest ranked teams to be automatically included in BCS games; considerable discretion is given to the individual bowls in choosing among eligible teams. The Tigers were invited to play in the 2008 Cotton Bowl Classic; the Cotton Bowl Classic having first pick of Big 12 teams after the BCS bowls have made their selections. The Holiday Bowl had the next selection and they chose Texas.

Arizona State University was ranked number 11 in the BCS standings and they were eligible for a BCS bowl themselves, but like Missouri, ASU was left out of the BCS selections. They were the two highest ranked teams not selected for BCS bowls. This was primarily because the Rose Bowl selection committee chose to arrange a Pac10/Big10 matchup by pitting the lower ranked Illinois against Pac-10 representative USC. Another factor was BCS Buster Hawaii being ranked 10th; the rules specify that a non-BCS team is automatically selected if they are ranked 10th or higher and if an at-large bid is available. The Holiday Bowl selected the Sun Devils to face the Longhorns to set up the first meeting in the history of the two programs.

=== Texas ===
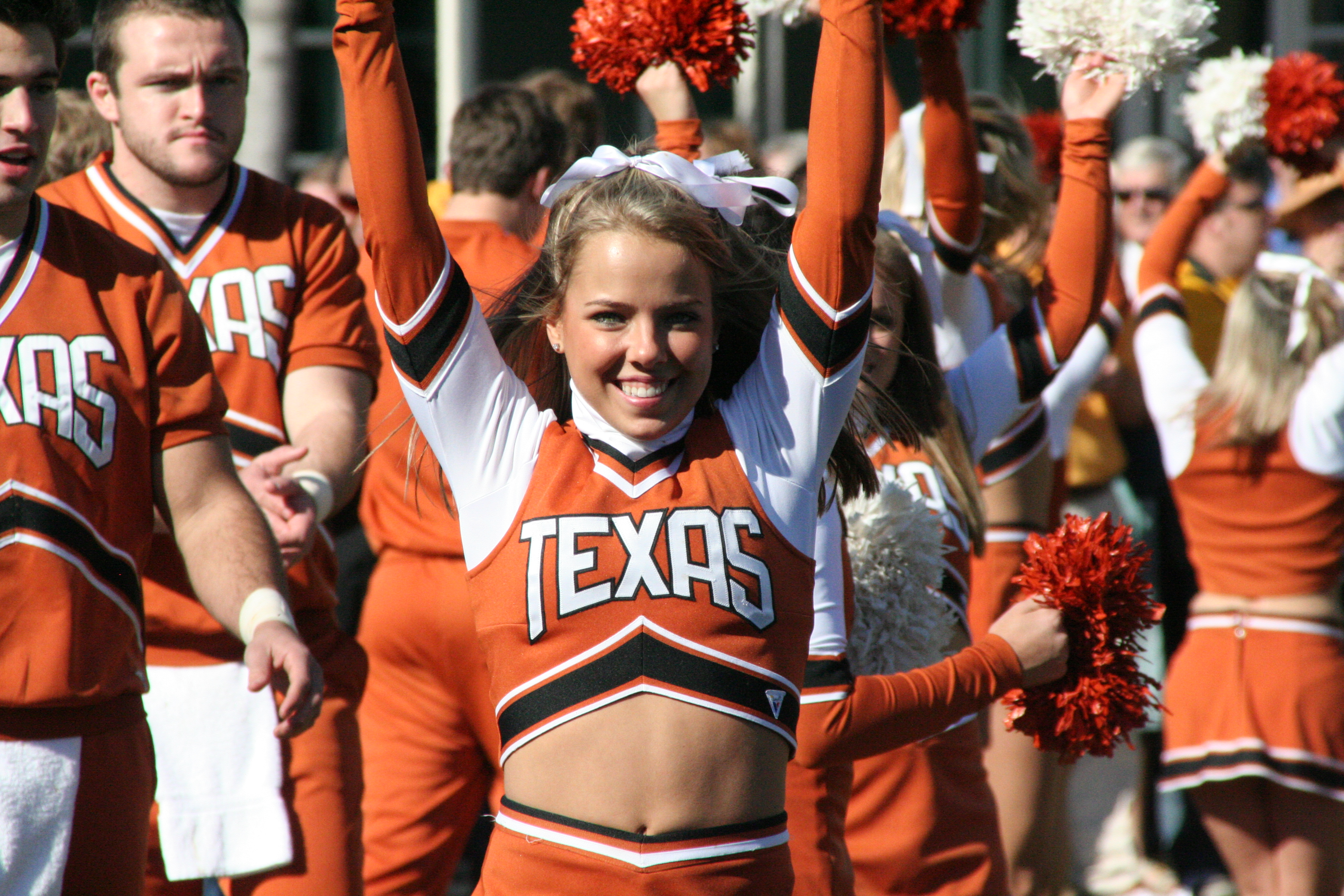
UT cheerleaders perform at the Battle of the Bands, one of the events leading up to the 2007 Holiday Bowl.

The bowl was the 10th straight bowl invitation for Texas, setting a new school record by beating the previous streak of nine straight bowl games from 1977 to 1985. The Horns entered the game with a 6–3 bowl record under head coach Mack Brown, including victories in five of their last six bowl games and three consecutive bowl wins for the first time in school history. Texas beat Michigan 38–37 on a last-second field goal in the 2005 Rose Bowl and defeated USC 41–38 in the final minute of the 2006 Rose Bowl. They beat Iowa 26–24 in the 2006 Alamo Bowl. It was the Texas’ 47th bowl appearance, which ranks second all-time in NCAA history behind Alabama's 54 appearances. That made Texas one of only four schools nationally to win three bowl games in a row. Including six seasons at North Carolina, Brown had directed his teams to 16 straight bowl games – the second-longest active streak in the nation.

The game was UT's fourth appearance in the Holiday Bowl. Except for BYU with eleven appearances, Texas has played in the Holiday Bowl more times than any other team. All three previous UT appearances were close contests, decided by a total of 17 points. UT defeated Washington, 47–43, in 2001, and fell to Oregon, 35–30, in 2000 and Washington State, 28–20, in 2003. In the 2001 game, quarterback Major Applewhite led Texas to set a Holiday Bowl record by overcoming a 19-point second-half deficit to win the game. UT scored 27 fourth-quarter points to secure the win. Brown said, "As a team, our focus will be on getting that 10th win and keeping our bowl winning streak alive. We've got a lot of work to do and the Holiday Bowl always seems to be a wild game with lots of sudden changes so we're looking forward to getting back on the practice field and preparing to play."

The game was the sixth time in the eight consecutive seasons that the Longhorns had played in either this game or in the Rose Bowl; both are held in southern California. This led Long Beach Press-Telegram columnist Bob Keisser to joke that the team would be renamed "the University of Texas-La Jolla." Entering the game, the Longhorns were averaging 462.0 yards of total offense (13th in the NCAA), 199.8 rushing yards (25th in the NCAA), 262.2 passing yards (36th in the NCAA) and 36.0 points per game (19th NCAA). Defensively, Texas was allowing 24.6 points, 374.8 total yards, 99.3 rushing yards per game (10th in the NCAA).

Because of the loss to Texas A&M, Mack Brown put the Longhorns through a boot camp in preparation for the bowl. Practices began at 6:00 am, starting positions were declared open to the best player, and players who made mistakes were forced to take ownership of those mistakes in front of the team.

=== Arizona State ===
ASU completed a 10–2 regular season and won a share of the Pac-10 Conference Championship. Their won–loss record tied that of the USC Trojans, but the Trojans won the tie-breaker by virtue of winning their game against ASU. The Trojans went to the 2008 Rose Bowl as conference champion and the Holiday Bowl selected ASU. The Sun Devils finished the regular season ranked number 11 in the final BCS rankings, number 11 in Coaches poll and number 12 in the AP rankings while Texas was number 19 in the BCS and number 17 in both the coaches and AP rankings.

When the Holiday Bowl chose ASU, the Sun Devils head Coach Dennis Erickson said, "We're excited about going to the Holiday Bowl. We get to play Texas. That's a great program, a historic program, and great opportunity for us. As I said last night after the game, we have no control over the BCS; all we can do is go out there and play football. Which we did a good job of 10 times. That's something that they have to deal with and they dealt with it and they did the best they can do with they system. This is just how it is. Our players are really excited about going where we're going." Vice President for ASU Athletics Lisa Love said. "Playing a perennial power like the University of Texas, December 27 in the Holiday Bowl, which, by the way, is wonderfully hosted by that committee. This is a great, step forward. This is exactly what we wanted to do. We are very pleased to be mentioned in the same breath as a program like Texas."

The Sun Devils were competing in a bowl game for the fourth-year in a row and were appearing in the Holiday Bowl for the third time in program history. The Sun Devils lost to Arkansas, 18–17 in 1985 and to Kansas State, 34–27 in 2002. The Sun Devils held a 12–9–1 all-time bowl record. Their most recent appearance was a 42 21 loss to Hawaii in the Sheraton Hawaii Bowl at the end of the 2006 season.

== Game summary ==
One week prior to the game, Las Vegas casinos favored Texas by 2 points. Rivals.com favored Texas by 1½ points. The game was played Thursday, December 27, 2007, at 7:00 pm Central in San Diego's 70,561-seat Qualcomm Stadium and the official attendance was 64,020. ESPN provided both national television and national radio coverage of the game. The temperature was 53 °F (12 °C) at kick-off but dipped into the 40s before the first half ended.

=== First quarter ===
Texas dominated the first quarter and set two Holiday Bowl records. The Longhorns' first score, on a two-yard touchdown pass from quarterback Colt McCoy to Derek Lokey, was the quickest in game history at 13:39 remaining in the quarter. Lokey is best known as the Longhorns starting nose tackle but he is also used as an offensive end in short-yardage situations. He had lined up at full-back for the play. At the Holiday Bowl luncheon the day before, Lokey had joked that there was not a play in the Longhorn playbook that would result in him being deliberately given the ball. The Longhorns scored 21 first quarter points – two more than SMU scored against BYU in 1980 in the old Holiday Bowl record.

After Texas took the early seven point lead, the teams traded punts. On the first play of ASU's second possession, UT's Brandon Foster forced and recovered a fumble to bring about UT's third offensive series. Brown put in back-up quarterback John Chiles, who is considered a greater running threat than McCoy. Chiles lined up in the zone read offense and handed off to Jamaal Charles, who ran 48 yard to the ASU 4-yard line. On the next play, Chiles ran the ball in for UT's second touchdown.

The next ASU drive ended when Brandon Foster intercepted a pass at the Texas 11-yard line. The teams traded punts and UT began a new drive on their 30-yard line with 1:40 remaining in the half. McCoy threw a 55-yard pass to Quan Cosby and on the next play Jamaal Charles ran in 15 yards for the touchdown. Texas’ three touchdown-scoring drives were accomplished using only 2:04 of game clock. The UT defense forced two turnovers and held the Sun Devils scoreless for the period.

=== Second quarter ===
In the second quarter, ASU's Rudy Carpenter led the Sun Devils to a first down at the Texas 14-yard line. They lost one yard on first down and an incomplete pass set up third and eleven. Carpenter attempted another pass but threw the ball hurriedly in an effort to avoid a sack by Texas linebacker Roddrick Muckelroy. The ball hit the ground and the officials initially threw a flag for intentional grounding; it would later be ruled a backwards pass which becomes a fumble once it hits the ground. The ball continued to bounce towards the Texas sideline with players from both teams in pursuit. The most bizarre event of the game occurred as the ball came close to the sideline.

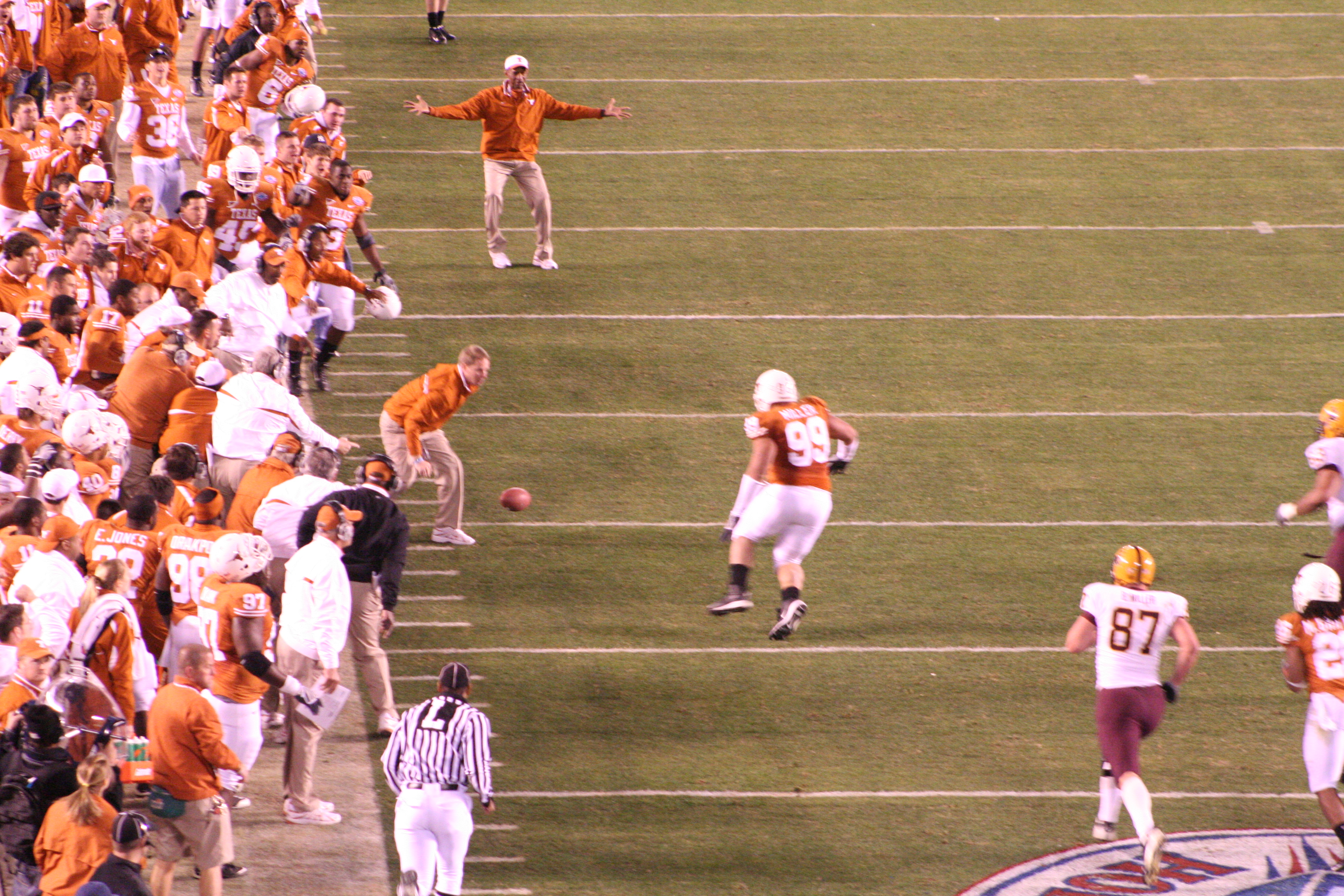
The controversial play where Chris Jessee and other Texas personnel were on the field.

Chris Jessee, a member of the Longhorns football operations staff and Mack Brown's stepson, stepped onto the field and bent down as if to pick up the bouncing ball. Jessee thought that the ball was an incomplete forward pass and he was making the signal for intentional grounding as he stepped forward. The ball came close to Jessee's hands but it was not clear if he managed to touch it or if it bounced over his hands cleanly. Texas' Roy Miller slapped the ball, keeping it in-bounds. Aaron Lewis picked up the ball and advanced it 13 yards to the Arizona State 44-yard line.

Replay officials took 12 minutes to review the play. On the video replays, the ball comes very close to Jessee's hands but it does not seem to change speed or trajectory as it goes past them. Despite the video replays providing no conclusive proof that Jessee had actually touched the ball officials ruled that he had made contact. The ball was declared dead at that point and the officials declared that Jessee had committed illegal interference; they declared an unsportsmanlike conduct penalty assessed against Texas. The ball went back to the Sun Devils and they were awarded half the distance to the goal, giving ASU fourth-and-3 at the 7-yard line. On the next play, Carpenter threw a touchdown pass to Chris McGaha to make the score 21–7 Texas.

Later in the second quarter, Arizona State had a fourth-and-two at the Texas 31-yard line. ASU tried for a first-down, but tight end Brent Miller allowed the pass to bounce off his hands and the Longhorns took over on downs. Texas drove the 69 yards to take a 28–7 lead. The drive included a fake punt on fourth-and-one where the Longhorns snapped the ball to upback Rashad Bobino who pushed ahead for a three-yard gain and a first down.

The Sun Devils made the score 28–10 on a 32-yard field goal by Thomas Weber. UT took over with less than a minute remaining in the half but were unable to get into scoring position before time expired. During the first half, Jamaal Charles averaged 9.6 yards per carry for Texas. The Longhorn defense held the Sun Devils to only 5 rushing yards in the entire half.

=== Third quarter ===
In the third quarter, as in the second quarter, the Sun Devils finished with a field-goal advantage but Texas forced another key turnover. On ASU's first drive they scored on a 46-yard field goal. Texas went three-and-out and punted to the Sun Devils who took over at the UT 40-yard line. ASU's first play was an apparent touchdown pass but it bounced out of the hands of the intended receiver and was intercepted by the Longhorns at the Texas 5.

Starting at their own 5-yard line, UT gave the ball to Charles for a one-yard gain. Then Charles fumbled but recovered the ball himself on the 8-yard line. A delay of game penalty moved Texas back to the 4-yard line. McCoy connected with Nate Jones for the first down at the UT 22. Seven plays later Texas was forced to punt but ASU's Kyle Williams fumbled the ball and Texas recovered on the ASU 32. Jamaal Charles rushed for a one-yard gain. On second down, McCoy made a 29-yard rush but fumbled the ball into the end zone; it was recovered by Jermichael Finley for a Longhorn touchdown, making the score 35–13.

Hunter Lawrence kicked off 55 yards for the Horns but ASU's Rudy Burgess returned it 35 yards to the 50-yard line. The Sun Devils scored on a 22-yard pass to Michael Jones. The third quarter ended with Texas on offense at the ASU 21-yard line. Texas also drew a second sideline infraction warning during the third quarter.

=== Fourth quarter ===
Texas completed that drive with a 21-yard field goal to make the score 38–20. The Sun Devils could not make a first yard down and punted back to Texas. The Horns put in John Chiles at quarterback and freshman Vondrell McGee at running back. McGee scored a touchdown on a 28-yard run. The Sun Devils replaced Carpenter with Danny Sullivan at quarterback. He led the team down the field and they scored on a 10-yard pass to Michael Jones. That made the score 45–27.

The Longhorns advanced to the ASU 34-yard line. Facing fourth-and-six, Texas took a timeout to consider their options. McCoy attempted a pass to Quan Cosby but it was incomplete and the Sun Devils took over on downs. With Sullivan still in at quarterback, the Sun Devils mounted a ten-play drive that culminated in a three-yard touchdown run by Jarrell Woods. That put Arizona State trailing by eleven points. They attempted an onside kick but Texas recovered it at the Arizona State 44-yard line. Charles carried the ball three-straight times for gains of 5, 7, and 32 yards and a touchdown.

The Sun Devils’ next drive ended when Danny Sullivan's pass was intercepted by Brandon Foster at the Texas 44-yard line and returned for 5 yards to the Texas 49-yard line. The Longhorns used three rushing plays to run out the clock.

== Analysis ==
The Longhorns won the game 52–34. The 52 points were the most ever scored by the Longhorns in their 47 bowl games. With the Longhorns in control through most of the game, many fans left early. The San Diego Union Tribune estimated that 5,000 fans remained in the stands at the end of the game. The game lasted 4 hours and 17 minutes – equaling the 1989 Penn State – BYU game as the longest Holiday Bowl to date.

UT's Colt McCoy and Brian Orakpo (defensive end) were chosen at the game's offensive and defensive MVPs respectively. McCoy went 21-for-31 passing for 174 yards and netted 84 yards rushing; he gained 147 yards on the ground but also lost 63, including 25 on two sacks. Orakpo made 4½ tackles for a loss – including two of the four sacks of Sun Devil starting quarterback Rudy Carpenter. Jamaal Charles rushed for 161 yards and two touchdowns. He reached 1,619 yards for the season and 3,328 for his career. That made him the fourth-leading rusher in UT history going into his senior season. Six days after the game, Jamaal Charles announced that he would forgo his senior season with Texas to enter the 2008 NFL draft.

On the Sun Devil side, quarterback Rudy Carpenter tied Jake Plummer for the second-most career touchdowns in school history with his 64th and 65th. Carpenter went 18-for-36 for 187 yards and two touchdowns. He also lost 45 yards on four sacks. Arizona State had a total of five turnovers.

Sports commentator Kirk Bohls of the Austin American-Statesman opined, “The truth of the matter is that the 17th-ranked Longhorns were everything most people thought they'd be in August as they bone-rattled a very good Arizona State team that came within an eyelash of a BCS berth. If Texas had been half this consistent all season, it'd be playing in a bowl game [after New Year’s Day]. But Mack Brown will settle for a better-late-than-never performance with an impressive 52–34 victory over the Pac-10 co-champion Sun Devils in a Holiday Bowl that was just shorter than the Bush years. Texas had made a habit of finishing strong with some spirited fourth-quarter rallies all season, but this time it started stronger than garlic breath and never let up. This Texas team knocked the ever-living stuffing out of ASU. This Texas team showed fire, showed passion and mostly showed up. These Longhorns finished the year with a fulfilling game that could possibly squeeze them into the top 10 and should titillate their fans for eight months and stoke a high 2008 preseason national ranking.”

=== Second quarter penalty ===
The controversial penalty was a big break for ASU as it resulted in a large momentum shift in allowing the Sun Devils to score. Video replays did show several Longhorns were on the field along with Jessee, despite an earlier bench warning that was given to Texas. For his role in inadvertently penalizing his team, Jessee has been compared to Steve Bartman, the man who may have inadvertently hurt the World Series prospects of the Chicago Cubs by interfering with a ball still in play. Unlike Bartman, Jessee's goof did not result in a loss for his team; the Longhorns were able to shrug off the setback. Commentators also joked that Jessee might star in the Southwest Airlines advertising campaign called wanna get away? which includes people in difficult or uncomfortable positions longing to leave town.

Asked about the play after the game, Jessee said “I did not touch the ball. I thought it was a forward pass and I was looking at the ball being thrown and I was signaling for a grounding penalty. Then, when I realized the ball was in play, I pulled my hands back... The guys played a great game. The focus shouldn't be on this.” During the game, Mack Brown was furious with the penalty call and insisted that Jessee did not touch the ball. After the game Brown said that Jessee stepping onto the field "[showed] how bad our family wanted to win the game".

Commentators agreed the play was extremely unusual. The Austin American-Statesman said that it was one of the most bizarre moments of an odd college football season. Nick Canepa of the San Diego Union-Tribune said, "I've been watching football since Jon Arnett and Ernie Zampese were playing for USC, and I've never seen anything like that. It was as if Jessee wanted it for a souvenir. Carpenter should have autographed it." Dennis Erickson said, "It's the most unusual play I've seen in college football." Former San Diego Charger Hank Bauer was asked if he had ever seen a similar play; he replied, "Never, ever, ever, ever, ever, ever. At any level." Kirk Bohls of the Austin American-Statesman said it was “one of the most bizarre plays in bowl history – let's just say the only thing missing was the Stanford band”. The game's replay official, Bob Patrick, explained afterwards that in such a bizarre circumstance, the officials have the right to award whatever penalty they feel is equitable.
