= Iron Chef (disambiguation) =

Iron Chef is a Japanese television cooking show produced by Fuji Television.

Iron Chef may also refer to:

- Iron Chef America, American show produced by Food Network
  - Iron Chef: Quest for an Iron Legend, American show produced by Netflix
- Iron Chef UK, British show originally broadcast on Channel 4
- Iron Chef Australia, Australian show produced by Seven Network
- Iron Chef Vietnam, Vietnamese show produced by Vietnam Television
- Iron Chef Canada, Canadian show produced by Food Network Canada
