= Stephen Yan =

Hong Kong-Canadian TV chef

- Born: 1939 (age 86–87); Hong Kong
- Culinary career
- Cooking style: Chinese
- Television shows
- Wok with Yan; Late Night with David Letterman; Good Morning America; Live with Regis and Kelly

Stephen Yan (born 1939) is a Hong Kong-Canadian television host. He hosted the Canadian television cooking show for CBC Television, Wok with Yan.

The Vancouver-based chef moved to Canada in the 1960s and owned two Chinese restaurants in Vancouver. Yan developed Wok with Yan with Carleton Productions in Ottawa, which had previously produced The Galloping Gourmet and Celebrity Cooks, and filmed two pilots in an unsuccessful attempt to sell the series to CTV Television Network. The network wasn't interested in the show, however, as they already had a cooking show and were also unimpressed with Martin Yan's Yan Can out of Calgary, which soured them on the concept of a Chinese cooking show. Yan returned to Vancouver where BCTV offered him a local show, which aired as Yan's Woking for two seasons in the late 1970s. The weekly show was very successful and drew more viewers than Battlestar Galactica in the same timeslot. CBC Television then agreed to buy Wok With Yan, originally as a summer replacement, for national broadcast on the network. The show, co-produced by Carleton Productions and Stephen Yan Productions, was originally filmed at CJOH's studios in Ottawa for two seasons before moving production to CBC Vancouver where new episodes were filmed until 1995. It initially aired on the CBC Television Network before moving to syndication and was sold around the world, including in the United States and Asia. Over 15 years, Yan produced over 500 episodes of Wok with Yan.

Yan also has produced travel and variety shows called Wok's Up? for CBC, and several half-hour travel specials on Thailand, Hong Kong, Japan, Walt Disney World, Malaysia, Singapore, and Fiji.

On May 14, 1986, Yan also released a 60-minute show on video cassette titled, Wok on the Wild Side, Wok with Yan Volume 2, where he showed how to prepare and cook the following menu: prawns in a nest, egg rolls, sweet and sour fish, gold coin beef, hot and sour soup, ginger lobster, and chicken with pineapple.

Yan's charismatic personality on his television show can be attributed to his spontaneous humour that included one-liners spoken with his trademark Cantonese accent or him playing with his food or cookware. He has appeared on Late Night with David Letterman, Good Morning America, Live with Regis and Kelly, and other shows from the United States to Australia.

A trademark of his was aprons that bore a different 'wok' pun every show.

Yan was the author of bestselling cookbooks:

- Vegetables the Chinese Way
- Creative Carving
- The Stephen Yan Seafood Wokbook
- Wok with Yan Television Cookbook

He also created various names for some of the ingredients that he used in his cooking, they include:

- "Chinese Water"
- "Wonder Powder"
- "Five Spicey"
- "Sesame Street Oil"

Wok Before You Run is another cooking videotape produced in the 1980s and distributed worldwide.

He is not related to Chinese-American chef Martin Yan of the PBS series Yan Can Cook, though Martin Yan worked for Stephen Yan for a year and was a protege who was trained as one of Stephen Yan's 'Flying Squad' of six chefs who flew across Canada to do demonstrations in Chinese cooking for events like the Calgary Stampede, the Klondike Days in Edmonton and houseware demonstrations at Hudson's Bay Company stores.
