= Charles Campion (disambiguation) =

Charles Campion (1951–2020) was a food critic.

Charles Campion may also refer to:

- Charles Antoine Campion (1720–1788), Italian composer
- Charles Campion, character in The Stand
