= Dog racing (disambiguation) =

Dog racing commonly refers to greyhound racing.

Dog racing or dog race may also refer to:

- Dachshund racing, a popular, yet controversial sporting event for dachshunds
- Dog scootering, a sport where one or more dogs pull a human riding an unmotorized kick scooter
- Lure coursing, a dog sport that involves chasing a mechanically operated lure
- Skijoring, a winter sport that involves a human on skis being pulled by a dog or horse
- Sled dog racing, a timed competitive winter sport where a team of sleddogs pulls a human riding a sled

== See also ==
- Coursing, a form of hunting where dogs are used to chase down game
