= Dione Lucas' Gourmet Club =

Dione Lucas’ Gourmet Club began airing each week on Tuesdays from 1958–1960 on WPIX-TV (New York), making her the first woman to ever be featured on a cooking show on this station. In addition, this was one of the first television cooking programs in the world. Previously, she had also been featured on To The Queen's Taste (December 1947 – 1953) on CBS and The Dione Lucas Cooking Show (1953–1956). This was the first time that efforts were made to appeal to housewives as a way of encouraging chores, such as cooking for the family. Lucas was extremely conservative and always taught her viewers to cook from scratch. Many attempts were made to syndicate the tapes of the series in other parts of the United States and this was one of the few cooking shows to go national during this era.

== See also ==
- List of cooking shows
