= Cooking for Dads =

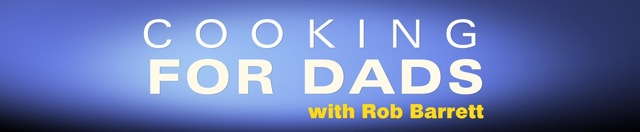
- Cooking for Dads official logo
- Genre: Cooking show
- Created by: Rob Barrett, Jr.
- Country of origin: United States
- Original language: English

Cooking for Dads is a YouTube show created by Rob Barrett, Jr. It was started with the idea of creating video recipes for visual learners who might be challenged by written recipes. The video recipes also include a trip to the grocery store to show which ingredients to buy. Having graduated from the Eastman School of Music in Rochester, NY, Barrett often draws on his musical talent to provide entertainment in his videos. He composed the show's opening theme. He also composes a year end song highlighting the year's activities. Barrett describes the show as "talk radio meets TV" and "a communal experience". He has no culinary training.

Cooking for Dads was the first YouTube show to have corporate sponsorship.(see first sponsored episode.) Barrett claims that this provides a quarter of his income. He is often called on to provide cooking segments on The Today Show, Twin Cities Live, "Fox 9" and other local television programs and competes in the cook-off contests these programs offer.

Cooking for Dads has received national and international attention. It has been featured in the Today Show, The New York Times, USA Today, The Guardian, and a Barbara Walters television special. Better Homes and Gardens awarded Barrett with the title of "America's Next Cooking Celebrity" in 2009. The show's videos have been embedded on thousands of sites worldwide and have, cumulatively, millions of views.

== See also ==
- List of cooking shows
