= Dachshund racing =

Form of dog racing

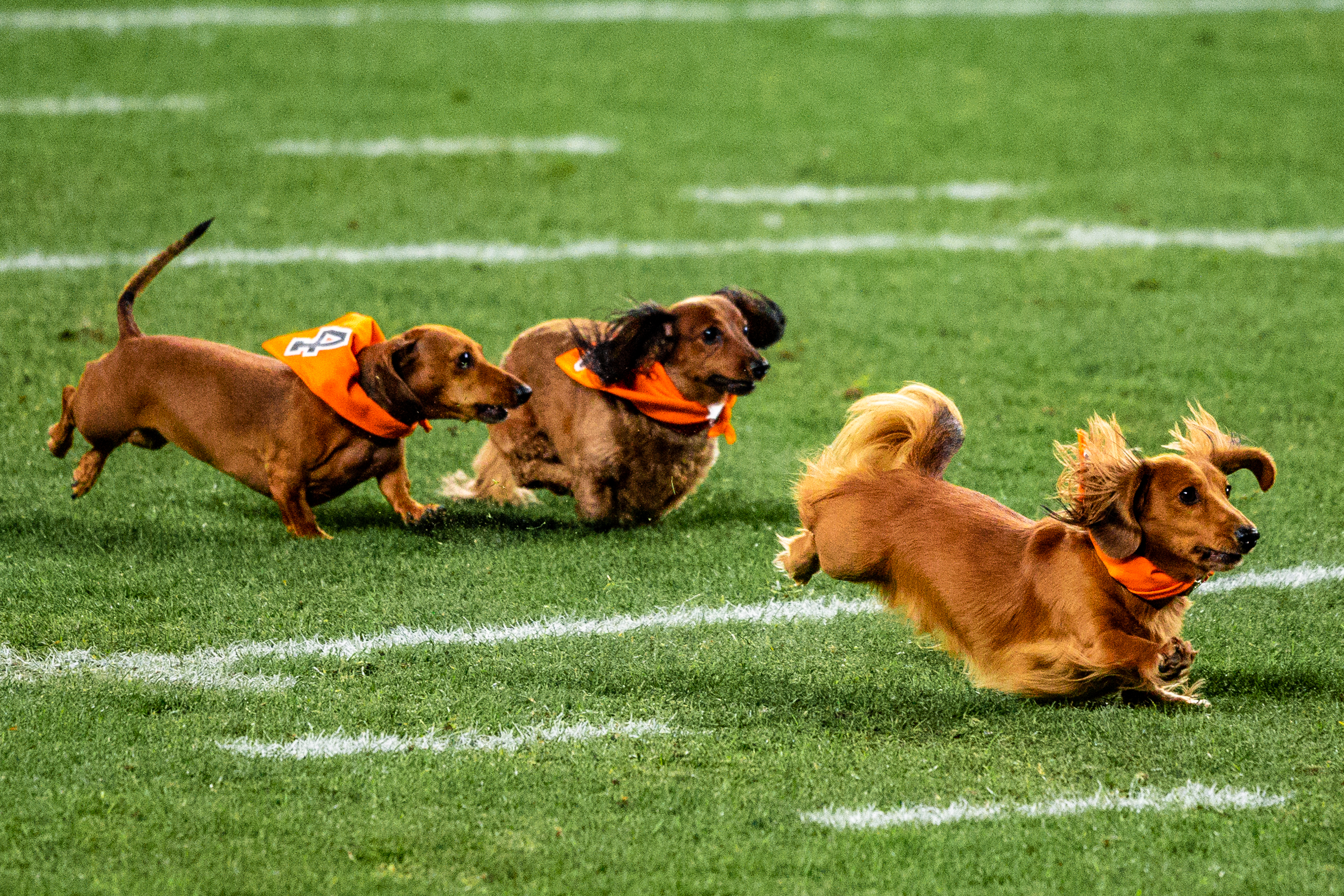
- Dachshund race in Cleveland, Ohio

Dachshund racing, or wiener dog racing, is a sporting event primarily found in North America. Typical dachshund races are either 25 or 50 yards (23 or 46 m) in length, and are run on various surfaces. Many race tracks across America host these events as fundraising or publicity events, and routinely draw the venues' largest attendance numbers of the year.

In the less formal events, most entrants are not career racers, nor bred for racing. Often, dogs will choose not to run the length of the course and instead visit with other dogs or the owner that released them. Otherwise, dogs will run swiftly to their owner at the finish line, coaxed by food or toys.

The de facto national championship of wiener dog racing is the Wienerschnitzel Wiener Nationals, held in San Diego, California, every December as part of the Holiday Bowl; however, many other events claim national championship status.

== History ==
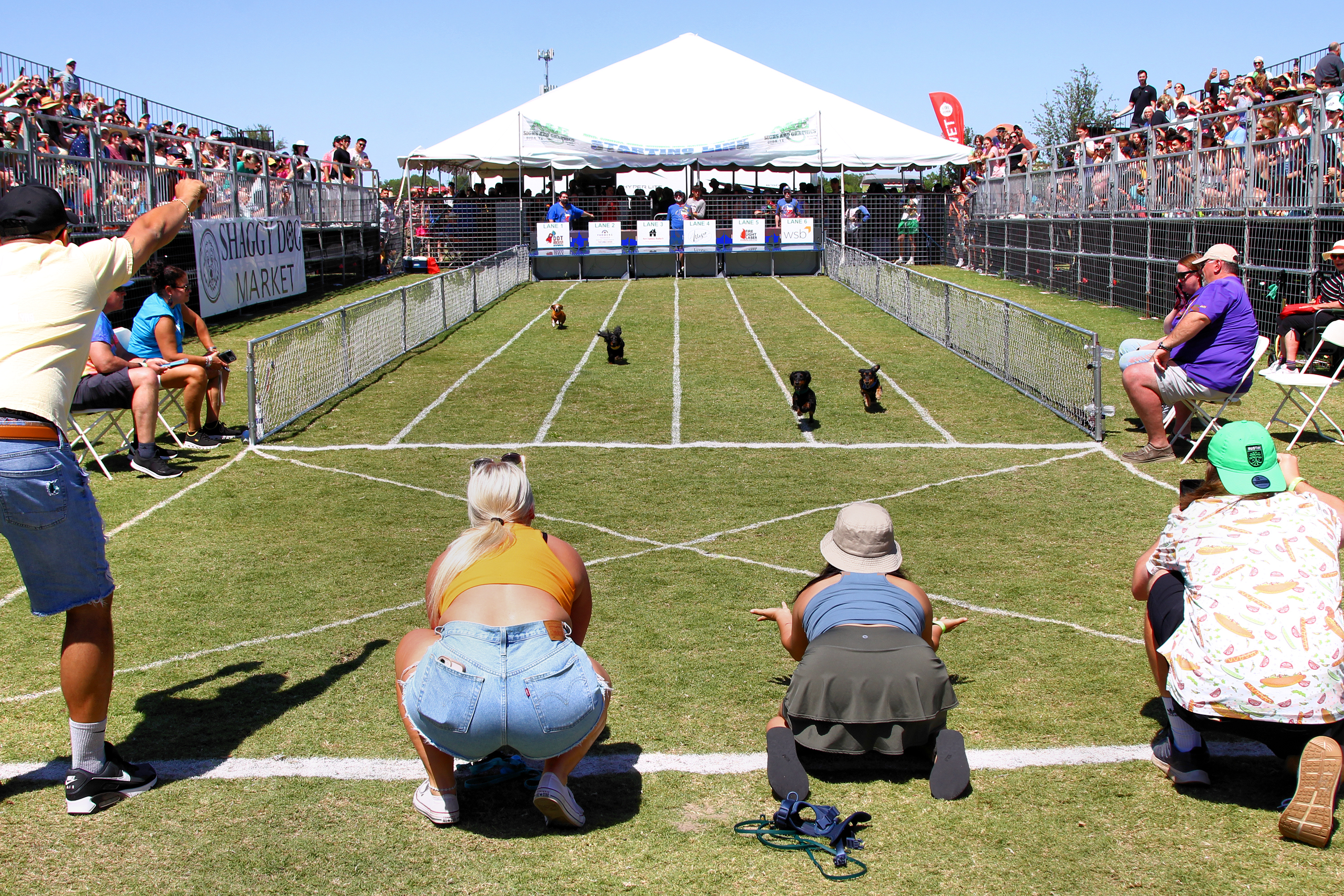
2023 wiener dog race in Buda, Texas

Dachshund racing was first held in Australia in the 1970s. The early meets featured Whippet, Afghan Hound, and Dachshund racing, purely for fun. The UC Davis School of Veterinary Medicine in California holds an annual Doxie Derby as part of the university's Picnic Day event. For over 30 years the races have been a fundraiser for veterinary students. Germantown, Tennessee, a suburb of Memphis, also hosts its own 'Running of the Wienies' for charity. Oktoberfest Zinzinnati includes a Running of the Wieners, with the dogs racing in hotdog costumes.

The sport rose in popularity in North America after a 1993 Miller Lite television commercial that listed odd sports, and continued to grow after the release of Wiener Takes All, a documentary film that chronicles two years of the Wiener Nationals circuit.

In 2009, the Wiener Dog Nationals in Fort Wayne, Indiana, held its 16th annual Dachshund race. Zeus, the Germanfest champ from 2006 to 2009, is generally recognized as the greatest racing dachshund of all time.

In 2016, the town of Bungendore in New South Wales, Australia held the inaugural Werriwa Wiener Dash to raise funds for Dachshund Rescue Australia. On 29 January 2017, the second Werriwa Wiener Dash was held which set the record for the most number of dachshunds in one place outside of a dog show with 154 dachshunds in attendance.

The sport was introduced to Canada in 2018 with the launch of an annual race at Fort Erie Race Track, which proved a major success for the track.

== Criticism ==
While some compare the sport to English and later American Greyhound racing, others see it as cruel and risky. The Dachshund Club of America opposes dachshund races, because the breed has a genetic predisposition to back injuries.

== Examples ==
- The Wienerschnitzel Wiener Nationals, held in California since 1996
