= Picnic Day (UC Davis) =

Social event at a U.S. university

Picnic Day is an annual open house event held in April at the University of California, Davis. Picnic Day was first held on May 22, 1909. It has grown to be what is believed to be the largest student-run event in the United States, typically drawing more than 50,000 visitors. In 2009, around 125,000 visitors attended Picnic Day – a new attendance record.

In 2020, Picnic Day 106 was cancelled due to the COVID-19 pandemic. The in-person event returned in 2022 with Picnic Day 108.

== Events and attractions ==
Most departments put on exhibitions, competitions, or presentations to introduce themselves to the public. Due in large part to UC Davis' reputation as one of the finest veterinary medicine institutions in the country, Picnic Day features dozens of exhibitions featuring animals, including the famed geep, a goat-sheep chimera, and John P. Ork. Other parts of the celebration include a parade, Dachshund racing, equestrian demonstrations, and a Battle of the Bands.

== Organization ==
Picnic Day is organized by a board of directors consisting of 18–20 students, ranging from different backgrounds and talents. Directors are full-time students and active participants of other extra-curricular activities and events in UC Davis. Every year, the board of directors selects a theme that will reflect the mission and vision of that year's Picnic Day.

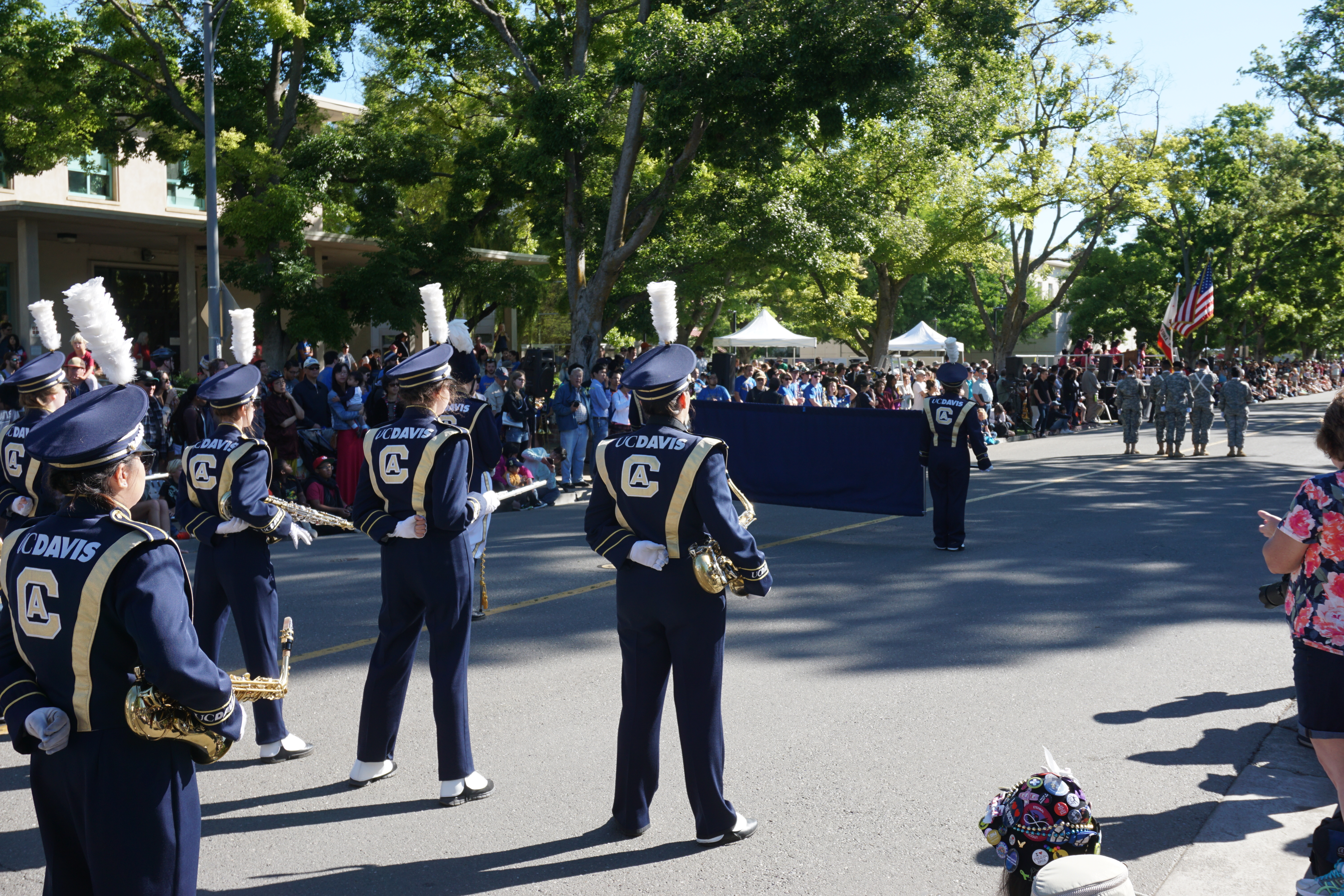
Picnic Day Parade. Honor Guard and UC Davis marching band.

=== Parade marshals ===
Since 1962, the board of directors elects one or more parade marshals to be the distinguished guest(s) of Picnic Day. A subcommittee of directors evaluates a pool of candidates from different backgrounds. In selecting the parade marshal(s), the subcommittee is looking for individual(s) who show commitment to their work, personify the current theme, represent Aggie Pride, have contributed to the campus and Davis community, and, most of all, are role models to society. Picnic Day has selected individuals engaged in the arts, sciences, politics and other fields.

== Safety concerns ==
The size of the event has sparked some controversy. In 2010, there were 545 calls to police. Davis enacted a Safety Enhancement Zone (SEZ) around downtown and doubled fines for certain infractions committed on Picnic Day in the zone. In 2016, the SEZ was expanded. The northern margin of the zone was moved to Covell Blvd. (up from 8th St.) and the western margin was moved to State Route 113 (over from Anderson Rd.) There was one accidental death off campus during the 2011 event.

== Past parade marshals ==
- 2024 – Sheri Atkinson
- 2023 – Cecelia Maikai-Beard
- 2022 – Nam Tran
- 2021 – Maisha T. Winn, Lawrence Torry Winn
- 2020 – Jamie Peyton
- 2019 – Sarah T. Steward
- 2018 – Thomas Famula, Michelle Famula
- 2017 – Bryan Enderle, Isao Fujimoto
- 2016 – Ramsey Mussallam
- 2015 – Jane Eadie, Richard Kossak
- 2014 – Sandy Holman, Hal & Carol Sconyers
- 2013 – Richard McCapes and Babe Slater
- 2012 – Ruth Asmundson, Rich Engel, Cathy West
- 2011 – Mark Champagne, Jim Sochor
- 2010 – Tom and Meg Stallard
- 2009 – Gabriella Wong, Robert “Bob” Black
- 2008 – Antoinette "Butterscotch" Clinton, Chef Martin Yan
- 2007 – Yvonne Marsh, Bay Butler, Dr. Bryan Jenkins
- 2006 – Dr. Douglas Gross, Steven James Tingus, Lois Wolk, Dr. Liz Applegate
- 2005 – Jack Farmer, Kelly Albin, Dawn Imamoto
- 2004 – Professor Niels Pedersen, Dr. Stylianos Spyradakis, Klea Bertakis
- 2003 – John Boe, Richard & Evelyn Rominger
- 2002 – Robert and Margrit Mondavi
- 2001 – Randolph M. Siverson, Ted Adams, Jackie Speier
- 2000 – Francisco Rodriguez, Jamila Demby
- 1999 – Stephen Robinson, Mayra Welch, Thomas Duncan
- 1998 – Deanne Vochatzer, Vic Fazio, Yvonne Lee, Celeste Turner Wright
- 1997 – Delaine Eastin, Dennis Mceil, Ann Veneman, Ken Verosub
- 1996 – Carol Wall
- 1995 – Ida Mae Hunter, Peter Dietrich
- 1994 – Tom Dutton, Darby Morrisroe
- 1993 – Orville and Erna Thompson
- 1992 – Wayne and Jaque Bartholomew
- 1991 – Fred Wood
- 1990 – Harry O. Walker
- 1989 – Leslie Campbell
- 1988 – Ted Hullar
- 1987 – James H. Meyer
- 1986 – Warren D. Mooney
- 1985 – Jim Sochor
- 1984 – Harry J. Colvin, Jr.
- 1983 – Philip Dubois
- 1982 – Marilyn Etzler
- 1981 – Gary Ford
- 1980 – Lawrence Shepard
- 1979 – Arnold Sillman
- 1978 – Bob Krieger
- 1977 – Ruth Anderson
- 1976 – Thomas L. Allen
- 1975 – Celeste Turner Wright
- 1974 – Dick Lewis
- 1973 – G. Ledyard Stebbins
- 1972 – Chancellor Meyer
- 1971 – Wilson Riles
- 1970 – Earl Warren, Sr.
- 1969 – Emil Mrak
- 1968 – Chester O. McCorkle
- 1967 – Maynard A Amerine
- 1966 – Blaine McGowan
- 1965 – Lt. Gov. Glenn M. Anderson
- 1964 – Emil Mrak
- 1963 – Edwin C. Voorhies
- 1962 – Robert Sproul

== Distinguished Faculty Member ==
In addition the board of Picnic Day 2008: “A Kaleidoscope of Voices” introduced, for the first time in Picnic Day history, “Distinguished Faculty Member.” This title honors the faculty of UC Davis.

- 2008 – Charles Bamforth, Ph.D., Virginia Hamilton, Ph.D., Andrew Waterhouse, Ph.D.

== Past themes ==
- 2025 "Welcome to Wonderland"
- 2024 "Picnic Palooza"
- 2023 "Ignite Our Moment"
- 2022 "Rediscovering Tomorrow"
- 2021 "Discovering Silver Linings"
- 2020 "Envisioning Tomorrow"
- 2019 "Adventure Awaits"
- 2018 "Where the Sun Shines"
- 2017 "Growing Together"
- 2016 "Cultivating Our Authenticity"
- 2015 "Heart of Our Community"
- 2014 "100: A Timeless Aggie Tradition"
- 2013 "Snapshot"
- 2012 "Then, Now, Always"
- 2011 "Rewind"
- 2010 "Carpe Davis: Seizing Opportunities"
- 2009 "Reflections: 100 Years of Aggie Legacy "
- 2008 "A Kaleidoscope of Voices"
- 2007 "Making our Mark"
- 2006 "Celebrate TODAY"
- 2005 "LIVE on One Shields Ave"
- 2004 "Shifting Gears for 90 years"
- 2003 "Rock the Picnic"
- 2002 "Open Mind, Open Door"
- 2001 "Aggies Shine Together"
- 2000 "Life's A Picnic"
- 1999 "Moo-ving into the Future"
- 1998 "Breaking New Ground"
- 1997 "UC Davis Outstanding in Its Fields"
- 1996 "Carrying the Torch of Tradition"
- 1995 "Down To Earth"
- 1994 "Students Shining Through"
- 1993 "Faces of the Future"
- 1992 "Moovin Ahead"
- 1991 "Catch the Spirit, Build a Better U"
- 1990 "Shaping Our Environment with Diversity, Tradition and Style"
- 1989 "Challenging Our Future Today"
- 1988 "Progress Backed By Tradition"
- 1987 "On the Move"
- 1986 "Reaching New Heights"
- 1985 "Setting the Pace"
- 1984 "Celebrating Excellence: UCD's Diamond Anniversary"
- 1983 "Meeting the Challenge"
- 1981 "'81 A Vintage Year"
- 1980 "Decade Debut"
- 1979 "Aggie Energy"
- 1978 "Davis Directions"
- 1976 "UCDiversity"
- 1975 "Hay Day"
- 1974 "Cycles"
- 1973 "The Farm Mooves"
- 1972 "Remember the First"
- 1971 "Memories of the Past... A Challenge to the Future"
- 1970 "Blowing in the Wind"
- 1969 "Freewheeling & Family"
- 1968 "Know Your University and 100 Years Later"
- 1967 "Farm"
- 1965 "Aggie Country"
- 1964 "Today's Aggie Family"
- 1963 "Aggie Jubilee"
- 1962 "Kaleidoscope '62"
- 1961 "Workshop for the World"
- 1960 "Foundations for the Future"
- 1959 "U-Diversity"
- 1958 "Showcase of Progress"
- 1957 "Campus Cavalcade"
- 1956 "Aggie Milestones"
- 1955 "Future Unlimited"
- 1954 "California Cornucopia"
- 1953 "At Home"
- 1952 "Preview of Progress"
- 1951 "Harvest of Science"
- 1950 "Cavalcade of Agriculture"
- 1949 "Research Makes the Difference"
