= Wiener Takes All: A Dogumentary =

- Directed by: Shane MacDougall
- Written by: Marion Law; Shane MacDougall
- Produced by: Marion Law; Shane MacDougall
- Release date: 2007
- Country: Canada
- Language: English

Wiener Takes All: A Dogumentary is a 2007 documentary film that chronicles the lives of America's top competitive dachshunds and their owners. Directed by Shane MacDougall, the film follows five competitors in the Wienerschnitzel "Wiener Nationals" dachshund racing circuit, from the scandal of the 2003 Wiener Nationals, through to the 2005 championships this December in San Diego. The film opens with Noodles' controversial 2003 loss, and the ensuing Noodles-Pretzel rivalry - one that is cut short with Pretzel's tragic sudden death. Only a few weeks later Noodles triumphantly wins the 2004 Wiener Nationals - this time free and clear. The glory is short-lived, as he is forced into retirement by race organizers, and Team Noodles has to decide whether to accept his premature sojourn from the sport, or try and qualify out of state.

The film also follows some of America's top show dogs as they go to the Westminster Kennel Club Dog Show, then switches gears and heads to the heartland of Texas for the DCA Earthdog championships. Allegations of doping, match fixing, animal cruelty, and discrimination are investigated, and revealing interviews with some of America's top judges, including Anne Rogers Clark, explain the background of some of the famous controversies in the dachshund (and dog show) world.

== Screenings ==
- 27th Atlantic Film Festival (2007)
- 2007 San Francisco Documentary Film Festival
- 2007 BendFilm
- 2008 Laguna Beach Film Society/Museum of Art (kickoff documentary)
- 2008 Garden State Film Festival
- 2008 Lake County Film Festival
- 2008 Palm Beach International Film Festival
- 2008 Arizona International Film Festival
- 2008 Los Angeles United Film Festival
- Oklahoma City Museum of Art (2008)
