= Charles Campion =

English television personality and food critic (1951–2020)

- Born: Charles Robert Campion; 17 October 1951; Leamington Spa, Warwickshire, England
- Died: 23 December 2020 (aged 69)
- Occupation: Food critic

Charles Robert Campion (17 October 1951 – 23 December 2020) was an English television personality and food critic who wrote for The Times, The Independent, and the Evening Standard.

== Biography ==
Campion was born in Leamington Spa, Warwickshire, the son of Geoffrey Campion and Meriel Campion (née Swann). He was educated at Blundell's School in Tiverton, Devon and at Watford Art College, Hertfordshire.

== Early career ==
After 15 years in the London-based advertising industry, Campion took a career change in 1988 and with his wife Sylvia purchased a small hotel, Cold Springs House, in Buxton, Derbyshire. Renovating it into a luxury hotel and restaurant, he took on the role of head chef - the only light in what became an abortive and failing enterprise. The hotel closed in 1991.

== Food Critic ==
Campion moved on to become a food journalist, writing restaurant reviews and food articles for The Independent, The Times, The Weekend Telegraph, The Illustrated London News, BBC Good Food Magazine, Epicurean Life and Delicious. He was a regular judge at both the British Cheese Awards and the International Cheese Awards. He won the Glenfiddich "Restaurant Writer of the Year" Award in 1997 and in 2018 the Great Taste award for contribution to fine food.

Between 1999 and 2005 Campion wrote seven editions of the Rough Guide to London Restaurants. He also wrote three cookery books with chef Theodore Kyriakou: The Livebait Cookbook, Real Greek Food and The Real Greek at Home. He wrote the culinary memoir Fifty Recipes To Stake Your Life On, the barbecue recipe book Food from Fire and Eat Up!. The third edition of Charles Campion's London Restaurant Guide was published in 2008.

== Television work ==
Campion appeared in the media, mainly on MasterChef, Celebrity MasterChef and in January 2013 on Celebrity Mastermind. He co-presented the Sky UK series Greatest Dishes in the World.

== Marriage and children ==
Campion married Sylvia Murray in 1986. They had two children.

== Death ==
Campion died on 23 December 2020 at the age of 69, from complications of heart disease. He was surrounded by his wife, son and daughter.
