= Daisy Martinez =

American chef

Daisy Maria Martinez is an actress, model, chef, television personality, and author, who hosted a PBS television series, Daisy Cooks!, which launched on April 15, 2005.

== Career ==
Daisy Martinez was born to stateside Puerto Rican parents in Brooklyn, New York, and they lived with her grandmother until she was almost five years old. From her grandmother, Valentina, and her mother, Conchita, she developed an appreciation of Latin cuisine. She attended Long Island University, where she met her first husband.

Before becoming a TV chef, Martinez was an actress and model. She became the Martinez Valero Girl for the Spanish shoe company by the same name. She appeared in American commercials for Ford, and in Spanish-language commercials for AT&T. She has also appeared in Carlito’s Way and Scent of a Woman.

In 1998, Martinex matriculated at the French Culinary Institute, where she won first prize for her final project, "The Passionate Palate". Shortly after graduation, Daisy worked on the set of PBS' Lidia's Italian-American Kitchen as a prep-kitchen chef. In 2005, she did Daisy Cooks for PBS. She worked as a private chef in New York City for three years. In addition, Martinez managed a small catering business, "The Passionate Palate", which she continues to operate.

One of her books was IACP nominee and winner of the Best Latino Cuisine Cookbook in the World by the Gourmand World Cookbook Awards.

In January 2009, she hosted a six episode series, Viva Daisy!, on Food Network.

Raised in Eltingville, Staten Island, Martinez has resided in Park Slope, Brooklyn. She is divorced from her husband Jerry, a medical doctor. She is the mother of four children: Marc, Erik, David, and Angela.
