= Sawyer Point Park & Yeatman's Cove =

Pair of parks in Cincinnati, Ohio, U.S.

Coordinates: 39°06′00″N 84°29′57″W

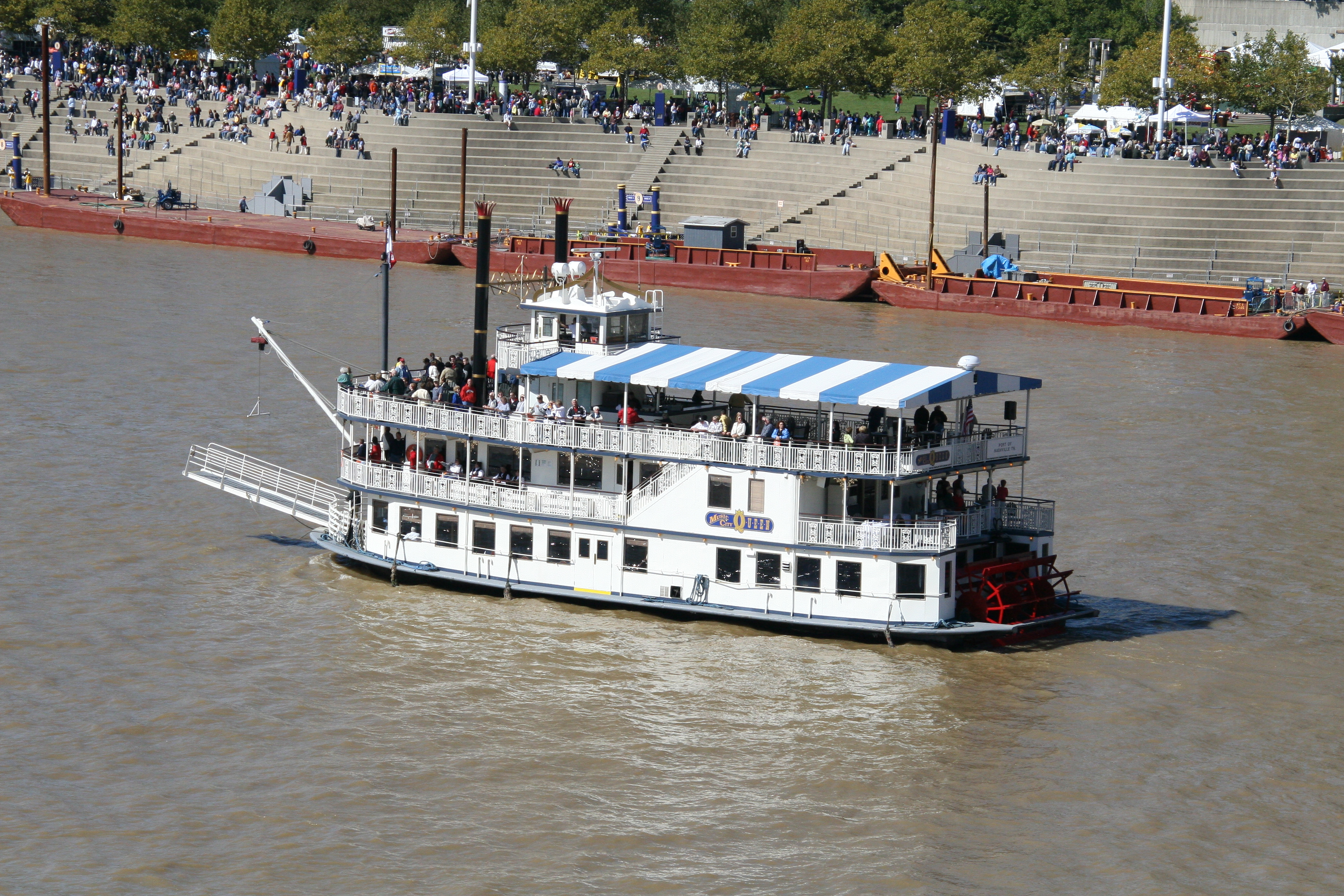
Serpentine Wall during Tall Stacks

Sawyer Point Park & Yeatman's Cove are a pair of side-by-side parks on the riverfront of downtown Cincinnati, Ohio, United States. The two linear parks stretch one mile along the north shore of the Ohio River. Since 2024, the parks have hosted Oktoberfest Zinzinnati. Additionally, the parks have perennially hosted the APP Tour Vlasic Classic and previously hosted the Bunbury Music Festival.

== Yeatman's Cove ==
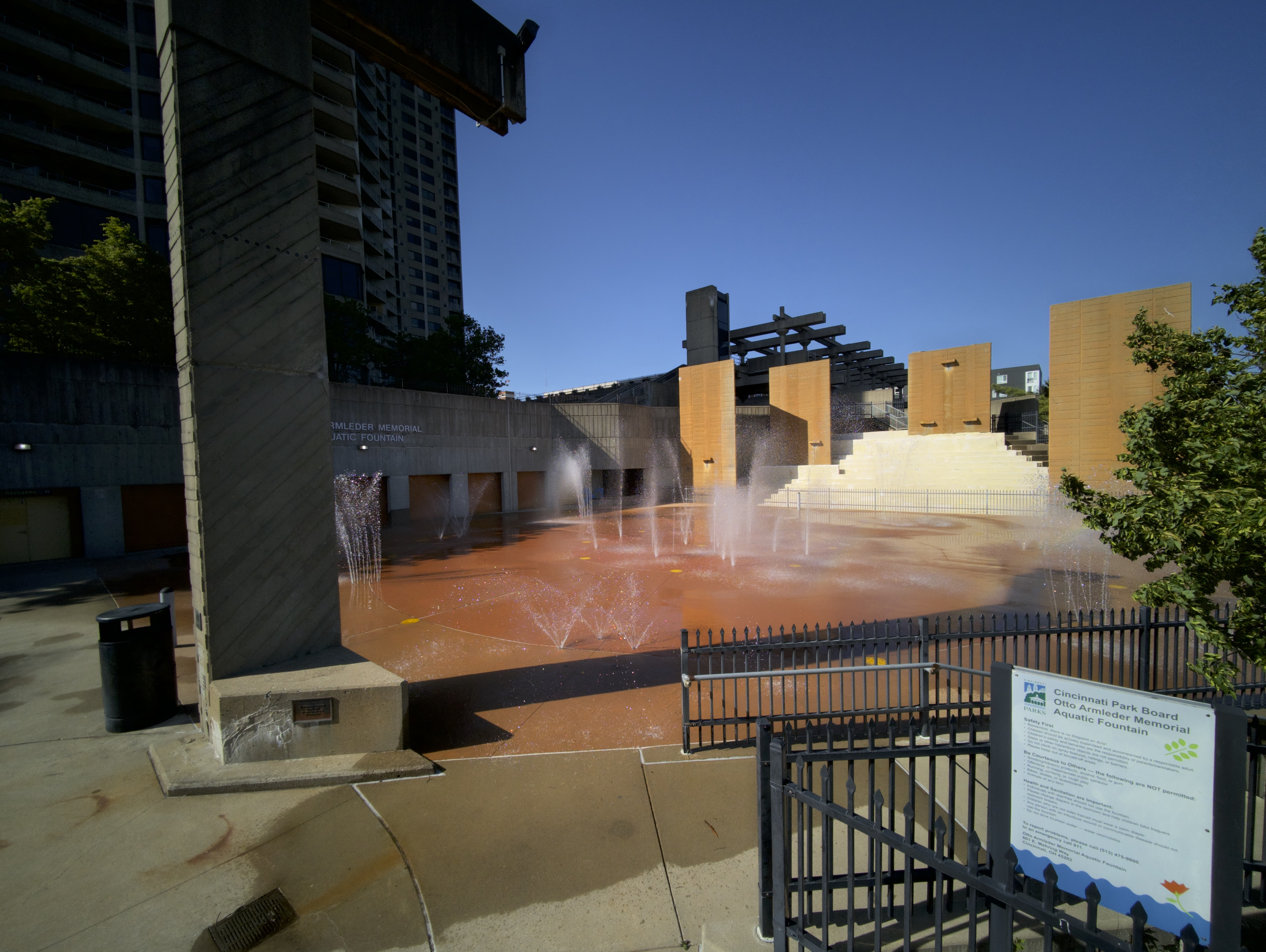
The Otto Armleder Aquatic Park in Yeatman's Cove, along the Cincinnati riverfront.

Yeatman's Cove park occupies the former site of a tavern established in 1793 by Griffin Yeatman. Yeatman's establishment was the first tavern in Cincinnati, and as such was very popular with men working on the river. The park features a colossal bronze statue of Cincinnatus, the namesake of Cincinnati, and is a popular place to watch the Cincinnati Bell/WEBN Riverfest at Labor Day weekend.

== Serpentine Wall ==
The Serpentine Wall is a serpentine-shaped flood wall on the banks of the Ohio River, located at Yeatman's Cove. Completed in 1976, the wall features steps descending to the river, upon which visitors can sit and look across to Northern Kentucky.
