= Martin Yan =

Chinese-American chef and food writer (born 1948)

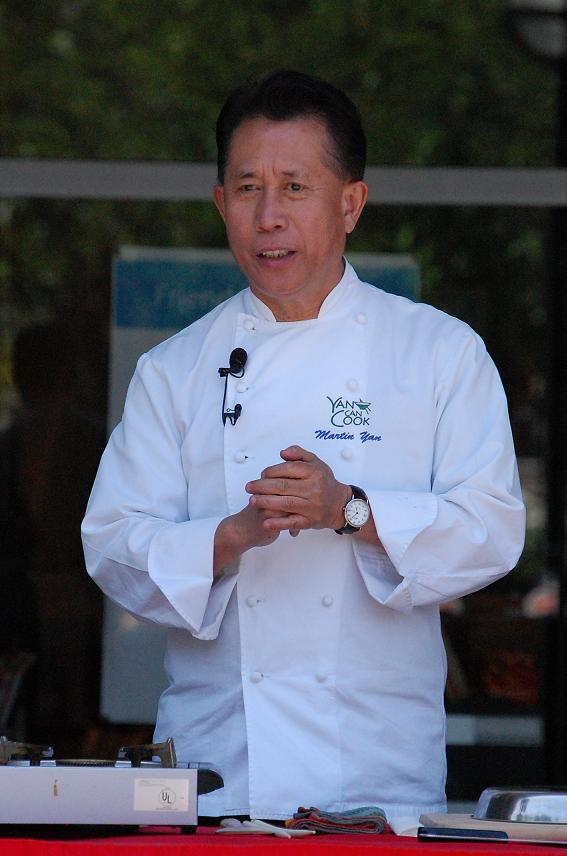
- Yan in 2009
- Born: Yan Man-daat; 22 December 1948 (age 77); Guangzhou, Guangdong, China
- Education: Munsang College; Overseas Institute of Cookery of Hong Kong; University of California, Davis
- Culinary career
- Cooking style: Cantonese
- Current restaurants
- (closed: M.Y. Asia (Las Vegas)) (closed: M.Y. China (San Francisco)) (closed: Yan Can (Santa Clara)) (closed: M.Y. China (Rohnert Park))
- Television shows
- Yan Can Cook; Martin Yan – Quick & Easy; Martin Yan's Chinatowns; Martin Yan's Hong Kong; Martin Yan's Asian Favourites

Chinese name
- Traditional Chinese: 甄文達
- Simplified Chinese: 甄文达
Transcriptions
Standard Mandarin
- Hanyu Pinyin: Zhēn Wéndá
- Bopomofo: ㄓㄣ ㄨㄣˊㄉㄚˊ
- Gwoyeu Romatzyh: Jen Wendar
- Wade–Giles: Chen Wen-ta
Yue: Cantonese
- Yale Romanization: Yan^{1} Man^{4} Daat^{6}
- Jyutping: Jan^{1} Man^{4} Daat^{6}
- IPA: [jɐn˥ mɐn˩ tat̚˨]
- Website: www.yancancook.com

Martin Yan Man-daat (Chinese: 甄文達; Cantonese Yale: Yan^{1} Man^{4} Daat^{6}; born 22 December 1948) is a Hong Kong-American chef and food writer. He has hosted his award-winning PBS-TV cooking show Yan Can Cook since 1982.

== Early years and education ==
With ancestral roots in Hoiping, Yan was born in Guangzhou, Guangdong, China to a restaurateur father and a grocer mother. Yan began to cook at the age of 12. When he was 13, he moved to Hong Kong, where he attended the Munsang College in Kowloon City. During this time in Munsang College, he worked at his uncle's Chinese restaurant and learned the traditional method of Cantonese barbecue. He received a diploma from the Overseas Institute of Cookery of Hong Kong and later left for Canada for continued study. Ten years after his arrival in North America, Yan received a Master of Science degree in food science from University of California, Davis, in 1975.

He is not related to Chinese-Canadian chef Stephen Yan of Wok With Yan, though for a year in the 1970s, Martin Yan worked for Stephen Yan who trained him as one of Stephen Yan's 'Flying Squad' of six chefs who flew across Canada to do demonstrations in Chinese cooking for events like the Calgary Stampede, the Klondike Days in Edmonton and houseware demonstrations at Hudson's Bay Company stores.

== Career ==
Yan began teaching Chinese cooking for a college extension program. While in Calgary helping a friend open a restaurant he appeared on a talk show on CFAC-TV (now CICT-DT) to do a cooking segment resulting in his being asked back repeatedly. This led to 250 daily editions of his original series Yan Can being produced and syndicated from CFAC for four years until moving to KQED in San Francisco in 1982 becoming Yan Can Cook.

He has hosted over 3,500 episodes of the PBS cooking show Yan Can Cook since 1982. His shows have been broadcast in over 50 countries. He currently hosts Martin Yan – Quick & Easy. He also hosts Martin Yan's Chinatowns, where he tours Chinatowns around the globe, as well as Martin Yan's Hidden China.

Yan has opened a chain of Yan Can Restaurants and founded the Yan Can International Cooking School in San Francisco. He has written over two dozen cookbooks. The American Culinary Federation has designated him a Master Chef.

Yan is one of the lead actors of the Singapore/Hong Kong film Rice Rhapsody (海南雞飯, 2005).

In 2007, he supported and endorsed the establishment of the World Association of Master Chefs.

He has appeared as a guest judge on several episodes of Iron Chef America and appeared on the cartoon talk show Space Ghost Coast to Coast. He also appeared as a guest judge on the Season 10 finale of Top Chef as well as a Season 11 episode of Hell's Kitchen.

In 2023, Yan said that he planned on reopening his M.Y. China restaurant in San Francisco. He said that he considered reopening the restaurant in the former home of Cathay House restaurant (which was closed in 2018).

== Television appearances ==
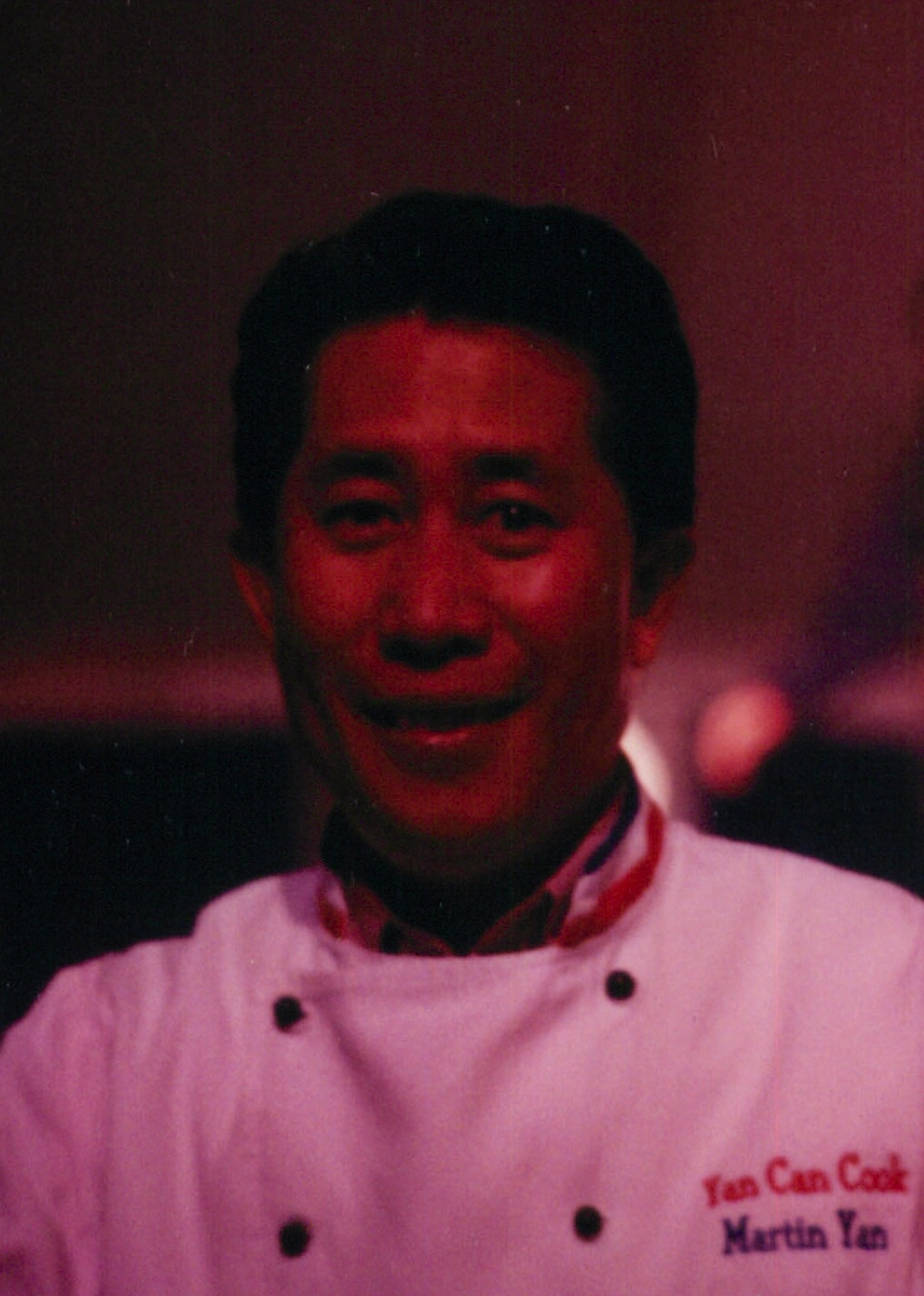
Martin Yan in 1994

- Yan Can (1978–1982) — Host
- Yan Can Cook (1982— ) – Host
- Christine Cushing Live – Guest
- Space Ghost Coast to Coast (1996) – Guest
- Martin Yan's Hong Kong (2005–2007) – Host
- Martin Yan – Quick & Easy – Host
- Martin Yan's Chinatowns – Host
- Yan Can Cook: Spice Kingdom- Host
- Martin Yan's China (2008) – host
- Iron Chef America (2011) – Judge
- Food Court (2011) Hong Kong Cable TV – Tutor / Host
- Iron Chef Vietnam (2012) – Guest Judge
- Top Chef (2013) – Guest Judge
- Hell's Kitchen (2013) – Guest Judge
- Martin Yan: Taste of Vietnam (2013) – Host
- Back to Basics (2013) – Host
- Martin Yan: Taste of Malaysia (2015) – Host
- Rick Stein's Road to Mexico - Episode 1 (2017) - Guest
- Martin Yan's Asian Favorites (2018— ) - Host

== Cookbooks ==
- Chinese Recipes (1978)
- The Joy of Wokking (1978)
- The Yan Can Cook Book (1981, reprinted 1983)
- Everybody's Wokking
- The Well-Seasoned Wok
- Martin Yan's Feast: The Best of Yan Can Cook
- Chinese Cooking for Dummies
- Martin Yan's Asian Favorites
- Martin Yan's Quick and Easy
- Martin Yan's Chinatowns
- Martin Yan's Chinatown Cooking: 200 Traditional Recipes From 11 Chinatowns Around the World
- Martin Yan's Culinary Journey Through China
- Martin Yan's Asia
- Martin Yan’s China
- Martin Yan's Entertainment At-Home
- Martin Yan the Chinese Chef
- Martin Yan's Invitation to Chinese Cooking
- Martin Yan's Feast
- A Wok for All Seasons, 1988

== Restaurants ==
Restaurants owned by Martin Yan
Restaurant	Location	Active Dates	Notes	Ref
SensAsian	Irvine, California	March 2003– Unknown		
M.Y. Asia	Horseshoe Las Vegas	March 2023–August 2023		
M.Y. China	Westfield San Francisco Centre mall	2012–2020	closed due to COVID-19 pandemic; co-owned by Koi Palace, Daly City owners	
M.Y. China	Graton Resort and Casino; Rohnert Park, California	2013–2015		
Yan Can	Santa Clara, California			

== Awards ==
- An honorary Doctorate of Culinary Arts by Johnson & Wales University
- A Daytime Emmy Award in 1998 for best cooking show
- A 1996 James Beard Award for Best TV Food Journalism
- A 1994 James Beard Award for Best TV Cooking Show
- The Antonin Careme Award by the Chef's Association of the Pacific Coast
- The Courvoisier Leadership Award by Courvoisier
- 2008 Picnic Day (UC Davis) parade marshal
- 2022 James Beard Lifetime Achievement Award

== See also ==
- Chinese American cuisine
- Cantonese cuisine
- Food science
