= Cookin' Cheap =

- Starring: Larry Bly (1981–2002); Laban Johnson (1981–1994, 1996–1999); Doug Patterson (1999–2002)
- Country of origin: United States

Production
- Running time: 28 minutes

Original release
- Network: PBS
- Release: 1981 – October 2002

Cookin' Cheap is a nationally syndicated cooking show, originally hosted by Larry Bly and Earl "Laban" Johnson, Jr. (July 29, 1941 - March 2, 1999). Cookin' Cheap was taped in the studios of Blue Ridge Public Television in Roanoke, Virginia. It began its national distribution through the PBS system in 1981, and more recently did a syndication run on the GoodLife TV Network.

Cookin' Cheap contrasted itself with contemporary cooking shows of its time by not attempting to hide the tedious preparation work that goes into cooking a recipe, and by using common ingredients purchased at local supermarkets in Roanoke, Virginia, where the show was produced. Johnson stated that the idea for the show was born from the frustration he suffered when trying to recreate the recipes of Julia Child, lacking ingredients that are unavailable in a small southern town.

== Laban Johnson's illness and death ==
Laban Johnson suffered from complications of congestive heart failure and diabetes in his later years. In 1994, he temporarily took a leave from the show to undergo and recover from heart surgery. He returned in 1996. On March 2, 1999, Johnson was found dead at his apartment in Roanoke, Virginia by several members of the production staff, when he failed to show up for a taping. He was 57. Before his death, Johnson left instructions for Larry Bly to write and deliver his eulogy at his funeral, which he did. Johnson was replaced by Doug Patterson, his hand-picked successor, for the remainder of the show's run.

== Cancellation ==
The show ended its run in October 2002. Budget cuts were cited as the reason for the cancellation, even though Bly has claimed the show only cost $20,000 per year to produce. Bly claims that even though Blue Ridge Public Television "threw all the master tapes in the trash", he has located alternate master tapes, as well as securing the copyright to the show, and plans to release a DVD series.
