= Oktoberfest Zinzinnati =

Annual festival in Cincinnati, Ohio

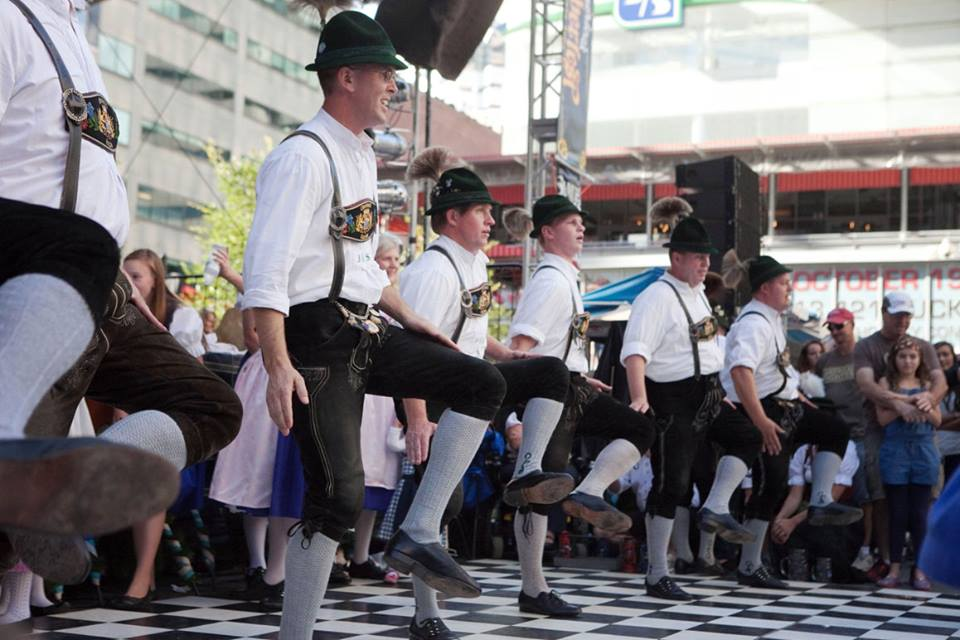
- Dancers perform the Schuhplattler, 2015
- Date: Designated weekend in September
- Frequency: Annual
- Location: Cincinnati, Ohio
- Founded: 1976
- Attendance: 800,000
- Website: oktoberfestzinzinnati.com

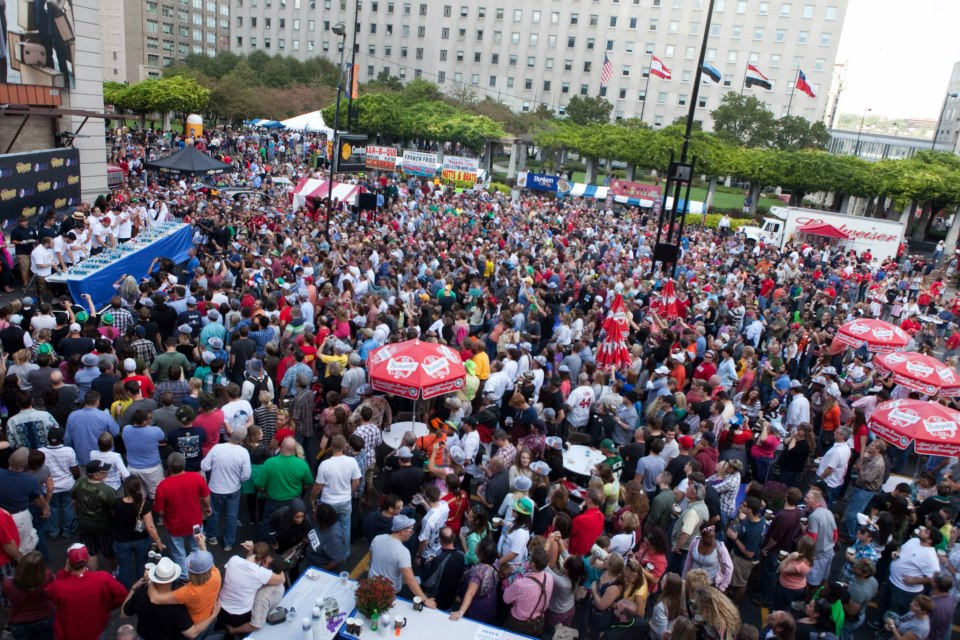
Brat Eating Contest at Oktoberfest Zinzinnati 2012

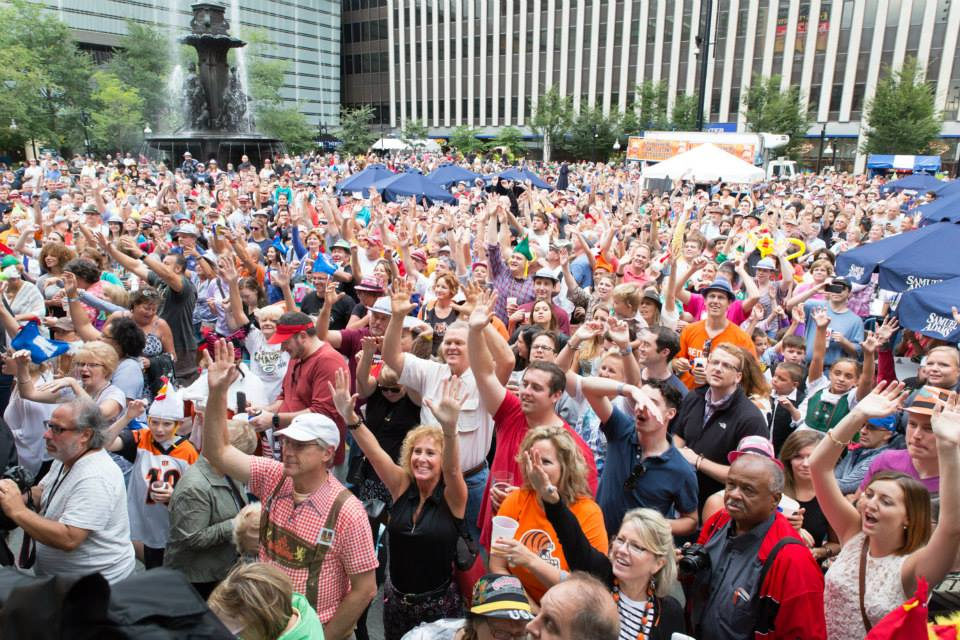
More than 30,000 participated in the World's Largest Chicken Dance in 2015, led by former Bengals quarterback Ken Anderson.

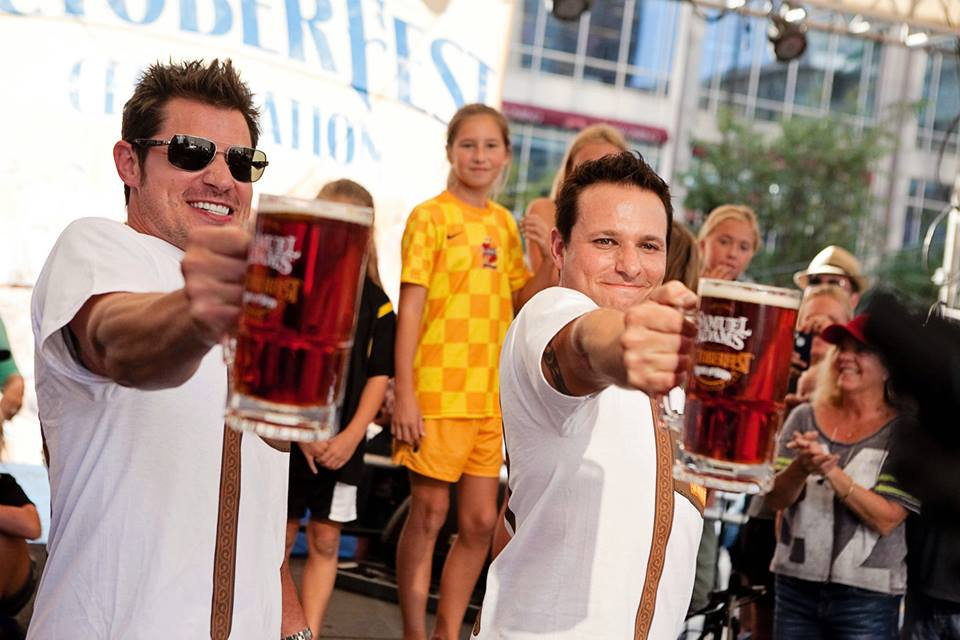
Drew and Nick Lachey of 98 Degrees participate in the Sam's Adams Stein Hoisting Championship at Oktoberfest Zinzinnati 2014.

Oktoberfest Zinzinnati is an annual German-heritage festival in the city of Cincinnati, Ohio. Based on the original Munich Oktoberfest, it is billed as the largest Oktoberfest celebration in the United States. First held in 1976, as of 2024 it hosted over 800,000 attendees each year. The 2024 festival was held at Sawyer Point Park and Yeatman's Cove along the Ohio River.

== Location and length ==
For many years, the festival was held on 5th Street. In 2016, the festival moved to 3rd Street to avoid intersecting the route of the newly constructed Cincinnati Streetcar. In 2021, it expanded to four days. In 2023, it moved to a new location on 5th Street, stretching between Main Street and Lytle Park. In 2024, the festival moved to Sawyer Point Park and Yeatman's Cove along Cincinnati's riverfront to allow for expanded space and more entertainment. The new location also features a tent seating over 1,000 people, akin to the Oktoberfest in Munich.

== Events ==
Oktoberfest Zinzinnati claimed the world record for the largest Chicken Dance in 1994, with over 48,000 participants.

The festival includes the World Brat Eating Championship and also the Running of the Wieners, in which dachshunds and dachshund mixes ("wiener dogs") race in 75-foot heats, wearing hot dog costumes.

== COVID-19 ==
In 2020, because of the COVID-19 pandemic, concerts were virtual instead of live. In both 2020 and 2021, Oktoberfest Zinzinnati was recognized as the world's largest Oktoberfest because Munich's Oktoberfest was canceled due to the COVID-19 pandemic two years in a row.

== Other Greater Cincinnati Oktoberfests ==
Cincinnati has a large percentage of the population with some German ancestry, and there are multiple Oktoberfests held in and around the downtown area as well as outlying suburbs.

Cincinnati's Germania Society has held an Oktoberfest since 1971. The Donauschwaben Society also holds an Oktoberfest.

Covington, Kentucky, directly across the Ohio River from downtown Cincinnati and considered part of Greater Cincinnati, has since 1979 held an Oktoberfest in its Mainstrasse Village. Newport, Kentucky, also directly across the river from Cincinnati, holds an annual Oktoberfest.

== See also ==
- Oktoberfest celebrations
- German Americans
- History of Cincinnati
- The Wienerschnitzel Wiener Nationals
