= Wok with Yan =

Canadian TV cooking show

- Genre: Cooking show
- Starring: Stephen Yan
- Country of origin: Canada
- Original language: English

Original release
- Network: BCTV (1978–1980); CBC (1980–1995)
- Release: 1978 – 1995

Wok with Yan is a Chinese cuisine cooking show starring Stephen Yan. The show was first produced in Vancouver, British Columbia by CTV affiliate BCTV as a weekly show, Yan's Woking, for two seasons before moving to CBC in 1980 as a daily show, Wok with Yan The show was also sold into syndication, with new episodes being produced until 1995. Wok with Yan was co-produced by Carleton Productions in Ottawa, which had previously produced The Galloping Gourmet and Celebrity Cooks, and Stephen Yan Productions, and was taped at CJOH's studios in Ottawa for two seasons before moving production to CBC Vancouver.

== Format ==
A running gag featured on the show was Yan's wearing of an apron featuring a different pun on the word "wok." Some examples are:

- Wok & Roll
- Wokking My Baby Back Home
- Danger, Yan at Wok
- Wok Around the Clock
- Wok the Heck
- You Are Wok You Eat
- Wok Goes Up Must Come Down
- Wok's New, Pussycat?
- Wokkey Night in Canada
- Stuck Between a Wok and a Hard Place
- Raiders of The Lost Wok
- Eat Your Wok Out
- Moon Wok
- Wok Your Butts Off
- Jailhouse Wok
- Superior Wokmanship
- Wok-A-Doodle-Doo
- Wok Before You Run
- Wok Me Amadeus
- Wok up Little Susie
- Wok Don't Run
- Don't Wok The Boat
- 101 Ways to Wok the Dog

The humorous aprons also complemented his humour that consisted of spontaneous one-liners spoken with his trademark Cantonese accent or him playing with his food or cookware. That, combined with his energetic personality, endeared him to Canadian viewers. Prior to him preparing his stir fry cuisine, the show usually featured a vignette of Yan travelling to different vacation spots from around the world (e.g., Thailand). He always invited an audience member to come up and eat with him near the end of each episode (there was a ticket draw in the studio audience to sit with him), and had a fortune cookie reading before the meal (first done in Cantonese, then translated in English).

Later sources have occasionally confused the show with Yan Can Cook, an American series hosted by Martin Yan (no relation) which also aired during the 1980s, but which originated in Canada as Yan Can. Martin Yan worked for Stephen Yan for a year in the 1970s as was trained by Stephen Yan as one of his 'Flying Squad' of six chefs who flew across Canada to do demonstrations in Chinese cooking at major events such as the Calgary Stampede and Edmonton's Klondike Days as well as in department stores.
