= Shane MacDougall =

Canadian comedian

Shane MacDougall is a Canadian stand-up comedian, former columnist, television writer, hacker, and documentarian. Best known for his 1999 challenge to Queen Elizabeth II to a kickboxing match or math test for the monarchy of Canada, the challenge resulted in him receiving death threats but also brought much media attention to the burgeoning Canadian republican movement.

He is also known for The Dark Show, which in the late 1990s was Canada's longest running independent comedy show. Held at Toronto's famous Rivoli club, The Dark Show featured some of Canada's top comedians doing material on topics from school shootings to date rape, and also generated protests from some citizens.

From 1999 to 2000, he was a comedy reporter and humorist for Eye Weekly in Toronto, then in 2000 moved to New York City, where he worked as a writer for various MTV shows.

In 2005, MacDougall completed filming on a documentary entitled "Wiener Takes All", which followed the competitive dachshund racing circuit. The documentary is currently traveling the festival circuit, screening at such venues as the San Francisco Documentary Film Festival, BendFilm Festival, the Laguna Beach Film Society/Museum of Art, and the Oklahoma City Museum of Art.

In 2011 and 2012, MacDougall won two Black Badges at the DEF CON becoming the first hacker to win twice in the social engineering competition.

In March, 2015, MacDougall filed an SEC whistleblower complaint against Intuit, alleging the company was knowingly enabling and profiting from tax fraud.
