= Barbecue America =

2003–2009 American TV series

- Presented by: Rick Browne
- Country of origin: United States

Production
- Running time: 30 minutes

Original release
- Network: PBS
- Release: 2003 – 2009

Barbecue America is a cooking show on American public television that ran from 2003 to 2009.

In this show, host and series creator Rick Browne, made everything on a grill. He wore a "tablecloth" shirt, actually made from a red and white checked tablecloth. The show was described as a "travelogue" program, in which Browne traveled to a variety of barbecue cook-offs, and exotic locales.

In 2004 Browne filed a lawsuit alleging that the Food Network had first rejected his proposal for this series, then used the idea for its own similar series starring Bobby Flay. (Some years later Browne appeared on the Food Network in an episode of Chopped Grill Masters.)

Browne has also published several cookbooks on the subject of grilling.
