= Daisy Cooks! =

Cooking show on PBS

Daisy Cooks! is a half-hour cooking show on PBS starring Daisy Martinez which features Spanish-Caribbean, Puerto Rican, and Mexican cuisine and their preparation.

== Episodes ==
(cf. sample show listings)

1. Dad's Firehouse Dinner
2. Mexico Magico
3. A Trip to Cuba
4. World of Latin Seafood
5. Fast & Fresh I: Grandma's Pork Chops
6. Empanadas
7. Tapas
8. ---
9. Lunch at the Beach
10. ---
11. One Pot Meal (Caldo Gallego)
12. Mexican Classics
13. Cocktail Party
14. Pasta Latino
15. Media Hora 2
16. Spanish Classics (chicken & Figs)
17. Sweet Endings
18. Fast & Fresh 2 - Swordfish
19. Paella
20. In Praise of Beans
21. Praise Of El Pollo
22. Christmas Eve At Daisy's
23. Partytime
24. Dominican Specialties
25. Feast Day In Puerto Rico
26. That's Dookie
