= Iron Chef Vietnam =

Vietnamese cooking competition show

- Genre: Cooking, Game show
- Directed by: Nguyễn Nam
- Presented by: Bình Minh (host in season 1); Chi Bảo (host in season 2)
- Starring: Nguyên Khang (commentator); Thanh Tùng (commentator)
- Judges: Phan Tôn Tịnh Hải; Dương Huy Khải
- Composer: MIDI
- Country of origin: Vietnam
- Original language: Vietnamese
- No. of seasons: 2
- No. of episodes: 32

Production
- Executive producer: Lê Hạnh
- Producers: Nguyễn Thanh Duyên; Nguyễn Kim Anh; Thúy Vy Victoria; Hoàng Công Cường; Lương Đức Anh; Nguyễn Hà Nam; Lại Văn Sâm
- Production locations: Ho Chi Minh City, Vietnam
- Camera setup: Multi-camera
- Running time: 45 minutes (excluding commercials)
- Production companies: Vietnam Television; TVPlus

Original release
- Network: VTV3
- Release: May 6, 2012 – September 22, 2013

Related
- The Next Iron Chef Vietnam

Iron Chef Vietnam (Vietnamese: Siêu Đầu Bếp Việt Nam) is a Vietnamese cooking show based on the Japanese show Iron Chef, as well as its American adaptation Iron Chef America and The Next Iron Chef. The program is a sort of culinary game show, with each episode seeing a challenger chef competing against one of the resident "Iron Chefs" in a one-hour cooking competition using a theme ingredient.

The show was put into production by the Vietnam Television mainly to rival to MasterChef Vietnam currently in pre-production. The show is produced mainly by TV Plus with support of Vietnam Television. It is initially scheduled to premiere on Sunday April 22, 2012 at 11:00AM slot on VTV3, but delayed to May 6 at the same slot. Expectedly, Martin Yan joined the set and showed some cooking tips.

== Overview ==
Iron Chef Vietnam features production design and presentation similar to Iron Chef America. The challenger is introduced at the beginning of the show and selects an Iron Chef to compete against. The battle takes place in the studio kitchen arena. Each chef is assisted by two sous chefs. Each chef must complete five dishes in one hour featuring a theme ingredient that is only revealed just before the battle begins. The show features commentary throughout the event, with frequent interviews with the chefs and judges at several points in each battle. Once the battle has concluded, the judging panel tastes and delivers their critique of the food, and score the chefs based on taste, presentation and creativity.

As some challengers (and some Iron Chefs) do not speak fluent Vietnamese, their voices are dubbed. Most of the non-Vietnamese-speaking challengers speak in English (although this may also not be their native language).

Similar to the Australian counterpart, the show features a static judging panel composed of food critics Chef Dương Huy Khải, cuisine expert Phan Tôn Tịnh Hải and a guest celebrity each week. The programme is hosted by former male model Bình Minh, with additional commentary provided by Nguyên Khang and Thanh Tùng. Martin Yan (from Yan Can Cook), former model Thúy Hạnh, director Lê Hoàng, Miss Hùng Temple Giáng My, food critics Võ Quốc, designer Mai Lâm, Miss Kim Oanh, etc. are notable guest judges each week.

== The Iron Chefs ==
=== Season 1 ===
Iron Chef	Specialty	Win	Loss	Draw	Total	Win %
David Thái	French / Western	5	-	1	6	83.3%
Nguyễn Minh Hải	Japanese	4	1	-	5	80.0%
Đỗ Quang Long ("Long Chef")	Vietnamese	6	1	-	7	85.7%
Vincent Tan	Western / Fusion	1	-	2	3	33.3%
Yu Zhi Da ("Dư Chí Đạt")	Chinese	6	-	-	6	100%

=== Season 2 ===
Iron Chef	Specialty	Win	Loss	Draw	Total	Win %
Lê Xuân Tâm	European	1	-	-	1	100%
Sakal Phoeung	French	1	-	-	1	100%
Alain Nguyễn Trọng Nghĩa	Vietnamese	-	1	-	1	0%
Nguyễn Vǎn Tú	Asian Modern	1	-	-	1	100%
Michael Bảo Huỳnh	Western / Vietnamese	-	1	-	1	0%

== Results ==
=== Season 1: 2012 ===
Episode (Date)	Details	Result (score)	Guest judge(s)
1 May 06, 2012	Iron Chef: Chef David Thái; Challenger: Fernando Olivares; Theme ingredient(s): Australian beef	Iron Chef 49; Challenger 45	Chef Martin Yan
2 May 13, 2012	Iron Chef: Đỗ Quang Long; Challenger: Đỗ Bá Thiện; Theme ingredient(s): Eel	Iron Chef 51.2; Challenger 47.1	Chef Martin Yan
3 May 20, 2012	Iron Chef: Yu Zhi Da; Challenger: Ngụy Tiểu Bình (Wei Xiaoping); Theme ingredient(s): Duck	Iron Chef 50.5; Challenger 45.5	Chef Martin Yan
4 May 27, 2012	Iron Chef: Đỗ Quang Long; Challenger: Nguyễn Thanh Tùng; Theme ingredient(s): Gấc fruit	Iron Chef 49.7; Challenger 50.4	Chef Martin Yan
5 June 03, 2012	Iron Chef: David Thái; Challenger: Trần Quang Hiền; Theme ingredient(s): Cobia	Iron Chef 49.6; Challenger 43.6	MC Thanh Bạch
6 June 10, 2012	Iron Chef: Nguyễn Minh Hải; Challenger: Trần Thanh Thảo; Theme ingredient(s): Japanese swamp eel	Iron Chef 41.8; Challenger 38.4	Trần Nguyễn Thiên Hương
7 June 17, 2012	Iron Chef: Yu Zhi Da; Challenger: Donald Berger; Theme ingredient(s): Lobster	Iron Chef 47.6; Challenger 46.1	Chu Thị Hồng Anh
8 July 01, 2012	Iron Chef: Vincent Tan; Challenger: Hoàng Thúy Vinh; Theme ingredient(s): Asian green mussel	Iron Chef 51.2; Challenger 43.6	Chu Thị Hồng Anh
9 July 08, 2012	Iron Chef: Đỗ Quang Long; Challenger: actress Kim Thư; Theme ingredient(s): Pork	Iron Chef 51.2; Challenger 46.8	Singer Nhật Hạ
10; July 15, 2012	Iron Chef: David Thái; Challenger: Nguyễn Văn Tú; Theme ingredient(s): Oyster	tied at 49.2 both declared winner	Food critics Võ Quốc
11; July 22, 2012	Iron Chef: Yu Zhi Da; Challenger: Frédérique Phương Nguyên; Theme ingredient(s): Giant river prawn	Iron Chef 54; Challenger 39	Model Thúy Hạnh
12; July 29, 2012	Iron Chef: Đỗ Quang Long; Challenger: Phan Văn Tĩnh; Theme ingredient(s): Asian redtail catfish	Iron Chef 47; Challenger 46	Trần Nguyễn Thiên Hương
13; August 05, 2012	Iron Chef: Yu Zhi Da; Challenger: Nguyễn Hoàng Phúc; Theme ingredient(s): Coconut	Iron Chef 49.3; Challenger 45	Miss Kim Oanh
14; August 12, 2012	Iron Chef: Nguyễn Minh Hải; Challenger: Phạm Văn Thực; Theme ingredient(s): Squid	Iron Chef 48.4; Challenger 38.0	Model Thúy Hạnh
15; August 19, 2012	Iron Chef: David Thái; Challenger: Ahmad Azaharuddin Bin Omar; Theme ingredient(s): genus Capsicum	Iron Chef 56.0; Challenger 45.2	Designer Mai Lâm
16; August 26, 2012	Iron Chef: Vincent Tan; Challenger: Peter Lester; Theme ingredient(s): Norwegian salmon	tied at 54.4 both declared winner	Trần Nguyễn Thiên Hương
17; September 02, 2012	Iron Chef: Yu Zhi Da; Challenger: Trần Thanh Quang; Theme ingredient(s): Chicken egg	Iron Chef 50.8; Challenger 43.6	MC Thanh Bạch
18; September 09, 2012	Iron Chef: Nguyễn Minh Hải; Challenger: Bùi Văn Bôn; Theme ingredient(s): Gobio gobio	Iron Chef 45.0; Challenger 33.2	Designer Mai Lâm
19; September 16, 2012	Iron Chef: Đỗ Quang Long; Challenger: Trần Văn Giảng; Theme ingredient(s): Phở noodles	Iron Chef 54.3; Challenger 37.6	Food critics Võ Quốc
20; September 23, 2012	Iron Chef: Nguyễn Minh Hải; Challenger: Trần Hồ Nhựt Linh; Theme ingredient(s): Tuna	Iron Chef 44.6; Challenger 47.4	Miss Kim Oanh
21; September 30, 2012	Iron Chef: David Thái; Challenger: Trương Thu Liễu; Theme ingredient(s): Durian	Iron Chef 48.4; Challenger 42.8	Lê Hoàng
22; October 07, 2012	Iron Chef: Yu Zhi Da; Challenger: Nguyễn Mạnh Hùng; Theme ingredient(s): Acipenser	Iron Chef 51.6; Challenger 38.8	Trần Nguyễn Thiên Hương
23; October 14, 2012	Iron Chef: Đỗ Quang Long; Challenger: Võ Thanh Long; Theme ingredient(s): Ninh Thuan goat	Iron Chef 48.6; Challenger 43.6	Lê Hoàng
24; October 21, 2012	Iron Chef: David Thai; Challenger: Hà Hải Đoàn; Theme ingredient(s): Basa fish	Iron Chef 52.8; Challenger 40.8	Nhật Hạ
25; October 28, 2012	Iron Chef: Nguyễn Minh Hải; Challenger: Nguyễn Thanh Sơn; Theme ingredient(s): Scallop,	Iron Chef 43.6; Challenger 39.9	Food critics Võ Quốc
26; November 04, 2012	Iron Chef: Đỗ Quang Long; Challenger: Ngô Hoàng Tú; Theme ingredient(s): Cochin	Iron Chef 55.0; Challenger 34.0	Giáng My
27; November 11, 2012	Iron Chef: Vincent Tan; Challenger: Panumas Chaisalee; Theme ingredient(s): Sea crab	tied at 50.7 both declared winner	Giáng My

=== Season 2: 2013 ===
Episode (Date)	Details	Result (score)	Guest judge(s)
1 March 17, 2013	Iron Chef: Lê Xuân Tâm; Challenger: Phan Văn Tĩnh; Theme ingredient(s):	Iron Chef 243.4; Challenger 202	
2 March 24, 2013	Iron Chef: Nguyễn Vǎn Tú; Challenger: Gilbert Saez; Theme ingredient(s):	Iron Chef 220.1; Challenger 203	
3 March 31, 2013	Iron Chef: Alain Nguyễn Trọng Nghĩa; Challenger: Nguyễn Văn Lập; Theme ingredient(s):	Iron Chef 200.9; Challenger 205.3	Chef David Thái; Dúóng Khái; Lý Sanh
4 April 7, 2013	Iron Chef: Micheal Bảo Huýnh; Challenger: Bailey Camilla; Theme ingredient(s): Potato	Iron Chef 188.2; Challenger 229.2	Chef David Thái; Dúóng Khái
5 April 14, 2013	Iron Chef: Sakal Phoeung; Challenger: Phạm Văn Trang; Theme ingredient(s): Vegetables	Iron Chef 234.5; Challenger 210.6	
6 April 21, 2013	Iron Chef Vietnam: Alain Nguyễn Trọng Nghĩa; Iron Chef Thailand: Pom (Tanarak Chuuto); Theme ingredient(s): Alligator	Iron Chef Vietnam 330.9; Iron Chef Thailand 296.5	

== The Next Iron Chef Vietnam ==
The Next Iron Chef Vietnam was a spinoff just like Iron Chef America. It premiered on November 18, 2012, a week after Iron Chef Vietnam ended the series.
