= Rasoi Show =

- Created by: Archana Shah
- Written by: Mittal shah Deepika Khuman
- Directed by: Kiran Suthar
- Presented by: Mittal Shah
- Country of origin: India
- Original language: Gujarati
- No. of episodes: 6000

Production
- Producer: Suhas Jahagirdar
- Production locations: Ahmedabad, Gujarat, India
- Cinematography: Mukesh Sharma
- Editors: R. Patel; Jayesh Pancholi
- Camera setup: Multi-camera

Original release
- Network: Colors Gujarati
- Release: 25 October 2004 – present

Rasoi Show (transl. Cooking Show) is the longest running Indian television cookery show broadcast on Colors Gujarati channel since 25 October 2004. The show currently holds the record for being the cooking-show which has aired the second most number of episodes, trailing only the Mexican series Hasta La Cocina. The show is currently hosted by Mittal Shah and Hely Panchal. The series is one of the longest running shows in India as well as Asia. In 2023, the show successfully completed 6,000 episodes.

== Format ==
The show invites guests from across the Indian state of Gujarat, who show the viewers how to prepare their invented dishes; as well as how already existing dishes could be made more tastier, healthier, and cheaper to produce. The guests, which are celebrities or volunteers, create not only Indian food, but cuisines from all over the world. Special dishes are prepared to suit festivals such as Diwali, Holi, Eid and Christmas.
