= Wiener Nationals =

American Dachshund racing event

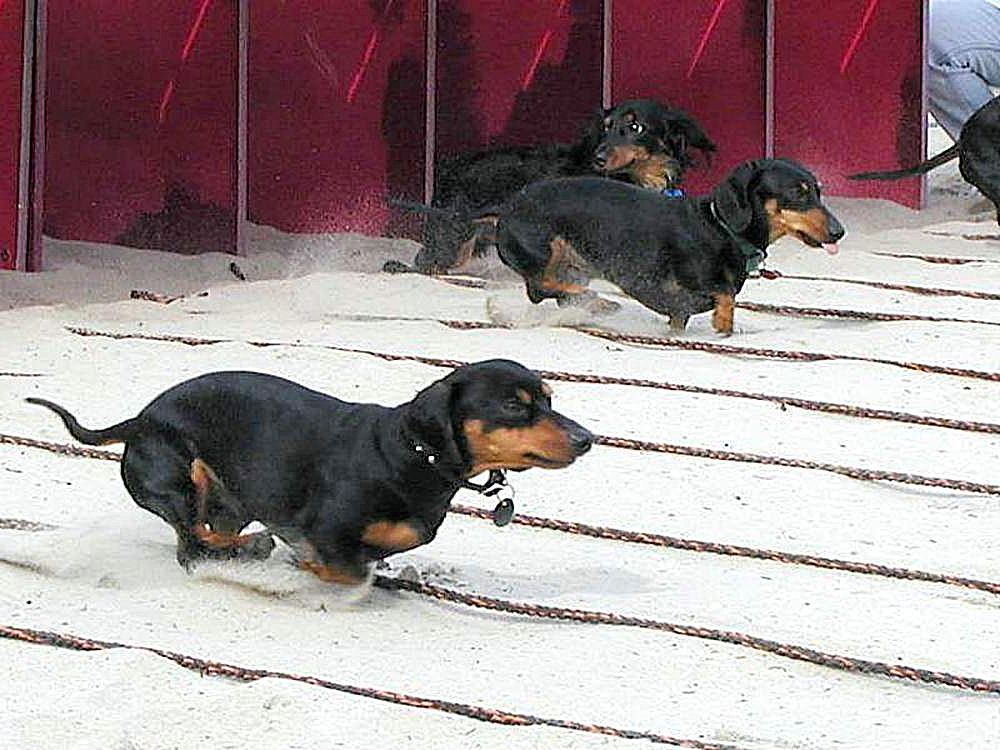
- Dachshunds sprinting out of the starting gate
- Venue: Los Alamitos Race Course
- Locations: Cypress, California
- Inaugurated: 1996
- Website: www.losalamitos.com/wienernationals/wdefault.aspx

The Wienerschnitzel Wiener Nationals is a dachshund racing event held at the Los Alamitos Race Course in Cypress, California. A fundraiser for the Seal Beach Animal Care Center, the event has been held annually since 1996.

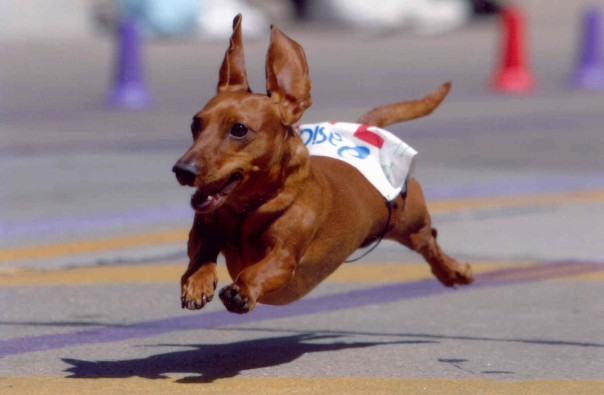
Dachshund mid-race, wind in his ears

== Rules ==
The Wienerschnitzel Wiener Nationals is a racing event where dachshunds compete to be the fastest dog and for a cash prize. The dachshunds start from a gate and run approximately fifty yards to their owners, who are usually enticing them with a ball or treat. The race focuses on the dog's ability to remain within the boundaries of the racing lane while maintaining speed.

Regional qualifiers from Texas, California, and other southwestern states come together at Los Alamitos Race Course in California to race in the "Holiday Bowl" and participate annually in the Holiday Bowl Parade, a yearly event focused on the Holiday Bowl Football Game. With an average attendance of 15,000 people, the tournament has raised more than $250,000 for its beneficiary, the Seal Beach Animal Care Center, which provides shelter for homeless animals in Seal Beach, California.

== Notable racers ==
- “Baby Bo” is the winner of the 22nd annual Wiener Nationals with a time of 7:05. He qualified for finals with a time of 5:80, which is believed to be the fastest in Wiener Nationals History.
- “Lady Bug” was once paralyzed in her hind legs, but after recovery, she was able to race in the 2017 Wiener Nationals. Lady Bug was adopted by Dr. Deanna O’Neil, a veterinarian of the Dachshund Rescue of Los Angeles who treated Lady Bug's paralysis. Lady Bug was put through physical therapy and a recovery schedule that included a treadmill and acupuncture.

== Winners ==
Year	Winner	Time	Trainer
2005	Heidi Roo	6.10	Stacy Smith
2006	Princess Smoochy Gucci	6.40	Jill Jansen
2007	Sally	7.01	Delaney Schroeder
2008	Max	7.00	Haley Harland
2009	Presley	6.80	Amy Caetta
2010	Penny Lane	7.80	Trish Ausilio
2011	Penny Lane	7.50	Trish Ausilio
2012	Mr. Schnitzel	7.90	Luis & Lois Hernandez
2013	Buddy Black	8.00	David & Shawn Black
2014	Mr. Schnitzel	7.70	Luis & Lois Hernandez
2015	Finn	7.80	Josh & Brittany Snook
2016	Darcy	6.80	Julie Woods

== History ==
During the 27th annual event in 2023, the event had a total of 124 dogs, which was a record amount of competitors. The winning dog was named "Fastest Wiener in the West."

== In other media ==
5 Wiener Nationals competitors are featured in 2007 documentary film Wiener Takes All: A Dogumentary.

Wiener Dog Nationals: a movie made about the races

== See also ==
- Oktoberfest Zinzinnati, includes the Running of the Wieners
- Greyhound racing
