= Hippy Gourmet =

American television series

The Hippy Gourmet TV Show logo

The Hippy Gourmet TV Show is a United States Public Television Series that airs nationally on Public Broadcasting Service (PBS) and public-access television cable stations. The show is based in the Haight-Ashbury area of San Francisco, but travels the world highlighting organic, sustainable agriculture, alternative energy and people making a difference for a better world. The series is known for its use of instrumental jam-band music from such bands as Transcendental Hayride and Rek.

== The History of the TV show ==
The Hippy Gourmet began as a pilot filmed at Burning Man in the Fall of 2000. The show stars Bruce Brennan, a one time flower child and classically trained gourmet chef, who came out to the San Francisco area during the 1967 Summer of Love. The Hippy Gourmet as a weekly television show was the idea of James Ehrlich, the producer and director, who creates each episode using an Apple Macintosh computer running Final Cut Pro editing software.

=== The Birth of a Weekly TV series ===
The series began in earnest in the fall of 2001, filming every week from the restored Victorian style home and kitchen of The Herb'n Inn, a bed and breakfast in the Haight-Ashbury of San Francisco owned and operated by Bruce's sister, Pam Brennan. The show started airing on San Francisco Public-access television and later spread to fourteen other Public-access television stations from Novato, California to Los Gatos, California and ultimately into fifty-four Public-access television stations around the United States.

=== Going national on PBS ===
In 2004, The Hippy Gourmet TV Show picked up the affiliation of public television station KRCB in Rohnert Park, California, enabling the series to begin satellite distribution efforts to public television stations across the United States. Currently, the show is seen in over one hundred public television stations nationally.

== Media that Matters ==
The show's "hippie" character is reflected in segments featuring non-profit organizations and individuals working in sustainable agriculture, organic and fair trade markets, alternative energy, and habitat and wildlife preservation. Organizations featured on the show have included the Performing Animal Welfare Society (PAWS), a wild animal sanctuary; the Solar Living Institute in Hopland, California, which promotes solar and wind power; the Monterey Bay Aquarium; the Buckminster Fuller Institute; and the National Audubon Society.

=== Family-Style Recipes ===
The cooking show highlights recipes that are healthy, prepared with organic ingredients and made to feed families and groups of friends for the week ahead. The series encourages people of all ages to join together in the kitchen, demonstrating how easy and fun it is to share the experience of making delicious foods. Every episode is created to remind people about the cycle of life by shifting their awareness on where each ingredient comes from.

=== Focus on Sustainability ===
The Hippy Gourmet features different aspects on leading a green lifestyle. Filming segments on Solar Cookers, Habitat and wildlife preservation, Hemp food and clothing and people who are inventing solutions to global environmental issues. The Hippy Gourmet is one of the first media entities in North America to offer a Hemp DVD case, made from Hemp fiber and Hemp oil.

== The Hippy Gourmet Travels ==
The Hippy Gourmet travels around the globe, from the rain forests of the Brazilian Amazon to Amsterdam in the Netherlands, all over Tuscany, Sardinia, Hawaii and around the United States and Canada, including a recent visit to Vancouver and Vancouver Island, British Columbia. The focus is on indigenous cultures, traditions and recipes from everywhere the show visits, discovering the roots of organic, sustainable, regional and home-style cooking around the world.

== Bibliography ==
- The Hippy Gourmet's Quick and Simple Cookbook for Healthy Eating (2007)
