= Greatest Dishes in the World =

British television programme

Greatest Dishes In The World is a British five-part cooking based television programme from 2005 presented by Naomi Cleaver. Each week some of Britain's best chefs prepare what they consider to be the best dishes in the world. At the end of the programme restaurant critics judge each dish and decide which is the best. By the end of the series each dish will make up the 'Greatest Menu in the World'.

It was originally shown on Sky1.
