= Yan Can Cook =

American food reality television series

- Genre: Cooking show
- Starring: Martin Yan
- Countries of origin: Canada, United States
- Original language: English
- No. of episodes: 3,500+

Production
- Executive producer: Gayle Yamada
- Producer: Mark Tocher

Original release
- Network: CFAC-TV, PBS
- Release: 1978

Related
- Martin Yan – Quick & Easy

Yan Can Cook is a Chinese-oriented cooking show starring Chef Martin Yan that featured recipes for stir fried foods and an assortment of various other traditional Chinese meals and cooking techniques. The series originated in Calgary, Alberta, Canada (CFAC-TV), from 1978 to 1982 as a daily syndicated cooking show, Yan Can, for 250 episodes until Yan moved to San Francisco, California, United States, in 1982 starting Yan Can Cook on PBS (KQED). Yan also wrote several cookbooks which serve as companions to these various television series.

== Presentation style ==
Chef Yan's style of presentation was infused with (and today continues to feature) humor using witticism, and international or local cultural references. During this program's original run he became known for his main catchphrase, "If Yan can cook, so can you, zai jian (goodbye in Mandarin Chinese)/zoi gin (goodbye in Cantonese)!", with which he signed off on each show. He used a second catchphrase, "Something fishy here! [sic]", used whenever he cooked seafood. One of his other trademarks was to chop food frantically making music with a sharp cleaver while grinning toward the camera and audience. This show is shot on stage.

== See also ==
- Wok with Yan, a Canadian Chinese cooking television series starring Stephen Yan, for whom Martin Yan once worked
