= Constance Spry =

British florist and educator

Constance Spry OBE
- Spry arranging flowers
- Born: Constance Fletcher; 5 December 1886; Derby, England
- Died: 3 January 1960 (aged 73); Winkfield, Berkshire, England
- Other name: Constance Marr
- Occupations: Educator, florist, author
- Known for: Co-inventor of Coronation chicken
- Spouses: James Heppell Marr (m. 1910; div. 1917) Henry Ernest Spry (m. 1926)
- Children: 1

Constance Spry OBE (née Fletcher, previously Marr; 5 December 1886 – 3 January 1960) was a British educator, florist, cookbook writer, and author in the mid-20th century.

== Life ==
Constance Fletcher was born in Derby in 1886, the eldest child and only daughter of George and Henrietta Maria (née Dutton) Fletcher. After studying hygiene, physiology and district nursing in Ireland, she lectured on first aid and home care for the newly established Irish Women's National Health Association. She married James Heppell Marr in 1910 and moved to Coolbawn, near Castlecomer. In 1912, their son Anthony Heppel Marr was born.

World War I had a profound impact on Constance Marr, and the Fletcher family. After the beginning of the war in 1914, Constance Marr was appointed secretary of the Dublin Red Cross. In 1916, she left both Ireland and her husband, escaping a violent marriage, and moved to Barrow-in-Furness with her son Anthony to work as a welfare supervisor. In 1917, she joined the civil service as the head of women's staff (welfare and medical treatment) at the Ministry of Aircraft Production. The same year, two of her brothers – Lieutenant Arnold Lockhart Fletcher and Second Lieutenant Donald Lockhart Fletcher – were killed in action, on 30 and 28 April 1917 respectively. After these losses, her mother did not speak for two years.

In 1921, she was appointed headmistress of the Homerton and South Hackney Day Continuation School in Homerton, east London, where she instructed teenage factory workers in cookery and dressmaking, and later flower arranging. In 1926, she married her second husband, Henry Ernest Spry.

Spry gave up teaching in 1928, to open her first shop, "Flower Decoration", in 1929. After securing a regular order from Granada Cinemas, she caused a sensation in fashionable society by creating an exquisite arrangement of hedgerow flowers in the windows of Atkinsons, an Old Bond Street perfumery in the West End of London, as part of the decoration undertaken by the theatrical designer Norman Wilkinson. Spry ransacked attics for unusual objects to use as containers and drew inspiration from the Dutch 17th- and 18th-century flower painters, while she popularized unusual plant materials to offset flowers, like pussy willow, weeds and grasses and ornamental kale. The biographer Diana Souhami revealed the painter Gluck had a romantic relationship with Spry, whose work informed the artist's admired floral paintings.

When she opened a larger shop in South Audley Street in Mayfair in 1934, Spry was already employing seventy people. In the same year, she published her first book, Flower Decoration, and established the "Constance Spry Flower School" at her new premises. During this period she hired the Australian Patricia Easterbrook Roberts, who later opened the Roberts School of Dramatic Floriculture in Detroit, Michigan. In 2012 English Heritage marked Spry's tenure at 64 South Audley Street with a blue plaque.

Her company created the flower arrangements for two royal weddings: the November 1935 nuptials of the Duke of Gloucester to Lady Alice Christabel Montagu-Douglas-Scott, held in the private chapel of Buckingham Palace, and the more private wedding of the Duke and Duchess of Windsor in June 1937. Public interest from these commissions led to two tours of the US. Later, she arranged the flowers for the wedding of Princess Elizabeth and for that of Princess Margaret.

When World War II began in 1939, Spry resumed her teaching career and lectured to women all over Britain. In 1942, she published Come into The Garden, Cook, based around French cuisine, hoping to help the war effort by encouraging the British to grow and eat their own food. Her company continued to provide floral decorations at weddings.

In 1946, she opened a domestic science school with her friend, the accomplished Le Cordon Bleu cook Rosemary Hume, at Winkfield Place, at Cranbourne in Winkfield, Berkshire. Constance lived at Orchard Lea, across the road, and then over the stable block at the Place. In 1953, Spry was commissioned to arrange the flowers at Westminster Abbey and along the processional route from Buckingham Palace for the coronation of Queen Elizabeth II. The flowers were supplied as gifts by Commonwealth nations. The Le Cordon Bleu students at Winkfield were asked to cater a lunch for foreign delegates, for whom Hume and Spry invented a new dish – coronation chicken.

She was appointed an OBE in the 1953 Coronation Honours.

At Winkfield Place, Spry devoted years to the cultivation of particular varieties of antique roses, which she was instrumental in bringing back into fashion; David Austin's first rose introduction, in 1961, was named after her and is considered to be the foundation of his "English rose" series.

In 1956, she and Hume published the best-selling Constance Spry Cookery Book, thereby extending the Spry style from flowers to food. On 3 January 1960, she slipped on the stairs at Winkfield Place and died an hour later. Her last words were supposedly, "Someone else can arrange this".

== Legacy ==
Spry's books remained in print for many years after her death and her floristry business thrived until the early 2000s. Her influence in floristry remains strong; for example, luxury florist Nikki Pierce has cited her as an inspiration.

"Constance Spry: A Millionaire for a Few Pence" was an exhibition at the Design Museum in the autumn of 2004. The curator Libby Sellers called Spry "one of the lost heroes in the history of modernism" but the exhibition led to the resignation of the chair of trustees, James Dyson.

Shane Connolly, who designs flower arrangements for royal occasions as Spry had done, curated an exhibition in 2021 at the Garden Museum, London; this celebration of Spry's achievements and life made use of the extensive collection of her personal papers and records in the Royal Horticultural Society's Lindley Library.

== Bibliography ==
- Constance Spry, Flower Decoration. Dent, 1934
- Constance Spry, Flowers in House and Garden. Dent, 1937
- Constance Spry, Garden Notebook. Dent, 1940
- Constance Spry: Come into the Garden, Cook. Dent 1942
- Constance Spry, Summer and Autumn. Dent, 1951
- Constance Spry, Winter and Spring Flowers. Dent, 1951
- Constance Spry, How to do the Flowers, Dent, 1952, 1953
- Constance Spry, A Constance Spry Anthology. Dent, 1953
- Constance Spry, Party Flowers. Dent, 1955
- Constance Spry and Rosemary Hume, The Constance Spry Cookery Book. Dent, 1956
- Constance Spry, Simple Flowers 'A millionaire for a few pence'. Dent, 1957
- Constance Spry, Favourite Flowers, Dent. 1959
- Constance Spry and Rosemary Hume, Hostess. Dent, 1961
