= Rosemary Hume =

English cook and writer (1907–1984)

Rosemary Ethel Hume
- Born: 1907; Sevenoaks, England
- Died: 1984 (aged 76–77)
- Occupations: Chef, writer

Rosemary Ethel Hume MBE (1907 – 1984) was an English chef and writer. She taught at Le Cordon Bleu cookery school in London, and co-devised coronation chicken in 1953.

== Biography ==
Hume was born in 1907, in Sevenoaks. She was one of the first British people to be trained in Le Cordon Bleu in Paris. She was taught by Henri-Paul Pellaprat. She had not done well at school as the family moved around following her father, Colonel Charles Vernon Hume, who had worked in India and now worked in military intelligence. Hume showed an interest in cookery.

In 1931, she and Dione Lucas set up a cookery school in London as they had both trained in Paris. They had a flat in Chelsea and they would reputedly serve their students' creations to passing trade at chairs and tables on the pavement. Hume and Lucas opened l’Ecole du Petit Cordon Bleu in 1933. Rosemary Hume, the principal of the London Le Cordon Bleu school created Poulet Reine Elizabeth (later known as Coronation Chicken) for one of the coronation menus on 2 June 1953.

Dione Lucas is thought to have helped Hume create her first cookery book as her spelling was known to be poor. Rosemary was approached by Constance Spry with a proposal that they should create a cookbook together. Spry could write the book and Hume would supply the recipes. Constance was to provide personal reminiscences of her time in Ireland. Constance was twenty years older than Hume.

By 1953, Hume and Spry were both principals of the "Cordon Bleu" Cookery School in London. In celebration of the coronation of Elizabeth II they devised the recipe now known as "Coronation Chicken". The recipe has been in every edition of the Constance Spry Cookbook (by Spry and Hume) but the major credit should go to Rosemary Hume.

== Works ==
- 1956, Spry, Constance; Hume, Rosemary (2013) [1956]. Constance Spry Cookery Book. Grub Street. ISBN 978-1-909166-21-9.
