= Brassart =

Brassart may refer to:

- A brassard, an item of military dress or armor
- Johannes Brassart, a composer of the Renaissance
- Madame Brassart
