= Coronation quiche =

Tart for King Charles III's coronation

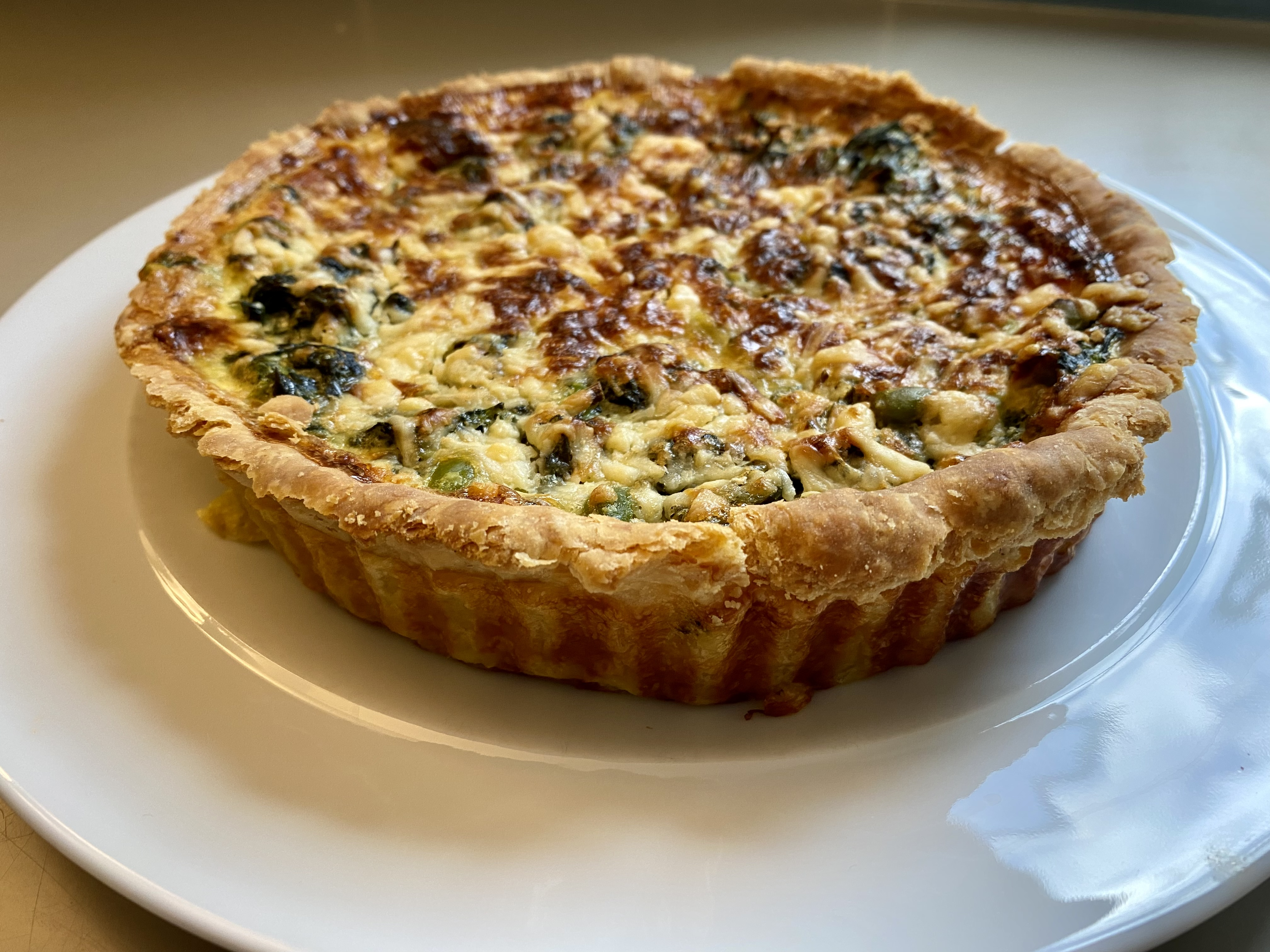
- A coronation quiche
- Course: Lunch
- Place of origin: United Kingdom
- Created by: Mark Flanagan
- Main ingredients: Eggs, herbs and cheese

The coronation quiche was chosen by King Charles III and Queen Camilla as the signature dish of their coronation celebrations in May 2023.

The official website of the British royal family described the quiche as a "deep quiche with a crisp, light pastry case and delicate flavours of spinach, broad beans and fresh tarragon" and stated that it could be eaten either hot or cold. It was designed to be eaten during a communal lunch during the celebrations of the coronation.

The dish was devised by the royal chef Mark Flanagan. It was chosen for its versatility as it can be eaten either hot or cold, is easy and cost-effective to make and can be easily adapted to suit various dietary requirements.

== Recipe ==
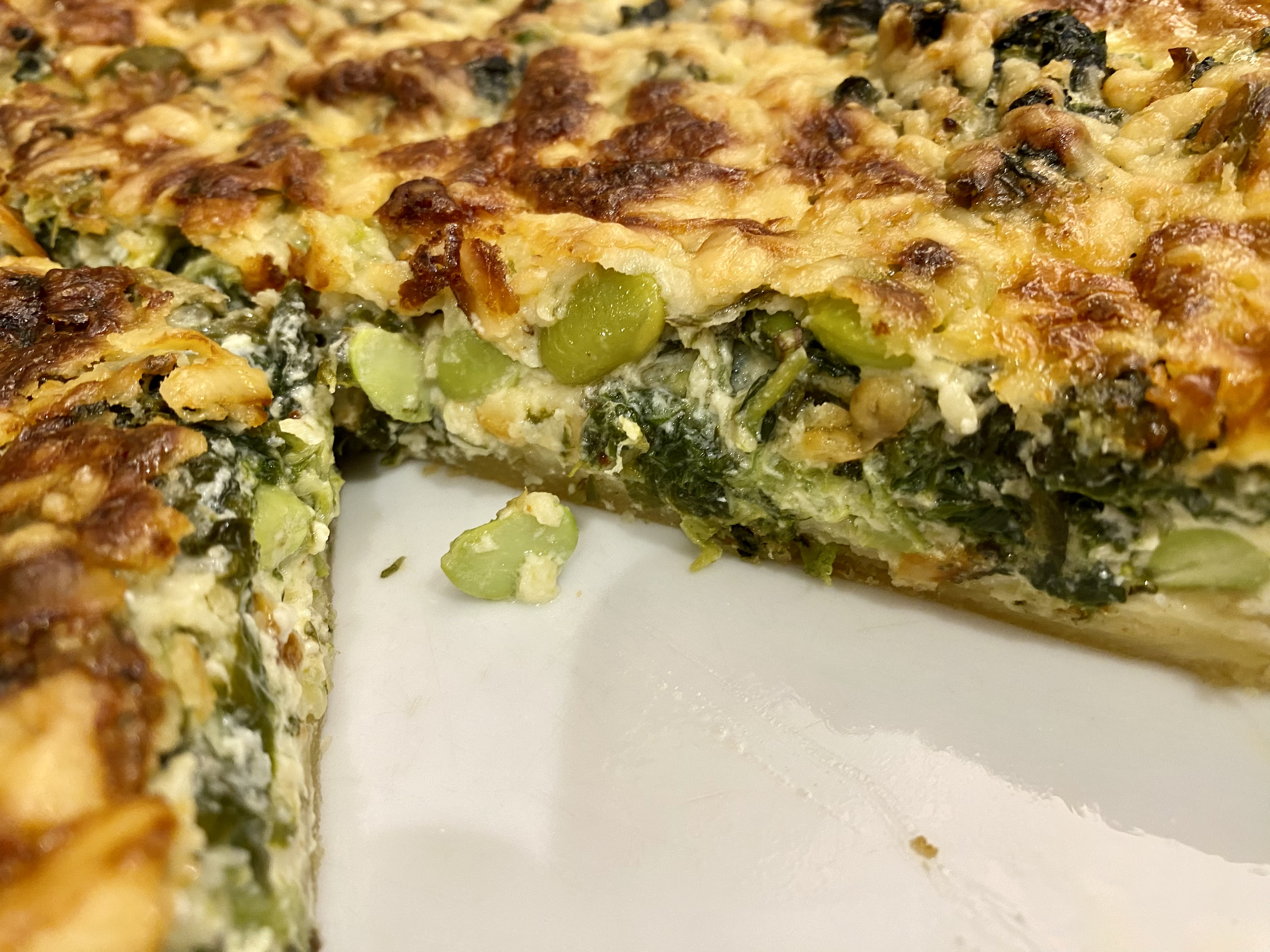
The filling of the quiche

The recipe serves six people. The pastry is composed of flour, salt, butter and milk; the filling also includes milk, as well as double cream, eggs, tarragon, salt, pepper, cheddar, spinach, and broad or soya beans.

Charles has previously expressed a fondness for egg dishes, especially scrambled eggs.

== Reception ==
Overall, reviewers found the quiche "surprisingly delicious" and scored an average of 9/10 by some tasters. However, Conservative MP Jacob Rees-Mogg called the dish "disgusting". Furthermore, broad beans are out of season in April (the month before Charles's coronation), and eggs were limited in 2023 due to bird flu, and buying ingredients could cost £14 during the 2020s cost of living crisis. Nevertheless, supermarkets experienced a significant increase in sales of quiche and party food in the run up to the coronation, and a £2.45 version of the quiche was available.

=== Coronation tart ===
While Buckingham Palace named the dish a quiche, Évelyne Muller-Dervaux, the French grand master of the Brotherhood of the Quiche Lorraine (Confrérie de la Quiche Lorraine), said, "I think I would call it a savoury tart." Laurent Miltgen-Delinchamp, member of the Brotherhood, said: "I think it would have anyway better reflected the British spirit if they had called it a tart." The Daily Telegraph reported on claims that the quiche should instead have been called a flan.

== See also ==
- Jubilee chicken
- Coronation chicken
- Victoria sponge
- Windsor soup
- Platinum Pudding
