= Coronation chicken =

English chicken dish

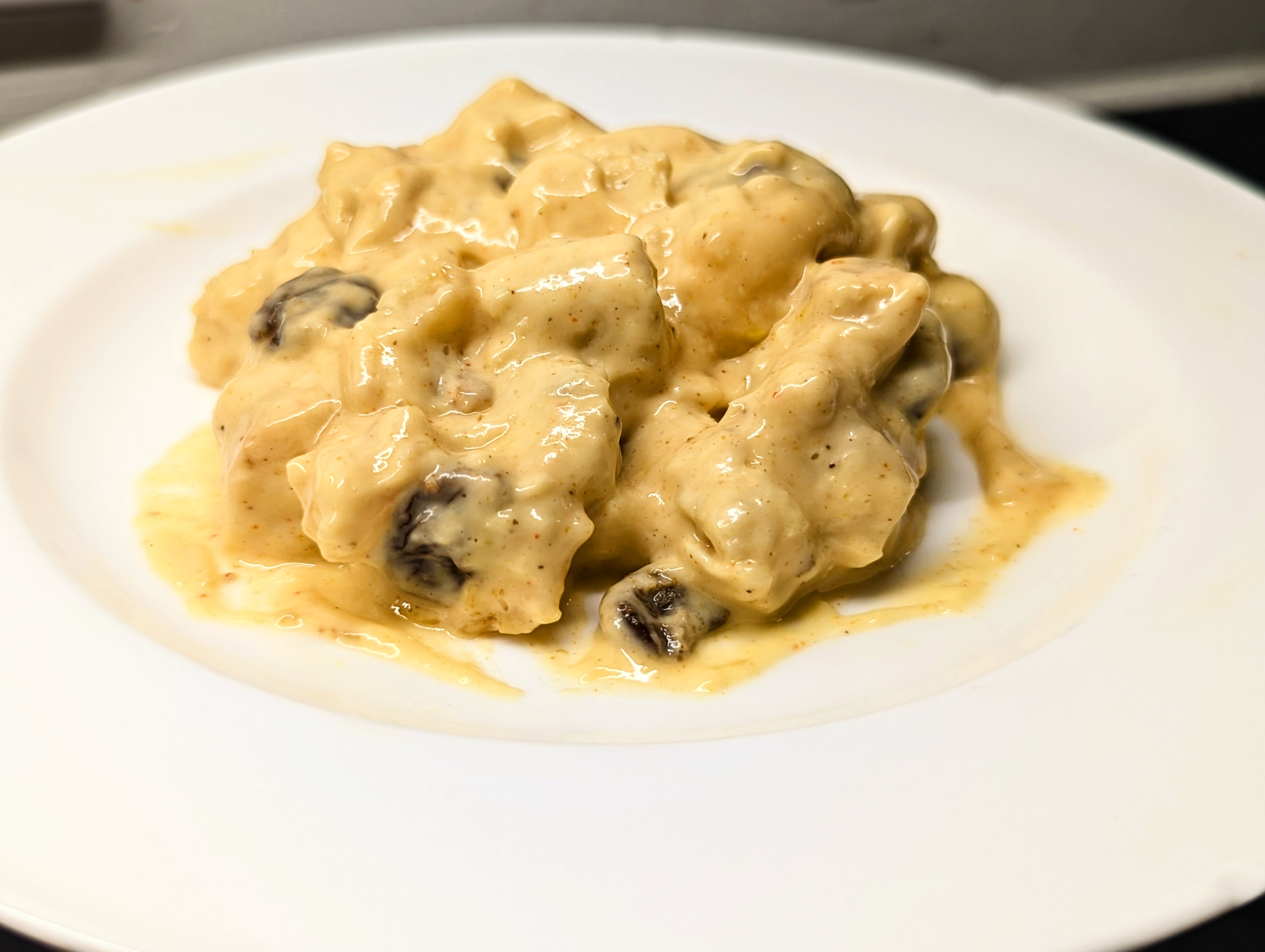
- Place of origin: United Kingdom
- Created by: Constance Spry and Rosemary Hume
- Main ingredients: Chicken, herbs and spices, cream or mayonnaise-based sauce

Coronation chicken or Poulet Reine Elizabeth is an English dish of boneless chicken traditionally seasoned with parsley, thyme, bay leaf, cumin, turmeric, ginger and peppercorns, mixed with cream or mayonnaise, and dried apricots (or sultanas). Some modern variations also incorporate cinnamon. It is served cold and eaten as a salad with rice, peas and pimentos, or used as a filling for sandwiches. It was created by Constance Spry, an English food writer and flower arranger, and Rosemary Hume, a chef, for the coronation of Queen Elizabeth II in 1953.

== Composition ==
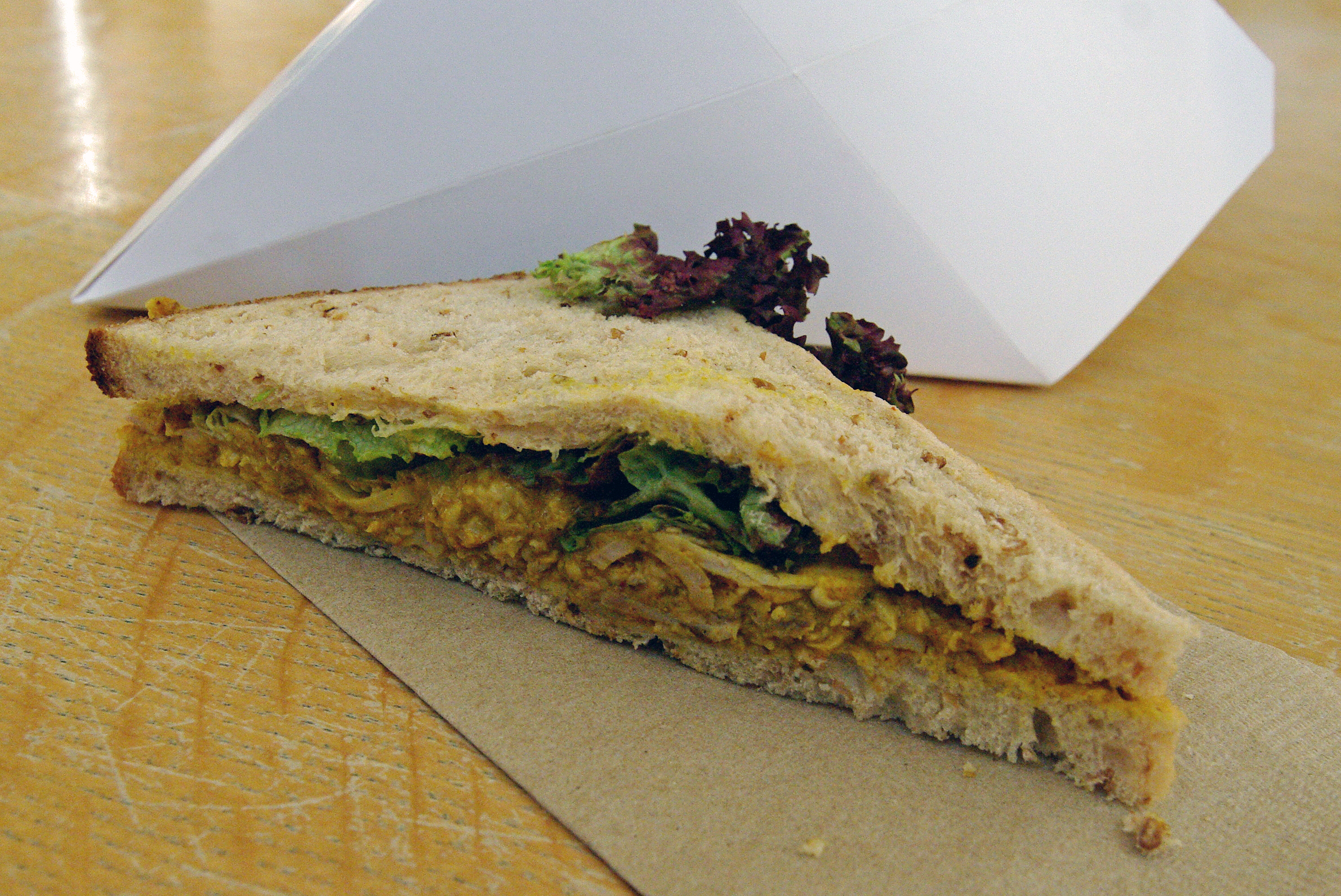
A prepacked sandwich

Normally bright yellow, coronation chicken is traditionally flavoured with curry powder and fresh or dried herbs and spices, but may include additional ingredients such as flaked or sliced almonds.

The original dish differs from modern versions in that it calls for apricot puree rather than raisins. The chicken is first poached in diluted, seasoned white wine, before being coated in a mayonnaise-based cream of curry sauce and arranged atop a rice salad.

== History ==
Constance Spry, an English food writer and flower arranger, and Rosemary Hume, a chef, both principals of the Cordon Bleu Cookery School in London, are credited with the invention of coronation chicken. Preparing the food for the banquet of the coronation of Queen Elizabeth II in 1953, Hume is credited with the recipe of cold chicken, curry cream sauce and dressing that became known as coronation chicken.

Coronation chicken is sometimes said, without evidence, to have been inspired by jubilee chicken, a dish supposedly prepared for the silver jubilee of George V in 1935, which mixed chicken with mayonnaise and curry. For the Queen's Golden Jubilee in 2002, another celebratory dish was devised, also called Jubilee chicken.

== See also ==
- Coronation quiche
- Platinum Pudding
- Chicken salad
- List of chicken dishes
