= Sarasota Herald-Tribune =

Daily newspaper in Sarasota, Florida

- Type: Daily newspaper
- Format: Broadsheet
- Owner: USA Today Co.
- General manager: Matthew Sauer
- Founded: 1925; 101 years ago
- Language: English
- Headquarters: 1777 Main Street
- City: Sarasota
- Country: United States
- Circulation: 24,424 daily; 28,472 Sunday; (as of 2022)
- Readership: 300,000 (2016)
- ISSN: 2641-4503
- OCLC number: 51645638
- Website: heraldtribune.com

The Sarasota Herald-Tribune is a daily newspaper, located in Sarasota, Florida, United States, founded in 1925 as the Sarasota Herald.

== History ==
The newspaper was owned by The New York Times Company from 1982 to 2012. It was then owned by Halifax Media Group from 2012 to 2015, when New Media Investment Group acquired Halifax.

The Herald-Tribune was one of the first newspapers in the nation to have an in-house 24-hour cable news channel. SNN was founded in February 1995 along with partner Comcast. SNN was later sold to private investors in January 2009.

The original former headquarters for the newspaper was added to the National Register of Historic Places and still exists, containing the Sarasota Woman's Exchange and several other small businesses; the 1969 replacement building torn down in 2010 to make room for a new Publix. The new headquarters building was designed by Arquitectonica and won the American Institute of Architect's Award of Excellence. In early 2017, the Herald-Tribune moved to new offices next door to its old headquarters on the fourth, fifth and ninth floors of 1777 Main Street.

In 2021, Jennifer Orsi was named executive editor.

== Awards and accolades ==
The newspaper has been a Pulitzer Prize winner or finalist four times, its first nomination having been in 2008.

On April 18, 2011, Herald-Tribune reporter Paige St. John won the Pulitzer Prize for investigative journalism for her series on Florida's insurance industry. This was the first Pulitzer in the Herald-Tribune's history, marking a "sustained commitment to excellence".

On April 18, 2016, Herald-Tribune reporter Michael Braga won the newspaper's second Pulitzer Prize for investigative journalism for a series in partnership with the Tampa Bay Times called "Insane. Invisible. In Danger" that detailed the horrific conditions in Florida's mental health hospitals.

On May 5, 2017, the newspaper won the Robert F. Kennedy Journalism Award for its "Bias on the Bench" investigative series, which found judges throughout Florida sentence black defendants to harsher punishments than whites charged with the same crimes under similar circumstances. That series previously won the American Society of News Editors' Batten Medal, which honors achievement in public service journalism, and was a finalist for ASNE's Dori J. Maynard Award for Diversity in Journalism. It also won the Society of Professional Journalists' national Sigma Delta Chi Award. "Bias on the Bench" was also a finalist for Investigative Reporters & Editors' Innovation in Investigative Journalism—Small; for the Goldsmith Prize for Investigative Reporting, administered by the Shorenstein Center on Media, Politics and Public Policy at Harvard Kennedy School; and for the Selden Ring Award from the University of Southern California Annenberg School.

Other outlets have raised concerns about the Herald-Tribune's diminished staff and resources impacting the quality of its coverage. In 2022, the paper said it "erred" by publishing a column in support of the neo-fascist Proud Boys.

== Alumni ==
Editors of the Herald-Tribune include Bill Church, later senior vice president of news at GateHouse Media in Austin, Texas; Michael K. Connelly, later executive editor of the Buffalo News; and Diane McFarlin, later dean of the University of Florida College of Journalism and Communications. When McFarlin accepted the dean position in January 2013, she had been Herald-Tribune publisher for 13 years.

Other notable alumni of the newspaper include Chris Davis, now USA Today's vice president of investigative reporting (Davis, previously investigations editor at the Herald-Tribune and the Tampa Bay Times has been involved in seven Pulitzer Prize–winning or finalist projects); Matthew Doig, the assistant managing editor/investigations at the Los Angeles Times (Doig, another former Herald-Tribune investigations editor was previously investigations editor at The Seattle Times and Newsday); Aaron Kessler, an investigations reporter at the Herald-Tribune and now a senior producer at CNN (Kessler also worked at The New York Times, E.W. Scripps Company, 100Reporters and the Detroit Free Press); Anthony Cormier, another former Herald-Tribune investigations editor and Pulitzer winner who now works for BuzzFeed; and Carol E. Lee, a former Herald-Tribune reporter, later a White House correspondent for The Wall Street Journal. Food writer and author Kathleen Flinn notes that she first conceived of the concept for her New York Times-bestselling book The Sharper Your Knife, the Less You Cry, while writing obituaries at the paper.
