= Norman Wilkinson =

Norman Wilkinson may refer to:

- Norman Wilkinson (artist) (1878–1971), British marine artist and camoufleur
- Norman Wilkinson (stage designer) (1882–1934), British stage designer
- Norman Wilkinson (footballer, born 1910) (1910–1975), English footballer
- Norman Wilkinson (footballer, born 1931) (1931–2011), English footballer
