= Patricia Roberts =

Patricia Roberts may refer to:

- Patricia Roberts Harris (1924–1985), member of the Cabinet of the United States
- Patricia Roberts (basketball) (born 1955), American basketball coach and player
- Patricia Murphy (referee) (born 1981), Irish snooker referee also known as Patricia Roberts
- Patricia Easterbrook Roberts (1910–1987), Australian-born floral designer, author, and landscape designer
- Pat Roberts (golfer) (1921–2013), Welsh golfer
