= André J. Cointreau =

André J. Cointreau is the president and CEO of l’Ecole de Cuisine et de Pâtisserie Le Cordon Bleu, better known as Le Cordon Bleu. During his tenure, he has shifted the Le Cordon Bleu business from one school in Paris to a multinational concern with nearly 30 schools in 15 countries.

== Early life and career ==
Cointreau is a direct descendant of the family that created and marketed Cointreau liqueur. He holds degrees from the Hautes Etudes Commerciales (HEC) and Sciences Po, Paris (Sciences Politique). Cointreau began his career with Unilever and later The American Express Banking Corporation before he joined the family business as a commercial director in 1977 amid battles for control of the liquor magnate by the controlling families. Cointreau struck on his own in 1984, buying Le Cordon Bleu from Madame Elisabeth Brassart, an old family friend. He went on to become chairman and managing director of the family company Pages, and secretary general of Cognacs Frapin. He was also involved in the holding company that was created to manage the family owned assets of Rémy Martin and Cointreau. He stayed in the family business until 1984 following disputes over control of the firm between Cointreau and Rémy Martin.

Among other activities within the food and wine world, Cointreau helped to create the Science and Food Culture Foundation within the Académie des Sciences, and the Institute des Hautes Etudes du Goût (HEG) in conjunction with Reims University.

He also is CEO of Pierre Deux, a retail business focusing on French country decor and furnishings which he acquired in 1993; his wife, Hedwidge Cointreau de Bouteville, runs the Pierre Deux stores of which there are 20 based around France, the United States and Japan.

== Awards ==
In 2003, he was awarded “Person of the Year” by the Federation of Alliances Francaises of the US. In 2005, he received the Hall of Fame award for his contribution to the International Food & Beverage Forum. In 2008, Cointreau was awarded the Légion d’Honneur from the Foundation Alliance francaise for his contributions and accomplishments as head of Le Cordon Bleu and "for his unique educational concept." In 2026 he was awarded the Honoris Causa doctoral degree by the Anáhuac Cancún International University, due to his professional and academic contributions to the culinary and hospitality fields.
