= Sarasota Herald Building =

- U.S. National Register of Historic Places
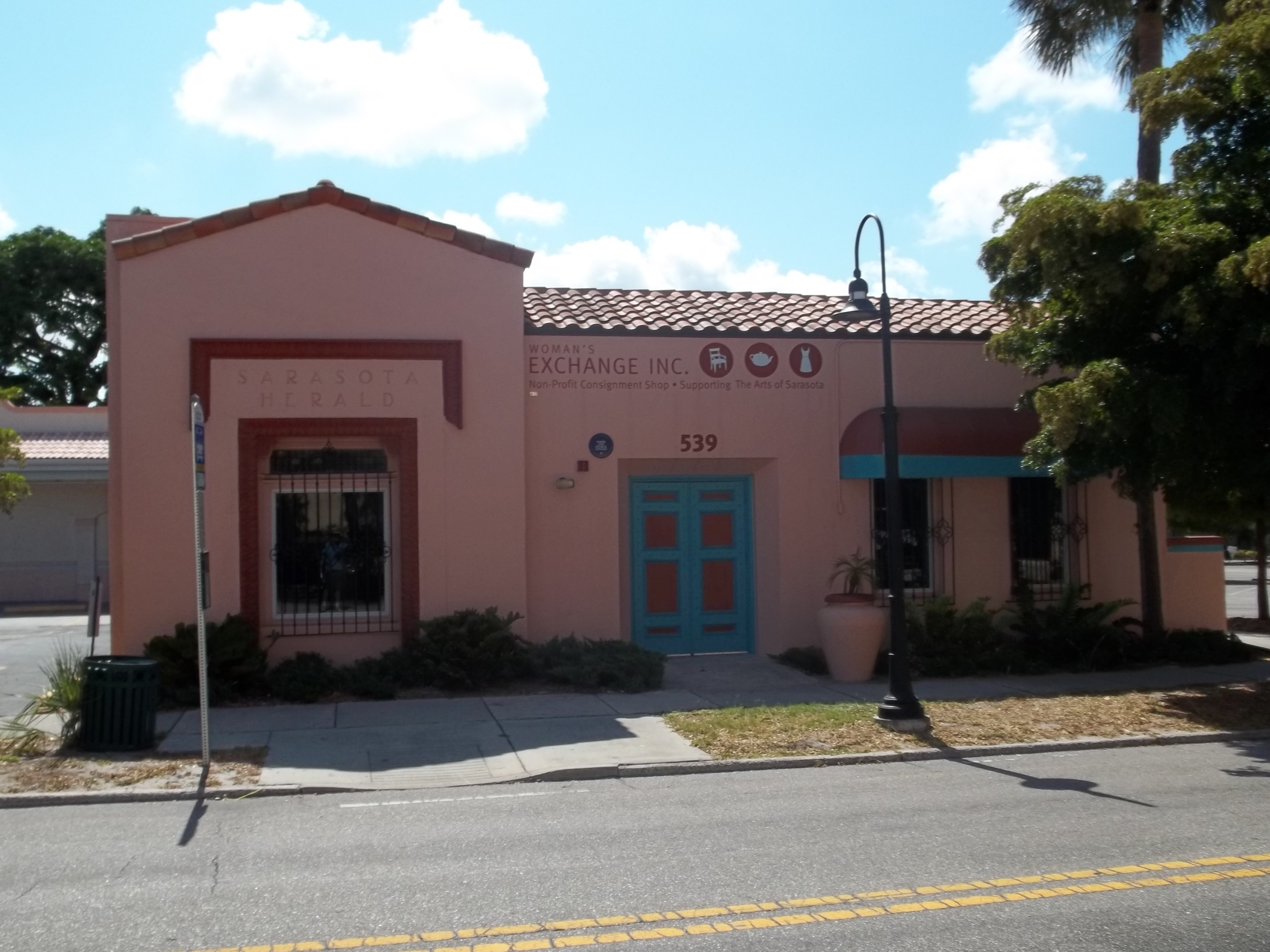

- Location within Florida
- Location: Sarasota, Florida
- Coordinates: 27°19′53″N 82°32′19″W
- Architectural style: Mediterranean Revival with Spanish Mission overtones
- MPS: Sarasota MRA
- NRHP reference No.: 84003843
- Added to NRHP: March 22, 1984

The Sarasota Herald Building is a historic structure located at 539 South Orange Avenue in Sarasota, Florida. The building served as the headquarters for Sarasota Herald-Tribune from 1925 to 1969.

== History ==
The structure was built by Owen Burns. On March 22, 1984, it was added to the U.S. National Register of Historic Places. In 1969, the Sarasota Woman's Exchange moved in after purchasing and renovating the building. More renovations were carried out in 1982.

== Gallery ==
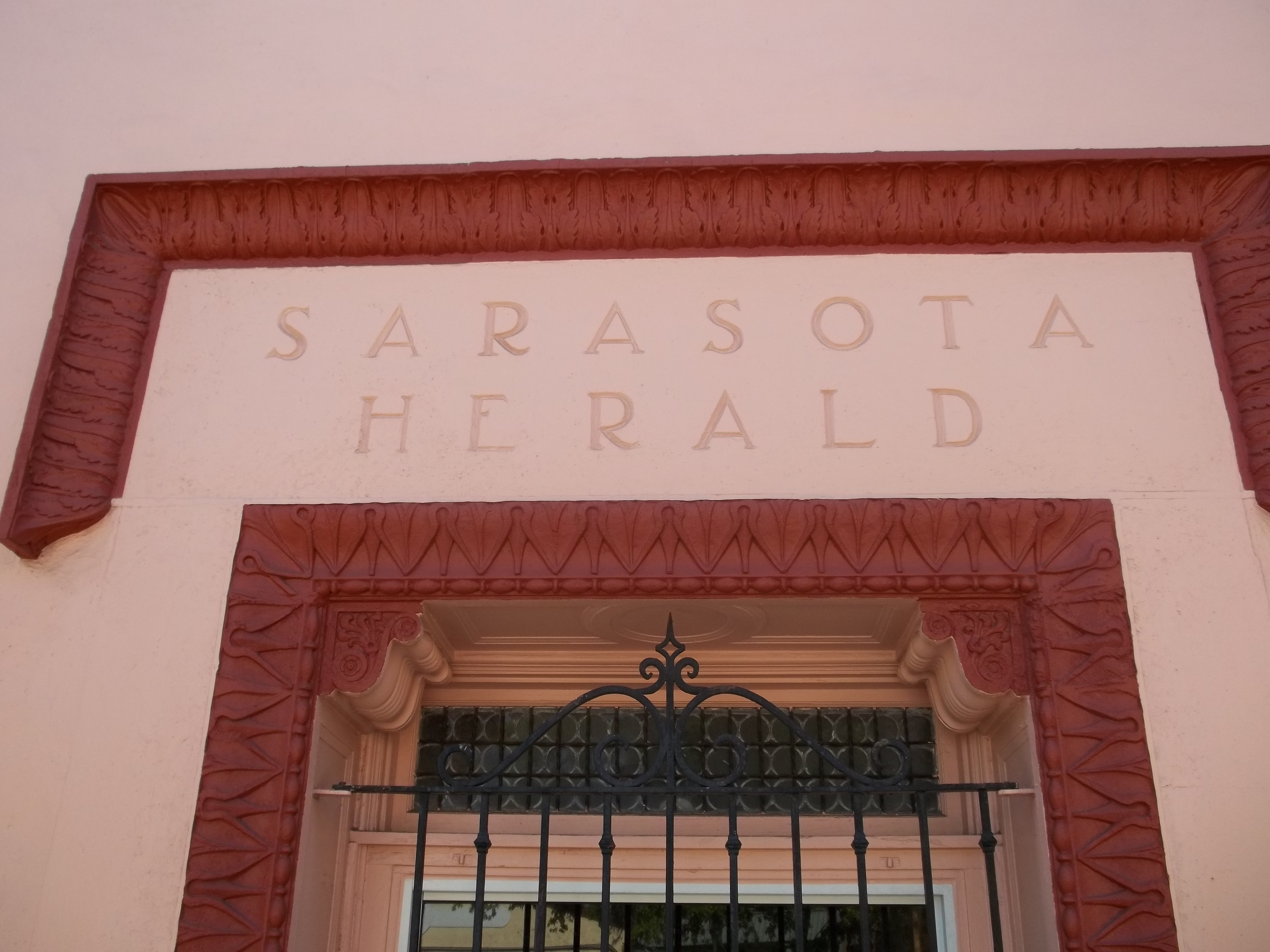
Sarasota Herald building detail

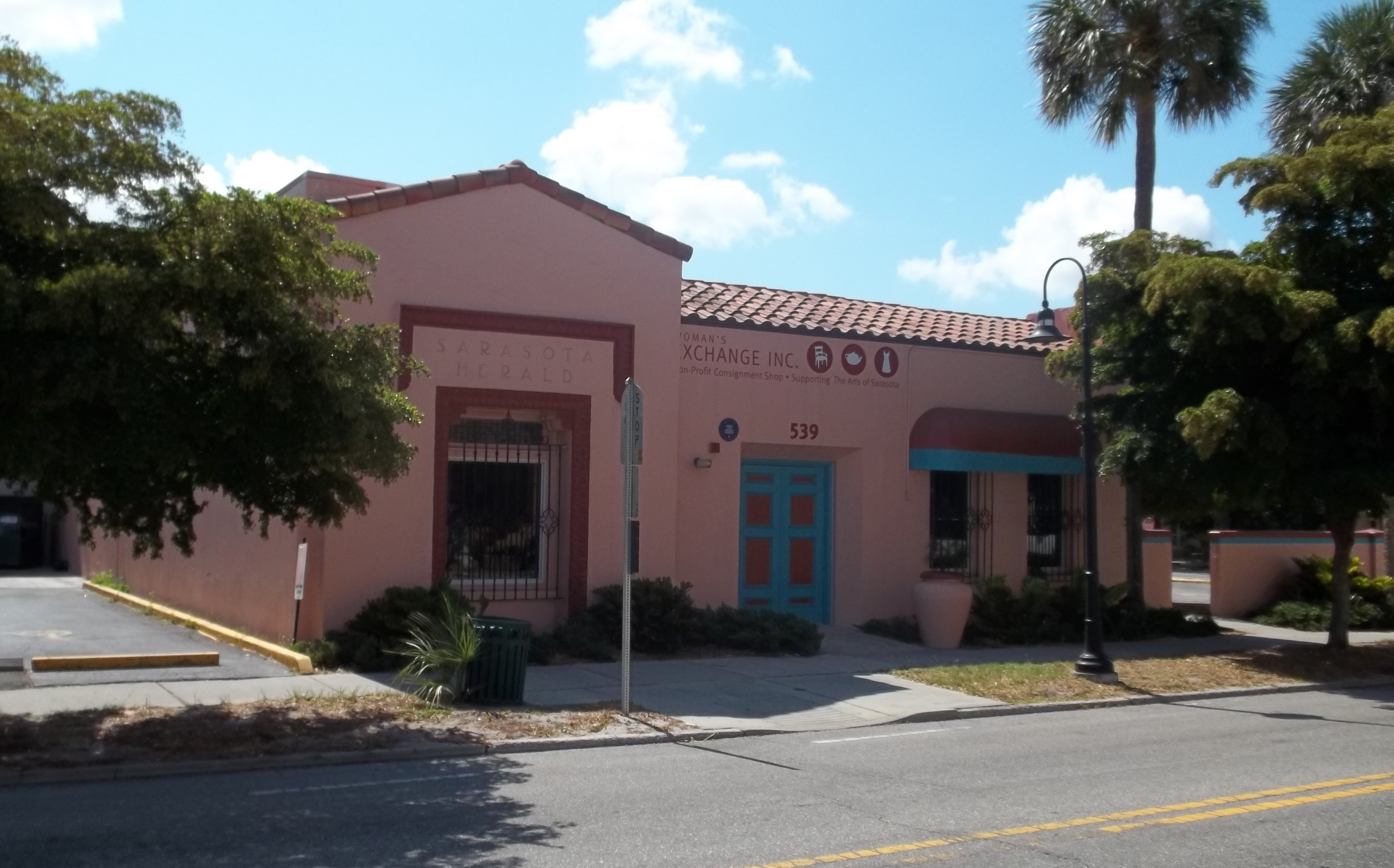
Sarasota Herald building, now the Woman's Exchange, in 2011

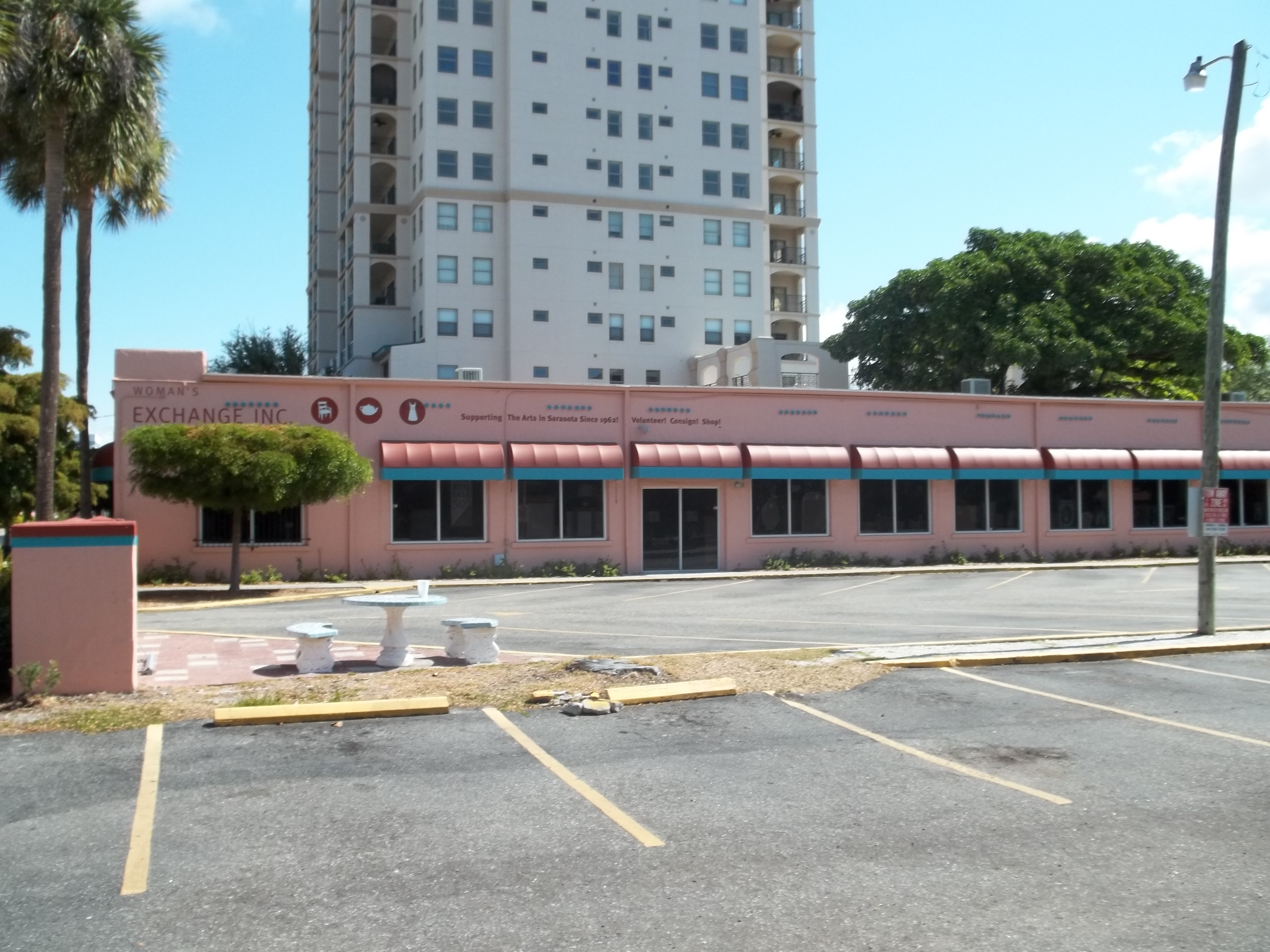
Sarasota Herald building from the rear parking lot (2011)
