= Teresa Ocampo =

Peruvian chef and writer

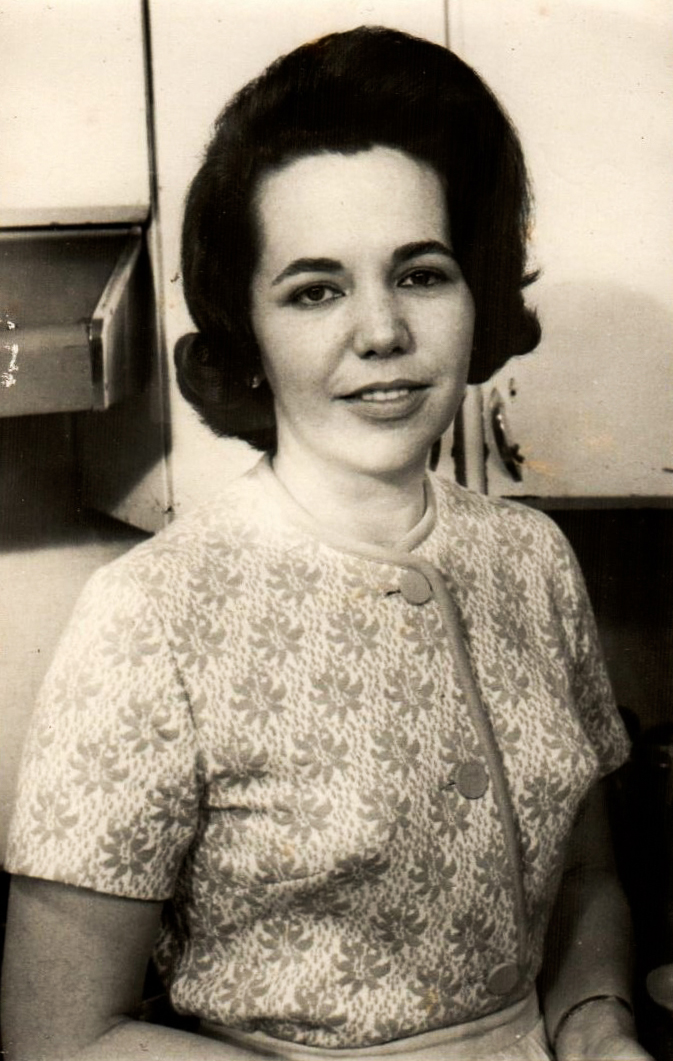
- Ocampo, c. 1960
- Born: María Teresa Carlota Ocampo Oliart; October 13, 1931 (age 94); Cuzco, Peru
- Occupations: food writer chef

Teresa Ocampo Oliart (Cuzco, October 13, 1931) is a Peruvian chef and writer. She was a pioneer of Peruvian cuisine, and founder and first president of the Peruvian Gastronomic Association. In 2022, she was named by Forbes as one of the most powerful 50 women of Peru.

== Biography ==
María Teresa Carlota Ocampo Oliart was born on 13 October 1931, in the hacienda of the Granja Escuela K’ayra, in the southeast part of the city of Cusco. When she was four years old, her parents, Carlota and Alcides, moved to Lima, the capital of the country, living in the center of the city. Ocampo received her basic education at the Colegio Sagrado Corazón Sophianum. After living in the center of the capital for 15 years, the family moved to Miraflores District. In the new residence, Carlota Oliart began to give home cooking classes 2 times a week to her neighbors. Teresa would assist her mother. Carlota had learned to cook from her mother, and both had studied gastronomy in Europe. The recipes collected by Teresa Ocampo date back to the time of her great-grandmother, María Mercedes Picoaga (1798-1859).

She would get her gastronomy education in Le Cordon Bleu of París, and in 1952 she could dedicate herself to her role of Professor of Cooking in the female education center Institute of Good Domestic Studies of the Home. In culinary school she signed up, alongside her mother, for cooking and baking classes.

Recipe for ají de gallina by Teresa Ocampo, deposited in University of Le Cordon Bleu

Beginning in 1959, she participated first as a judge and later as a presenter of the TV program ¿Qué cocinaré? (What will I cook?) sponsored by Nicolini noodles and aired by Panamericana Televisión; the show ran until 1966. In the said space she breathed new life into the national cuisine, using local products and recipes common in Peruvian cuisine, as well as cheap and popular ingredients instead of expensive ones. She also mentored other Peruvian cooks, like Pedro Solari, Teresa Izquierdo, and Alfredo Aramburú, among others.

In 1967 she began a new show Su menú con Teresa on Channel 4, a show with a similar format to her previous show, but with the novelty of a section for children. This was sponsored by Astra margarine. She quit in 1968 in protest of the political reforms of the Revolutionary Government of the Armed Forces, returning in 1980. Five years afterwards she produced and directed La cocina de Teresa (Teresa's Kitchen), one of the first independent TV programs, where she invited chefs specializing in fusion cuisine, such as chifa.

At the same time, she had a food column in the newspaper El Comercio and published recipe collections. One of the most well-known collections is called ¿Qué cocinaré hoy?

In 1987, she was one of the founders of the Peruvian Gastronomic Association (Asociación Gastronómica Peruana, Agape) and its first president. The organization's goal was the spread of Peruvian food to the South American content by organizing fairs and festivals, such as the "Festival of Peruvian Food" in the headquarters of the United Nations in New York. The next year she retired from television and moved to the United States.

In 2011 the Provincial Municipality of Cuzco bestowed on Ocampo the Medal of Honor and she was named Honored Citizen of the City of Cusco.

In 2017 she received the distinction Personalidad Meritoria de la Cultura, awarded by the Ministry of Culture of Peru, in recognition of her contributions to the national gastronomic culture. The same year, the Government of Peru bestowed on her the award Order of Merit for Distinguished Services, received in Dallas, where she lives.

She has three sons.

== Publications ==
- ¿Qué cocinaré hoy?
- Su majestad el pescado (His Majesty, the Fish)
- 2021, Mis mejores recetas, de la A a la Z (My best recipes, from A to Z) (winner of "University Press Books" and "Women Books" in the Gourmand Cookbook Awards)
