= Eudes Assis =

Brazilian chef

Eudes Assis (from Boiçucanga, São Sebastião, São Paulo, Brazil) known mostly as Chef Eudes, is a chef known in Brazil for using ingredients of "caiçara" culture.

== Early life ==
Assis had eight brothers and five sisters. His mother taught him about the preparation of fish and instilled in him a love for "caiçara" cuisine. At 13, he started as a dishwasher at a restaurant in Camburi.

== Career ==
In 2002, he joined as trainee at the Fasano Restaurant in São Paulo. In 2006 he spent six months in France, at the culinary school Le Cordon Bleu. He continued working in restaurants in Europe, and then spent four years as a chef aboard a private yacht visiting several countries, and learning about local cuisines. This led him to emphasize the use of regional ingredients, like tapioca and bananas, local seafood and dried fish, typical of coastal regions and of the "caiçara" cuisine. He has collaborated with chefs including Ferran Adria, Alain Ducasse and Daniel Boulud. He is currently a chef in Restaurant Vinea Alphaville.

Eudes Assis prefers to use only non-industrialized products.

Eudes also teaches at schools, offering classes about cuisine.

== Specialties ==
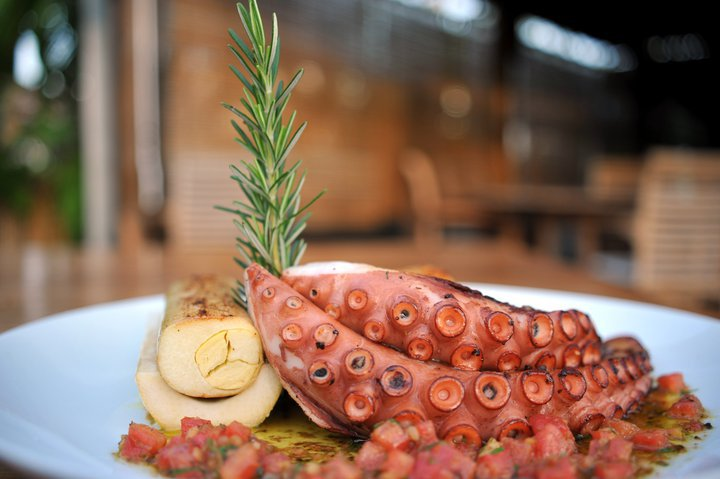
Octopus and pupunha

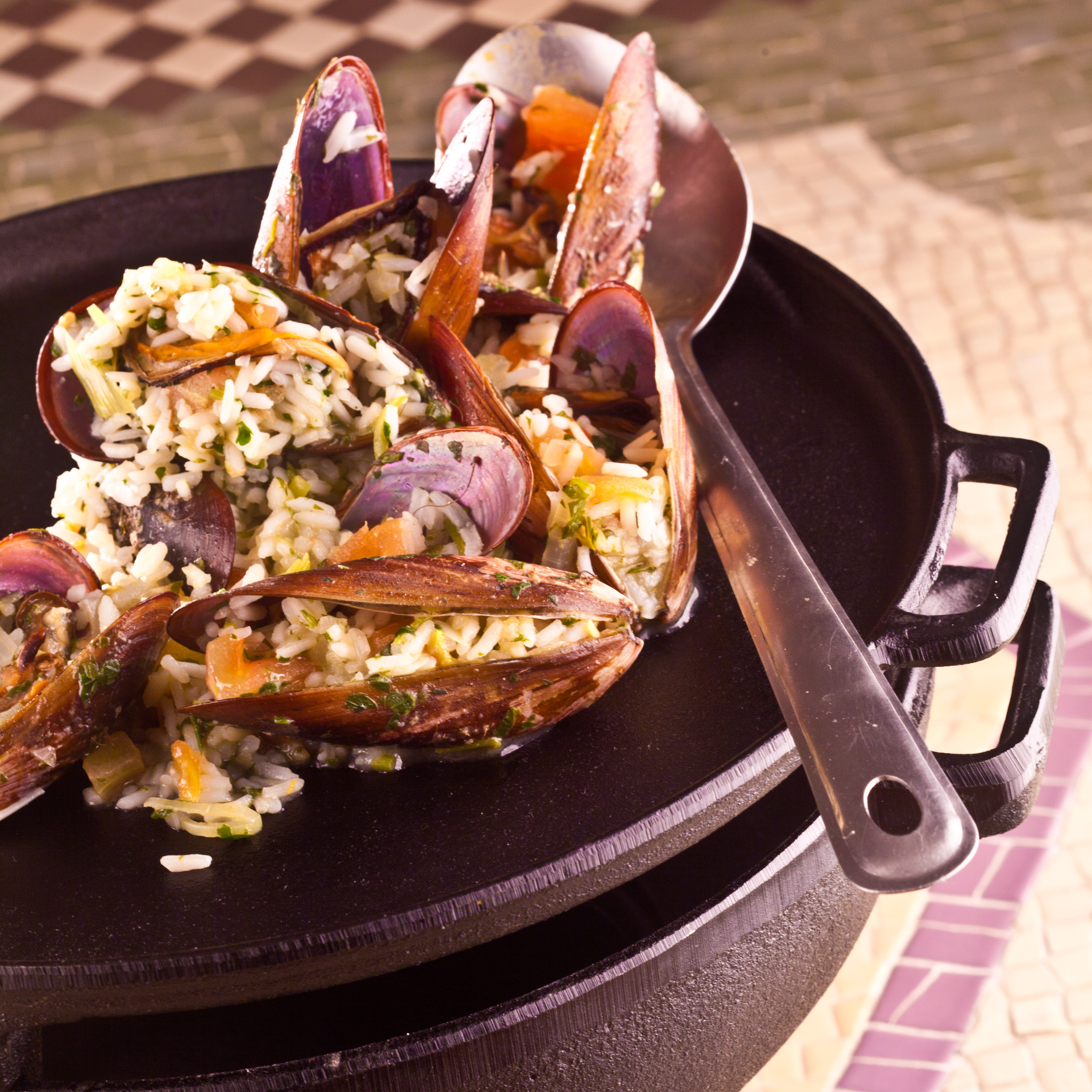
Shellfish rice

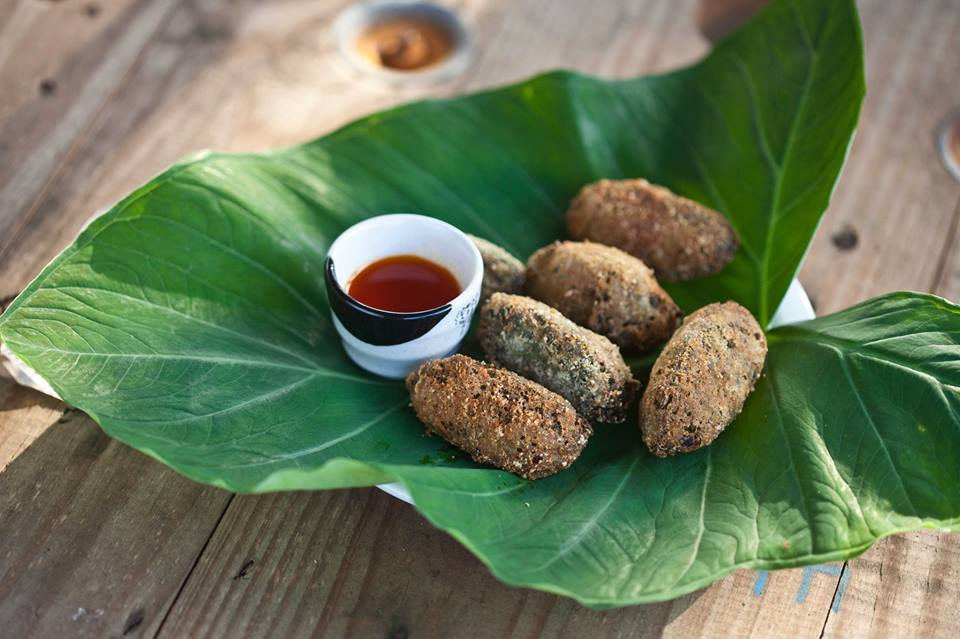
Taro leaf balls

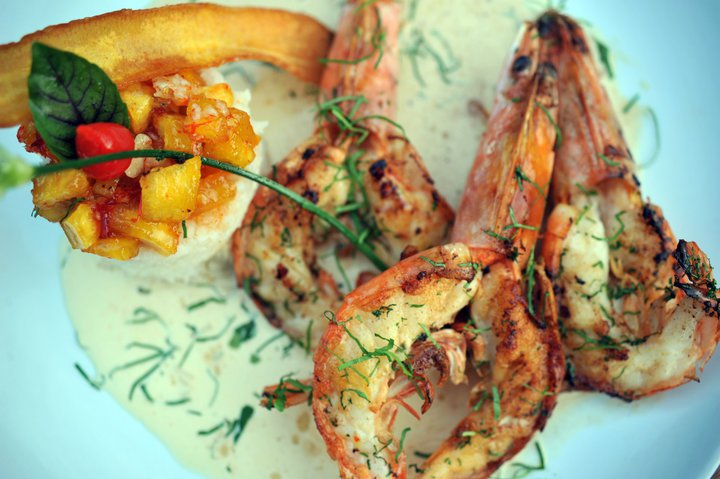
Banana chutney

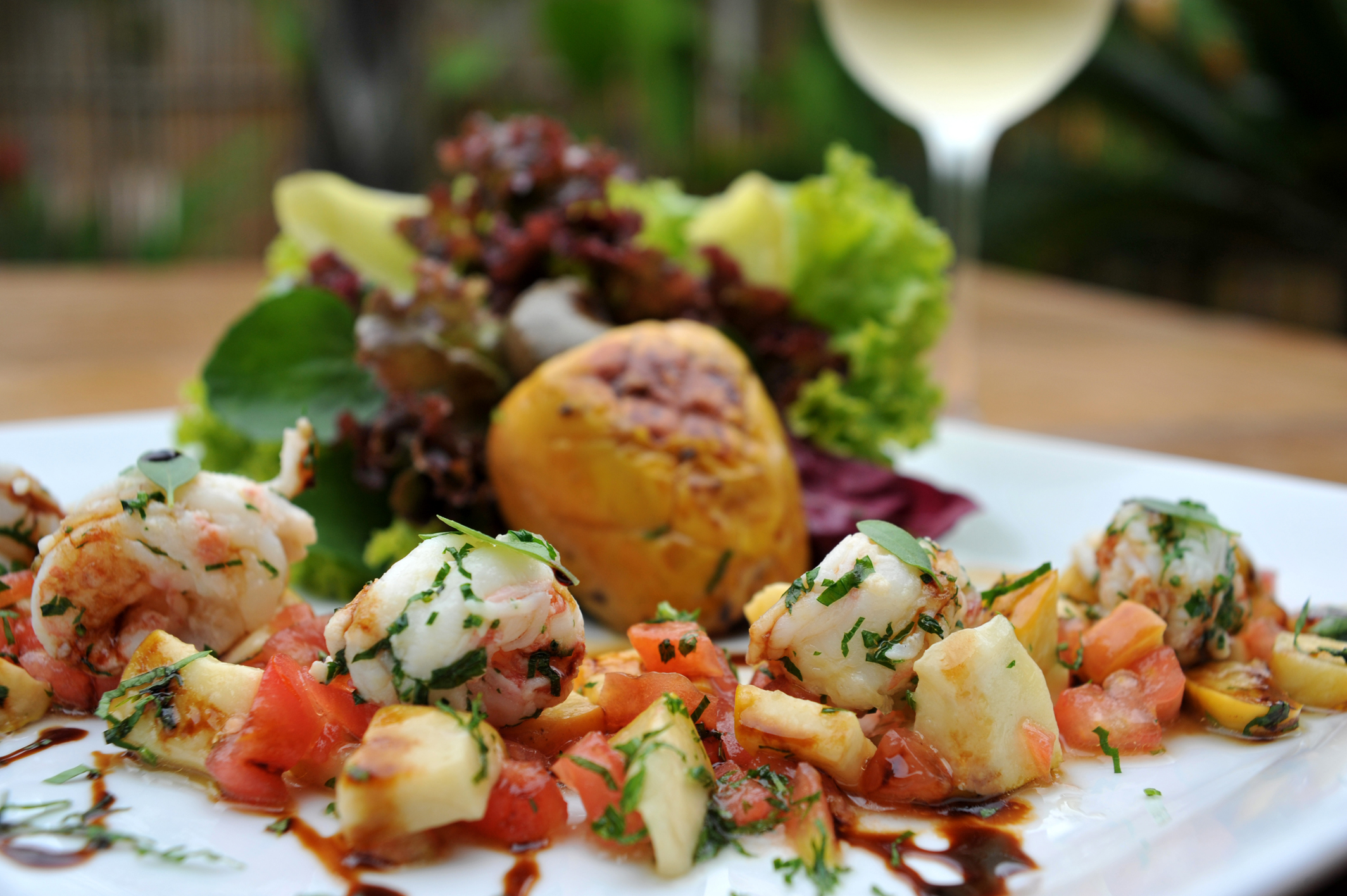
Salad of crayfish flambéed in cachaça with cashew vinaigrette

== Social projects ==
Eudes volunteers in "Projeto Buscapé", a nonprofit association of Boicucanga - North Coast of São Paulo. He teaches gastronomy to local children.

He is also curator of "Arraial Gastronomico do Projeto Buscapé". In 2013, this Project received the Social Responsibility award from "Prazeres da Mesa" magazine.

== Awards ==
- Most promising chef, 2010 by Prazeres da Mesa Magazine
- Best Seafood Restaurant - Restaurant "Seu Sebastião" by "Veja Comer&Beber" Magazine
- Award of Merit given by the city of São Sebastião for Disclosure of Brazilian Cuisine
- Award Social responsibility given to the Buscapé Project, by "Prazeres da Mesa" magazine.
