= Madame Brassart =

Le Cordon Bleu proprietor (1897–1992)

- Born: Élisabeth Brassart; 1897
- Died: 1992 (aged 94–95)

Élisabeth Brassart (1897–1992) was the proprietor of the Le Cordon Bleu school in Paris from 1945 to 1984. Le Cordon Bleu had been founded in 1895 by Marthe Distel and Henri-Paul Pellaprat.

In 1945, after the end of WWII, she purchased what had become a struggling school from a Catholic orphanage which had inherited it after the school's founder died in the late 1930s. The present owner, André J. Cointreau, purchased it from Brassart, who was an old family friend.

Brassart managed to attract many notable chefs to teach at the Le Cordon Bleu under her tenure, among them Max Bugnard, Claude Thillmont, and Pierre Mangelatte. The school was a very international school under her leadership. Students came from the United States, Japan and around the world. Madame Brassart managed the school until 1984, at the age of 87, she decided it was time to retire.

== Students ==
Madame Brassart has been painted unfavorably in several printed accounts, notably biographies of Julia Child, who studied at the school under Brassart.

"The truth is that Mme. Brassart and I got on each other's nerves. She seemed to think that awarding a student a diploma was like inducting them into some kind of secret society; as a result the school's hallways were filled with an air of petty jealousy and distrust. From my perspective, Mme. Brassart lacked professional experience, was a terrible administrator and tangled herself up in picayune details and politics..."- from My Life in France, excerpted in The New York Times, February 19, 2006

In the 2009 film, Julie & Julia, Brassart was portrayed by Joan Juliet Buck in accordance to how Child described her. Shortly after the film's release, Nina Zagat, who also spent time at Le Cordon Bleu under Brassart, and her husband responded to the film's portrayal with an article comparing Brassart and Child, whom they both knew personally and stating that Brassart was more sympathetic in real life. "Having known both women, we can safely say that it's hard to imagine two less compatible people. Julia was tall and assertive with a loud, braying voice in English—one can only imagine what she sounded like in French. Madame Brassart, in contrast, was petite, elegant, and aristocratic, and spoke impeccable French and English, as well as several other languages... From our point of view, Madame Brassart was much more sympathetic than portrayed in the film--she had a great sense of humor and could be very funny in an understated way ("Laughter was de rigueur with her," her niece said)--and her achievements as a culinary educator, much like Julia's, are indisputable.
