= Kathleen Flinn =

American writer, journalist and chef

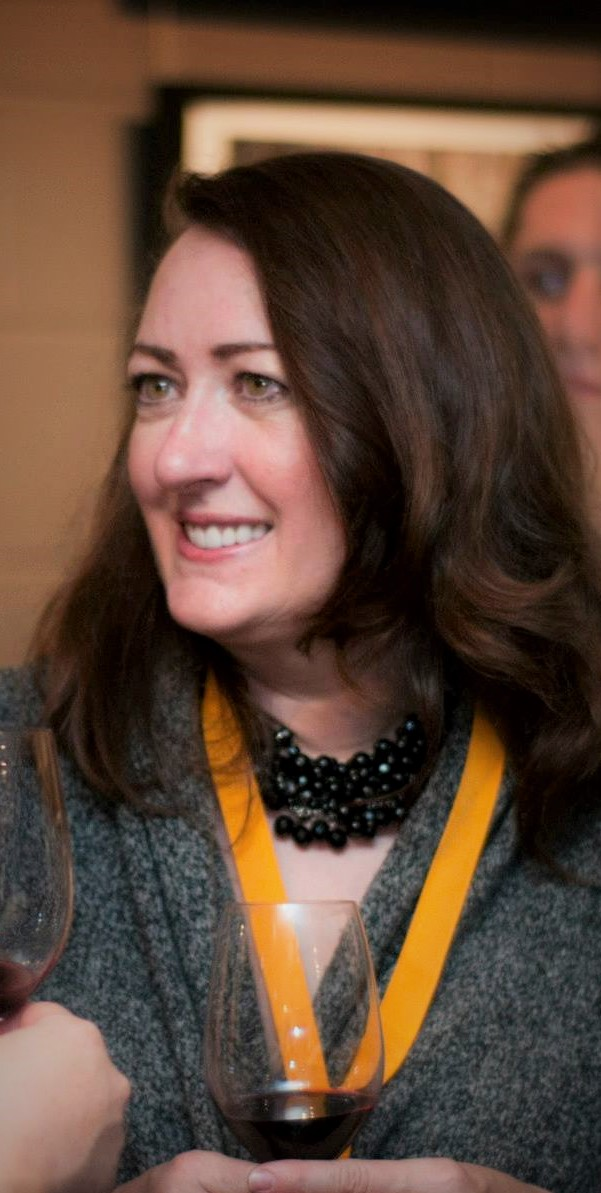
- Kathleen Flinn at the Devour Food Film Festival in Nova Scotia 2013
- Born: June 1, 1967 (age 59); Davison, Michigan, US
- Education: Columbia College Chicago; Le Cordon Bleu, Paris
- Occupation: writer
- Spouse: Michael Klozar
- Writing career
- Genres: Food writing, narrative non-fiction
- Notable works: The Sharper Your Knife, the Less You Cry: Love, Laughter and Tears at the World's Most Famous Cooking School
- Website: kathleenflinn.com

Kathleen Flinn (born June 1, 1967) is an American writer, journalist, chef and TV producer. She is best known for the 2007 New York Times bestseller, The Sharper Your Knife, the Less You Cry.

== Early life and education ==
Flinn was born in Davison, Michigan. Flinn states she began cooking at age eight to feed herself as a latchkey kid, and began writing stories around the same time. At the age of 11, she and her parents abruptly moved to Anna Maria Island in Florida due her father's terminal cancer diagnosis; he died two years later; these experiences are documented in her third book.

She was graduated from Manatee High School, in Bradenton, Florida.

== Books ==
Flinn's debut book, The Sharper Your Knife, the Less You Cry was the first to provide an in-depth look of attending and graduating from the famed Paris culinary school Le Cordon Bleu.

After losing her job due to a management reorganization, 36-year-old Flinn decided to cash in her savings to attend the famed culinary school, graduating with a diplome de cuisine in 2005. Throughout the book, Flinn intersperses dozens of recipes, accounts of her "wretchedly inadequate" French, stories of competitive classmates and the love story of a then-new relationship. Early in the book, she shares that she began dreaming of attending the famous cooking school while writing obituaries at The Sarasota Herald-Tribune. The Seattle Times referred to the book "a very personal memoir of transformation, as well as an insider's look at Le Cordon Bleu, the first of its kind." The book earned generally positive reviews on its debut and earned a spot on The New York Times bestseller list as well as being included on numerous "best of" lists for 2007 before being named a finalist for the Washington State Book Award in General Non-fiction in 2008.

Her second book, The Kitchen Counter Cooking School (Viking/Penguin, October 2011) chronicles a year-long project in which Flinn used her culinary training to help novice cooks find their cooking confidence and in the process, reported on the state of home cooking in general. The book earned a 2012 ASJA Award for Best Book in the Non-Fiction Autobiography/Memoir category from the American Society of Journalists and Authors

Her third book, Burnt Toast Makes You Sing Good, is a multi-generational culinary memoir about growing up in Michigan. That book was a finalist in several book awards, including Goodreads Readers Choice Awards and the International Association of Culinary Professionals, and was named a Michigan Notable Book.

Outside of her book publishing career, Flinn's work has been featured in more than three dozen publications worldwide.

== TV series ==
In December 2025, it was announced that The Sharper Your Knife, the Less You Cry was in development as a TV series by Fox Entertainment Studios as the first scripted series to be produced by celebrity chef Gordon Ramsay., with Rachel Bilson set to star as Flinn, best-selling author Stephanie Danler as the series writer, and Flinn named as an executive producer.

== Popularity in Japan ==
In 2017, Flinn's second book, The Kitchen Counter Cooking School, was translated into Japanese under the title Dameonnatachi no Jinsei wo Kaeta Kiseki no Ryouri Kyoushitsu which loosely translates to Magical Recipes for Bad Women. The book was a bestseller, and among the few translated works that reached the top 30 in sales on Amazon.jp that year.

== Other notable work ==
While earning a B.A. in journalism at Columbia College Chicago, she held internships at Adweek and Playboy magazines and worked as a stringer for the Chicago Sun-Times before launching on a journalism career that included newspapers and magazines. She was founding editor-in-chief of Internet Underground,, a print magazine about the internet launched in 1994 which later developed a cult following. She was recruited by Microsoft to work on the prototype of what would become Sidewalk.com, the company's network of online city guides In 2000, while working as an online producer for MSN.co.uk in London, she was among a small team behind Madonna's "come back" concert at the Brixton Academy; with 11 million viewers, the event was listed in the Guinness Book of World Records as the largest live webcast for several years.

== Personal ==
Flinn is married to Michael Klozar; their courtship is part of the story in The Sharper Your Knife.

== Books ==
- Seattle Sidewalk Restaurant Guide. 1997. ISBN 1-5706108-00.
- The Sharper Your Knife, the Less You Cry. 2007. ISBN 978-0670018222., New York Times bestseller
- The Kitchen Counter Cooking School. 2011. ISBN 978-0670023004., winner, 2012 Book Award, American Society of Journalists & Authors
- Burnt Toast Makes You Sing Good: A Memoir of Food and Love from an American Midwest Family. 2014. ISBN 978-0670015443.
- Dameonnatachi no Jinsei wo Kaeta Kiseki no Ryouri Kyoushitsu (Japanese edition). 2014. ASIN B0747HRCMG.
