= The Sharper Your Knife, the Less You Cry =

2007 memoir with recipes by Kathleen Flinn

- Author: Kathleen Flinn
- Language: English
- Subject: Autobiography
- Publisher: Viking Press, paperback Penguin Books
- Publication date: October 4, 2007
- Publication place: United States
- Pages: 327
- ISBN: 0-670-01822-8
- Followed by: The Kitchen Counter Cooking School (2011)

The Sharper Your Knife, the Less You Cry: Love, Laughter and Tears at the World's Most Famous Cooking School is a New York Times best-selling memoir with recipes by American writer Kathleen Flinn. It was first published by the Viking Press on October 4, 2007, ISBN 0-670-01822-8.

In this non-fiction narrative, the 36-year-old author loses her corporate job, cashes in her savings and heads to Paris to study at the Le Cordon Bleu cooking school. It is notable in being the first book-length account of the experience of attending the famous school. Throughout the book, Flinn intersperses dozens of recipes, accounts of her "wretchedly inadequate" French, stories of competitive classmates and the love story of her emerging relationship with her husband. Early in the book, she shares that she began dreaming of attending the famous cooking school while writing obituaries at The Sarasota Herald-Tribune. The Seattle Times referred to the book "a very personal memoir of transformation, as well as an insider's look at Le Cordon Bleu, the first of its kind." The book earned generally positive reviews on its debut and earned a spot on The New York Times bestseller list as well as being included on numerous "best of" lists for 2007.

The Sharper Your Knife, the Less You Cry was a Finalist for the Washington State Book Award in General Nonfiction in 2008.

== TV Series ==
In December 2025, it was announced that The Sharper Your Knife, the Less You Cry was in development as a TV series by Fox Entertainment Studios as the first scripted series to be produced by celebrity chef Gordon Ramsay., with Rachel Bilson set to star as Flinn, best-selling author Stephanie Danler as the series writer, and Flinn named as an executive producer.
