= Regula Ysewijn =

Flemish food writer

Regula Ysewijn, MBE (Member of the Order of the British Empire) is a Flemish food writer and photographer. She is known in Belgium as a judge for the television programmes Bake Off Vlaanderen and Junior Bake Off and internationally as one of the judges for the special programme BBC One's The Jubilee Pudding: 70 Years in the Baking (2022). Ysewijn is the author of seven award-winning books on food and drink culture and has been a judge for the Guild of Fine Food for over 10 years.

== Biography ==
Ysewijn grew up in Antwerp, in the Flemish part of Belgium. She studied graphic design at the Sint Maria Institute in Antwerp, after which she did one year specialization in graphics and ancient printing techniques and two more years of specialization in fashion design. After working for a short time in the fashion industry, she worked for eight years as a graphic designer in advertising.

In 2010, she started her blog, which led to her becoming a freelance writer in 2013. From 2014 to 2016 she wrote for the British digital magazine Fish on Friday. Pieces for The Guardian and the iNews and several other publications followed. Ysewijn mainly writes about culinary history and published her first book, Pride and Pudding, about the history of British puddings in 2015 (in Belgium; 2016 publication in the UK, Australia, New Zealand and the US). Belgian Café Culture, the National Trust Book of Puddings, Brits Bakboek, Oats in the North, Wheat from the South (The British Baking Book in the US) and The Official Downton Abbey Christmas Cookbook followed.

Following the release of The British Baking Book, Ysewijn was praised in 2020 by The New Yorker Magazine for recognizing the role of slavery in the development of a baking culture in Europe, but also for writing culinary history in a readable and clear way. On June 8 2024 she became the first Belgian author to win the prestigious James Beard Award https://www.eater.com/24173865/james-beard-foundation-awards-2024-media-winners-cookbooks-journalism for her book Dark rye and Honey cake, Festival baking from Belgium the heart of the Low Countries. A book with history and recipes.

She has been one of the two judges for the Bake-off Vlaanderen program since 2017 and Junior Bake Off since 2020. She is also a jury member of the Guild of Fine Food's 'Great Taste Awards' and the World Cheese Awards. On January 10, 2022, Regula was announced as one of the judges of The Platinum Pudding Competition in honor of the Platinum Jubilee of Britain's Queen Elizabeth II.

In August 2024, she was awarded the title of MBE (Member of the Order of the British Empire) by King Charles III in recognition of her services to British food and culture in Belgium and the UK.

== Television and Radio ==
Besides Bake Off Vlaanderen, which started in 2017, Ysewijn also regularly participates in television and radio programs in the United Kingdom, including BBC Radio 4's The Food Programme, BBC One Breakfast, BBC One 'Inside the Factory' and as a jury member in BBC One The Platinum Pudding: 70 years in the baking, a program about the search for the Platinum Pudding for the Queen's Jubilee in 2022.

== Bibliography ==
- Pride and Pudding - the history of British Puddings (2016 Murdoch Books), new English edition in 2022 (Murdoch Books)
- Belgian Café Culture – A Portrait of the iconic café (2016 and anniversary edition in 2021, Luster)
- The National Trust Book Of Puddings (2019, National Trust)
- Brits Bakboek (2019, Carrera Culinair)
- Oats in the North, Wheat from the South - a history of British Baking (2020, Murdoch Books) US edition: The British Baking Book (2020, Weldon Owen)
- The Official Downton Abbey Christmas Cookbook (2020, Weldon Owen US, Titan Books UK)
- Dark rye and Honey cake / Van wafel tot koek (2023, Murdoch Books UK/AUS/NZ, Weldon Owen US, Overamstel NL/BE)
- The Official Bridgerton Cookbook (2024, Penguin Random House - Netflix - Shondaland)

== Awards and nominations ==
2016 - Fortnum & Mason Food & Drink Awards nomination for Pride and Pudding

2016 - Andre Simon Memorial Award Nomination for Pride and Pudding

2017 - Best British Culinary Heritage Book (Gourmand World Cookbook Awards) for Pride and Pudding

2018 - Best Belgian Culinary Heritage Book (Gourmand World Book Awards) for Authentic Belgian Cafés

2019 - Best Cookbooks of the 2000s (Great British Food Awards) for Pride and Pudding

2019 - Silver medal 'The Golden Cookbook' for British baking book

2020 - Best British Culinary Heritage Book (Gourmand World Cookbook Awards) for Oats in the North, Wheat from the South

2020 - 'Andre Simon Memorial Award' Nomination and 'Highly Commended' nomination by the Guild of Food Writers Awards 2021 for Oats in the North, Wheat from the South

2023 - Silver medal 'The Golden Cookbook' for Dark rye and Honey cake

2024 - 'Andre Simon Memorial Award' Nomination for Dark rye and Honey cake

2024 - 'James Beard Award' for Dark rye and Honey cake

2024 - 'MBE' (Member of the Order of the British Empire) by King Charles III for services to British food and culture in Belgium and the UK.
