= Dione Lucas =

English chef

Dione Lucas (pronounced dee-OH-nee; née Wilson; 10 October 1909 – 18 December 1971) was a British chef, and the first female graduate of Le Cordon Bleu. Her father was the architect, jeweller, and designer Henry Wilson, and her sister was the violinist Orrea Pernel (1906–1993). She was married to Colin Lucas (1906–1984), an architect.

== Life ==
Dione Wilson was fundamental in establishing an extension of the Cordon Bleu in London in the 1930s. She married the architect Colin Lucas on 9 April 1930. In 1931 she and Rosemary Hume (with whom she had trained in Paris), set up a cookery school in Sloane Street, London, the interior of which was designed by Colin Lucas. They had a flat in Chelsea and they would reputedly serve their students' creations to passing trade at chairs and tables on the pavement. Lucas is thought to have helped Hume create her first cookery book, as Hume's spelling was known to be poor.

Having grown up in Venice, England and Paris, Lucas worked as a hotel chef in Hamburg before World War II, and later claimed that Adolf Hitler often dined there and had a taste for stuffed squab. She later opened a Cordon Bleu restaurant and a cooking school in New York, on the ground floor of 117 E. 60th St. She also ran the Egg Basket restaurant by Bloomingdale's in New York. One of the earliest television cook-show hosts, Lucas's To The Queen's Taste was broadcast on CBS in 1948-1949 from the restaurant.

Lucas was the first woman featured in a cooking show on television on WPIX (Channel 11) in New York City. In one of her New York restaurants, The Gingerman, Lucas helped to introduce the omelette to the American palate. She can be seen as a predecessor and influence to Julia Child.

== Death ==
During the last two years of her life, she underwent serious surgery. She died of pneumonia in London on 18 December 1971, aged 62.

== Quotes ==
- "The preparation of good food is merely another expression of art, one of the joys of civilized living."
- "I do not mean to spoil your appetite for stuffed squab, but you might be interested to know that it was a great favorite with Mr. Hitler, who dined at the hotel often. Let us not hold that against a fine recipe though."

== Works ==
=== Books ===
- Au Petit Cordon Bleu: an array of recipes from the École du Petit cordon bleu (1936, with Rosemary Hume) (29 Sloane Street, London)
- The Cordon Bleu Cook Book (1947)
- The Dione Lucas Meat and Poultry Cook Book (1955, with Anne Roe Robbins) 324 pages. Illustrated.
- Good Cooking. (1960) 64 pages.Illustrated. (Australian Consolidated Press, Sydney)
- Gourmet Cooking School Cookbook (1964) (Bernard Geis Associates)
- The Dione Lucas Book of French Cooking (1973 with Marion Gorman)
- The Dione Lucas Book of Natural French Cooking (1977, with Marion & Felipe Alba)
- Gourmet Cooking School Cookbook (1982 with Darlene Geis)

=== Television ===
- To The Queen's Taste (December 1946 – 1948) ABC
- The Dione Lucas Cooking School (25 February 1948 – 29 December 1949) CBS
- The Dione Lucas Cooking Show (1950–1956) CBS
- The Dione Lucas Hour (1956–1958) Syndicated
- Dione Lucas's Gourmet Club (1958–1960) Syndicated
- Dollars and Sense Cooking (1960–1962) Syndicated
