= Platinum Pudding =

Pudding celebrating Queen Elizabeth II

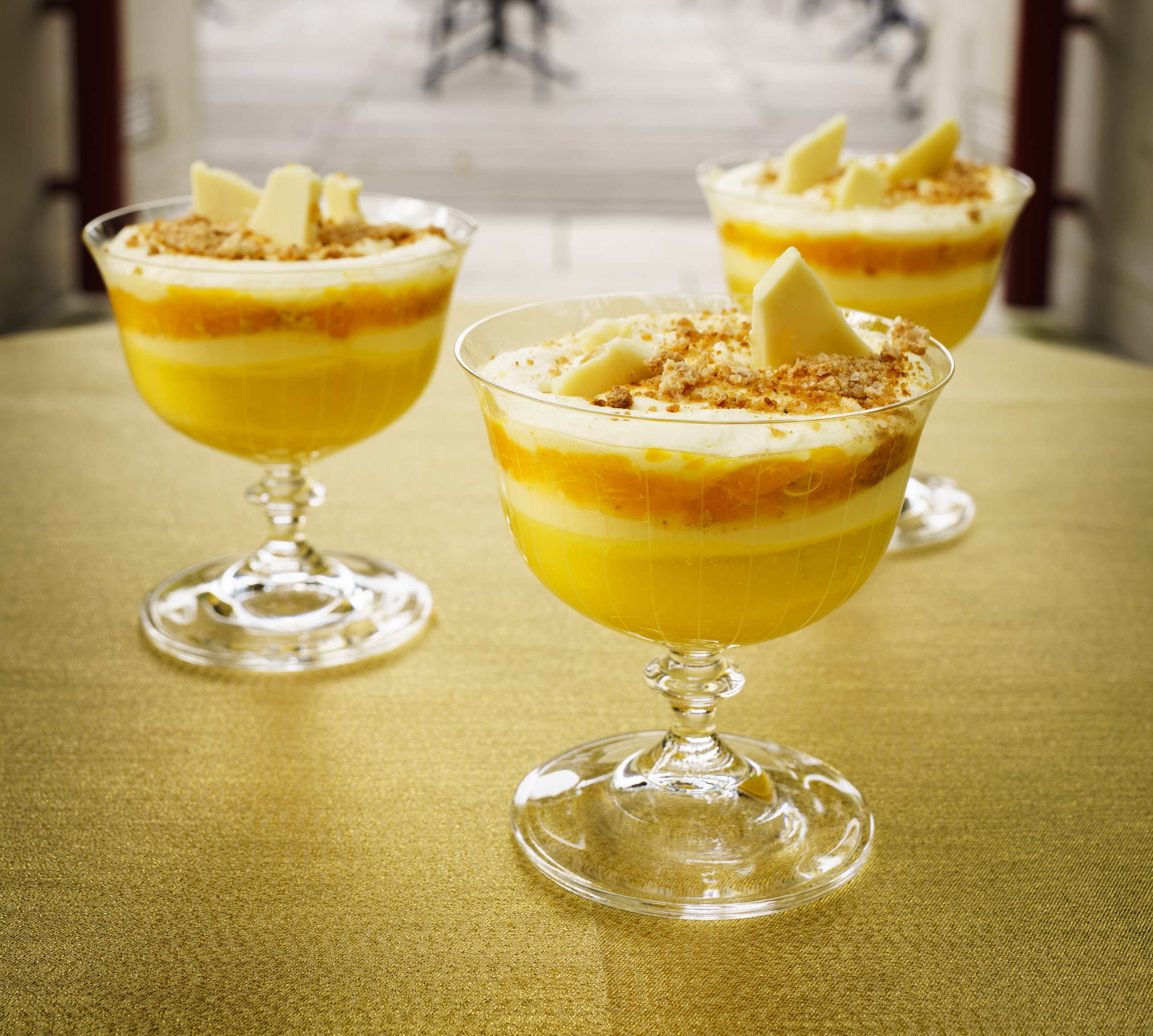
- Type: Trifle
- Course: Dessert
- Place of origin: United Kingdom
- Created by: Jemma Melvin
- Invented: 2022

The Platinum Pudding is a British pudding consisting of a lemon and amaretti trifle. It was created by Jemma Melvin in 2022 for a competition celebrating the Platinum Jubilee of Queen Elizabeth II.

== Competition ==
The Platinum Pudding Competition was established in 2021 by the London department store Fortnum & Mason, conceived by the British diplomat and food, culture, and travel writer Ameer Kotecha and the former British diplomat and curator Jason Kelly, who shared their idea with Fortnum & Mason.

The competition was launched throughout the United Kingdom on 10 January 2022 by Buckingham Palace, Fortnum & Mason and the Big Jubilee Lunch to find a new pudding dedicated to Queen Elizabeth II as part of that year's Platinum Jubilee celebrations. Nadine Dorries, the United Kingdom Secretary of State for Digital, Culture, Media and Sport, said: "The Platinum Pudding Competition is a wonderful way to celebrate Her Majesty's 70 year reign and I know it will inspire people of all ages across the UK to get baking".

Upon closure of competition entries, Fortnum & Mason chefs managed the process of filtering competition entries in preparation of the competition's final, which Fortnum & Mason hosted at their principal store on Piccadilly in central London. From the competition outset, the firm committed to sharing the winning recipe.

The winning pudding was intended to be an important part of the celebrations marking the Jubilee, with the winner at the centre of the celebrations. "The winning recipe will be made available to the public and the pudding will be enjoyed at Big Jubilee Lunches during the Jubilee weekend, and by generations to come," the Palace said.

=== Eligibility ===
British residents aged 8 and over were eligible for the competition, along with all individuals, families, school classes, community groups, companies and other entities.

=== Judges ===
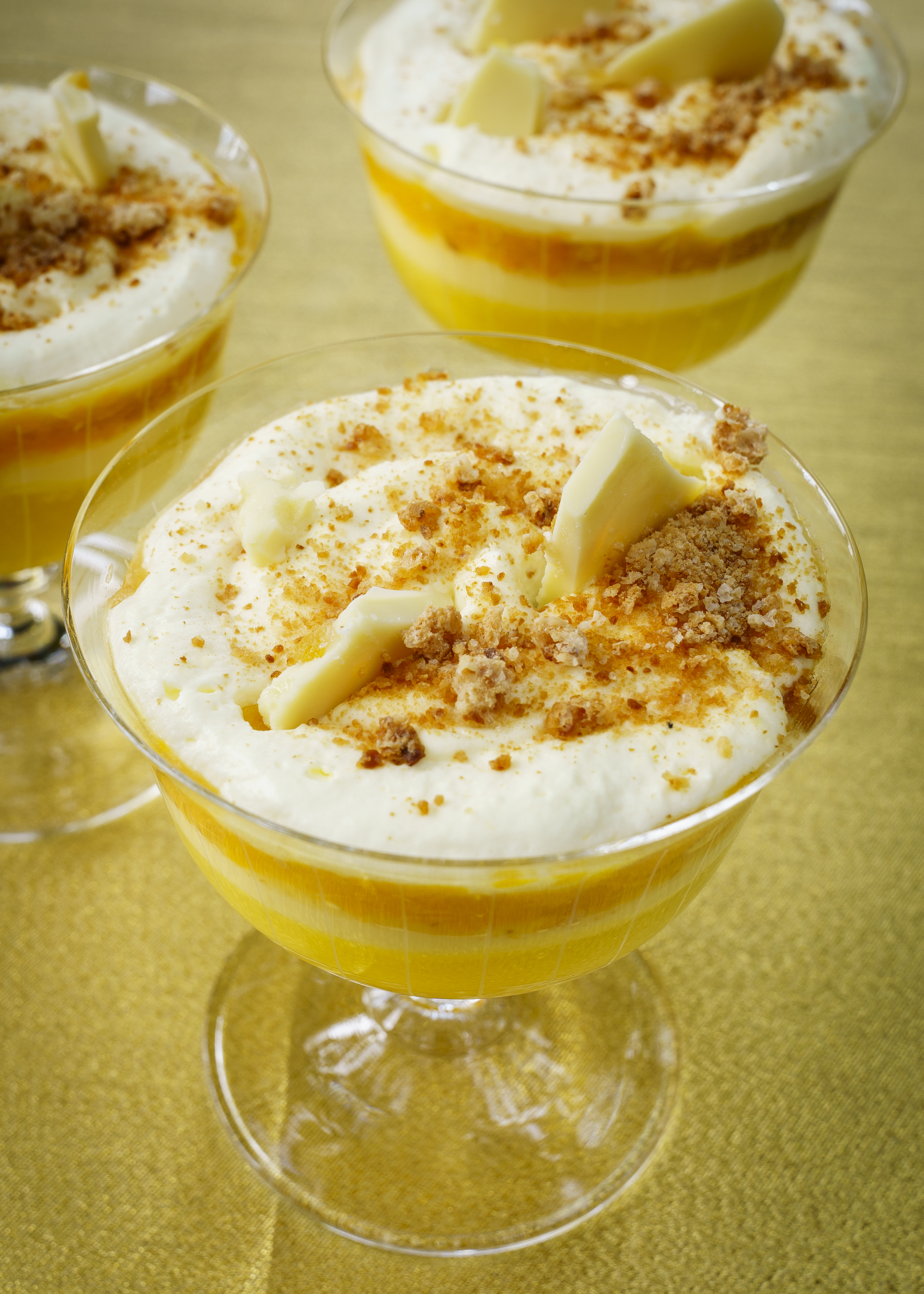
A Platinum Jubilee pudding

The judging panel was chaired by an independent panel of expert judges comprising notable home bakers, professional chefs, authors, historians and patissiers. They were:

- Mary Berry: Food writer and television presenter
- Roger Pizey: Executive Pastry Chef, Fortnum & Mason
- Mark Flanagan: Buckingham Palace Head Chef
- Jane Dunn: Food writer, author and baker
- Liam Charles: Baker, author and TV presenter
- Matt Adlard: Pastry Chef
- Monica Galetti: Chef proprietor of Mere, TV presenter and judge on MasterChef: The Professionals
- Regula Ysewijn: Culinary historian, author and judge on Bake Off in Belgium
- Rahul Mandal: The Great British Bake Off winner 2018

=== Timeline ===
The competition opened for entries from 10 January to 4 February, with the first round of judging overseen by the Fortnum & Mason chefs commencing on 7 February. The second round of the competition saw 30–50 entries being shared with each judge who nominated their top three. The third round of the competition saw the judges select their top five to go through to the final. The competition final saw five finalists invited to attend the live final at Fortnum & Mason during the week of 14 March.

The winner was announced on 12 May in the BBC One documentary The Jubilee Pudding: 70 Years in the Baking, which also saw the Duchess of Cornwall in attendance. The winning recipe was a lemon Swiss roll and amaretti trifle created by Jemma Melvin.

== Winning recipe ==
The winning recipe, by Jemma Melvin from Southport, was "Jemma's lemon Swiss roll and Amaretti trifle". The recipe is for 20 servings. Melvin points out that the lemon curd, jelly, Amaretti biscuits and custard can be bought ready-made, while the Swiss roll and mandarin coulis should be made from scratch.

== See also ==
- Jubilee chicken
- Coronation chicken
- Coronation quiche
- Victoria sponge
- Windsor soup
