= Marthe Distel =

French journalist (1871–1934)

Marthe Marie Joséphine Distel
- Born: 1871
- Died: 1934 (aged 62–63)

Marthe Marie Joséphine Distel (French pronunciation: [maʁt distɛl]; 18 September 1871, Remiremont — 1 April 1934, Saint-Leu-la-Forêt) was a French journalist.

== Career ==
Marthe Distel started the culinary magazine La Cuisinière Cordon Bleu. To prompt readership, Distel offered subscribers cooking lessons with professional chefs. The first class was held in January 1895 in the kitchens of the Palais Royal. The classes led to the development of a more formal school, now known as Le Cordon Bleu.

== Heritage ==
On her death in 1934, at age 62, Distel left the school to an orphanage, which struggled to manage it. The school closed during World War II, and was later bought by another French woman, Élisabeth Brassart.

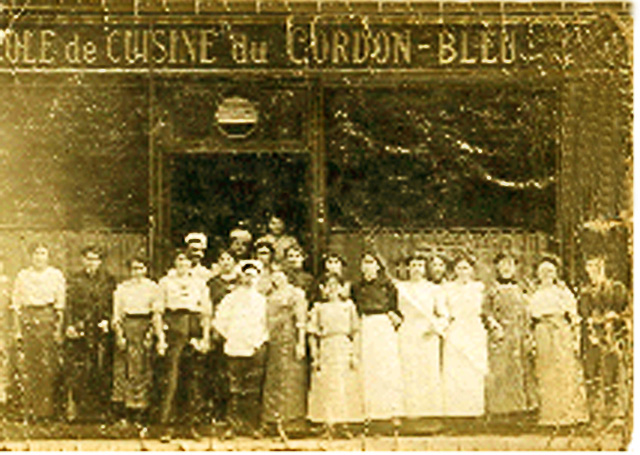
Marthe Distel and Henri-Paul Pellaprat with their students in front of the L'école du Cordon Bleu in 1896

The magazine ceased publication in the 1960s, but the school has evolved from its single location in Paris to more than 27 schools in 17 countries.
