= Sarasota Woman's Exchange =

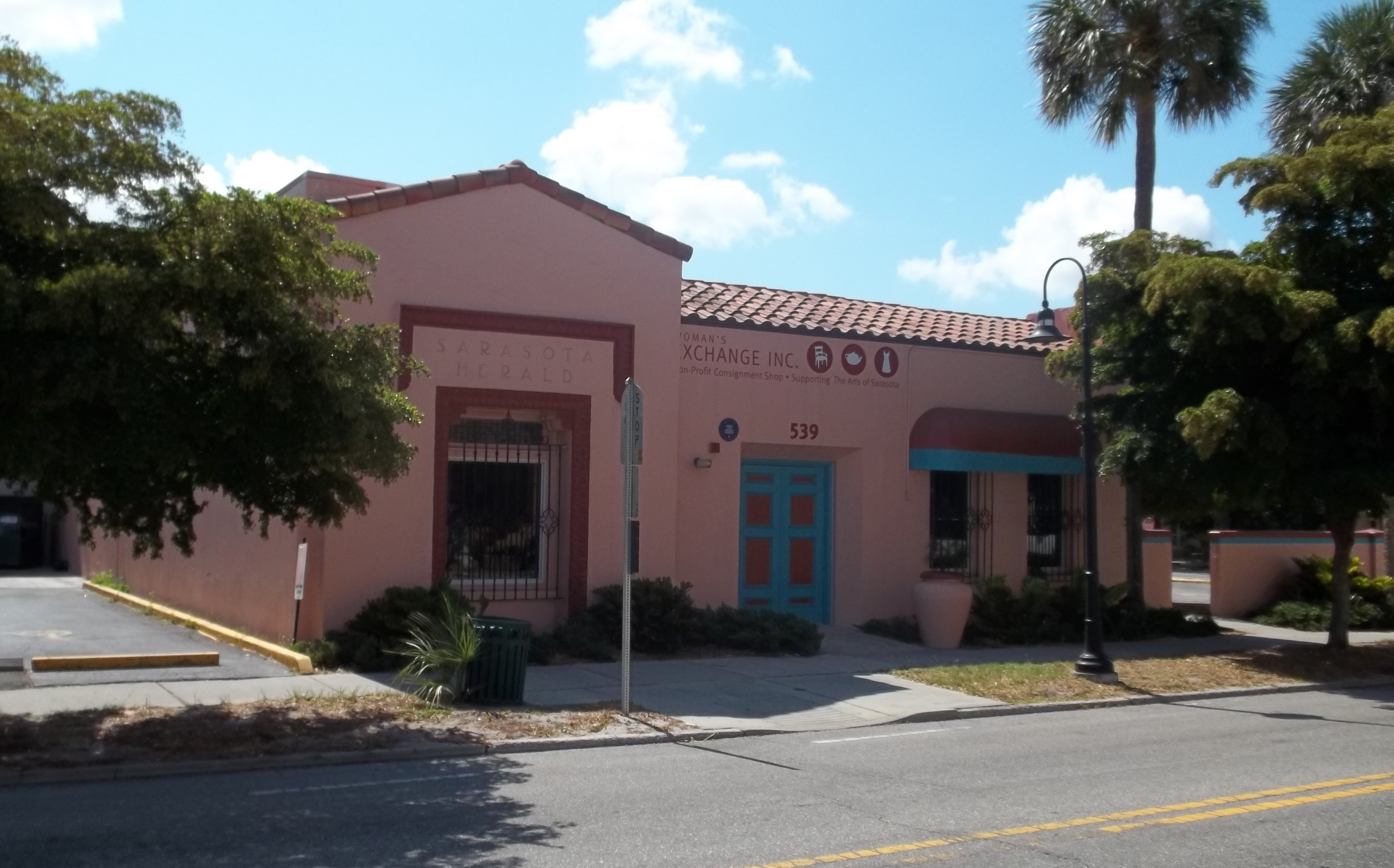
Sarasota Herald building, now the Woman's Exchange, in 2011

The Sarasota Woman's Exchange is an organization in Sarasota, Florida. Founded in 1962, its subsequent expansion prompted several moves in its early years. It finally found a permanent home in 1969 after purchasing and renovating the Sarasota Herald Building.

It runs a consignment shop to raise money for community projects and grants. It is staffed by volunteers.
