= Jubilee chicken =

Dish created to celebrate the jubilees of British monarchs

Jubilee chicken can refer to one of several chicken dishes created to celebrate the jubilees of different British monarchs.

== Silver Jubilee chicken ==
Jubilee chicken was created for the Silver Jubilee of George V in 1935, and was based on chicken dressed with mayonnaise and curry powder.

== Golden Jubilee chicken ==
The second version of Jubilee chicken was created for Elizabeth II's Golden Jubilee in 2002 by chefs at Buckingham Palace. This version was radically different from coronation chicken and was highly publicised at the time as a modern evolution of coronation chicken. Jubilee chicken was distributed in hampers to guests at the concerts for the Golden Jubilee. In spite of both of these, its popularity has remained relatively limited compared to coronation chicken.

Golden Jubilee chicken is a cold dish consisting of pieces of chicken in a sauce garnished with parsley and lime segments. The sauce is a mixture of crème fraiche and mayonnaise flavoured with lime and ginger; the chicken is also marinated in a combination of lime and ginger before being mixed with the sauce. It is recommended to be served with pasta salad. Like coronation chicken, Jubilee chicken can be served as a sandwich filling.

== Diamond Jubilee chicken ==
For Elizabeth II's Diamond Jubilee in 2012, guests at the Royal Garden Party were served "Diamond Jubilee Chicken", a variation of coronation chicken created by Heston Blumenthal. This recipe updates Coronation chicken with Indian spices, mayonnaise, shredded chicken, coriander, and nigella seeds.

== See also ==
- Platinum Pudding
- List of chicken dishes
