= Patricia Easterbrook Roberts =

Australian-born floral designer, author and landscape designer

- Born: March 17, 1910; Glebe, New South Wales, Australia
- Died: December 27, 1987 (aged 77)
- Known for: Floral design; landscape design

Patricia Easterbrook Roberts (March 17, 1910 – December 27, 1987) was an Australian-born floral designer, author, and landscape designer who worked in Australia, England and the United States.

== Early life ==
Roberts was born Patricia Mary Easterbrook on March 17, 1910, in Glebe, a suburb of Sydney, New South Wales, Australia, the daughter of Isaac Edwin Easterbrook and his wife Matilda Mary (née Draper). In 1929, aged 19, she accompanied her mother on a trip around the world, during which they visited many famous gardens and greenhouses in England, continental Europe, and the United States, inspiring Roberts' lifelong interest in floral design.

== Career ==
In 1930, Roberts bought a floristry shop in Sydney which she operated for almost two years. Returning to Europe, she managed several flower shops in London and Paris. During the late 1930s, she worked for well-known florists Irene Hayes (at her Flower Store on Park Avenue, New York), and Constance Spry (helping organize Spry's lecture tour in the United States, and arrangements for Spry's New York flower shop).

During the early 1940s, Roberts operated the Roberts School of Dramatic Floriculture in Detroit, Michigan. She also had a weekly radio program on flower care and arranging, and wrote a monthly column for the industry journal FTD News. In 1945 she published her first book, Technical Floristry, believed to be the first textbook for professional florists written in the United States. The book was made into a color training film by the industry association Florists' Telegraph Delivery Association (FTD).

Seven other books followed Technical Floristry, and chapters by Roberts appeared in several books, such as The Studio Book of Flowers and Flower Arrangements. The Kirkus Reviews noted that Flower Craft (1949) had "Plenty of helpful lists ... sound advice ... with some original ideas." The Book of Table Arrangements (1951) was described as "a "goldmine" for hostesses". An arrangement from Flower Arrangements Throughout the Year appeared on the cover of the Australian Women's Weekly in 1963; Roberts was described as "world famous as a lecturer on flower arrangements". The journal Design considered How to Make Flower Decorations (1958) "the authoritative book on the subject", and Interior Design wrote that the "easy instructions are spiced with so much common sense". Her last book, Table Settings, Entertaining & Etiquette, was published simultaneously in the US (by Viking) and in the UK (by Thames & Hudson). It was well received in both countries, with one reviewer describing it as "a fascinating mixture of the social history of the dining room and practical advice on all kinds of entertaining", and another saying it "the book is both a visual delight and an infallible guide to correct procedure".

Roberts' work was also featured in popular magazines of the period, including Look, House Beautiful, Woman’s Day, Town and Country, and Life, which in 1956 carried a 6 page color spread of floral arrangements designed for it by Roberts. In addition, she appeared in and did arrangements and table settings for live lectures across the US and internationally. as well as radio and television programs and movies. In 1950 she was a commentator for the first televised broadcast of the New York Flower Show.

Roberts also designed floral-themed interior decorations for established European manufacturers and their importers, including W.H.Bossons (plaster mirrors and plaques made in England); The Walter Hatches (painted wrought iron & glazed ceramics made in Italy); John Beswick Ltd.(porcelain & brassware made in England); S.P. Skinner Co. (pewter & brassware made in England): and Pierson, Page & Jewsbury Co. (brassware & pewter made in England). She established the Patricia Roberts Studio in Stamford, Connecticut, to sell her own floral-themed interior decorations in various materials, including metal, which she also exported. She worked as a consultant on interior design and landscape design for Paparazzo Development Corporation's clustered-housing projects including Heritage Village, Connecticut, the largest planned retirement community in the northeast United States at the time.

Roberts' influential design ideas and etiquette guidelines are still referenced in the 21st century. The historical information she provided in Table Settings, Entertaining & Etiquette has been referenced by both academic studies and cookbooks with a historical theme.

== Personal life ==
In 1939, Roberts married David Edwards Roberts (an American lawyer for the Florists' Telegraph Delivery Association), with whom she had two children. Roberts and her husband divorced in 1947, and Roberts became a U.S. citizen in 1948. Roberts’ last twenty years (1967–1987) were spent living in Southbury, Connecticut. She died aged 77 of metastasized colon cancer on December 27, 1987, in a hospital in Danbury, Connecticut.

== Books ==
- Technical Floristry (Powers & Company, 1945)
- Flower Craft (Crown, 1949)
- The Book of Table Arrangements (Crown, 1951)
- Party Decorations for Christmas and Other Occasions (Crowell, 1954)
- How to Make Flower Decorations (Crowell, 1958)
- Simplified Flower Arrangements (Viking, 1960)
- Flower Arrangements Throughout the Year (Viking, 1963)
- Table Settings, Entertaining & Etiquette (Viking and Thames & Hudson, 1967)
