= Henri-Paul Pellaprat =

French chef

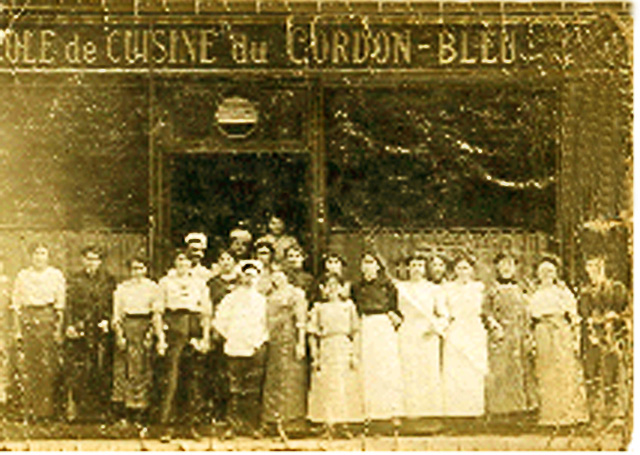
Marthe Distel and Henri-Paul Pellaprat with their students in front of l'École du Cordon Bleu in 1896

Henri-Paul Pellaprat (pronounced [ɑ̃ʁi pɔl pɛlapʁa]; Saint-Maur-des-Fossés, 1869–1954) was a French chef, founder with the journalist Marthe Distel of Le Cordon Bleu cooking school in Paris. He was the author of La cuisine familiale et pratique and other classic French cookery texts. He worked from the age of twelve as a pastry boy and then cooked at many of the most famous restaurants of La Belle Époque Paris such as the Maison Dorée. He taught at l’École du Cordon bleu for 32 years; his students including Maurice Edmond Sailland, later known as Curnonsky, and Raymond Oliver.

In 1966, after his death, his book L'Art Culinaire Moderne was translated into English and published for the American market under the name Modern French Culinary Art. It contained 2030 recipes and many color photos, covering everything from everyday casual French cooking to haute cuisine. Discussing this translation, the New York Times wrote, "one could not hardly ask for a better or more sumptuous one", adding that this book "demonstrates once again that cooking can be among the higher arts."

== Bibliography ==
Most of these books went through multiple editions, and share recipes. Date is of the first edition of each title.

- 1914, La Cuisine de tous les jours, 240 p.
- 1927, La Pâtisserie pratique, 238 p.
- 1936, L'Art culinaire moderne, 711 p., preface by Curnonsky
- 1937, La Cuisine froide, 166 p.
- 1937, Les Desserts, 195 p.
- 1937, Les Menus détaillés de la ménagère, 230 p.
- 1937, Manuel de la cuisine végétarienne et de régimes, 176 p.
- 1941, 390 recettes de cuisine pour les restrictions alimentaires, 176 p.
- 1942, Le Cuisinier, 45 p.
- 1945, 300 recettes de cuisine à la Cornue, 340 p.
- 1946, Cuisinons vite et bien, 140 recettes destinées à la femme qui travaille, 70 p.
- 1951, Les Oeufs, les légumes, les farinages, quelques régimes, 181 p.
- 1954, Le Poisson dans la cuisine française, 231 p.
- 1955, La Cuisine familiale, 215 p.
- 1957, Le Nouveau guide culinaire, 368 p.
- 1959, Traité de la cuisine familiale, 297 p.
- 1966, La Cuisine en 20 leçons, 320 p.
