= Norman Wilkinson (stage designer) =

English stage designer (1882–1934)

Norman Wilkinson (8 August 1882 in Handsworth Wood – 14 February 1934 in London) was an English stage designer.

He was educated at the New School and the Birmingham School of Art.

Wilkinson designed scenery and costumes for Granville Barker at the Duke of York's Theatre and the Savoy Theatre. In the Savoy production of A Midsummer Night's Dream, his costumes for the fairies included gilded faces and wigs, a choice which received some criticism. He also did work for the Phoenix Society.

He referred to himself as "Norman Wilkinson of Four Oaks" to distinguish himself from the artist Norman Wilkinson. When he died, on 15 February 1934, some newspapers reported that it was the artist who had died.
