= Le Cordon Bleu =

French hospitality and culinary education institution

- Type: Culinary school
- Established: 1895; 131 years ago
- Location: Worldwide
- Website: www.cordonbleu.edu

Le Cordon Bleu ([lə kɔʁdɔ̃ blø]; French: "The Blue Ribbon"; LCB) is a French hospitality and culinary education institution, teaching haute cuisine. Its educational focuses are hospitality management, culinary arts, and gastronomy. The institution consists of 35 institutes in 20 countries and has over 20,000 attendees.

== History ==
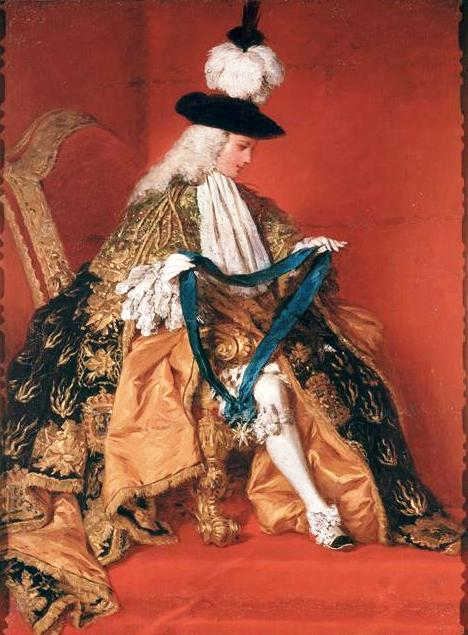
Duc de Saint-Aignan holding the Blue Ribbon with the Order of the Holy Spirit.

The origin of the school name derives, indirectly, from the French Royal and Catholic Order of the Holy Spirit. This was a select group of the French nobility that had been knighted. The first creation of Royal Knights at the French Court was performed in 1578. The French Order of the Holy Spirit was for many centuries the highest distinction of the French Kingdom. Each member was awarded the Cross of the Holy Spirit, which hung from a blue silk ribbon. According to one story, this group became known for its extravagant and luxurious banquets, known as "cordons bleus". At the time of the French Revolution, the monarchy and the Order were abolished, but the name remained synonymous with excellent French cooking. By the nineteenth century the blue ribbon had become synonymous with excellence. The name was adopted by a French culinary magazine, La Cuisinière Cordon Bleu, founded by Marthe Distel in the late 19th century. The magazine began offering lessons by some of the best chefs in France.

The magazine developed into the original Le Cordon Bleu that Distel and Henri-Paul Pellaprat established in 1895 in Paris, France. In 1945, after the end of WWII, Madame Elisabeth Brassart purchased what remained of the struggling school from a Catholic orphanage which had inherited it after Distel died in the late 1930s. Brassart managed the school until 1984; at the age of 87 she retired and sold the school to André J. Cointreau, a direct descendant of the founding family of Cointreau liqueur and Rémy Martin Cognac.

== Other countries ==
In 1933, former student Dione Lucas helped to open a school under the Le Cordon Bleu name in London, Great Britain.

In the United States, 16 schools used to operate under the "Le Cordon Bleu North America" name through a licensing agreement with Career Education Corporation (CEC), a for-profit education company based in Chicago, Illinois. In 2009, the license was estimated to be worth $135 million. In 2014, Le Cordon Bleu North America generated $178.6 million in revenue and $70.6 million of operating losses.

Following the implementation of stricter "gainful employment" federal regulations by the United States Department of Education in 2015, CEC attempted to sell its 16 Le Cordon Bleu campuses after reporting substantial operating losses ($70.6 million on $178.6 million in revenue during 2014). When a buyer could not be found, CEC announced in December 2015 that all U.S. campuses would close by September 2017, affecting thousands of enrolled students.

The last new students were accepted in January 2016. In June 2016, the Securities and Exchange Commission requested documents and information regarding Career Education's fourth quarter 2014 classification of its Le Cordon Bleu campuses. The closures prompted multiple class-action lawsuits from former students alleging deceptive marketing, inflated job placement figures, and worthless credentials saddled with significant student debt. In June 2016, the Securities and Exchange Commission opened an inquiry requesting documents regarding Career Education's financial classification and accounting practices concerning the Le Cordon Bleu division.

Le Cordon Bleu has continued to maintain a presence in the United States through its New York office, Le Cordon Bleu Inc., which places students in the locations abroad.

=== Cities with schools ===
Campuses in Europe

- Paris, France
- London, Great Britain
- Madrid, Spain
- Istanbul, Turkey

Campuses in the Americas

- Brazil
  - Rio de Janeiro
  - São Paulo
- Ottawa, Ontario, Canada
- Mexico
  - Mexico City
  - Tampico
- Lima, Peru
- New York City, United States

Campuses in Oceania

- Australia
  - Adelaide
  - Brisbane
  - Melbourne
  - Sydney
- Wellington, New Zealand

Campuses in Asia

- Shanghai, China
- Beirut, Lebanon
- Gurgaon, India
- Tokyo, Japan
- Seoul, Korea
- Kuala Lumpur, Malaysia
- Kaohsiung, Taiwan
- Bangkok, Thailand
- Manila, Philippines

== In popular culture ==
Le Cordon Bleu played a central role in the 2009 American film Julie & Julia, which was partly based on Julia Child's memoir My Life in France. In addition, central protagonists in other films attended or were graduates of Le Cordon Bleu such as Audrey Hepburn's character in the 1954 American film Sabrina, Huo Ting En in the 2017 Taiwanese television series The Perfect Match, Dev D in the 2017 Bengali film Maacher Jhol and Hervé Villechaize's character Nick Nack in the 1974 James Bond film The Man with the Golden Gun.

The school also plays a central role in publications by its students. For example, American writer Kathleen Flinn's 2007 book The Sharper Your Knife, the Less You Cry, is the first insider's account of attending the modern Paris flagship school. Flinn's best-selling memoir recounts the day-to-day trials of the contemporary program and provides a further history of the school. The book was translated into several languages.

== Alumni ==
- Alumni of the Paris location include Julia Child, Csaba dalla Zorza, Giada De Laurentiis, Isabel Campabadal, Dame Mary Berry, Gastón Acurio, Teresa Ocampo, Renatta Moeloek, Jesselyn Lauwreen, Gabie Kook, Eudes Assis, and Shahrzad Shokouhivand.
- Alumni of the Los Angeles location include David Burtka, Kelis and Sicily Sewell.
- Alumni of the Pasadena location include Charity Morgan and Evan Funke.
- Alumni of the London location include Princess Marie-Astrid of Liechtenstein.

== See also ==
- Cooking schools
- French cuisine
