= Jeremiah Tower =

American celebrity chef

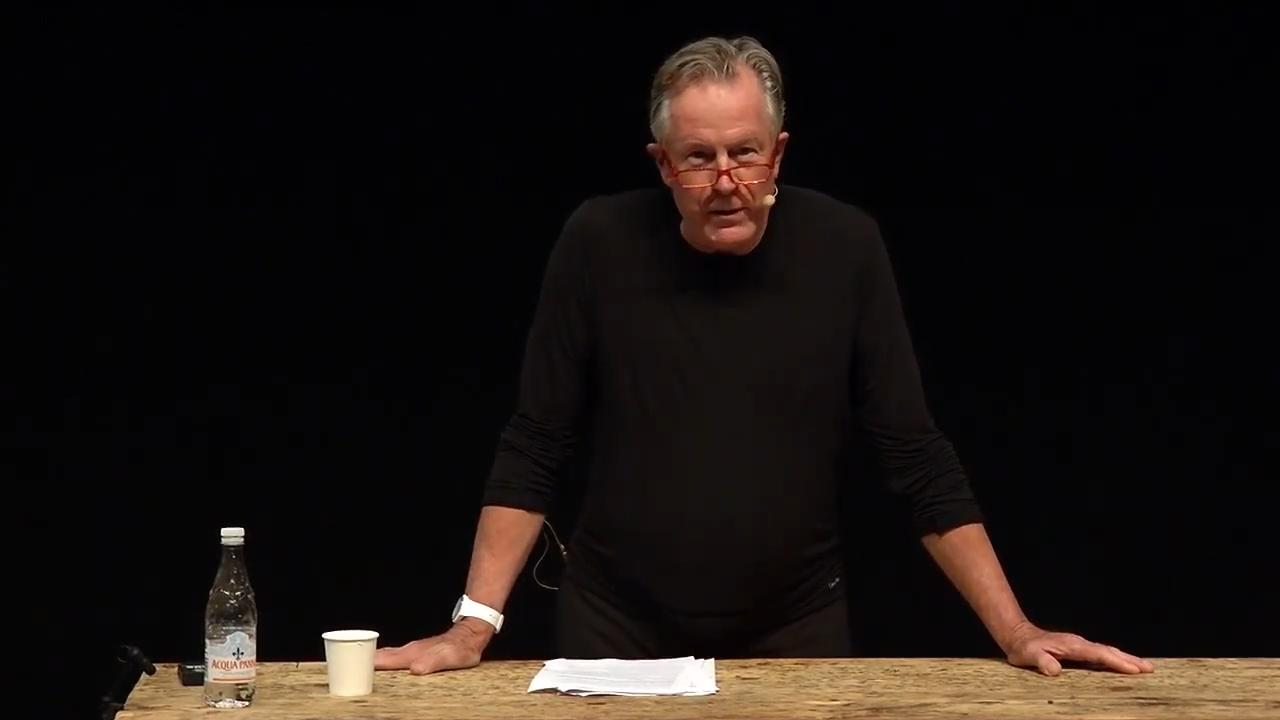
- Tower in 2015
- Born: 1942 (age 83–84); Stamford, Connecticut, U.S.
- Education: Harvard University (BA); Harvard Graduate School of Design (MArch)
- Occupations: Chef; restaurateur
- Spouse: Curtis Cox (m. 2020)
- Culinary career
- Cooking style: Califiornia
- Previous restaurants: * Chez Panisse, Berkeley * Balboa Cafe, San Francisco * Santa Fe Bar and Grill, Berkeley * Stars Restaurant, various locations * J.T.'s Bistro, San Francisco * Speedo 690 Restaurant * Tavern on the Green, New York City * Peak Cafe, Hong Kong

Jeremiah Tower (born 1942) is an American celebrity chef and restaurateur who, along with Alice Waters and Wolfgang Puck, pioneered the culinary style known as California cuisine. A food lover from childhood, he had no formal culinary education before beginning his career as a chef.

== Early life and education ==
Tower was born in 1942 in Stamford, Connecticut. The son of a managing director of an international film sound equipment company, he was educated at Saint Ignatius' College, Riverview in Sydney, Australia; at Parkside School in Surrey, England; and at Loomis Chaffee in Connecticut. He got a bachelor's degree at Harvard University and got a master's degree in architecture at the Harvard Graduate School of Design. Tower is gay.

After earning his master's degree, he had intended to pursue design, specifically of underwater structures in Hawaii because of his obsession with finding the lost city of Atlantis. But when his grandfather died, Tower, who was accustomed to being financially supported, found himself out of money and in need of employment.

== Culinary career ==
Inspired by a berry tart he had eaten at then-unknown Chez Panisse restaurant in Berkeley, California, Tower applied for a job there in 1972. His skills and brazenness recreating traditional French food led Alice Waters and her partners to hire him. Within a year, he became an equal partner with Waters and others. He was in charge of the kitchen, the menus and promotion of the restaurant.

Tower left Chez Panisse in 1978 after philosophical and business disagreements with the majority of the board and with Waters in particular (they rejected his idea to open a Panisse Cafe). He next worked at the Ventana Inn in Big Sur, then in 1980 taught briefly at the California Culinary Academy.

In 1981, Tower revived the failing Balboa Cafe in San Francisco, a restaurant owned by Cathe and Doyle Moon. In 1982, he became chef at Santa Fe Bar and Grill in Berkeley, California, also owned by the Moons.

In 1984, partnering with Cathe and Doyle Moon, Tower opened Stars, which became one of the top-grossing restaurants in the Bay Area. Tower opened branches of the restaurant in Oakville (Napa Valley), Palo Alto, Manila, and Singapore. Numerous American future celebrity chefs worked in the Stars network, including Mario Batali, George Francisco, Dominique Crenn, Joey Altman and Brendan Walsh, as well as pastry chefs Emily Luchetti and Jerry Traunfeld.

In the 1990s, Tower owned a cafe in Hong Kong, the Peak Cafe, as well as various related ventures in San Francisco that included a more casual cafe, an upscale bistro and a kitchenware shop. As his fame grew, he licensed his name and earned celebrity endorsement contracts, including one for Dewar's Scotch. In 1998, Tower sold part of his interest in the Stars restaurants to a Singapore-based real estate company. The new owners closed Stars after two years of operation.

Tower moved to Manila for a year and then to New York City for four years, followed by a move to Italy and then Mexico. In 2014, Tower was hired as executive chef of Tavern on the Green in New York City but left in April 2015 after six months.

== Personal life ==
Tower is married to his husband Curtis Cox since 2020.

== Filmography ==
In 2016, the biographical documentary Jeremiah Tower: The Last Magnificent, directed by Lydia Tenaglia and produced by Anthony Bourdain and Zero Point Zero productions, premiered at the Tribeca Film Festival. The 100-minute film was bought by The Orchard for US distribution in 2017. On November 12, 2017, the film was broadcast on CNN.

In 2017, Tower appeared on Top Chef, the Rick Stein-presented BBC TV show Road to Mexico, the CRAVE wine and food festival in Spokane, Washington, as guest of honor at Chef's Roll in Miami Beach, and as a judge at the Basque Culinary Center World Awards in Mexico City.

== Previous restaurants ==
These are restaurants Tower was associated with.

=== California locations ===
- Chez Panisse, Berkeley, California, worked here from 1972 –1978;
- La Ventana Inn and Spa, Big Sur, California, worked here from 1978;
- Balboa Cafe, Fillmore district, San Francisco, California, worked here from 1981 to 1982.
- Santa Fe Bar and Grill, Berkeley, California, worked here from 1982 to 1986.
- Stars Restaurant, Civic Center neighborhood, San Francisco, California, operated from 1984 –1999, sold in 1998 to Andrew Yap but Tower stays on as creative consultant.
- Stars Cafe, Civic Center, San Francisco, California, operated from 1988 to 1998, located near the original Stars location but more casual.
- Stars Restaurant, Palo Alto, California, operated from 1995 –1997.
- Stars Restaurant, Oakville, California, operated from 1993 to 1997.
- J.T.'s Bistro, San Francisco, California, operated from 1996 to 1997.
- Speedo 690 Restaurant, San Francisco, California, operated from 1989 to 1991.

=== Other locations ===
- Tavern on the Green, New York City, New York.
- Peak Cafe, Hong Kong.
- Stars Restaurant, Manila, Philippines, opened in 1999.
- Stars Restaurant, Singapore, operated from 1996 to 1998.

== Awards and honors ==
In 1985, Tower was named in Who's Who in American Cooking by Cook’s Magazine. Tower's first book, New American Classics, won a James Beard Foundation Award in 1986 for "Best American Regional Cookbook".

Tower won the James Beard Foundation Award for "Best Chef in California" in 1993 and "Outstanding Chef of the Year" in 1996.

In 2017, Jeremiah Tower was appointed a Founding Patron of the Oxford Cultural Collective, an educational body specializing in hospitality and gastronomy.

== Bibliography ==
In addition to writing two books in 2016, Tower was the key speaker at the Ken Hom lecture series at Oxford Brookes University.

- Tower, Jeremiah (1986). Jeremiah Tower's New American Classics. Harper & Row. ISBN 9780061818783.
- Tower, Jeremiah (2002). Jeremiah Tower Cooks: 250 Recipes from an American Master. Harry N. Abrams. ISBN 978-1584792307.
- Pellaprat, Henri-Paul; Tower, Jeremiah (2003). The Great Book of French Cuisine: Revised Edition. Vendome Press. ISBN 978-0865652316.
- Tower, Jeremiah (2003). America's Best Chefs Cook with Jeremiah Tower. Wiley. ISBN 978-0471451419.
- Frasier, Clark; Gaier, Mark; Alexander, Max (2003). The Arrows Cookbook: Cooking and Gardening from Maine's Most Beautiful Farmhouse Restaurant. Foreword by Jeremiah Tower. Scribner. ASIN B0058M5ADC.
- Villas, James (2004). Stalking the Green Fairy: And Other Fantastic Adventures in Food and Drink. Foreword by Jeremiah Tower. Wiley. ISBN 978-0471273448.
- Tower, Jeremiah (2004). California Dish: What I Saw (and Cooked) at the American Culinary Revolution. Free Press. ISBN 978-0743228459.
- Tower, Jeremiah (2016). Table Manners: How to Behave in the Modern World and Why Bother. Farrar, Straus and Giroux. ISBN 978-0374272340.
- Tower, Jeremiah (2017). Start the Fire: How I Began A Food Revolution In America. Harper Collins. ISBN 978-0062498434.
