= George Francisco =

American chef (born 1966)

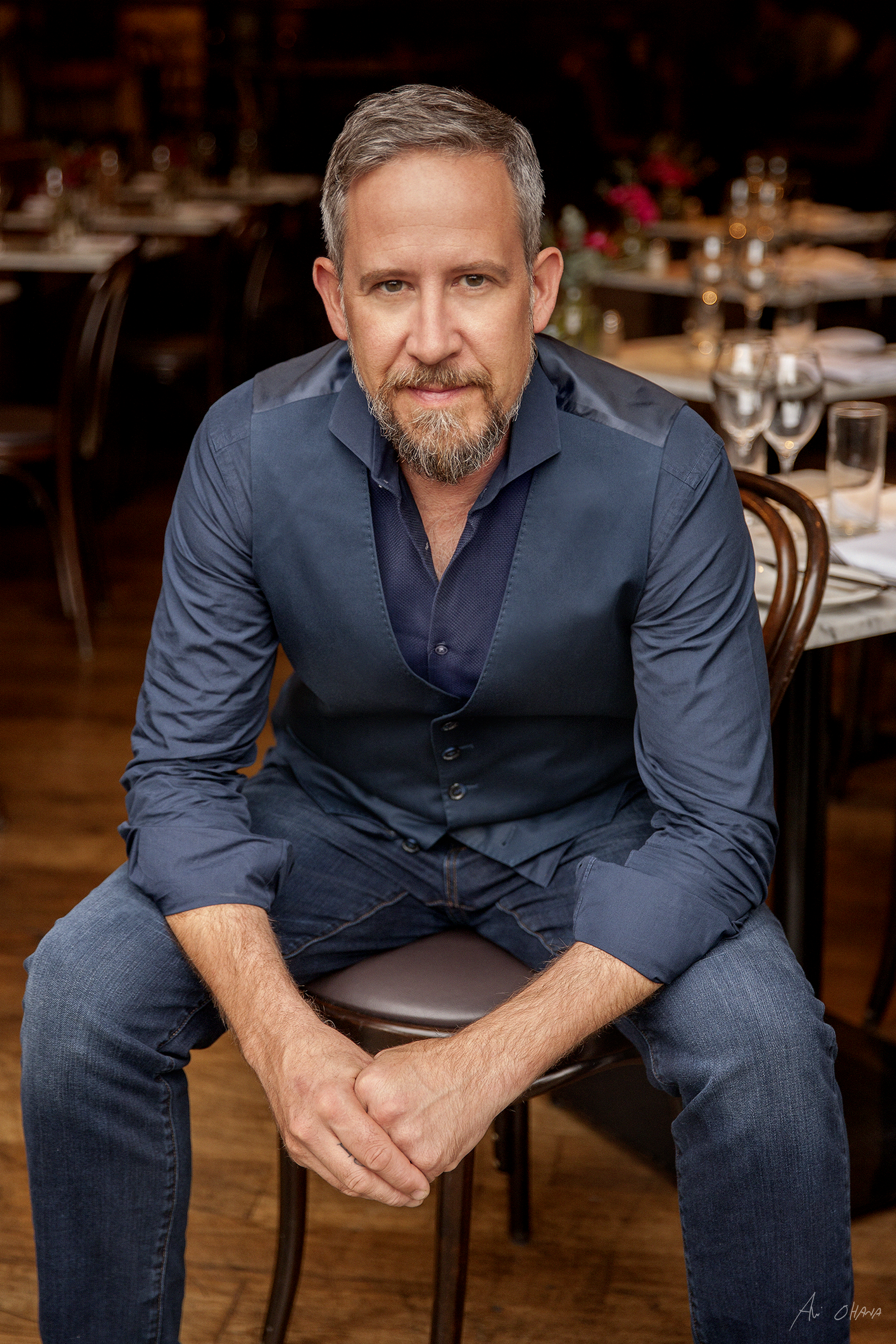
- Born: 1966 (age 59–60); Biloxi, Mississippi
- Occupations: Executive chef, restaurant consultant, bacon artisan, writer
- Website: voodoobacon.com.au

George Francisco is an American chef based in Sunshine Coast Region, Australia. Francisco started his culinary career in the US and then moved to Australia in 2001.

== Early life ==
Francisco was born in Biloxi, Mississippi and raised in the US South.

== Career ==
=== In the US ===
Francisco started his culinary career in Williamsburg, Virginia working under Marcel Desaulniers. After finishing his apprenticeship, he moved to San Francisco, where he worked with Cindy Pawlcyn at the Fog City Diner and then at Stars under Jeremiah Tower. While in the US, he also worked at Cafe Claude, YOYO in the Miyako Hotel, and Farallon Restaurant, where he became the Chef de cuisine.

=== In Australia ===
He moved to Australia in 2001 to open Wildfire Restaurant. He then opened his own restaurant called Dish. While at Dish, he earned four chef's hats in the Sydney Morning Herald's Good Food Guide. During this time he opened the Chelsea Tea House in Avalon. Next, he joined Jonah's Whale Beach as executive chef. He earned three more chefs hats while working at Jonah's. While at Jonah's, his culinary guidance assisted in the hotel becoming part of the prestigious Relais & Châteaux group. He then conceptualised the hospitality offering for the QT Hotels & Resorts as Executive Chef.

George hosted an episode of Food Safari in 2008.

In 2011, Francisco moved to Hunter Valley and became the executive chef at Relais & Châteaux property Tower Estate, which comprised Tower Lodge, Restaurant Nine, Peppers Convent and Roberts Circa 1876. He is an advocate for the concept of reducing Food miles, which measures the distance food travels between production and consumption. In 2012, he established an organic kitchen on the estate to source ingredients for the restaurant. Later, he increased the area covered by the garden and also established a small chicken farm and beehives. At this time Francisco was the only Executive Chef to work for two Relais & Châteaux properties in Australia.

In 2014, after the sale of Tower Lodge and Restaurant Nine, Francisco focused his attention on Roberts Circa 1876. George founded restaurant Eighty Eight, an all organic and sustainable restaurant on the estate.

In 2015, George was featured on an episode of Foraged.

In 2015, George relocated to Queensland to establish his own artisanal bacon company, Voodoo Bacon.

In 2018–2020, George worked with Wildfire alumni Ian Dresener and Dah Lee to launch Firegrill Restaurant on Barrack Street, Sydney CBD.

In 2020, George launched his personal range of ready to heat, chef made meals and a spice and rub line under his George's Soul Kitchen brand.
