= Tavern on the Green =

Restaurant in Central Park, New York City

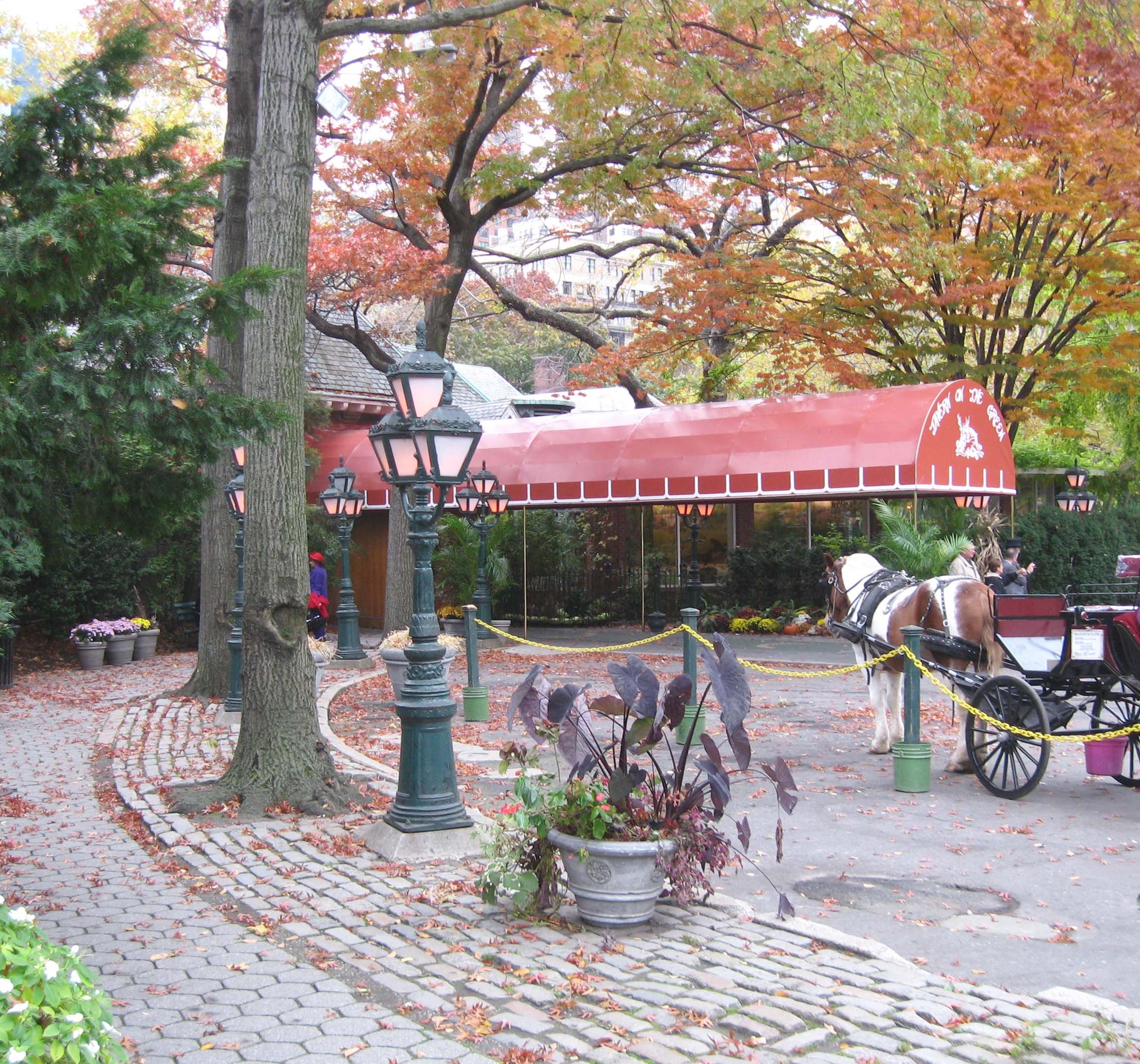
- Main entrance of Tavern on the Green, November 2008
- Interactive map of Tavern on the Green

Restaurant information
- Established: October 1934
- Owners: Jim Caiola and David Salama
- Head chef: Bill Peet
- Location: near Central Park West and West 66th Street, New York (Upper West Side, Manhattan), New York, 10023, United States
- Coordinates: 40.7723°N 73.9778°W
- Other information: open: 1934–2009, 2014–present
- Website: tavernonthegreen.com

Notable buildings and structures of Central Park. Click on the map and then on the points for details.

Tavern on the Green is an American cuisine restaurant in Central Park in Manhattan, New York City, near the intersection of Central Park West and West 66th Street on the Upper West Side. The restaurant, housed in a former sheepfold, has been operated by Jim Caiola and David Salama since 2014.

From its opening in 1934 to its closure in 2009, the restaurant changed ownership several times. From 2010 until 2012, the building was used as a public visitor center and gift shop run by the New York City Department of Parks and Recreation. After a multimillion-dollar renovation, the Tavern was reopened in 2014.

Throughout its history, Tavern on the Green has been frequented by prominent actors, musicians, politicians, and writers. It has also received several awards, including those for the best restaurant on the Upper West Side, and the best wine menu.

== History ==
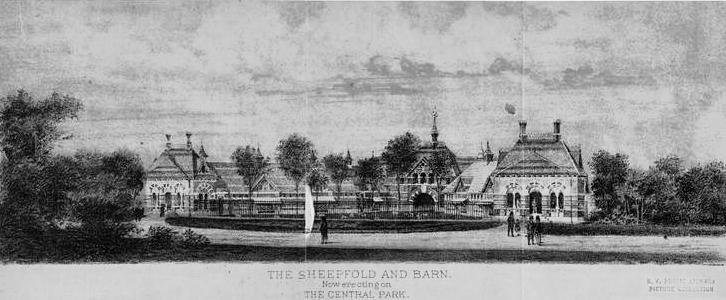
Original sheepfold and barn, 1899

The restaurant building was originally the sheepfold for the sheep that grazed Sheep Meadow, built in 1870 based on a design by Calvert Vaux and Jacob Wrey Mould. The sheep were evicted from the sheepfold in 1934 under New York City Department of Parks and Recreation (NYC Parks) commissioner Robert Moses.

=== 1930s to 1970s ===
From 1934, the restaurant was managed by restaurateurs licensed by NYC Parks. In 1943, Arnold Schleifer and his nephews, Arthur Schleifer and Julius Berman, won the contract to operate the restaurant. The owners enlarged the dance floor and offered nightly music. A large outdoor patio offered dining al fresco. Trees were first wrapped in the well-known twinkling lights around the property and the Elm Tree Room was built to surround one of the city's classic American elms. The menu was designed to be elegant but affordable for New Yorkers. Luncheon and dinner offerings changed regularly and Berman would often add special desserts to celebrate family events, such as "Parfait Ruth" to honor the birth of his granddaughter.

One of the more controversial projects proposed in Central Park during the mid-20th century was a 1956 dispute over a parking lot for Tavern on the Green. The controversy placed Moses, an urban planner known for displacing families for other large projects around the city, against a group of mothers who frequented a wooded hollow at the site of a parking lot. Despite opposition from the parents, Moses approved the destruction of part of the hollow. Demolition work commenced after Central Park was closed for the night and was only halted after a threat of a lawsuit.

In 1962 Joe Baum's Restaurant Associates purchased the Schleifer-Berman interest in the Tavern's operation.

In 1974 Warner LeRoy took over the restaurant's lease and reopened it in 1976 after $10 million in renovations, including the addition of a glass-enclosed Crystal Room overlooking the restaurant's garden (one of several dining rooms), which doubled the seating capacity to 800. From LeRoy's death in 2001 until the restaurant's renovation in 2009, Tavern on the Green was managed by LeRoy's daughter, Jennifer Oz LeRoy.

=== 1980s to 2000s: Issues and rebirth ===
In July 1983, a dozen youths leaving a nearby concert robbed patrons and stole a cash register.

Tavern on the Green is next to the finish line of the New York City Marathon. The Barilla Marathon Eve Dinner, a pre-race pasta party on the eve of the marathon for 10,000 guests (including registrants, who attend for free), took place at the Tavern in 2005.

By 2007, the restaurant had gross revenues of $38 million, from more than 500,000 visitors. This made it the second-highest-grossing independent restaurant in the United States (behind Tao Asian Bistro in Las Vegas, at $67 million).

In June 2008, Tavern on the Green agreed to pay $2.2 million to settle a sexual and racial discrimination lawsuit over claims by the Equal Employment Opportunity Commission of "pervasive harassment" of women and minority employees.

=== 2009–2014: Closure and reuse ===
On August 28, 2009, NYC Parks announced that it had declined to renew the restaurant's license, granting it instead to Dean Poll, operator of the Central Park Boathouse. The LeRoy management was required to cease operations and remove all furnishings from the location before January 1, 2010. Tavern on the Green had its last seating on December 31, 2009. It auctioned off its interior decorations and closed its doors. Poll was given rights to reopen the restaurant but could not reach an agreement with the Hotel and Motel Trades Council, affiliated with the AFL–CIO, which represents the employees of the restaurant.

In September 2009, the restaurant filed for Chapter 11 bankruptcy protection in the United States District Court for the Southern District of New York, citing the Great Recession and the loss of the restaurant's operating license. The rights to the name of the restaurant became a source of contention between the LeRoys and the city during the bankruptcy court procedures in October 2009, after the LeRoys claimed the trademark was theirs while the city challenged them. At the time the trademark was appraised at $19 million. In November 2009, Poll registered a backup name with New York State: "Tavern in the Park." In March 2010, Judge Miriam Goldman Cedarbaum ruled that the trade name was owned by the City of New York and that Warner LeRoy had trademarked the name fraudulently in 1981. She wrote: "Because the undisputed facts show that the city established and continuously maintained a restaurant under the name 'Tavern on the Green' at the same location in New York's Central Park since 1934, the city has a protectable interest in that name."

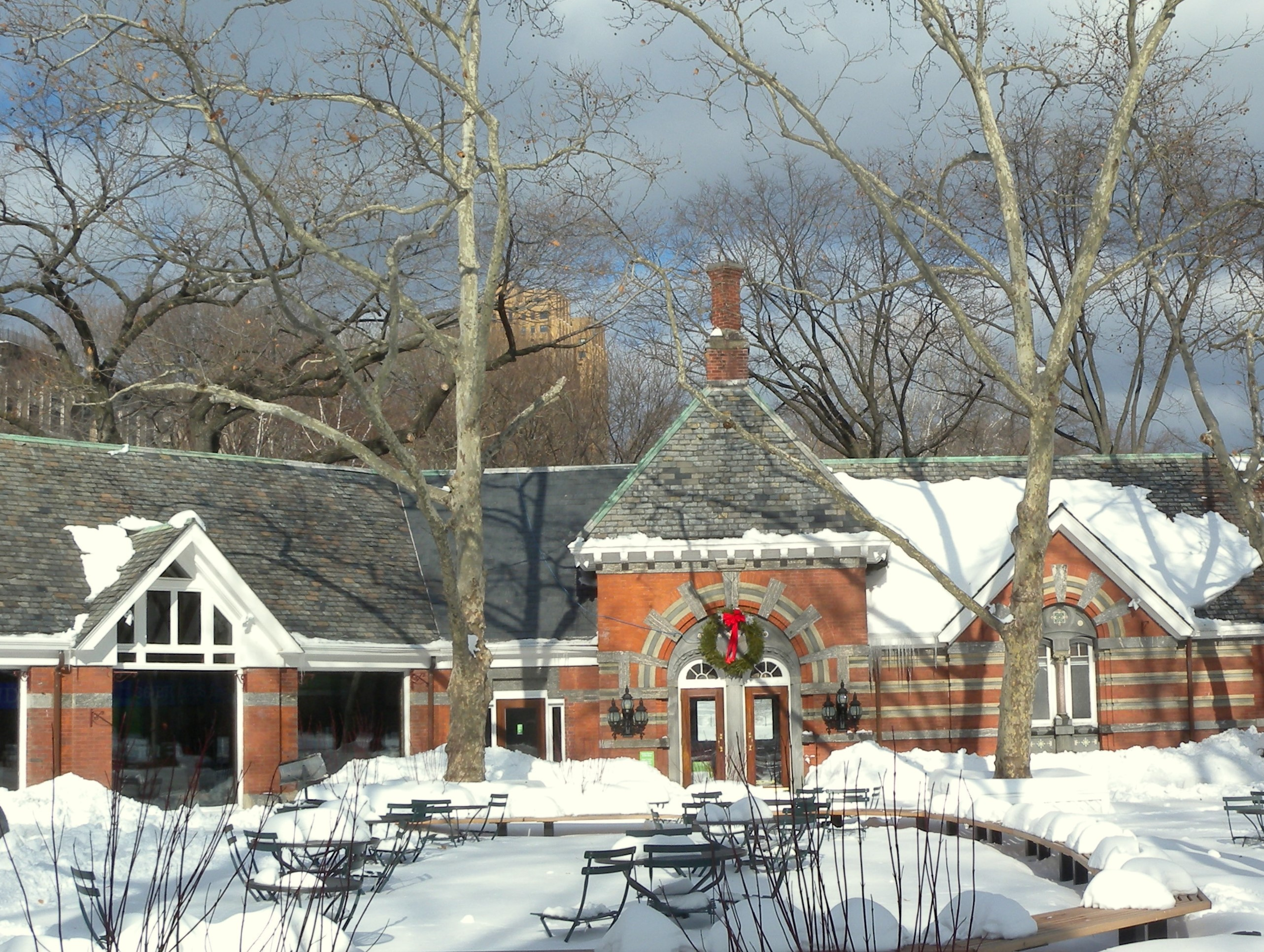
Tavern on the Green patio after reopening, December 2010

On October 15, 2010, the city re-opened the building as a visitors' information center with a gift shop selling city-themed T-shirts, hats and other memorabilia. Street vendors sold food outside. The glass-enclosed Crystal Room was removed in 2010, exposing the original 19th-century architecture.

Later in 2011, the street vendors stationed in Tavern on the Green's courtyard were given notice that their operating contracts would not be renewed. After food truck operators left the site, construction, "basic stabilization and renovation work" according to the city, began on the building. In February 2012, the city hosted a walk around for potential operators of a new Tavern on the Green. The new restaurant was presented as a more casual restaurant than its predecessor and would be housed in a renovated building which reflected its initial design as a sheepfold. There would be no hanging lights in the trees and the restaurant would close at 1:00 a.m., at the same time the park closes.

=== 2014–present: Reopening ===
The new owners announced that Tavern on the Green would reopen for dinner on April 24, 2014, followed by a grand opening on May 13, 2014, after which the restaurant began also serving brunch and lunch. Jim Caiola, one of the new managing partners, stated that the tavern's new interior would be more reminiscent of "old New York" than more recent incarnations, featuring dark wood paneling and a more open, bucolic feel. The new owners secured the restaurant location rent-free from the city until 2019.

In the wake of reopening, the restaurant cycled through head chefs. Katy Sparks was head chef at reopening. She was replaced by celebrity chef Jeremiah Tower after half a year. This was Tower's first restaurant in 15 years, since he closed his Stars restaurant in San Francisco and retired. Half a year later, Tower left to be replaced by John Stevenson, who survived a year. Stevenson was then replaced by Bill Peet in 2016.

== Awards ==
Where magazine named Tavern on the Green the best restaurant on the Upper West Side in 2006. It had also been awarded "best ambience" of any New York City restaurant four years earlier. In 2003 and 2004, Wine Spectator named the restaurant's wine list its "Best Award of Excellence."

== Notable visitors ==
Tavern on the Green was frequented by prominent actors, musicians, politicians. and writers. It hosted the wedding receptions of several prominent Americans, including one of the seven marriages of author Robert Olen Butler (later divorced) and film director Walter Hill. John Lennon and his son Sean Lennon celebrated numerous birthdays at Tavern on the Green during the late 1970s. In 1987 the tavern was the site of a star-studded memorial dinner for director-choreographer Bob Fosse.

== See also ==
- List of restaurants in New York City
