= Jerry Traunfeld =

American chef and author

Jerry Traunfeld is an American chef and author who served as the executive chef of The Herbfarm restaurant in Woodinville, Washington from July 1990 to November 2007. Prior to that he was the executive chef of the Alexis Hotel in Seattle and a pastry chef at Jeremiah Tower's Stars in San Francisco.

Traunfeld was the 2000 winner of the James Beard Award for "Best American Chef: Northwest and Hawaii." He is the author of The Herbfarm Cookbook, Simon & Schuster, and The Herbal Kitchen: Cooking with Fragrace and Flavor, HarperCollins. He has appeared on Martha Stewart Living, Better Homes and Gardens, The Splendid Table, Top Chef Masters (season 2), and other American television and radio programs. Traunfeld is a native of Silver Spring, Maryland and a graduate of the California Culinary Academy.

== Poppy ==
Traunfeld announced in December 2007 the name of his new restaurant opening in Seattle in the second half of 2008—Poppy, named after his mother. "Food will still be inspired by herbs, and will delve deep into spices. Rather than the rarefied Herbfarm style, it'll be food we can eat on an everyday basis -- and with Traunfeld's track record of deliciousness, we just might." - Seattle P.I 31 December 2007. Poppy opened its doors late in 2008 at 622 Broadway East (at Roy). The restaurant served Traunfeld's local and seasonal-emphasized cuisine in a small dish tasting format, inspired by Indian Thali. Traunfeld retired and closed the restaurant in 2019.

== Personal life ==
Traunfeld is married to Stephen Hudson and advocates for the International Gay and Lesbian Human Rights Commission. He also has a dog named Monty.
