= Emily Luchetti =

American pastry chef (born 1957)

- Born: 1957 (age 68–69); Emily White Underhill
- Education: Denison University, New York Restaurant School
- Known for: Pastries, desserts
- Culinary career
- Award(s) won: James Beard, Outstanding Pastry Chef (2004)

Emily Underhill Luchetti (née Emily White Underhill; born 1957) is an American pastry chef, cookbook author, and educator. She is a 2004 James Beard award-winner for Outstanding Pastry Chef.

== Biography ==
Emily Luchetti was born in 1957 and raised in Corning, New York. She attended Denison University and graduated with a B.A. degree (1979) in Sociology. She continued her studies at New York Restaurant School (now The Art Institute of New York City) in Manhattan. After graduation she lived in Paris for a year, studying under chef Gérard Pangaud. In 1984, she married investor and businessperson, Peter Luchetti.

Luchetti has worked with New York City restaurants including David Leiderman's Manhattan Market; and at Sheila Lukins and Julee Rosso's The Silver Palate. In San Francisco, Luchetti has worked at restaurants including Mark Franz and Pat Kuleto's Farallon from 1997 to 2014; Mark Franz's Waterbar from 2008 to 2014; and Stars and with Jeremiah Tower from 1987 until July 1995. She also co-owned Star Bake, a retail bakery, with Jeremiah Tower.

Luchetti is a 2004 James Beard award-winner for Outstanding Pastry Chef. In 2012, she became a James Beard Foundation "Who's Who of Food & Beverage in America" inductee.

She is Dean of the International Culinary Center, founded at the French Culinary Institute in 1984, where she has developed a state-of-the art curriculum because she desired to influence the thinking of a new generation of pastry chefs.

== Filmography ==
Luchetti has appeared on the television series Great Chefs, with appearances in Great Chefs - The Women, and Great Chefs - Great Cities. As well as appeared in the Food Network's The Ultimate Kitchen, Sweet Dreams, Cookin' Live with Sara Moulton, Essential Pepin, Martha Stewart Living, and Sara's Secrets.

== Publications ==
- Luchetti, Emily (1991). Stars Desserts. New York, NY: HarperCollins. ISBN 9780060166885.
- Luchetti, Emily (1995). Four-Star Desserts. New York, NY: HarperCollins. ISBN 9780060173159.
- Moore, Paul; Franz, Mark; Luchetti, Emily; Weiss, Lisa (2001). Farallon: The Very Best of San Francisco Seafood Cuisine. San Francisco, CA: Chronicle Books. ISBN 9780811829199.
- Luchetti, Emily (2003). A Passion for Desserts. San Francisco, CA: Chronicle Books. ISBN 9780811831789.
- Luchetti, Emily (2006). A Passion for Ice Cream. San Francisco, CA: Chronicle Books. ISBN 9780811846028.
- Luchetti, Emily; Weiss, Lisa (2011). The Fearless Baker. Little, Brown and Company. ISBN 9780316074285.
