= Brendan Walsh (chef) =

American chef (born 1959)

Brendan Walsh (born 1959) is an American chef known for southwestern cuisine. He was the original chef of Arizona 206 in New York City (from 1985 to 1988) and won the "Who's Who of Cooking in America" James Beard Foundation Award. As of 2020 he is Dean of the School of Culinary Arts at the Culinary Institute of America.

== Early life ==
Walsh grew up in the Bronx, New York City. He later moved to Ridgefield, Connecticut and attended Ridgefield High School.

== Career ==
Walsh graduated from the Culinary Institute of America in Hyde Park, New York in 1980. From there, he moved to Los Angeles and subsequently worked at Stars restaurant in San Francisco. He later moved back to New York City as executive chef at Arizona 206. There he appeared on magazines such as Food & Wine and USA Today. He worked as consulting chef in 1989 to Wet Paint, and eventually as chef at the Coyote Grill in Island Park from 1990 to 1991. 1991 to 1993, he was the co-owner and chef of the North Street Grill in Great Neck.

In 1996, he moved to Ridgefield, Connecticut, opening the Elms Restaurant and Tavern (now called Brendan's at the Elms). The Elms Restaurant was featured in the Thanksgiving special of Martha Stewart.
