= Poppy (restaurant) =

Defunct restaurant in Seattle, Washington, U.S.

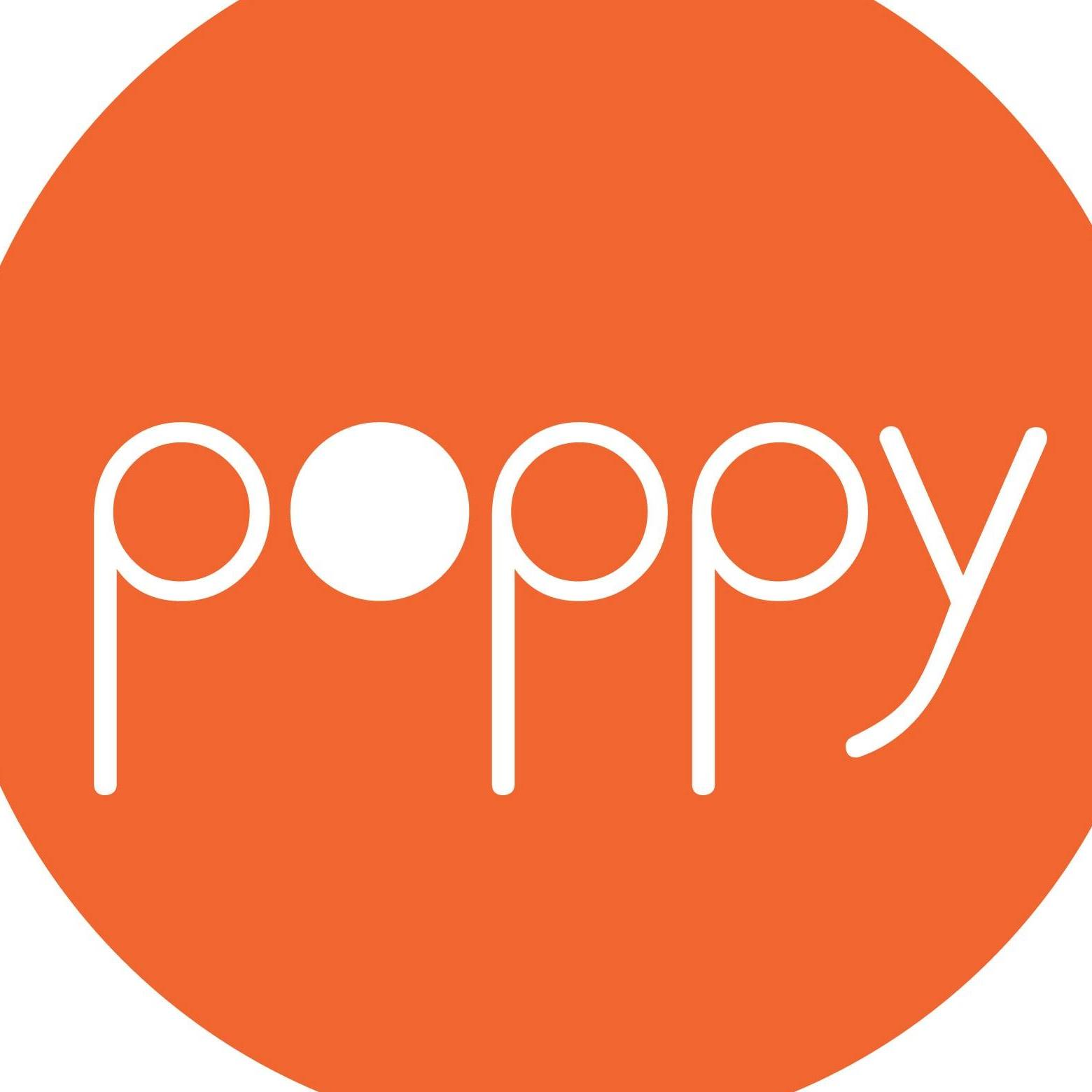
- Interactive map of Poppy

Restaurant information
- Food type: American; Continental; Indian; New American
- Location: Seattle, King, Washington, United States
- Coordinates: 47°37′30″N 122°19′14.5″W

Poppy was a restaurant in Seattle, in the U.S. state of Washington. The business earned chef Jerry Traunfeld James Beard Foundation Award nomination in the Outstanding Chef category.

== Description ==
According to Fodor's, Poppy served "mainly seasonal new American cuisine with occasional Asian accents" from a "bright, airy" space on Broadway on Capitol Hill, Seattle. Eater Seattle said the restaurant served "Northwest ingredients weaved into Indian cuisine, including Tandoori chicken with cilantro slaw and paneer with maitake mushrooms, all bolstered by marvelous soups, spices, vegetables, and naan". Lonely Planet considered the menu fusion cuisine.

Poppy's signature was the daily thali, or "a tray of 10 complimentary dishes intended as a main course for one". Included are mashed chickpeas with parsley and preserved lemon, eggplant soup with coconut yogurt, poached oysters, and Doubanjiang braised pork shoulder.

== History ==
Jason Jones was a sous chef at Poppy.

Chef Jerry Traunfeld closed the restaurant in 2021 and relocated to Palm Springs, California. Rebecca and Nathan Lockwood, who own nearby Italian restaurant Altura, purchased the space to open the restaurant Carrello.

== Reception ==
In 2016, the restaurant earned Traunfeld a James Beard Foundation Award nomination in the Outstanding Chef category.

== See also ==
- List of defunct restaurants of the United States
- List of Indian restaurants
- List of New American restaurants
