= Joey Altman =

American chef, restaurateur, television host and writer

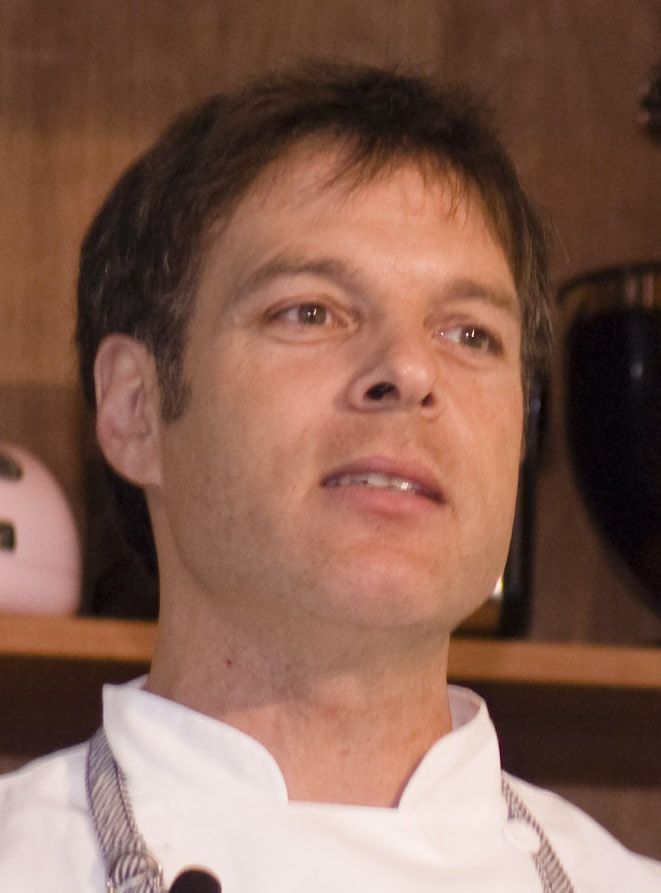
- Joey Altman in 2008
- Born: New York, U.S.
- Education: Sullivan County Community College
- Culinary career
- Current restaurants: China Live; Hazie's
- Previous restaurants: Miss Pearl's Jam House; The Palace; Wild Hare
- Television shows: Bay Cafe; What's Cooking with Joey Altman; Appetite for Adventure; Tasting Napa
- Award won: James Beard Award - 2000, 2001, 2006
- Website: www.joeyaltman.com

Joey Altman is an American chef, restaurateur, television host and writer.

== Early life and education ==
Altman grew up in the Catskills in New York, where his father was an attorney and judge and his mother sold cosmetics at Grossinger's Catskill Resort Hotel. As a child he wanted to be a magician, a stunt man, musician or an actor. He earned a degree in hotel and restaurant management at the Sullivan County Community College in New York.

== Career ==
He trained under Bernard Constantin at the Hotel Larivoire in Lyon, France, and with Jean Brouilly at Tarare in Brittany, France. He worked under chef Bob Kinkaide at the Harvest Restaurant in Cambridge, Massachusetts. In 1985 he moved to New Orleans, Louisiana to work for Emeril Lagasse at Commander's Palace.

In San Francisco he worked for Jeremiah Tower at Stars, Taxi, and as a private chef at music promoter Bill Graham's concert venues. In 1989 he opened Miss Pearl's Jam House, a restaurant at the Phoenix Hotel in San Francisco's Tenderloin District. He owned and ran the Wild Hare Restaurant in Menlo Park, California from 1999 to 2003. From 2002-2017, Altman was spokesman for Diageo Chateau & Estate Wines. Altman has had an extensive culinary consulting career working on a wide variety of projects from Tommy Bahama to opening an award winning restaurant in Mumbai India with his cousin, chef Alex Sanchez. In 2017 Altman worked as Director of Culinary Operations with George Chen to open San Francisco's most ambitious Chinese restaurant, China Live.

=== Television career ===
At Food Network, Altman hosted "Appetite for Adventure", which demonstrated outdoor travel cooking, and "Tasting Napa", a travelogue. He was the host of "What's Cooking with Joey Altman" on Shop at Home Network. In 1998 he launched the long-running "Bay Cafe", which features on-location and in-studio cooking demonstrations with guest chefs from around the San Francisco Bay Area.

=== Teaching ===
Altman has taught cooking classes around the country and regularly a guest chef instructor at Rancho La Puerta, a premier spa resort in Tecate, Mexico.

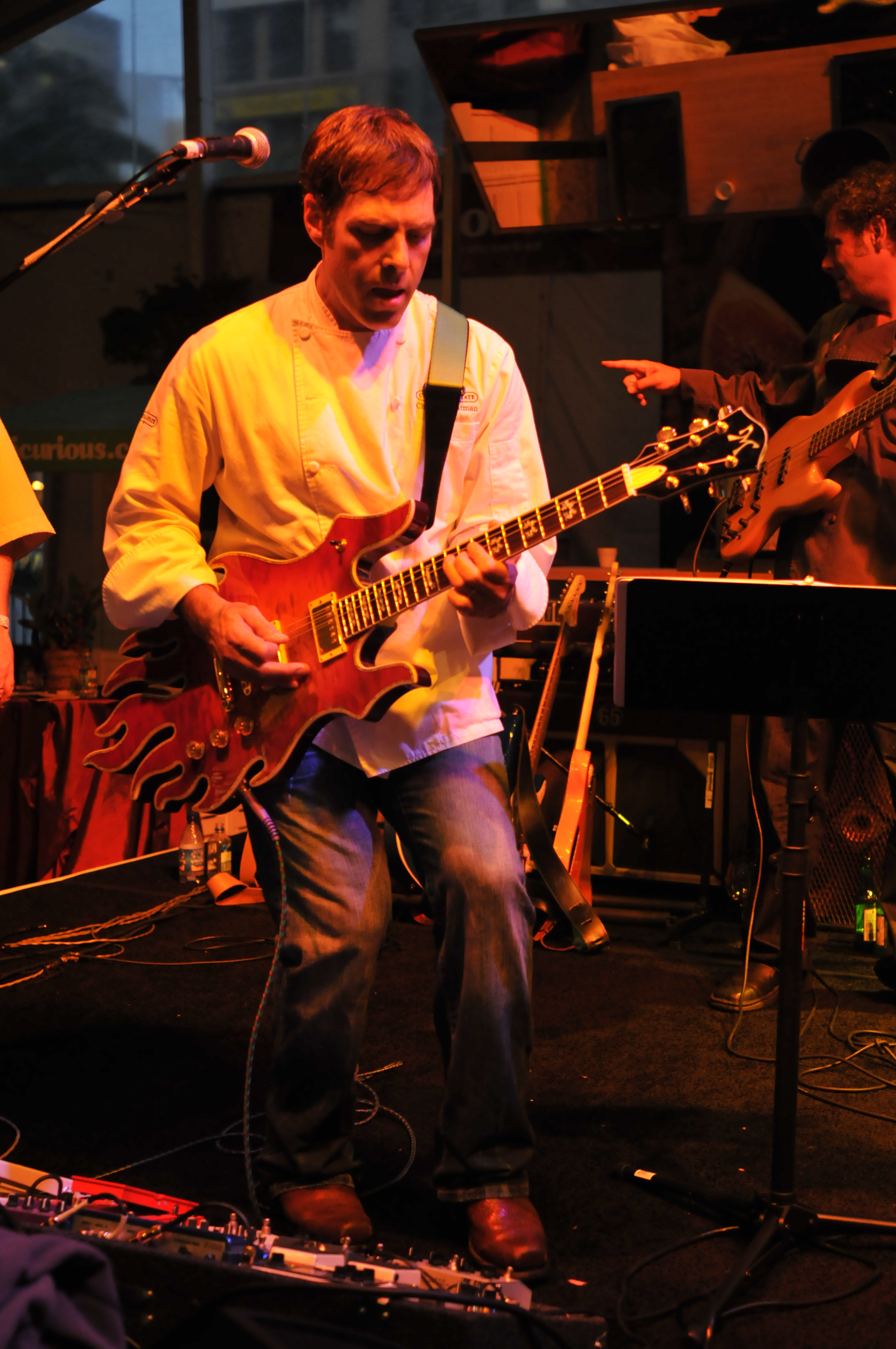
Altman, playing guitar at a fundraiser in San Francisco, is a hobbyist musician.

=== Awards ===
- James Beard Foundation Award broadcast media awards for "Best Local Television Cooking Series" in: 2000, 2001, 2006.

== Personal life ==
Altman is married to Jaemie Altman, a restaurant financial consultant and CEO of Alice Water's Lulu Restaurant at the Hammer Museum in Los Angeles. Together they have 3 children; Johanna and Caleb Malaer and Piper Altman. Joey Altman is also a blues guitarist, and founding member of the all-chef band "Back Burner Blues" which played for many charity events from 2001-2018.

== Bibliography ==
- with Jennie Schacht. Without Reservations: How to Make Bold, Creative, Flavorful Food at Home. Hoboken: Wiley (2008). ISBN 0470130458
