= Stars (restaurant) =

San Francisco restaurant

Restaurant information
- Established: 1984
- Closed: 1999
- Previous owner: Jeremiah Tower
- Food type: California cuisine
- Location: 150 Redwood Alley, San Francisco, California, United States

Stars was a landmark restaurant in San Francisco, California, from 1984 through 1999. Along with Spago, Michael's and Chez Panisse, it is considered one of the birthplaces of California cuisine, New American cuisine and the institution of the celebrity chef.

== History ==
Jeremiah Tower, former chef of Chez Panisse, opened Stars at 150 Redwood Alley near San Francisco's City Hall in 1984, together with investors from Berkeley's Fourth Street Grill and Santa Fe Bar and Grill. With an opulent interior, a busy open kitchen and an unabashed preference for socialites and celebrities, Stars and its pioneering approach to food and dining became an instant sensation.

The restaurant was among the top-grossing eateries in the United States for years. Tower opened branches of Stars in Oakville (Napa Valley), Palo Alto, Manila and Singapore. He opened The Peak Cafe in Hong Kong in the 1990s, as well as various related ventures in San Francisco including a more casual cafe and an upscale bistro Stars Cafe, next door, another restaurant nearby known as Speedo 690 located at 690 Van Ness Avenue described by Tower as "romantic Polynesian cuisine" and a kitchenware shop. His side ventures invariably failed and by the late 1990s even Stars began losing money rapidly due to its inability to attract sufficient numbers of affluent diners who could support the restaurant's high overhead. Stars closed in late 1999, after which a "bittersweet" Tower declared that he was done with California.

After Tower's departure the restaurant was reopened briefly by new investors under the same name but with a less expensive, Mediterranean concept. In 2004 it became the new location of San Francisco's Trader Vic's, which had been closed since 1994. The Palo Alto location of Stars became a branch of Wolfgang Puck's Spago Restaurant in 1997.

== Notable chefs ==
Several independently noteworthy chefs worked at Stars. Stars alumni include:

- Joey Altman (Bay Cafe television program, Wild Hare restaurant)
- Mario Batali (Entertainment personality and chef, Food Network star)
- Steve Ells (founder and Executive Chairman of Chipotle Mexican Grill)
- Emily Luchetti (pastry chef, Farallon)

== See also ==
- List of New American restaurants
