= List of programs distributed by American Public Television =

The following is a list of programs currently distributed to public television stations (including PBS affiliates) through American Public Television. It also lists upcoming programming. There is a separate list for former programming.

== Current programming ==
Legend
^{APT WORLDWIDE}	Also on APT Worldwide
^{CREATE}	Also on Create
^{HDTV}	High-definition television
^{ITVS}	Funded and distributed by Independent Television Service
^{LPB}	Funded and distributed by Latino Public Broadcasting
^{NHK}	Funded and distributed by NHK (Japan Broadcasting Corporation)
^{VMM}	Funded and distributed by Vision Maker Media (formerly Native American Public Broadcasting Consortium and Native American Public Telecommunications)
^{WORLD}	Also on WORLD

=== Reality programs ===
==== How-to ====
===== 1990s =====
Title	Premiere date	How to	Note(s)	Legend(s)	Source(s)
The Best of The Joy of Painting	September 3, 1991	Painting		^{CREATE}	

===== 2000s =====
Title	Premiere date	How to	Note(s)	Legend(s)	Source(s)
America's Test Kitchen	January 6, 2001	Cooking		^{CREATE}	
P. Allen Smith's Garden Home	April 1, 2003	Gardening		^{CREATE}	
Taste of Louisiana with Chef John Folse & Company	April 5, 2003	Cooking	(Note: Distributed by PBS in seasons 1-9.) (Note: aka Taste of Louisiana with Chef John Folse & Co.: Louisiana Cooking with a Change of Heart in season 10.) (Note: aka Taste of Louisiana with Chef John Folse & Co.: Our Food Heritage in season 11.) (Note: aka Taste of Louisiana with Chef John Folse & Co.: After the Hunt in season 12.) (Note: aka Taste of Louisiana with Chef John Folse & Company: Hooks Lies & Alibis in season 13.)	^{CREATE}	
Simply Ming	October 4, 2003	Cooking		^{CREATE}	
Sara's Weeknight Meals	April 5, 2008	Cooking		^{CREATE}	
Cook's Country	September 6, 2008	Cooking	(Note: aka Cook's Country from America's Test Kitchen in seasons 1-6.)	^{CREATE}	
The Great American Seafood Cook-Off	April 4, 2009	Cooking		^{CREATE}	

===== 2010s =====
Title	Premiere date	How to	Note(s)	Legend(s)	Source(s)
New Scandinavian Cooking	April 17, 2010	Cooking		^{APT WORLDWIDE}^{CREATE}	
Growing a Greener World	May 15, 2010	Gardening	(Note: Lifestyle genre in seasons 4-8.)	^{APT WORLDWIDE}^{CREATE}	
Pati's Mexican Table	April 2, 2011	Cooking		^{CREATE}	
The French Chef Classics	August 1, 2012	Cooking	(Note: Three-part series.) (Note: This program includes French Onion Soup, Quiche Lorraine, and French Tarts, Apple Style.)	^{CREATE}	
Lidia's Kitchen	October 5, 2013	Cooking		^{CREATE}	
Lucky Chow	May 16, 2015	Cooking		^{APT WORLDWIDE}^{CREATE}	
Steven Raichlen's Project Smoke	June 27, 2015	Cooking		^{CREATE}	
Dining with the Chef	September 1, 2015	Cooking		^{CREATE}	
Jacques Pépin: Heart & Soul	September 19, 2015	Cooking		^{CREATE}	
New Orleans Cooking with Kevin Belton	April 16, 2016	Cooking		^{CREATE}	
Ellie's Real Good Food	May 19, 2016	Cooking		^{APT WORLDWIDE}^{CREATE}	
Baby Makes 3	June 1, 2016	Home improvement		^{CREATE}	
Julie Taboulie's Lebanese Kitchen	April 11, 2017	Cooking		^{CREATE}	
Christopher Kimball's Milk Street Television	September 8, 2017	Cooking		^{CREATE}	
My Greek Table With Diane Kochilas	October 4, 2017	Cooking		^{APT WORLDWIDE}^{CREATE}	
Fit 2 Stitch	October 7, 2017	Home improvement	(Note: Distributed by NETA (aka National Educational Telecommunications Association) in seasons 1-4.)	^{CREATE}	
Joanne Weir's Plates and Places	February 5, 2018	Cooking		^{CREATE}	
Kevin Belton's New Orleans Kitchen	April 7, 2018	Cooking		^{CREATE}	
Yan Can Cook: Spice Kingdom	May 1, 2018	Cooking		^{CREATE}	
Steven Raichlen's Project Fire	May 25, 2018	Cooking		^{CREATE}	
TasteMAKERS	October 6, 2018	Cooking		^{APT WORLDWIDE}^{CREATE}	
Confucius Was a Foodie	January 1, 2019	Cooking		^{CREATE}	
Trails to Oishii Tokyo	April 4, 2019	Cooking		^{CREATE}^{NHK}	
Kevin Belton's New Orleans Celebrations	April 9, 2019	Cooking		^{CREATE}	
Flavor of Poland	October 27, 2019	Cooking		^{CREATE}	

===== 2020s =====
Title	Premiere date	How to	Note(s)	Legend(s)	Source(s)
Christina Cooks: Back to the Cutting Board	January 4, 2020	Cooking		^{APT WORLDWIDE}^{CREATE}	
Kitchen Queens: New Orleans	July 7, 2020	Cooking		^{CREATE}	
Les Stroud's Wild Harvest	October 1, 2020	Cooking		^{CREATE}	
Moveable Feast	November 28, 2020	Cooking	(Note: aka Moveable Feast with Relish in season 1 & 2.)	^{CREATE}	
The School of Greatness with Lewis Howes	May 4, 2021	Self help			
Kevin Belton's Cookin' Louisiana	July 1, 2021	Cooking		^{CREATE}	
The Life of Loi: Mediterranean Secrets	December 31, 2022	Cooking		^{CREATE}	
The Dooky Chase Kitchen: Leah's Legacy	April 28, 2023	Cooking		^{CREATE}	
Steven Raichlen's Planet Barbecue	May 26, 2023	Cooking		^{CREATE}	
The Key Ingredient with Sheri Castle	September 11, 2023	Cooking		^{CREATE}	
Homemade Live!	December 16, 2023	Cooking		^{CREATE}	
Table for All with Buki Elegbede	March 1, 2024	Cooking		^{CREATE}	
The Joy of Painting with Nicholas Hankins	April 1, 2024	Painting	(Note: aka The Joy of Painting with Nicholas Hankins: Bob Ross' Unfinished Season in season 1.)	^{CREATE}	
Milk Street's My Family Recipe	October 1, 2024	Cooking		^{CREATE}	
Volunteer Woodworker	November 1, 2024	Home improvement		^{CREATE}	
Louisiana Coastal Cooking	March 1, 2025	Cooking		^{CREATE}	
Kitchen Curious with Vivian Howard	October 6, 2025	Cooking		^{CREATE}	
Relish	November 1, 2025	Cooking	(Note: Distributed by PBS in seasons 1-4.)	^{CREATE}	
Indian as Apple Pie	May 1, 2026	Cooking		^{CREATE}	
Food. Curated.	July 1, 2026	Cooking		^{CREATE}	
Dook Chase: A Chef's Journey	July 18, 2026	Cooking	(Note: Originally scheduled to premiere Spring 2026.)	^{CREATE}	
P. Allen Smith's A Sense of Place	October 5, 2026	Gardening		^{CREATE}	

==== Travel ====
===== 2000s =====
Title	Premiere date	Note(s)	Legend(s)	Source(s)
Rick Steves' Europe	September 3, 2000		^{APT WORLDWIDE}^{CREATE}	
Smart Travels: Europe with Rudy Maxa	March 31, 2001	(Note: aka Smart Travels: Pacific Rim with Rudy Maxa in season 5.)	^{APT WORLDWIDE}^{CREATE}^{HDTV}	
Wild Nevada	April 5, 2003		^{CREATE}	
Joseph Rosendo's Travelscope	April 1, 2007	(Note: Originally titled Travelscope with Joseph Rosendo.) (Note: aka Travelscope in seasons 1-5.)	^{CREATE}	
Rudy Maxa's World	May 3, 2008		^{CREATE}	

===== 2010s =====
Title	Premiere date	Note(s)	Legend(s)	Source(s)
In the Americas With David Yetman	April 7, 2012		^{CREATE}	
Family Travel with Colleen Kelly	October 3, 2013		^{APT WORLDWIDE}^{CREATE}	
Islands Without Cars	September 4, 2014		^{CREATE}	
Curious Traveler	April 3, 2015		^{APT WORLDWIDE}^{CREATE}	
Dream of Italy	May 16, 2015		^{APT WORLDWIDE}^{CREATE}	
Journeys in Japan	September 1, 2015	(Note: Originally lifestyle genre.)	^{CREATE}^{NHK}	
Bare Feet with Mickela Mallozzi	April 2, 2016	(Note: aka Bare Feet in NYC with Mickela Mallozzi in season 2.)	^{CREATE}	
Weekends with Yankee	April 22, 2017		^{CREATE}	
Samantha Brown's Places to Love	January 2, 2018		^{CREATE}	
Cycle Around Japan Highlights	January 4, 2019		^{CREATE}^{NHK}	
Outside: Beyond the Lens	October 1, 2019		^{APT WORLDWIDE}^{CREATE}	
100 Days, Drinks, Dishes & Destinations	October 29, 2019		^{CREATE}	

===== 2020s =====
Title	Premiere date	Note(s)	Legend(s)	Source(s)
Canvasing the World with Sean Diediker	January 20, 2020		^{CREATE}	
Passion Italy	May 5, 2020		^{CREATE}	
Secrets of the Royal Palaces	January 2, 2021	(Note: Documentary genre in seasons 1-4.)		
World's Greatest Cemeteries	May 6, 2021		^{CREATE}	
Real Road Adventures	April 24, 2022		^{APT WORLDWIDE}^{CREATE}	
Martin Clunes: Islands of the Pacific	November 1, 2022			
Wild Rivers with Tillie	February 1, 2023			
People of the North	April 1, 2023		^{APT WORLDWIDE}^{CREATE}	
Joseph Rosendo's Steppin' Out	March 8, 2024		^{CREATE}	
View Finders	May 1, 2024		^{CREATE}	
World's Most Scenic River Journeys	November 1, 2024			
Michael Palin in North Korea	November 1, 2024	(Note: Two-part series.)		
Dream of Europe	January 18, 2025		^{APT WORLDWIDE}^{CREATE}	
Alan Cumming's Most Luxurious Train Journeys Scotland	May 1, 2025			
Dive in Tokyo	July 1, 2025		^{NHK}	
Big Adventures: Into the Amazon with Robson Green	July 1, 2025			
Leguizamo Does America	September 1, 2025	(Note: Art & culture genre in season 1.)		
Wild Foods	April 1, 2026			
Martin Clunes: Islands of America	May 1, 2026			
Japanology Plus	July 1, 2026		^{NHK}	
The Orient Express: A Golden Era of Travel	August 1, 2026	(Note: Four-part series.)		
Inside the Langham	August 1, 2026			
America's Great Trails	November 1, 2026			

==== Health ====
===== 1990s =====
Title	Premiere date	Note(s)	Legend(s)	Source(s)
Wai Lana Yoga	May 1, 1999			
Classical Stretch: By Essentrics	October 2, 1999	(Note: aka Classical Stretch in seasons 1-3 and Classical Stretch: The Esmonde Technique in seasons 4-10.)	^{CREATE}	

===== 2000s =====
Title	Premiere date	Note(s)	Legend(s)	Source(s)
Second Opinion with Joan Lunden	October 2, 2009	(Note: Distributed by PBS in seasons 1-5.) (Note: aka Second Opinion in seasons 1-16.)	^{WORLD}	

===== 2010s =====
Title	Premiere date	Note(s)	Legend(s)	Source(s)
Yoga in Practice	November 4, 2017		^{APT WORLDWIDE}^{CREATE}	

===== 2020s =====
Title	Premiere date	Note(s)	Legend(s)	Source(s)
GardenFit	March 21, 2022		^{CREATE}	
Medical Frontiers	September 1, 2022		^{NHK}	
Your Fountain of Youth with Lee Holden	November 1, 2022			

==== Lifestyle ====
===== 2000s =====
Title	Premiere date	Note(s)	Legend(s)	Source(s)
For Your Home	January 3, 2004	(Note: Distributed by NETA (aka National Educational Telecommunications Association) in seasons 1-13) (Note: Originally how to/home improvement genre.)	^{CREATE}	
America's Heartland	September 24, 2005	(Note: Travel genre in seasons 1-3.)	^{APT WORLDWIDE}^{WORLD}	

===== 2010s =====
Title	Premiere date	Note(s)	Legend(s)	Source(s)
George Hirsch Lifestyle	April 5, 2014		^{CREATE}	
A Craftsman's Legacy	September 4, 2014	(Note: Documentary genre in season 1.)	^{APT WORLDWIDE}^{CREATE}	
Urban Conversion	April 1, 2015		^{APT WORLDWIDE}^{CREATE}	
Make48	September 2, 2017		^{CREATE}	
You Are Cordially Invited	February 6, 2018		^{CREATE}	
To Dine For with Kate Sullivan	October 24, 2018		^{CREATE}	
J Schwanke's Life in Bloom	April 1, 2019		^{APT WORLDWIDE}^{CREATE}	

===== 2020s =====
Title	Premiere date	Note(s)	Legend(s)	Source(s)
Legacy List with Matt Paxton	January 1, 2020	(Note: Originally titled The Legacy List.)	^{CREATE}	
Modern Pioneering With Georgia Pellegrini	October 5, 2020		^{APT WORLDWIDE}^{CREATE}	
Wine First	October 5, 2021		^{APT WORLDWIDE}^{CREATE}	
Welcome to My Farm	April 1, 2022		^{APT WORLDWIDE}^{CREATE}	
My World Too	October 1, 2023		^{CREATE}	
America the Bountiful	April 1, 2024		^{APT WORLDWIDE}^{CREATE}	
Fresh Glass	February 1, 2025	(Note: Distributed by PBS from 2022 to 2025.)	^{CREATE}	
Fork & Hammer	October 13, 2025		^{CREATE}	
Follow the Blooms	June 1, 2026		^{CREATE}	
Living Longer with Loi	November 15, 2026		^{CREATE}	

=== Reality specials ===
==== How-to ====
===== 2010s =====
Title	Premiere date	How to	Note(s)	Legend(s)	Source(s)
Chef Paul Prudhomme: Louisiana Legend	April 1, 2017	Cooking		^{CREATE}	
America's Home Cooking: Stuffed	March 3, 2019	Cooking			

===== 2020s =====
Title	Premiere date	How to	Note(s)	Legend(s)	Source(s)
America's Home Cooking: Easy Recipes for Thrifty Cooking	November 23, 2023	Cooking	(Note: The 1st release ended on December 31, 2025.) (Note: The 2nd release premieres on August 1, 2026.)		
Social Security & You with Mary Beth Franklin	February 22, 2024	Self help			
America's Test Kitchen Celebrates 25 Years	September 20, 2024	Cooking		^{CREATE}	
America's Home Cooking: Around the World in 80 Recipes	August 7, 2025	Cooking			
America's Home Cooking: Flavors of the Fourth	February 26, 2026	Cooking			

==== Travel ====
===== 2000s =====
Title	Premiere date	Note(s)	Legend(s)	Source(s)
Richard Bangs Adventures with Purpose Egypt: Quest for the Lord of the Nile	September 1, 2007		^{CREATE}	
Richard Bangs Adventures with Purpose New Zealand: Quest for Kaitiakitanga	February 1, 2008		^{CREATE}	
Richard Bangs Adventures with Purpose Switzerland: Quest for the Sublime	July 1, 2008		^{CREATE}	
Rick Steves' Iran	January 11, 2009	(Note: Originally titled Iran, Yesterday and Today.)	^{CREATE}	
Richard Bangs Adventures with Purpose Morocco: Quest for the Kasbah	February 1, 2009		^{CREATE}	
Richard Bangs Adventures with Purpose Norway: Quest for the Viking Spirit	April 1, 2009		^{CREATE}	
Richard Bangs Adventures with Purpose Assam India: Quest for the One-Horned Rhinoceros	July 1, 2009		^{CREATE}	

===== 2010s =====
Title	Premiere date	Note(s)	Legend(s)	Source(s)
Richard Bangs Adventures with Purpose Greece: Quest for the Gods	April 4, 2010		^{CREATE}	
Richard Bangs Adventures with Purpose Hong Kong: Quest for the Dragon	July 4, 2010		^{CREATE}	
Chesapeake Bay By Air	February 18, 2011		^{CREATE}	
Richard Bangs Adventures with Purpose Costa Rica: Quest for Pura Vida	September 4, 2011		^{CREATE}	
Richard Bangs Adventures with Purpose Pearl River Delta: Hong Kong, Macau and Guangdong: Quest for Harmony	February 7, 2012		^{CREATE}	
Richard Bangs Adventures with Purpose Geneva and the Matterhorn: Quest for the Water Castle	April 4, 2012		^{CREATE}	
Richard Bangs Adventures with Purpose Basel and Lucerne: Quest for the Crossroads	April 4, 2012		^{CREATE}	
Rick Steves' Festive Europe	March 1, 2014	(Note: Pledge event.)	^{CREATE}	
Real Rail Adventures: Switzerland	April 7, 2014		^{CREATE}	
Rick Steves Holy Land: Israelis and Palestinians Today	September 1, 2014			
Rick Steves European Easter	January 1, 2017		^{APT WORLDWIDE}	
Rick Steves' Europe: Great German Cities	February 19, 2017			
Rick Steves' Heart of Italy	March 5, 2017			
Rick Steves' Tasty Europe	August 1, 2017			
Rick Steves Luther and the Reformation	August 3, 2017	(Note: Originally titled Rick Steves' Martin Luther and The Reformation.)	^{APT WORLDWIDE}	
Rick Steves European Festivals	October 1, 2017		^{APT WORLDWIDE}^{CREATE}	
Real Rail Adventures: Swiss Winter Magic	October 2, 2017		^{CREATE}	
Rick Steves Andalucía: Southern Spain	February 23, 2018		^{APT WORLDWIDE}^{CREATE}	
Rick Steves Cruising the Mediterranean	February 1, 2019		^{APT WORLDWIDE}^{CREATE}	
Dream of Italy: Tuscan Sun Special	August 19, 2019		^{CREATE}	

===== 2020s =====
Title	Premiere date	Note(s)	Legend(s)	Source(s)
Real Rail Adventures: Swiss International Hubs	April 1, 2020		^{CREATE}	
Rick Steves Egypt: Yesterday & Today	September 23, 2020		^{APT WORLDWIDE}^{CREATE}	
Rick Steves Island Hopping Europe	February 26, 2021			
Rick Steves Best of the Alps	September 1, 2021		^{APT WORLDWIDE}^{CREATE}	
Rick Steves Why We Travel	February 26, 2022		^{CREATE}	
Rick Steves European Christmas	December 1, 2022		^{APT WORLDWIDE}^{CREATE}	
Rick Steves Mighty Alps	February 23, 2024			
Field Trip with Curtis Stone: Hong Kong	February 10, 2024		^{CREATE}	
Rick Steves Iceland	August 11, 2024		^{APT WORLDWIDE}^{CREATE}	
Britain By the Book	November 1, 2024			
Rick Steves: Experiencing Europe	January 1, 2025		^{APT WORLDWIDE}^{CREATE}	
Rick Steves Poland	April 1, 2025		^{APT WORLDWIDE}	
Visions of Italy: Southern Style	November 27, 2025			
Safe Harbors: Lighthouses of Maine	February 1, 2026			
Rick Steves Best of Paris	April 1, 2026			
Maryland by Air	May 1, 2026			
Rick Steves Best of London	July 1, 2026			
Rick Steves Best of Rome	October 1, 2026			

==== Health ====
===== 2010s =====
Title	Premiere date	Note(s)	Legend(s)	Source(s)
Aging Backwards 3 with Miranda Esmonde-White	November 16, 2019			

===== 2020s =====
Title	Premiere date	Note(s)	Legend(s)	Source(s)
Aging Backwards 4: The Miracle of Flexibility with Miranda Esmonde-White	February 20, 2023			

==== Lifestyle ====
===== 2000s =====
Title	Premiere date	Note(s)	Legend(s)	Source(s)
A Home for Christy Rost: Thanksgiving	November 1, 2009		^{CREATE}	

=== Documentary programs ===
==== Documentary ====
===== 2000s =====
Title	Premiere date	Note(s)	Legend(s)	Source(s)
Roadtrip Nation	June 26, 2004	(Note: Travel genre in seasons 1-13.)		

===== 2010s =====
Title	Premiere date	Note(s)	Legend(s)	Source(s)
Pacific Heartbeat	May 1, 2012		^{WORLD}	
Ancient Roads from Christ to Constantine	April 1, 2015	(Note: The 1st release ended on March 31, 2018.) (Note: The 2nd release premiered on February 29, 2024.)		
Secrets of Great British Castles	October 1, 2015	(Note: The 1st release ended on February 28, 2019.) (Note: The 2nd release premiered on July 1, 2026.)		
Chaplains	November 1, 2015			
Films BYkids	January 19, 2016			
Portrayal & Perception: African American Men & Boys	February 1, 2016			
Global Spirit	April 1, 2017	(Note: Distributed by NETA (aka National Educational Telecommunications Association) in season 1 from 2012 to 2013.)		
Skindigenous	February 13, 2018		^{VMM}	
Gandhi's Awakening & Gandhi's Gift	August 30, 2018	(Note: This package includes Gandhi's Awakening and Gandhi's Gift.)	^{APT WORLDWIDE}	
Growing Native	November 6, 2018		^{VMM}	
The Future of America's Past	September 3, 2019			

===== 2020s =====
Title	Premiere date	Note(s)	Legend(s)	Source(s)
The Good Road	April 6, 2020			
Creating Common Wealth	May 1, 2021			
Our Time	February 1, 2022			
Route 66 Women: The Untold Story of the Mother Road	March 1, 2022	(Note: The 1st release ended on February 29, 2024.) (Note: The 2nd release premiered on July 1, 2024.)		
Chasing Silver: The Story of Gorham	May 19, 2022			
Searching: Our Quest for Meaning in the Age of Science	January 7, 2023		^{APT WORLDWIDE}	
Sabbath	June 1, 2023			
On the Road with Chatham Rabbits	August 7, 2023			
Life in the Heart Land	September 1, 2023		^{WORLD}	
Returning Citizens: Life Beyond Incarceration	March 1, 2024			
Roadtrip Nation: Ideas for All	April 29, 2024			
Through Our Eyes	May 1, 2024			
Roadtrip Nation: Education's Future	May 1, 2024			
Confluence	July 12, 2024		^{APT WORLDWIDE}	
Roadtrip Nation: Built on Skills	August 19, 2024			
Religion, Racism, & Reconciliation	February 1, 2025			
Journeys of Black Mathematicians	February 1, 2025			
Hitler: A Life in Pictures	April 15, 2025			
Mysteries of the Pyramids with Dara Ó Briain	May 1, 2025			
The Real Wild West	May 1, 2025			
The Last Independent Automaker	May 1, 2025			
Cinema Nomad	May 1, 2025			
Roadtrip Nation: Rethinking Higher Ed	May 1, 2025			
Grown Up Dad	June 1, 2025			
Headwaters Down	June 21, 2025			
Roadtrip Nation: Tech for Us	August 1, 2025			
Roadtrip Nation: Thriving - Black Men in Higher Education	September 1, 2025			
Roadtrip Nation: Nursing Possibilities	November 1, 2025			
Inside the Tower of London	January 1, 2026	(Note: Distributed by PBS in seasons 1-4.)		
The Rise and Fall of the Rust Belt	January 1, 2026			
Los Angeles: Stories from the City	January 1, 2026			
Suddenly Royal	January 1, 2026			
The Empire Builder: James J. Hill and the Great Northern Railway	January 1, 2026			
From That Small Island: The Story of the Irish	January 4, 2026			
Everlasting: Life and Legacy of Medgar Evers	February 1, 2026			
Roadtrip Nation: Many Roads Forward	March 2, 2026			
She Was First	March 20, 2026			
Roadtrip Nation: The Inside Scholars	April 1, 2026			
Shakespeare: Rise of a Genius	April 1, 2026			
Kate: The Making of a Princess	April 1, 2026			
Titanic: Secrets of the Shipwreck	May 1, 2026			
Nick Knowles: Heritage Rescue	May 1, 2026			
Roadtrip Nation: Where Wellbeing Grows	May 1, 2026			
Roadtrip Nation: Explore Your Interests	June 1, 2026			
Les Stroud's Survivorman	June 1, 2026			
Generations: California @250	June 1, 2026			
The War that Made America	July 1, 2026	(Note: Distributed by PBS from 2006 to 2008.)	^{APT WORLDWIDE}	
Sacred Ground with Tim Daly	July 1, 2026			
Roadtrip Nation: Beyond Books	September 1, 2026			
Bucks County, USA	September 20, 2026			
Roadtrip Nation: Wealth of Opportunity	October 1, 2026	(Note: Originally titled Roadtrip Nation: Investment Roadtrip.)		
Life in the Heartland: An America 250 Special	October 1, 2026			
The Fisher People	October 1, 2026	(Note: Originally titled Mississippi, USA: The Fisher People.)		
Homegrown History	October 1, 2026			
Christianity at a Crossroads	October 1, 2026			
The History of Home	October 1, 2026			
How We Grieve	October 5, 2026			
The Pursuit of Happiness	November 1, 2026			

==== Nature & science ====
===== 2000s =====
Title	Premiere date	Note(s)	Legend(s)	Source(s)
The Desert Speaks	September 7, 2003	(Note: Distributed by PBS in seasons 1-7 and 12.) (Note: Distributed by NETA (aka National Educational Telecommunications Association) in seasons 8-11.) (Note: Originally travel genre.)	^{APT WORLDWIDE}^{HDTV}^{WORLD}	
Changing Seas	November 7, 2009		^{APT WORLDWIDE}	

===== 2010s =====
Title	Premiere date	Note(s)	Legend(s)	Source(s)
Expeditions with Patrick McMillan	April 6, 2013		^{APT WORLDWIDE}	
Short Expeditions with Patrick McMillan	April 1, 2018			

===== 2020s =====
Title	Premiere date	Note(s)	Legend(s)	Source(s)
Untamed	April 14, 2020			
Doug's Geology Journal	January 8, 2023		^{APT WORLDWIDE}	
Wild Hope	June 1, 2023		^{WORLD}	
Portrait of a Landscape: Seasons	June 10, 2024			
Einstein and Hawking: Masters of Our Universe	March 31, 2025			
Ambient Film	April 20, 2025			
Kerry: Tides of Time	August 1, 2025		^{WORLD}	
Great Natural Monuments: Grand Canyon	September 1, 2025			
Scotland: Escape to the Wilderness	December 1, 2025			

==== Art & culture ====
===== 2020s =====
Title	Premiere date	Note(s)	Legend(s)	Source(s)
By the River	April 1, 2022			
Rick Steves Art of Europe	October 1, 2022		^{APT WORLDWIDE}^{CREATE}	
Joseph Campbell and the Power of Myth with Bill Moyers	March 1, 2025			
Have Guitar Will Travel World	May 1, 2025			
Books By the River	May 1, 2025			
First Peoples, First Stories	May 1, 2026		^{VMM}	

==== Biography ====
===== 2020s =====
Title	Premiere date	Note(s)	Legend(s)	Source(s)
The Story of...	March 1, 2022	(Note: The 2nd release of this series includes The Story of Marilyn Monroe, The Story of Elizabeth Taylor, The Story of John Travolta and The Story of Patrick Swayze.) (Note: The 1st release ended on February 29, 2024.) (Note: The 2nd release premiered on September 1, 2025.)		
Diana's Decades	July 1, 2026			

==== Aviation/military ====
===== 2010s =====
Title	Premiere date	Note(s)	Legend(s)	Source(s)
Angle of Attack	November 1, 2011		^{APT WORLDWIDE}	

===== 2020s =====
Title	Premiere date	Note(s)	Legend(s)	Source(s)
WW2 Women On the Frontline	April 1, 2025			

=== Documentary specials ===
==== Documentary^{WORLD} ====
===== 2000s =====
Title	Premiere date	Note(s)	Legend(s)	Source(s)
Black/White & Brown: Brown Versus the Board of Education of Topeka	May 1, 2004			
The Teachings of Jon	April 2, 2006			
Daredevils of Niagara Falls	November 15, 2006	(Note: The 1st release ended on November 14, 2009.) (Note: The 2nd release premieres on November 1, 2026.)		
The Golden Game: Baseball in Sacramento	June 1, 2007			
Monet's Palate: A Gastronomic View from the Gardens of Giverny	April 1, 2008	(Note: The 1st release ended on March 31, 2010.) (Note: The 2nd release premiered on September 1, 2010 and ended on August 31, 2018.) (Note: The 3rd release premiered on September 1, 2023.) (Note: Art & culture genre in the 2nd release.)		
Questioning the Constitution	October 5, 2008			
Chihuly in the Hotshop	November 1, 2008	(Note: The 1st release ended on October 31, 2017.) (Note: The 2nd release premiered on April 1, 2024.)		
In the Footsteps of Marco Polo	November 16, 2008			
Fly Boys: Western Pennsylvania's Tuskegee Airmen	February 1, 2009			
Assassination: Idaho's Trial of the Century	March 1, 2009			
Swimming in Auschwitz	April 1, 2009	(Note: The 1st release ended on March 31, 2017.) (Note: The 2nd release premiered on April 6, 2020.)	^{APT WORLDWIDE}	
Forgotten War: The Struggle for North America	December 1, 2009			

===== 2010s =====
Title	Premiere date	Note(s)	Legend(s)	Source(s)
Locked Out: The Fall of Massive Resistance	February 1, 2010			
Navy Heroes of Normandy	April 1, 2010	(Note: Aviation/military genre in the 1st release.) (Note: The 1st release ended on March 31, 2012.) (Note: The 2nd release premiered on November 1, 2012.)		
Losing Lambert: A Journey Through Survival & Hope	September 2, 2010			
Things That Go Bump in the Night	October 17, 2010			
Chihuly Fire & Light	November 7, 2010			
Dead Reckoning: Champlain in America	November 7, 2010			
The Agatha Christie Code	January 1, 2011	(Note: The 1st release ended on December 31, 2012.) (Note: The 2nd release premiered on April 1, 2026.)		
Mysteries of the Jesus Prayer	April 1, 2011			
Glacier Park's Night of the Grizzles	April 6, 2011		^{APT WORLDWIDE}	
A Harpist's Legacy: Ann Hobson Pilot and the Sound of Change	November 3, 2011	(Note: Originally biography genre.)		
Signs of the Time	March 24, 2012			
Native Waters: A Chitimacha Recollection	April 1, 2012			
Into the Wild: Edison, Ford & Friends	May 8, 2012			
Biz Kid$: Three Minutes to Change the World	May 20, 2012			
World War II: Saving the Reality	November 1, 2012			
Racing the Rez	November 1, 2012		^{VMM}	
Serving America: Memories of Peace Corps	November 1, 2012			
Chihuly Outside	November 4, 2012			
Sousa on the Rez: Marching to the Beat of a Different Drum	January 6, 2013		^{VMM}	
Frank Lloyd Wright's Boynton House: The Next Hundred Years	February 1, 2013	(Note: Originally titled The Restoration of The Boynton House in 2011.) (Note: Originally titled For the Next Hundred Years in 2012.)		
A Company of Heroes	April 2, 2013			
Maggie's War: A True Story of Courage, Leadership and Valor in World War II	April 2, 2013			
3 Miles an Hour	April 7, 2013			
Get the Math 2.0	September 1, 2013			
A Promise to My Father	September 1, 2013	(Note: The 1st release ended on August 31, 2016.) (Note: The 2nd release premiered on February 1, 2017.)		
Plainspirits	October 1, 2013			
War of 1812 in the Old Northwest	November 1, 2013			
Turning the Tide	November 3, 2013	(Note: 2013 version.)		
The Gettysburg Story	November 11, 2013			
The Education of Harvey Gantt	February 1, 2014			
Coexist	April 1, 2014			
Rebels with a Cause	April 1, 2014			
Eagles of Mercy	April 8, 2014	(Note: The 1st release ended on April 7, 2023.) (Note: The 2nd release premiered on May 15, 2025.)		
Day of Days: June 6, 1944	May 15, 2014		^{APT WORLDWIDE}	
Portraits for the Home Front: The Story of Elizabeth Black	May 20, 2014			
Bombs Away: LBJ, Goldwater and the 1964 Campaign That Changed It All	November 1, 2014			
Songs to Keep: Treasures of an Adirondack Folk Collector	November 2, 2014			
Queen of Swing	February 1, 2015			
Pulling Out All the Stops	April 3, 2015			
Cuba: The Forgotten Revolution	April 5, 2015		^{APT WORLDWIDE}	
Big Ideas for Little Kids: Teaching Philosophy Through Picture Books	May 1, 2015			
The Medicine Game	May 1, 2015		^{VMM}	
The Quietest Place on Earth	May 3, 2015			
Above and Beyond	May 3, 2015			
Music for Life: The Story of New Horizons	May 3, 2015			
Omaha Beach: Honor and Sacrifice	May 17, 2015		^{APT WORLDWIDE}	
On Home Ground: Life After Service	September 1, 2015			
Restoration Neon	September 1, 2015			
Raptors! Kings of the Sky	September 2, 2015			
The Living Dream: 100 Years of Rocky Mountain National Park	September 10, 2015			
Rising Voices/Hothaninpi	November 1, 2015		^{VMM}	
The American St. Nick	December 1, 2015			
Ghosts of Amistad: In the Footsteps of the Rebels	February 1, 2016			
Potomac by Air: Our Nation's River	February 14, 2016			
Miss Springmaid	March 1, 2016			
Georgia O'Keeffe: A Woman on Paper	March 1, 2016			
America's First Forest: Carl Schenck and the Asheville Experiment	April 1, 2016			
Real Rail Adventures: Swiss Grand Tour	April 1, 2016		^{CREATE}	
Treblinka's Last Witness	April 1, 2016		^{APT WORLDWIDE}	
Finding Elizabeth's Soldiers	May 1, 2016			
Beyond the Powder: The Legacy of the First Women's Cross-Country Air Race	June 1, 2016			
The Committee	June 1, 2016	(Note: The 1st release ended on May 31, 2019.) (Note: The 2nd release premiered on June 1, 2019.)		
Oregon Revealed, Coastal Wonder	July 1, 2016			
Black Ballerina	September 4, 2016		^{APT WORLDWIDE}	
Concussion: Answers in the Blood?	October 2, 2016			
Cuba: A Lifetime of Passion	October 9, 2016			
Feeling Good About America: The 1976 Presidential Election	October 15, 2016			
Red Power Energy	November 1, 2016		^{VMM}	
Bell Ringer: The Invisible Brain Injury	November 6, 2016			
108˚: Critical Response	November 6, 2016			
Living with Alzheimer's and Dementia	November 6, 2016			
Remember Pearl Harbor	November 15, 2016			
Paleo Sleuths	February 2, 2017		^{APT WORLDWIDE}	
Penny: Champion of the Marginalized	March 1, 2017			
I Go Home	March 1, 2017			
Soldier On: Life After Deployment	March 5, 2017			
An American Conscience: The Reinhold Niebuhr Story	April 2, 2017			
Counting from Infinity: Yitang Zhang and the Twin Prime Conjecture	April 2, 2017			
It's "Just" Anxiety	May 1, 2017			
Sweet Dillard	May 1, 2017	(Note: The 1st release ended on April 30, 2019.) (Note: The 2nd release premiered on March 3, 2020.)		
The Last Ring Home	May 2, 2017			
Earthcaster	May 3, 2017			
D-Day: Over Normandy	May 18, 2017		^{APT WORLDWIDE}	
Elder Abuse and Exploitation	June 4, 2017			
Alzheimer's: The Caregiver's Perspective	June 4, 2017			
Roadtrip Nation: Life Hackers	June 15, 2017			
Deeply Rooted: John Coykendall's Journey to Save Our Seeds and Stories	October 1, 2017			
Comedy Bootcamp: The Documentary	October 3, 2017			
America's Secret War	October 4, 2017		^{APT WORLDWIDE}	
Saving the Great Swamp: Battle to Defeat the Jetport	November 1, 2017			
This is the House That Jack Built	November 1, 2017			
Rudy and Neal Go Fishing	November 2, 2017			
Roadtrip Nation: Changing Gears	November 5, 2017			
Remembering Leonard Nimoy	November 5, 2017		^{APT WORLDWIDE}	
We Knew What We Had: The Greatest Jazz Story Never Told	February 1, 2018			
Attakapas: The Cajun Story	February 4, 2018			
Roadtrip Nation: Degree of Impact	February 4, 2018			
4 Wheel Bob	April 1, 2018		^{APT WORLDWIDE}	
The Himalaya Connection	April 1, 2018		^{APT WORLDWIDE}	
Aging Matters: Aging & the Workplace	April 1, 2018			
Defining Hope	April 1, 2018			
Orchard House: Home of Little Women	May 1, 2018			
Survivors of Malmedy: December 1944	May 6, 2018		^{APT WORLDWIDE}	
Polytrauma Rehab in the VA: Compassionate Care	May 6, 2018			
Before Stage Four: Confronting Early Psychosis	May 6, 2018			
The Toolbox of America	May 18, 2018			
Fannie Lou Hamer: Stand Up	August 2, 2018			
Rick Steves Fascism in Europe	September 1, 2018		^{APT WORLDWIDE}	
Insecta: Science That Stings	September 3, 2018			
Power Over Parkinson's	September 3, 2018			
Talent Has Hunger	September 6, 2018			
The Wild Ponies of Chincoteague	October 30, 2018		^{APT WORLDWIDE}	
Lifeline: Pearl Harbor's Unknown Hero	November 1, 2018		^{APT WORLDWIDE}	
Backs Against the Wall: The Howard Thurman Story	February 1, 2019			
Dialogue in Metal	February 28, 2019			
Return: Native American Women Reclaim Foodways for Health & Spirit	March 19, 2019	(Note: Originally titled Return 2019 version.)	^{VMM}	
Wendell Castle: A Portrait	March 27, 2019			
Roadtrip Nation: Skill Powered	March 29, 2019			
Aging Matters: Loneliness & Isolation	April 1, 2019			
Voyage of Adventure: Retracing Donelson's Journey	April 1, 2019	(Note: The 1st release ended on March 31, 2023.) (Note: The 2nd release premiered on June 1, 2026.)		
Eva: A-7063	April 2, 2019		^{APT WORLDWIDE}	
Power Over Parkinson's 2	April 4, 2019			
Justice in Chester	May 1, 2019			
Revolutionizing Dementia Care	May 2, 2019			
Great Museums: The Art of Islam at the Met and the Louvre	May 4, 2019			
The Lively One: Dick Brannan's Rise to Drag Racing Fame	May 13, 2019			
A New Leash on Life: The K9s for Warriors Story	June 4, 2019			
Space Chase USA	July 1, 2019			
Design in Mind: On Location with James Ivory	August 5, 2019			
The Great Ride	August 12, 2019			
Roadtrip Nation: Rerouting	August 15, 2019			
Her Voice Carries	September 2, 2019			
North Korea: Inside the Hermit Kingdom	September 9, 2019			

===== 2020s =====
Title	Premiere date	Note(s)	Legend(s)	Source(s)
Rick Steves Hunger and Hope: Lessons from Ethiopia and Guatemala	February 1, 2020		^{APT WORLDWIDE}	
Guru Nanak: The Founder of Sikhism - Life and Legacy	February 6, 2020			
Beyond Barbados: The Carolina Connection	February 11, 2020			
Summoned: Frances Perkins and the General Welfare	March 3, 2020			
Revolution of the Heart: The Dorothy Day Story	March 6, 2020			
Empowered by Parkinson's	April 2, 2020			
After Auschwitz	April 6, 2020		^{APT WORLDWIDE}	
The Unforgettable Augustus Post	April 20, 2020			
Touching the Sound	May 5, 2020			
Speaking Grief	May 6, 2020			
1st to Fight: Pacific War Marines	May 15, 2020		^{APT WORLDWIDE}	
Fake: Searching for Truth in the Age of Misinformation	July 1, 2020			
And the Floods Came	July 3, 2020			
Actually, Iconic: Richard Estes	September 16, 2020			
Homecoming: Sgt. Hamilton's Long Journey	September 16, 2020			
Forgotten Fame: The Marion Miley Story	September 23, 2020			
Abandoned in the Arctic	October 1, 2020			
Love Wins Over Hate	October 7, 2020		^{APT WORLDWIDE}	
The Devil's Instrument	October 8, 2020			
Sympathetic Strings: Stories of the Hardanger Fiddle	October 8, 2020			
Eliades Ochoa: From Cuba to the World	October 11, 2020	(Note: Biography genre in the 1st release.) (Note: The 1st release ended on October 10, 2024.) (Note: The 2nd release premiered on June 1, 2026.)		
Making It in America	October 13, 2020			
First Avenue: Closer to the Stars	October 30, 2020			
The Silent Soldier and the Portrait	November 4, 2020			
Grandpa's War Story Goes Viral	November 4, 2020		^{APT WORLDWIDE}	
La Loche	November 4, 2020			
The Horse Relative	November 5, 2020			
Roadtrip Nation: A Single Mom's Story	November 6, 2020			
Opioids and First Responders: Answering the Call	January 27, 2021			
Marching Forward	February 4, 2021			
Heard	February 20, 2021			
Stories I Didn't Know	March 3, 2021			
Design in Mind: Bunny Williams - Not a House But a Home	April 1, 2021		^{CREATE}	
The West Is Burning	April 2, 2021			
Jim Crow of the North	April 14, 2021			
The Songpoet	April 24, 2021			
Chasing Voices	April 30, 2021		^{VMM}	
Unadopted	April 30, 2021			
Why This Moment	May 1, 2021			
Ernie Pyle: Life in the Trenches	May 1, 2021			
Trauma Healers	May 4, 2021		^{APT WORLDWIDE}	
Spiritual Audacity: The Abraham Joshua Heschel Story	May 5, 2021	(Note: Originally titled The Abraham Heschel Story.)		
Coming to Mni Sota	May 10, 2021			
A Will to Preach	May 25, 2021			
Surrender on the USS Missouri	May 25, 2021		^{APT WORLDWIDE}	
Out in Rural America	May 27, 2021			
Our Gorongosa	June 1, 2021			
Invisible History: Middle Florida's Hidden Roots	June 10, 2021			
This Light of Mine	August 2, 2021			
Shaw Rising	September 1, 2021			
Armed with Language	October 1, 2021			
The Bob Ross Experience	October 11, 2021		^{APT WORLDWIDE}	
Searching for Sequoyah	November 1, 2021			
Elvis and the USS Arizona	November 1, 2021		^{APT WORLDWIDE}	
Facing North: Jefferson Street, Nashville	November 1, 2021			
Memphis Belle: Her Final Mission	November 1, 2021			
The Lafayette Escadrille: The American Volunteers Who Flew for France in World War One	November 1, 2021			
Aging Matters: Companionship & Intimacy	November 1, 2021			
Almost an Island	November 2, 2021		^{VMM}	
Santa School	November 24, 2021	(Note: The 1st release ended on November 23, 2023.) (Note: The 2nd release premiered on December 1, 2024.)		
Roy Orbison Forever	November 27, 2021	(Note: The 1st release ended on December 31, 2023.) (Note: The 2nd release premiered on January 1, 2024.)		
Florence: The Art of Magnificence	January 3, 2022			
Finding Fellowship	February 1, 2022			
Go Figure: The Randy Gardener Story	February 1, 2022			
Secrets of the Surface: The Mathematical Vision of Maryam Mirzakhani	February 26, 2022			
Kea's Ark	March 1, 2022			
Aldwyth: Fully Assembled	March 1, 2022			
Return to Auschwitz: The Survival of Vladimir Munk	April 1, 2022			
A Wild Idea: The Birth of the Apa	April 2, 2022			
Shinmachi: Stronger Than a Tsunami	April 4, 2022			
Unsettled History: America, China and the Doolittle Tokyo Raid	April 15, 2022		^{APT WORLDWIDE}	
Sky Blossom: Diaries of the Next Greatest Generation	May 2, 2022			
Betrayed: Surviving an American Concentration Camp	May 2, 2022	(Note: Originally titled American Betrayal: Surviving Minidoka.)	^{APT WORLDWIDE}	
They Volunteered for This: Merrill's Marauders	May 3, 2022		^{APT WORLDWIDE}	
Lines Broken: The Story of Marion Motley	May 3, 2022			
Shrapnel Down: My Korean War Story	May 4, 2022			
Making Menuhin: A Documentary	May 5, 2022			
Nick Cave, Summit Lake: Heard	May 5, 2022			
A Season to Remember: The Baseball Boys of Mon City	May 9, 2022			
From Wall Street to Bay Street	May 17, 2022			
Hope Road	May 17, 2022			
Black College Football Hall of Fame: Journey to Canton	June 1, 2022			
Alzheimer's: What You Can Do	June 1, 2022			
Training for Freedom	June 19, 2022			
Walter Anderson: The Extraordinary Life and Art of the Islander	August 1, 2022			
Women and the Vote	August 1, 2022			
100 Years from Mississippi	August 1, 2022	(Note: The 1st release ended on July 31, 2024.) (Note: The 2nd release premiered on February 1, 2025.)		
Roadtrip Nation: Being Free	August 1, 2022			
Becoming Trauma Responsive	August 24, 2022			
Singing Our Way to Freedom	September 1, 2022			
Sages of Aging	October 1, 2022			
Show Must Go On!	October 1, 2022			
Redlining: Mapping Inequality in Dayton & Springfield	October 1, 2022			
Downwinders and the Radioactive West	October 3, 2022			
Art + Medicine: Speaking of Race	October 30, 2022			
TasteMAKERS - Winemaking in Missouri: A Well-Cultivated History	November 1, 2022			
Are We Safer Today?	November 1, 2022			
Her War, Her Story: World War II	November 1, 2022		^{APT WORLDWIDE}	
The Gerda That Remains	November 1, 2022			
Jack Taylor: The Enterprise	November 1, 2022		^{APT WORLDWIDE}	
Beyond the Stage: The Urban Nutcracker, Community & the Arts	November 25, 2022			
The Journeys of Harry Crosby	December 1, 2022			
Medici: The Art of Power	January 16, 2023			
Ida B. Wells: American Stories	February 1, 2023			
We Were Hyphy	February 1, 2023			
Kasturba Gandhi: Accidental Activist	March 1, 2023		^{APT WORLDWIDE}	
A Good Life	March 1, 2023			
Art + Medicine: Healthy Aging	March 1, 2023			
The Florida Keys: 200 Years of Paradise	March 1, 2023			
Aging Matters: Aging with Pride	March 28, 2023			
Roadtrip Nation: Changemakers	March 27, 2023			
Michigan: An American Portrait	April 1, 2023			
When We Were Shuttle	May 1, 2023			
Unconditional: Healing Hidden Wounds	May 1, 2023			
Anahita: A Mother's Journey	May 1, 2023		^{APT WORLDWIDE}	
Trolley Park: Midway Memories	May 1, 2023			
The Tuskegee Airmen: Return to Ramitelli	May 5, 2023		^{APT WORLDWIDE}	
The Seabees on Iwo Jima	May 5, 2023		^{APT WORLDWIDE}	
This is [Not] Who We Are	June 1, 2023			
For the Love of Friends	June 1, 2023			
Raised/Razed	June 15, 2023			
To the Ends of the Earth: The Natural World - Oceans	July 1, 2023		^{APT WORLDWIDE}	
We Hold These Truths: The Global Quest for Liberty	July 1, 2023		^{APT WORLDWIDE}	
The Great Ride: Landmarks Along the Trail	July 10, 2023			
Brushstroke	August 1, 2023			
Cultural Expressions: Kwanzaa	August 1, 2023			
In Search of Resolution	August 1, 2023			
The Race Epidemic	September 1, 2023			
Playing Frisbee in North Korea	September 1, 2023		^{APT WORLDWIDE}	
Code Name: Ayalon	October 1, 2023		^{APT WORLDWIDE}	
Go-Go City: Displacement and Protest in Washington, DC	October 13, 2023			
Indigenize the Plate	October 20, 2023		^{VMM}	
To Be of Service	November 1, 2023			
Into the Night: Darkness and Light	November 1, 2023			
Bob Dole, Italy and World War II	November 1, 2023			
American River	November 1, 2023			
Two Wars: The Road to Integration	November 1, 2023			
Ivan Doig: Landscapes of a Western Mind	November 1, 2023			
Inside the Warren Commission	November 1, 2023			
Aging Matters: Women Unseen	November 1, 2023			
Repairing the World: Stories from the Tree of Life	November 2, 2023			
Keeper of the Flame	November 8, 2023			
Mavericks	November 20, 2023			
Karamu: Feast for the 7th Day	December 1, 2023		^{CREATE}	
Design in Mind: Unlocking the Mysteries of Place with Gil Schafer	December 1, 2023			
Now Return Us to Normal	January 1, 2024			
The Great Chicago Fire: American Stories	January 1, 2024			
The Broken Promise	January 3, 2024			
Pullman and the Railroad Rebellion: American Stories	February 1, 2024			
Freedom House Ambulance: The First Responders	February 1, 2024			
Truth Tellers	February 1, 2024			
Wham Re-Bop-Boom-Bam: The Swing Jazz of Eddie Durham	February 1, 2024			
Bridging the Divide	February 1, 2024			
The Dream Whisperer	February 1, 2024			
The Niagara Movement: The Early Battle for Civil Rights	February 1, 2024			
Composer: Amy Beach	March 1, 2024			
Jane Addams - Together We Rise: American Stories	March 1, 2024			
Marguerite: From the Bauhaus to Pond Farm	March 1, 2024			
Facing the Laughter: Minnie Pearl	March 1, 2024			
Without Precedent: The Supreme Life of Rosalie Abella	March 15, 2024			
Chihuly: Roll the Dice	April 1, 2024			
Bridging Divides: Sharing Heartbeats	April 1, 2024		^{APT WORLDWIDE}	
Divided We Fall: Listening with Curiosity	April 10, 2024			
Trolley Park: Out West	May 1, 2024			
A House in the Garden: Shofuso and Modernism	May 1, 2024			
Hollywood Priest: The Story of Fr. "Bud" Kieser	May 1, 2024			
Newport: In This Together	May 1, 2024			
Pathways to Invention	May 1, 2024		^{APT WORLDWIDE}	
Village of Death: Oradour-Sur-Glane 1944	May 15, 2024		^{APT WORLDWIDE}	
A Final Landing on Iwo Jima	May 15, 2024		^{APT WORLDWIDE}	
Voices Over the Water	June 1, 2024			
The Outrage of Danny Sotomayor: American Stories	June 3, 2024			
The Lincoln School Story	July 1, 2024			
Never Drop the Ball	August 1, 2024			
Aging Matters: Unhoused	August 1, 2024			
Mayor Humphrey of Minneapolis	September 1, 2024			
The Five Demands	September 2, 2024			
Rise of the Freemen	September 2, 2024		^{APT WORLDWIDE}	
Amache: An American Injustice	October 1, 2024			
Swing Lo'	November 1, 2024			
And Knowledge to Keep Us	November 1, 2024		^{VMM}	
The Living Land	November 1, 2024			
Major Taylor: Champion of the Race	November 1, 2024			
The Electric Indian	November 1, 2024		^{VMM}	
Osborne House: A Royal Retreat	November 1, 2024			
The Healing	November 1, 2024			
The Boys Who Said No!	November 1, 2024			
Two Wars: No Mail, Low Morale	November 1, 2024			
Finding Her Beat	November 2, 2024			
Dad's Secret War: France 1944	November 7, 2024		^{APT WORLDWIDE}	
Peleliu: WWII's Most Well-Preserved Battlefield	November 7, 2024		^{APT WORLDWIDE}	
The Precipice	November 15, 2024			
The Virgin of Guadalupe	December 1, 2024			
Christmas at Longleat	December 1, 2024			
Jesse Ventura Shocks the World	January 1, 2025			
Unknown Destination: A Love Story	January 15, 2025			
Al Capone's Bloody Business: American Stories	February 1, 2025			
Fuzz	February 1, 2025			
Paul Laurence Dunbar: Beyond the Mask	February 1, 2025			
Hope in the Struggle: The Josie Johnson Story	February 1, 2025			
Tractor Wars	February 2, 2025			
The Creole Pig: Haiti's Great Loss	February 3, 2025			
Shaking It Up: The Life and Times of Liz Carpenter	March 1, 2025			
The Philadelphia Eleven	March 1, 2025			
Local 1196: A Steelworkers Strike	March 1, 2025			
The Cost of Caring	March 1, 2025			
Coronation Girls	March 1, 2025		^{APT WORLDWIDE}	
Turning Point	March 17, 2025			
Graceball: The Story of Bobby Richardson	March 17, 2025			
The Black Sox Scandal: American Stories	March 23, 2025			
Tom Daley: Illegal to Be Me	March 31, 2025			
Water: The Sacred Gift	April 1, 2025			
Upstream, Downriver: Uniting for Water Justice	April 1, 2025			
Real Eyes	April 1, 2025			
Thirst for Power	April 1, 2025			
The Cure for Hate	April 1, 2025		^{APT WORLDWIDE}	
Kate: A Queen for the Future	April 1, 2025			
Edward & Wallis: The Bahamas Scandals	April 1, 2025			
Sominsai: The End of a 1000-Year-Old Festival	April 1, 2025			
The People Among the Plastic: Excess in the Anthropocene	April 1, 2025			
China's Road to Fortune or Peril	April 1, 2025			
Grace Kelly: The Missing Millions	April 1, 2025			
Life After Liberation: Holocaust Survivors in Post-War Germany	April 1, 2025			
Growing Up Jewish	April 1, 2025			
Crossroads of a Nation: Missouri's Indelible Role in American History	April 1, 2025			
The Greening of the Bronx: An Urban Garden Tale	April 1, 2025			
Quinceañera	April 1, 2025			
Willis "Bing" Davis: Reach High & Reach Back	April 2, 2025			
American Delivery	May 1, 2025			
The Kennedys: The Story of an American Dynasty	May 1, 2025			
About Face: Jewish Refugees in the Allied Forces	May 1, 2025			
Miles, Morale and Memories: Bob Hope and World War II	May 1, 2025		^{APT WORLDWIDE}	
Defying Death on the Atlantic	May 1, 2025			
Timeless Patriotism: Guam and World War II	May 15, 2025			
Blue: The Life and Art of George Rodrigue	May 29, 2025			
House Music – A Cultural Revolution: American Stories	June 1, 2025			
Dementia and Living Well	June 1, 2025			
From Fear to Hope: The HIV and AIDS Journey	June 1, 2025			
Always Looking: Titus Brooks Heagins	June 1, 2025			
Passage	June 1, 2025			
Post Atlantic: The Art of Dewey Crumpler	June 13, 2025			
WZZQ the Movie	August 1, 2025			
Arthur: A Life with the Royal Family	August 1, 2025			
The Future of Farming	August 1, 2025			
Atomic Echoes: Untold Stories from World War II	August 1, 2025			
Pictures from a Hiroshima Schoolyard	August 1, 2025			
Opportunity, Access & Uplift: The Evolving Legacy of HBCUs	September 1, 2025			
The Historic HBCU Photograph	September 1, 2025			
A Bridge to Life	September 1, 2025			
Deadly Alliance - Leopold and Loeb: American Stories	September 1, 2025			
Women's Work: The Untold Story of America's Female Farmers	September 1, 2025			
The Day of the Dead (El Día De Muertos)	October 1, 2025			
Stroke: The Circle of Healing	October 1, 2025		^{VMM}	
Stripped for Parts: American Journalism on the Brink	October 1, 2025			
Jeffrey's Journey	October 1, 2025			
I Am disABLEd	October 1, 2025			
From Rails to Trails	October 15, 2025			
Uncovering Boarding Schools: Stories of Resistance and Resilience	November 1, 2025		^{VMM}	
In the Wake of Justice Delayed	November 1, 2025		^{VMM}	
Greenland: Survival at the Edge of the World	November 1, 2025			
Return	November 1, 2025	(Note: 2023 version.)		
The True Cost of Defense	November 1, 2025			
Breaking Enigma: A World War II Game Changer	November 1, 2025		^{APT WORLDWIDE}	
The World of Olive Oil	November 1, 2025			
Price of Paradise	November 1, 2025			
Corpsman! Pearl Harbor	November 1, 2025		^{APT WORLDWIDE}	
Hollywood in Utah	November 1, 2025			
Crossroads of a Nation: Missouri's Rifts, Roads and Civil Rights	November 1, 2025			
Healing a Soldier's Heart	November 9, 2025			
Story Pole	November 15, 2025		^{VMM}	
The Divine Michelangelo	November 15, 2025			
Christmas in the Cotswolds	December 1, 2025			
A Celebration of Hanukkah	December 1, 2025			
London Parade: A Tribute to 40 Years	December 1, 2025			
Marked Man: Martin Luther King and the FBI	January 1, 2026			
The Last Musician of Auschwitz	January 1, 2026			
Bessie Coleman: Queen of the Skies	February 1, 2026			
A Fuller Education	February 1, 2026			
North to New York: The Great Migration in NY's Capital Region	February 1, 2026			
Echoes of Praise: Gospel Music in NY's Capital Region	February 1, 2026			
Secrets of WWII: Black GIs in Britain	February 1, 2026			
Desire: The Carl Craig Story	February 1, 2026			
Bigger than Africa	February 1, 2026			
Lithium Rising: The Race for Critical Minerals	February 1, 2026			
Raise Your Head Up: Freedom Colonies in America	February 1, 2026			
America's Stairway	March 1, 2026			
She Rises Up	March 1, 2026			
Eudora	March 1, 2026			
Lover, Beloved	March 1, 2026			
Built to Last: The Legacy of the Civilian Conservation Corps in Minnesota	March 1, 2026			
Iron Ladies	March 1, 2026			
From That Small Island: The Story of the Irish (Feature Film)	March 1, 2026			
Homesteading	March 1, 2026			
In Their Hands	April 1, 2026			
The Creation Rose	April 1, 2026			
October Shadows: An Exploration of Trauma and Healing After October 7	April 1, 2026			
Crossroads of a Nation: Missouri's Rhythm, Roads & Roots	April 1, 2026			
Enslaved: The Lost History of the Transatlantic Slave Trade	April 1, 2026			
Edward vs. George: The Windsors at War	April 1, 2026			
John Neumeier: A Creative Life	April 1, 2026			
Our Vanishing Americana: Florida	April 1, 2026			
The Ship That Turned Back	April 8, 2026			
The Everglades: A Symphony of Life	April 15, 2026			
Down the Duck with John Guider	April 15, 2026			
Friends & Neighbors: Stories of Hope & Healing	April 17, 2026	(Note: Originally titled Friends & Neighbors.)		
Tequila	May 1, 2026			
Home Is a Hotel	May 1, 2026			
Grandma Stand	May 1, 2026			
Red Story Rising: The Struggle for the American Communist Party	May 1, 2026			
Finding Manny	May 1, 2026			
Food Roots	May 1, 2026			
This Moment in America: Artists in the Heartland	May 1, 2026			
Stand Together as One	May 1, 2026		^{APT WORLDWIDE}	
Trolley Park: Great Lakes	May 1, 2026			
A Life Reimagined: The George Masa Story	May 1, 2026			
Unveiled: Daisy Bates and Johnny Cash	May 1, 2026			
The Montiers: An American Story	May 1, 2026			
Invisible Nation	May 9, 2026			
Waal River Crossing: 1944	May 15, 2026		^{APT WORLDWIDE}	
Michalopoulos: The Art of Celebration	May 28, 2026			
The War of 1812	June 1, 2026	(Note: Previously distributed by PBS.)		
Facing the Wind	June 1, 2026			
Armadillo Man: The Trips of Jim Franklin	June 1, 2026			
If I Could Stay / Si Pudiera Quedarme	June 1, 2026		^{LPB}	
Amerigo: The Search for the American Dream	June 1, 2026			
The Buskers New York	June 1, 2026			
Robert Duvall: Star of the Silver Screen	July 1, 2026			
Frederick Law Olmsted: Designing America	July 1, 2026			
The Legacy of 4-H	July 1, 2026			
Destination Detroit	July 1, 2026			
Before America	July 1, 2026			
America the Bountiful: America's 250th Anniversary Special	July 10, 2026	(Note: Also known as America the Bountiful: Declaration of Independence.)	^{CREATE}	
The Games in Black and White	August 1, 2026			
Achille Lauro: The Terror Cruise	August 1, 2026			
The Bröntes & Me: Sisters of Disruption	August 1, 2026			
Alhambra: The Lost Paradise	August 1, 2026			
The Dreamers and I	August 1, 2026			
The Whiskey Rebellion	August 1, 2026			
City of a Million Dreams	August 1, 2026			
Chatsworth Through Time	August 1, 2026			
Hiroshima Ground Zero: Eyewitness Accounts of 78 A-Bomb Survivors	August 1, 2026		^{NHK}	
The Declaration's Journey	September 1, 2026			
1001 Cuts	September 1, 2026			
Who's the We?	September 1, 2026			
Underground Railroad: The William Still Story	September 1, 2026			
Frontier to Freedom	September 1, 2026			
Young People's Continental Congress	September 1, 2026			
The Cultural Heart of Zen: Core Kyoto Special	September 1, 2026		^{NHK}	
Shenandoah	September 15, 2026			
Multiple Choice	September 15, 2026			
The Land Returns	October 1, 2026		^{VMM}	
She Cried That Day	October 1, 2026		^{VMM}	
American Rebels in Cuba	October 1, 2026			
Swamp Buggy Fever!	October 1, 2026			
A Nation Begins: The Maryland Statehouse at 250	October 1, 2026			
General Dodge and the Transcontinental Railroad	October 1, 2026			
Flight 823: Homage to Heroes	October 1, 2026			
Jonnie	October 1, 2026			
I Lied About My Age: A Marine in World War II	November 1, 2026		^{APT WORLDWIDE}	
Reservation Redemption	November 1, 2026		^{VMM}	
The Marines	November 1, 2026			
Road to Rome: World War II	November 1, 2026	(Note: Originally titled Road to Rome.)	^{APT WORLDWIDE}	
We Are the River: How the Mississippi Shaped Minnesota	November 1, 2026			
The Gettysburg Book: A Father, Son and the Killer Angels	November 1, 2026			
One in a Million	November 1, 2026			
A Sacred Thread	November 1, 2026			
Walking My Sister Home	November 1, 2026			
Bombing Brighton: The Plot to Kill Thatcher	November 1, 2026			
Anne Boleyn & Elizabeth I: Prisoner Queens	November 1, 2026			

==== Nature & science ====
===== 2010s =====
Title	Premiere date	Note(s)	Legend(s)	Source(s)
Phoenix Mars Mission: Onto the Ice	March 1, 2010			
Southwestern Gems: Our Desert National Parks	October 3, 2010			
A Walk in the Park with Nick Mollé: Birds Without Bolders	April 3, 2014			
To the Ends of the Earth: East Africa	November 7, 2018		^{APT WORLDWIDE}	

===== 2020s =====
Title	Premiere date	Note(s)	Legend(s)	Source(s)
To the Ends of the Earth: Birds of East Africa	April 14, 2020		^{APT WORLDWIDE}	
To the Ends of the Earth: The Natural World - Pushing Boundaries	February 3, 2021	(Note: The 1st release ended on February 2, 2025.) (Note: The 2nd release premiered on July 17, 2025.)	^{APT WORLDWIDE}	
Beauty on the Wing: Life Story of the Monarch Butterfly	February 7, 2022		^{APT WORLDWIDE}^{WORLD}	
To the Ends of the Earth: Avian Chronicles	March 19, 2025		^{APT WORLDWIDE}	
The Secret World of Guide Dogs with Martin Clunes	April 1, 2025			
The Piping Plovers of Moonlight Bay	April 1, 2025	(Note: Originally documentary genre.)	^{APT WORLDWIDE}	
The Real Jungle Book	May 1, 2025			
Space Explorers: Moonrise on the ISS	August 1, 2025			
Dr. Cliff: Worldwide Vet	September 1, 2025			
Burrowing Owls: A Love Story	July 1, 2026			
Will AI Take My Job?	September 30, 2026			

==== Art & culture ====
===== 2000s =====
Title	Premiere date	Note(s)	Legend(s)	Source(s)
Sister Wendy at the Norton Simon Museum	March 1, 2003	(Note: The 1st release ended on February 28, 2012.) (Note: The 2nd release premiered on July 22, 2012.)		

===== 2020s =====
Title	Premiere date	Note(s)	Legend(s)	Source(s)
Art + Medicine: Reflections on the Pandemic	March 22, 2022			
Rick Steves Art Prehistoric and Ancient	April 1, 2023		^{CREATE}	
Rick Steves Art of Ancient Rome	April 1, 2023		^{CREATE}	
Rick Steves Art of the Renaissance	April 1, 2023		^{CREATE}	
Rick Steves Art of the Middle Ages	April 1, 2023		^{CREATE}	
Rick Steves Art of the Baroque Age	April 1, 2023		^{CREATE}	
Rick Steves Art of the Modern Age	April 1, 2023		^{CREATE}	
Tales of Madness	September 15, 2023			
Moving Together	October 1, 2025			
Rick Steves Art of Europe: Michelangelo to Monet	November 21, 2025			
Rick Steves Art of Europe: Beauty Through the Ages	May 22, 2026			

==== Biography ====
===== 2010s =====
Title	Premiere date	Note(s)	Legend(s)	Source(s)
Julia Robinson and Hilbert's Tenth Problem	October 2, 2011			

===== 2020s =====
Title	Premiere date	Note(s)	Legend(s)	Source(s)
Discovering Maggie Smith	February 15, 2025			
Beyoncé & Solange: The Queen of Pop and Her Soul Sister	May 1, 2025			
Julie Andrews Forever	May 1, 2025			
Gene Hackman: Star of the Silver Screen	July 1, 2025			
Venus & Serena, The Game Changers	July 1, 2025			
Sean Connery vs. James Bond	November 1, 2025			
Teddy Pendergrass: If You Don't Know Me	February 1, 2026			
Diane Keaton: Star of the Silver Screen	March 1, 2026			
Robert Redford: Star of the Silver Screen	April 1, 2026			
Discovering Judi Dench	April 1, 2026			
Quincy Jones, Music Man	May 1, 2026			
The Unstoppable Shirley Maclaine	May 1, 2026			
Rob Reiner: The Director	May 1, 2026			
Bruce Lee, Enter the Dragon	May 1, 2026			
The Changing Face of Elton John	June 1, 2026			
Elisabeth von Trapp's Journey: Echoes of Sound	July 1, 2026			
Dr. Jack and Mr. Nicholson	July 1, 2026			
Warren Beatty: A Hollywood Obsession	October 1, 2026			
Stephen King: A Necessary Evil	October 1, 2026			
Jamie Lee Curtis: Hollywood Call of Freedom	October 1, 2026			

==== Aviation/military ====
===== 2020s =====
Title	Premiere date	Note(s)	Legend(s)	Source(s)
Flight of Legends: The Quest to Conquer the Atlantic	August 1, 2026			

=== News programs ===
==== News & public affairs ====
===== 2010s =====
Title	Premiere date	Note(s)	Legend(s)	Source(s)
NHK Newsline	April 12, 2010	(Note: aka Newsline in seasons 1-6.)	^{NHK}^{WORLD}	
Asia Insight	April 1, 2013		^{NHK}^{WORLD}	
GZERO World with Ian Bremmer	July 14, 2018		^{WORLD}	

===== 2020s =====
Title	Premiere date	Note(s)	Legend(s)	Source(s)
The Chavis Chronicles	October 1, 2020		^{APT WORLDWIDE}^{WORLD}	
Common Ground with Jane Whitney	June 15, 2021			
Laura Flanders & Friends	April 5, 2024		^{APT WORLDWIDE}^{WORLD}	
Live from the LBJ Library with Mark Updegrove	July 11, 2024			
Newsroom Tokyo	December 2, 2024		^{NHK}^{WORLD}	

==== Business & finance ====
===== 2020s =====
Title	Premiere date	Note(s)	Legend(s)	Source(s)
Opportunity Knocks	October 27, 2022			
My Money Mentors	April 1, 2025			

=== Entertainment programs ===
==== Drama ====
===== 2000s =====
Title	Premiere date	Note(s)	Legend(s)	Source(s)
Doc Martin	November 1, 2007			
Midsomer Murders	May 1, 2009			

===== 2020s =====
Title	Premiere date	Note(s)	Legend(s)	Source(s)
Hope Street	July 1, 2022			
Hijos del Desierto (Sons of the Desert)	January 1, 2024			
My Life Is Murder	April 1, 2024			
Foyle's War	June 1, 2024	(Note: Distributed by PBS (as part of Masterpiece Seasons 32, 38, 40, and 43 and Mystery! Seasons 24-25 and 27).)		
The Madame Blanc Mysteries	July 1, 2024			
New Blood	March 1, 2025			
Whitstable Pearl	April 1, 2025			
Dalgliesh	May 1, 2025			
Turn: Washington's Spies	June 1, 2025			
Captivated	June 1, 2025			
Under the Vines	August 1, 2025			
The Chelsea Detective	April 1, 2026			
Darby and Joan	November 1, 2026			
The Jewish Council	November 1, 2026			

==== Comedy ====
===== 2020s =====
Title	Premiere date	Note(s)	Legend(s)	Source(s)
The Cleaner	March 31, 2025			
How Are We Today?	September 15, 2025			

==== Music & entertainment ====
===== 2000s =====
Title	Premiere date	Note(s)	Legend(s)	Source(s)
Live from the Artists Den	February 1, 2009	(Note: Ended on September 17, 2021.) (Note: Returned June 1, 2026 as Lord Huron in season 14.)		

===== 2010s =====
Title	Premiere date	Note(s)	Legend(s)	Source(s)
All-Star Orchestra	September 4, 2013			

===== 2020s =====
Title	Premiere date	Note(s)	Legend(s)	Source(s)
Classical Tahoe	May 2, 2022			
Tradfest	August 30, 2023	(Note: aka Tradfest: The Dublin Castle Sessions in season 1.)		
Southern Songwriters with Patrick Davis	October 1, 2024			
Youth Music of the World	November 1, 2024			
Deconstructing the Beatles	February 28, 2025			
Stage	November 1, 2025	(Note: Distributed by PBS in season 1 and 2.)		
Live from the Artists Den: Reprise	January 1, 2026			
Anyone Can Sing	May 1, 2026			
The Songwriters	September 1, 2026	(Note: Distributed by NETA (aka National Educational Telecommunications Association) in seasons 1-3.)		

==== Feature film ====
===== 2010s =====
Title	Premiere date	Note(s)	Legend(s)	Source(s)
Public Television Feature Film Package	January 1, 2018			

=== Entertainment specials ===
==== Drama ====
===== 2020s =====
Title	Premiere date	Note(s)	Legend(s)	Source(s)
Midsomer Murders: 25 Years of Mayhem	March 1, 2023	(Note: The 1st release ended on March 31, 2025.) (Note: The 2nd release premiered on April 1, 2025.)		
Farewell Doc Martin	November 23, 2023	(Note: The 1st release ended on November 22, 2025.) (Note: The 2nd release will premiere on November 23, 2025.)		
Ball and Vase	November 27, 2024			
Nine Parts	April 1, 2025			

==== Music & entertainment ====
===== 2000s =====
Title	Premiere date	Note(s)	Legend(s)	Source(s)
Elvis '56	February 1, 2005	(Note: The 1st release ended on January 31, 2007.) (Note: The 2nd release premiered on August 1, 2007 and ended on July 31, 2009.) (Note: The 3rd release premiered on June 1, 2017 and ended on June 30, 2019.) (Note: The 4th release premiered on August 8, 2026.)		

===== 2010s =====
Title	Premiere date	Note(s)	Legend(s)	Source(s)
The B.E. Taylor Christmas Concert	December 1, 2010			
Discover Beethoven's 5th	March 1, 2011	(Note: The 1st release ended on February 28, 2014.) (Note: The 2nd release premiered on January 1, 2024.)	^{APT WORLDWIDE}	
A Celtic Awakening with Faith Marion Robinson	November 20, 2012	(Note: The 1st release ended on December 19, 2015.) (Note: The 2nd release premiered on March 1, 2023.)		
A Southern Celtic Christmas Concert	December 1, 2013	(Note: The 1st release ended on December 31, 2023.) (Note: The 2nd release premiered on December 1, 2025.)		
Childsplay: A Story of Fiddlers, Fiddles and a Fiddle Maker	April 1, 2014	(Note: The 1st release ended on March 31, 2016.) (Note: The 2nd release premiered on November 6, 2016.)		
Sharon Isbin: Troubadour	November 2, 2014		^{APT WORLDWIDE}	
Holiday Handbells: The Raleigh Ringers	November 16, 2014			
Music Row: Nashville's Most Famous Neighborhood	June 7, 2018			
Tom Lehrer: Live in Copenhagen 1967	June 2, 2019	(Note: The 1st release ended on June 30, 2021.) (Note: The 2nd release premiered on November 26, 2021 and ended on December 31, 2023.) (Note: The 3rd release premiered on January 1, 2024 and ended on December 31, 2025.) (Note: The 4th release premiered on January 23, 2026.)		

===== 2020s =====
Title	Premiere date	Note(s)	Legend(s)	Source(s)
Tim Janis Celtic Heart	February 23, 2020			
Crooked Stick: Songs in a Strange Land	March 23, 2020			
Amen! Music of the Black Church	April 26, 2020			
Childsplay: The Parting Glass	October 6, 2020			
Carole King and James Taylor Live at the Troubadour	February 28, 2021	(Note: The 1st release ended on March 31, 2022.) (Note: The 2nd release premiered on May 29, 2025.)		
Concert for George	February 24, 2022	(Note: The 1st release ended on March 31, 2024.) (Note: The 2nd release premiered on November 28, 2024.)		
Celtic Dreams: Daniel Hope's Hidden Irish History	March 11, 2022			
Frank Ferrante's Groucho	April 1, 2022		^{APT WORLDWIDE}	
John Williams: The Berlin Concert	August 12, 2022	(Note: The 1st release ended on October 31, 2024.) (Note: The 2nd release premiered on November 28, 2024 and will end on December 31, 2026.) (Note: The 3rd release will premiere on December 2026.)		
Anthony Williams' Urban Nutcracker	November 25, 2022			
Tamburitzans Presents Symbols	July 26, 2023			
Christmas at Westminster: An Evening of Readings and Carols	November 1, 2023			
George Perris: The Most Wonderful Time of the Year!	November 13, 2023			
Debbie Gibson Holiday: A Soundcheck Special	December 1, 2023			
A St. Thomas Christmas: Reflections of Gratitude	December 10, 2023			
American Rhapsody with the Ohio Valley Symphony	February 1, 2024			
A Symphony Celebration: The Blind Boys of Alabama with Dr. Henry Panion, III	February 1, 2024			
Dion Parson & 21st Century Band in Concert	March 1, 2024			
The Tragically Hip: A National Celebration	June 30, 2024			
The Four Phantoms in Concert	August 10, 2024			
Folk Americana Roots Hall of Fame: Inaugural Induction Ceremony	November 1, 2024			
Anacostia Delta: The Legacy of DC's Telemasters	November 10, 2024			
Showstoppers! Great Women of TV Variety	November 28, 2024			
Willie Nelson's 90th Birthday Celebration	November 28, 2024			
A Classic Christmas with the Bach Festival Society: Joyful Sounds	December 1, 2024			
Wes Montgomery: A Celebration Concert	February 1, 2025			
Ella Fitzgerald Live in Montreux 1969	February 14, 2025			
Stevie Ray Vaughan and Double Trouble Live at the El Mocambo	February 28, 2025			
Beethoven's 9th: Ode to Joy	March 1, 2025			
Rick Steves' Europe: A Symphonic Journey	April 1, 2025	(Note: 2025 version.)	^{APT WORLDWIDE}	
Neil Diamond: Hot August Night/NYC	May 30, 2025			
Rush: Time Machine - Live in Cleveland	June 30, 2025			
Gregorian: Pure Chants Live in Prague	August 1, 2025			
Electric Lady Studios: A Jimi Hendrix Vision	August 7, 2025			
The Carnival of More Animals	August 15, 2025			
Tim Janis: Our Natural World - Returning to Earth	November 1, 2025			
The United States Army Field Band: Sound the Bells	November 1, 2025			
The Nutcracker at the Jacobs School of Music	November 23, 2025			
Foo Fighters: Live at Wembley Stadium	November 27, 2025			
Rufus Wainwright Does Kurt Weill	November 27, 2025			
The Celtic Tenors: Live at the Empire	November 27, 2025			
A St. Thomas Christmas: Love Divide	December 23, 2025			
The London Parade 2026	January 1, 2026			
Rome New Year's Day Parade 2026	January 1, 2026			
King Celebration Concert	January 1, 2026			
More Deconstructing the Beatles	February 26, 2026	(Note: Originally titled Deconstructing the Beatles Part 2.)		
Luther Vandross: Live at Wembley	February 26, 2026			
Pavarotti 90: The Man Who Moved the World	February 26, 2026			
Four Seasons for the Five Senses	April 15, 2026			
Billy Joel: The 100th: Live at Madison Square Garden	May 28, 2026			
Supertramp: Live in Paris	May 28, 2026			
Sally: A Solo Play	June 1, 2026			
The Unlikely Union: A Storytelling Symphony of America	June 1, 2026			
Vicente Fernández: Un Azteca en el Azteca	August 8, 2026			
Reba McEntire Live in New York	August 8, 2026			
A Call to Freedom with the Ohio Valley Symphony	October 1, 2026			
Sound the Bells: A Holiday Celebration	November 1, 2026			
A Classic Christmas: Tidings of Joy with the Bach Festival Choir & Orchestra	November 1, 2026			

=== Children's programs ===
Title	Premiere date	Current season	Supplier(s)	Note(s)	Legend(s)	Source(s)
Biz Kid$	January 6, 2008	Reruns	WXXI	(Note: Business & finance genre from 2010 to 2017.)		
Roey's Paintbox	February 4, 2015	Reruns	WLVT			
Albie's Elevator	September 4, 2023	2	WHYY			
The Infinite Art Hunt	September 4, 2023	1	WHYY			
Mia & Codie	January 2, 2025	2	American Public Television			
Vegesaurs	April 1, 2025	1	American Public Television			
Skillsville	February 1, 2026	Reruns	Twin Cities PBS	(Note: Distributed by PBS Kids from 2025 to 2026.)		

=== Short-form programs ===
Title	Premiere date	Current season	Supplier(s)	Note(s)	Legend(s)	Source(s)
Flicks/Quick Pics	1990/1993	39/36	WHYY			
Rick Steves' Europe Travel Bites	April 2, 2005	9	Back Door Productions / OPB			
I'm Thinking of an Animal	September 1, 2013	Reruns	WXXI			
Blue Chip Kids	March 1, 2017	Reruns	WPBT	(Note: Originally children's genre.)		
Yoga Minutes with Stacey Millner-Collins	April 4, 2019	Reruns	South Carolina ETV			
Star Gazers	March 1, 2021	6	South Florida PBS	(Note: Distributed by PBS in 1976-2021½ seasons.)		
A Word on Words	August 1, 2024	Reruns	NPT			
Rick Steves Art Bites	October 1, 2024	1	American Public Television		^{APT WORLDWIDE}	
The Art of WellBeing	January 1, 2025	1	South Florida PBS			
Shakespeare's Greatest Hits	July 1, 2025	1	Buffalo Toronto Public Media			
States of America	November 1, 2026	1	KQED			

== Upcoming programming ==
=== Reality programs ===
==== How-to ====
Title	Premiere date	How to	Note(s)	Legend(s)	Source(s)
Beyond the Menu	2027	Cooking			

==== Travel ====
Title	Premiere date	Note(s)	Legend(s)	Source(s)
Coastal Adventures	January 1, 2027			
Travels with Darley	January 2027	(Note: Distributed by NETA (aka National Educational Telecommunications Association) in seasons 1-13.)	^{APT WORLDWIDE}^{CREATE}	

==== Lifestyle ====
Title	Premiere date	Note(s)	Legend(s)	Source(s)
Stay Curious with Audrey Lawrence	Winter/Spring 2027			

=== Reality specials ===
==== Travel ====
Title	Premiere date	Note(s)	Legend(s)	Source(s)
Nordic Train at Christmas	December 1, 2026			
Rick Steves Best of Istanbul	January 2027			

=== Documentary programs ===
==== Documentary ====
Title	Premiere date	Note(s)	Legend(s)	Source(s)
The Hills Are Alive: A Year at Kylemore Abbey	December 1, 2026			
Our Yorkshire Shop: A Victorian Restoration	January 1, 2027			
The Race for Ancient Egypt in Colour	January 1, 2027			

==== Art & culture ====
Title	Premiere date	Note(s)	Legend(s)	Source(s)
Don't Tell Me How to Art	TBA	(Note: Originally scheduled to premiere June 2026.) (Note: Delayed until further notice.)		

=== Documentary specials ===
==== Documentary ====
Title	Premiere date	Note(s)	Legend(s)	Source(s)
King of the Chitlin Circuit	November 23, 2026			
Destination London: Preparing for the Parade	December 1, 2026	(Note: Originally titled The London Parade 2027 Preview.)		
Frozen Frames: Murphy's Yellowstone	December 1, 2026			
The American Fuehrer	January 1, 2027			
Cradled by Grace	February 1, 2027			
Invisible Warriors: African American Women in World War II	February 1, 2027			
Language in Landscape: The Art of Frederic Church	February 2027			
Nashville's Soul: Civil Rights & Magic Guitars	February 2027			
Walk with Me	February 2027			
Tractor Wars II	February 2027			
Roadtrip Nation: Amplifying Intelligence	April 1, 2027			
Sequoias of the Sea	April 1, 2027			
Return to Carrascolendas: The Legacy of Aida Barrera	May 15, 2027			
Roadtrip Nation: Arts for All	June 1, 2027			
The Thomas Smallwood Story: From Chains to Champion	Summer/Fall 2027			
The Ghosts of History: The Life and Art of Hung Liu	2027			
Broken Ground	2027			
NIQIPIAQ: To Eat Real Food	2027		^{VMM}	

=== Entertainment specials ===
==== Music & entertainment ====
Title	Premiere date	Note(s)	Legend(s)	Source(s)
The London Parade 2027	January 1, 2027			
Rome New Year's Day Parade 2027	January 1, 2027			
Even More Deconstructing the Beatles	2027			
Discover Gershwin's Rhapsody in Blue	2027			
Zydeco Soul: A Creole Music Journey	2027			

== Unreleased programming ==
The following programs were planned to be distributed by American Public Television, but moved to other distributions or were scrapped for unknown reasons.

=== Reality programs ===
==== How-to ====
===== 1990s =====
Title	Planned premiere date	How to	Moved to	Supplier(s)	Note(s)	Legend(s)	Source(s)
Creole Cooking with Leah Chase	Summer 1999	Cooking	NETA (aka National Educational Telecommunications Association)	Leah Chase/Don Roussell Productions / WYES			
Go Wild in the Kitchen	Fall 1999	Cooking	N/A	Lark International; Wild Harvest Productions; WTVS			

===== 2000s =====
Title	Planned premiere date	How to	Moved to	Supplier(s)	Note(s)	Legend(s)	Source(s)
Frontera Cooking	Spring 2000	Cooking	N/A	Frontera Media Productions Inc. / WTTW	(Note: This title was renamed to Mexico: One Plate at a Time with Rick Bayless before it premiered May 20, 2000.)		
Gail Greco's Breakfast in America	Fall 2000	Cooking	N/A	Gail Greco / Maryland Public Television			
HomeStyles	Winter/spring 2001	N/A	Selected PBS member stations	Jewish Television Network / APT		^{APT WORLDWIDE}	
Jacques Pépin's Kitchen: Holidays & Celebrations	Spring 2001	Cooking	N/A	KQED			
The Healthy Kitchen with Dr. Andrew Weil and Rosie Daley	Winter/Spring 2002	Cooking	N/A	A La Carte Communications / APT			
Chow Down!	Fall 2003	Cooking	N/A	IWV Media Group Inc / KUHT			
Jacques Pépin: Short Cut Cooking	Winter/spring 2004	Cooking	N/A	KQED			
Hand to Mouth	Summer 2005	Gardening	N/A	Big Pond Productions Inc. / KVPT			
The Meaning of the 21st Century	Fall 2005	Self help	N/A	Three Roads Communications / APT			
Seasoned with Spirit	2006	Cooking	PBS	Native American Public Television / KCTS		^{CREATE}^{VMM}	
The Mark & Clark Expedition	2007	Cooking	N/A	Al Roker Productions / WNET			
A Home for Christy Rost	Summer 2008	Cooking	N/A	Eagle Ridge Media / APT			
Harvest Eating with Chef Keith Snow	September 2009	Cooking	N/A	Harvest Eating / APT			

===== 2010s =====
Title	Planned premiere date	How to	Moved to	Supplier(s)	Note(s)	Legend(s)	Source(s)
Jacques Pépin's Food, Fast...!	Spring 2011	Cooking	N/A	KQED			
Hiroko's Rules	Fall 2011	Cooking	N/A	Resolution Pictures / APT			
Barnstorming America	Fall 2012	Cooking	N/A	WXXI			
Four Senses with Christine Hà	Fall 2015	Cooking	N/A	Varner Productions Limited / APT			

==== Travel ====
===== 1990s =====
Title	Planned premiere date	Moved to	Supplier(s)	Note(s)	Legend(s)	Source(s)
Split Ticket	Winter 1999	N/A	Calamari Productions / WTTW			

===== 2000s =====
Title	Planned premiere date	Moved to	Supplier(s)	Note(s)	Legend(s)	Source(s)
Mom's the Word	Fall 2003	N/A	IWV Media Group Inc / KUHT			
Saddle Up!	Fall 2003	N/A	IWV Media Group Inc / KUHT			
Journeys in Africa	2005	NETA (aka National Educational Telecommunications Association)	KCTS			
Compass: China	Winter/Spring 2007	N/A	Tellus Works AS / APT			
Real Travel with Pauline Frommer	2007	N/A	Issues TV / OPB			
Beijing, Are You Ready?	Winter/Spring 2008	NETA (aka National Educational Telecommunications Association)	D3 Productions Inc. / KCSM			

===== 2010s =====
Title	Planned premiere date	Moved to	Supplier(s)	Note(s)	Legend(s)	Source(s)
Treasure Hunting America	2011	N/A	Compel Media / OPB			
Rick Steves' Europe 800	Fall 2014	N/A	Back Door Productions / APT	(Note: The 8th season of Rick Steves' Europe premiered on October 4, 2014.)		

==== Health ====
===== 2000s =====
Title	Planned premiere date	Moved to	Supplier(s)	Note(s)	Legend(s)	Source(s)
A Woman's Guide to Health	2002	N/A	Alvin H. Perlmutter / WNET			

==== Lifestyle ====
===== 2000s =====
Title	Planned premiere date	Moved to	Supplier(s)	Note(s)	Legend(s)	Source(s)
Collector's Café	Winter/Spring 2008	N/A	Public Media Production / APT			

===== 2010s =====
Title	Planned premiere date	Moved to	Supplier(s)	Note(s)	Legend(s)	Source(s)
Living the Wine Life with Jonathon Alsop	2011	N/A	Jay Fedigan Video / OPB			
Conscious Living (season 2)	Fall 2022	NETA (aka National Educational Telecommunications Association)	Conscious Living, LLC / APT		^{APT WORLDWIDE}	

=== Reality specials ===
==== How-to ====
===== 2000s =====
Title	Planned premiere date	How to	Moved to	Supplier(s)	Note(s)	Legend(s)	Source(s)
Belonging: The Search for Acceptance	April 2004	Self help	N/A	Windborne Productions / APT			
P. Allen Smith	Winter/Spring 2005	Gardening	N/A	Hortus Ltd. / APT			
How to Keep Your Brain Young, with Dr. Majid Fotuhi	Winter/Spring 2008	Self help	N/A	Maryland Public Television			

===== 2010s =====
Title	Planned premiere date	How to	Moved to	Supplier(s)	Note(s)	Legend(s)	Source(s)
Phil Lempert's Food Sense	Spring 2010	Cooking	PBS	Maryland Public Television			

=== Documentary programs ===
==== Documentary ====
===== 2000s =====
Title	Planned premiere date	Moved to	Supplier(s)	Note(s)	Legend(s)	Source(s)
Whispers of Angels	Winter/Spring 2002	N/A	Teleduction Inc. Quaker Hill Historic Preservation Foundation; APT	(Note: This title was renamed to Whispers of Angels: A Story of the Underground Railroad before it premiered February 3, 2002 as a special program.)		
A Gift of Love	Winter/spring 2004	N/A	Searchlight Entertainment; IWV Media Group Inc; Light Duty Productions; KUHT			
The Eisenhower Legacy	Fall 2006	N/A	Starbright Media Corp. / APT			
WWJD 2.1: What Would Jesus Do...in the 21st Century?	Fall 2006	N/A	KTWU			

===== 2010s =====
Title	Planned premiere date	Moved to	Supplier(s)	Note(s)	Legend(s)	Source(s)
Testing Milton Friedman	Winter 2012	PBS	Free To Choose Media / WTTW			
Unsung Heroes: The Story of America's Female Patriots	Spring 2014	NETA (aka National Educational Telecommunications Association)	Eleventh Day Entertainment / APT		^{APT WORLDWIDE}	

==== Nature & science ====
===== 2000s =====
Title	Planned premiere date	Moved to	Supplier(s)	Note(s)	Legend(s)	Source(s)
Ooomph!	2007	N/A	Ooomph Productions / OPB			
Wild by Nature	Fall 2009	N/A	First Light Films / KQED			

===== 2010s =====
Title	Planned premiere date	Moved to	Supplier(s)	Note(s)	Legend(s)	Source(s)
Alive! In America's Wetlands	Spring 2014	N/A	Louisiana Public Broadcasting			

==== Art & culture ====
===== 2000s =====
Title	Planned premiere date	Moved to	Supplier(s)	Note(s)	Legend(s)	Source(s)
Color TV	2002	N/A	National Minority Consortia / APT	(Note: This title was renamed to Colorvision before it premiered January 2, 2004.)		
Las Polleras: Hope in America	2003	N/A	Teleduction Inc. / APT			
Big Ideas: Caltech	Winter/Spring 2007	N/A	California Institute of Technology / WNET			

===== 2010s =====
Title	Planned premiere date	Moved to	Supplier(s)	Note(s)	Legend(s)	Source(s)
Books du Jour	Fall 2015	WNET	Altered Ego Entertainment / APT			

==== Aviation/military ====
===== 2000s =====
Title	Planned premiere date	Moved to	Supplier(s)	Note(s)	Legend(s)	Source(s)
Proud to Serve	Winter/Spring 2004	N/A	Two Cats Productions / American Public Television	(Note: This title was renamed to Proud to Serve: The Men and Women of the U.S. Army before it premiered March 1, 2004 as a special program.)		

=== Documentary specials ===
==== Documentary ====
===== 2000s =====
Title	Planned premiere date	Moved to	Supplier(s)	Note(s)	Legend(s)	Source(s)
Doc Counsilman: Making Waves	July 2004	WTIU	WTIU			
Turkey: The Roots and Rise of the Republic	Winter/Spring 2005	N/A	Ward Communications LLC. / APT			
Stop Crying in Silence	Winter/Spring 2005	PBS	Fanal Productions / NBPC			
WWJD: What Would Jesus Do?	Fall 2005	N/A	KTWU	(Note: This title was renamed to Beyond Theology: What Would Jesus Do? before it premiered April 1, 2007.)		
Luther: His Life, His Past, His Legacy	June 2007	Selected PBS member stations	BMG Global / APT			
Homemade Astronaut: The Clay Anderson Story	Winter/spring 2009	Nebraska Public Media	NET Television	(Note: Originally titled Homemade Astronaut: Clay Anderson's Journey to Space.)		
Beijing: Changed by the Olympics	Summer 2009	NETA (aka National Educational Telecommunications Association)	D3 Productions Inc. / KCSM			
The Profilers	Fall 2009	N/A	NET Television			

===== 2010s =====
Title	Planned premiere date	Moved to	Supplier(s)	Note(s)	Legend(s)	Source(s)
759: Boy Scouts of Harlem	Spring 2010	PBS	Be Prepared Pictures LLC. / Maryland Public Television			
Voices of a Never Ending Dawn	Spring 2010	PBS	Pamela Peak Productions / Detroit Public Television			
Manhood & Domestic Violence	2011	N/A	Hudson River Film and Video / APT			
Memory, Learning and Aging	Spring 2012	N/A	Santa Fe Productions Inc. / APT			
Free or Equal: A Personal View by Johan Norberg	Spring 2012	NETA (aka National Educational Telecommunications Association)	Free To Choose Media / APT	(Note: Originally titled Freedom vs. Equality: A Personal View by Johan Norberg.)		
Tailor Made: The Story of Rochester's Garment Industry	Winter 2016	WXXI	WXXI	(Note: Originally titled Rochester – Tailor Made: The History of Rochester's Garment Industry.)		
The Extraordinary Passage of the Great White Hunter	Summer 2016	N/A	Interlock Media, Inc. / APT			
Poi E: The Story of Our Song	Spring 2018	The 7th season of Pacific Heartbeat	Pacific Islanders in Communications / APT	(Note: Originally titled Poi E.) (Note: A stand-alone special.)		
Corridor Four	Winter/Spring 2019	The 8th season of Pacific Heartbeat	Pacific Islanders in Communications / PBS Hawai'i			

===== 2020s =====
Title	Planned premiere date	Moved to	Supplier(s)	Note(s)	Legend(s)	Source(s)
Living with Ghosts	Fall 2022	N/A	Jenny Pictures; Max Video Productions; KVIE			
Holocaust Warnings: American Antisemitism & Extremism	Winter 2024	NETA (aka National Educational Telecommunications Association)	WVIA			
K'anen'onwe: Original Seeds	Spring 2025	PBS Plus	Vision Maker Media / APT		^{VMM}	
Baseball: Echoes from the Bleachers	October 22, 2026	PBS	Copper Pot Pictures / APT			

==== Nature & science ====
===== 2020s =====
Title	Planned premiere date	Moved to	Supplier(s)	Note(s)	Legend(s)	Source(s)
Planet of the Plates	2026	NETA (aka National Educational Telecommunications Association)	PBS Distribution			

==== Art & culture ====
===== 2010s =====
Title	Planned premiere date	Moved to	Supplier(s)	Note(s)	Legend(s)	Source(s)
Words on the Wind	Winter 2011	N/A	Morning Light Films / WXXI	(Note: Volume 2.) (Note: Volume 1 was completed on November 1, 2009.) (Note: Volume 2 was planned to premiere.)		

==== Biography ====
===== 2000s =====
Title	Planned premiere date	Moved to	Supplier(s)	Note(s)	Legend(s)	Source(s)
Thomas H. Kean: An American Life	Winter/Spring 2007	N/A	Docere Palace Studios; CN Communications; APT			

===== 2010s =====
Title	Planned premiere date	Moved to	Supplier(s)	Note(s)	Legend(s)	Source(s)
Louis Sullivan: The Struggle for American Architecture	Spring 2012	N/A	Whitecap Films, Inc. / APT			
Margaret Fuller: The Evolution of a Utopianist — From Parlor Conversationalist to War Correspondent	2018	N/A	Interlock Media Inc. / APT			

=== News programs ===
==== News & public affairs ====
===== 1990s =====
Title	Planned Premiere date	Moved to	Supplier(s)	Note(s)	Legend(s)	Source(s)
WorldWatch	Spring 1998	N/A	Independent Television News/Lark International / WTVS			

===== 2000s =====
Title	Planned Premiere date	Moved to	Supplier(s)	Note(s)	Legend(s)	Source(s)
Great Entrepreneurs	Spring 2001	Selected PBS member stations	WPBT, Channel 2			
Hotline TV	Winter/Spring 2002	N/A	National Journal Group / WETA			

==== Business & finance ====
===== 2000s =====
Title	Planned premiere date	Moved to	Supplier(s)	Note(s)	Legend(s)	Source(s)
Your Money with Jean Chatzky and Money Magazine	Summer 2007	N/A	WETA	(Note: Originally titled Jean Chatzky's Money Club.)		

===== 2010s =====
Title	Planned premiere date	Moved to	Supplier(s)	Note(s)	Legend(s)	Source(s)
Mark Matson's Main Street Money	Winter 2012	N/A	Veras Communications Inc. / APT			

=== Entertainment programs ===
==== Drama ====
===== 2000s =====
Title	Planned premiere date	Moved to	Supplier(s)	Note(s)	Legend(s)	Source(s)
Randall & Hopkirk (Deceased)	Winter 2001	N/A	Working Title Television / APT			

==== Comedy ====
===== 2010s =====
Title	Planned premiere date	Moved to	Supplier(s)	Note(s)	Legend(s)	Source(s)
The Best of British Comedy	Fall 2010	N/A	APT			
Mum	July 1, 2018	Selected PBS member stations	Big Talk Productions / APT			

==== Music & entertainment ====
===== 2000s =====
Title	Planned premiere date	Moved to	Supplier(s)	Note(s)	Legend(s)	Source(s)
The 92nd Street Y Presents	Winter/spring 2001	NETA (aka National Educational Telecommunications Association)	Jewish Television Network / APT			

===== 2010s =====
Title	Planned premiere date	Moved to	Supplier(s)	Note(s)	Legend(s)	Source(s)
The Music Nomad	Winter 2010	N/A	Tantra Inc. / APT			

=== Entertainment specials ===
==== Drama ====
===== 2020s =====
Title	Planned premiere date	Moved to	Supplier(s)	Note(s)	Legend(s)	Source(s)
Christmas Carole	December 1, 2024	Selected PBS member stations	Sky TV / APT			

==== Music & entertainment ====
===== 2000s =====
Title	Planned premiere date	Moved to	Supplier(s)	Note(s)	Legend(s)	Source(s)
Appalachia Waltz	August 2000	N/A	PBS Wisconsin			
Bobby Short, An American Journey in Song	January 1, 2006	N/A	APT			
Isley Brothers	March 2006	N/A	APT			
Jam! The Best of Live Music	Winter/Spring 2008	N/A	Jam LLC. / APT			
Pavlo's Passion	Winter/Spring 2008	N/A	Detroit Public Television			

===== 2010s =====
Title	Planned premiere date	Moved to	Supplier(s)	Note(s)	Legend(s)	Source(s)
Festival Express	Winter 2011	N/A	Optimum Releasing Ltd. / APT			
Daniel O'Donnell: The Best of Music and Memories	Winter 2015	N/A	Detroit Public Television			

===== 2020s =====
Title	Planned premiere date	Moved to	Supplier(s)	Note(s)	Legend(s)	Source(s)
Yoshiki Classical Live from Royal Albert Hall	Spring 2025	N/A	Alist Media Entertainment / APT			

=== Children's programs ===
==== American Program Service ====
Title	Planned premiere date	Moved to	Supplier(s)	Note(s)	Legend(s)	Source(s)
Frank's Garage	1996	N/A	QED Communications / WQED-TV	(Note: A pilot episode aired at once on WQED-TV.)		

==== American Public Television ====
Title	Planned premiere date	Moved to	Supplier(s)	Note(s)	Legend(s)	Source(s)
The Cory the Clown Show	Winter/spring 2003	N/A	Funny Productions; Corlin Productions LLC. WYES	(Note: A full series of Cory's Learning Corner.)		
KidsWorld Sports	Fall 2003	PBS Kids Go! (website only)	Breakthrough Entertainment; Clearchannel Communications; WETA			
Cookalotamus	2003	N/A	Scooterhill Studios / KCTS			

== See also ==
- List of PBS member stations
- List of programs broadcast by PBS
- List of programs broadcast by PBS Kids
- List of programs broadcast by Create
- List of worldwide programs distributed by American Public Television
