= List of programs broadcast by PBS =

The following is a list of programs currently or formerly distributed through the American PBS stations and other public television entities.

== Current programming ==
- ^{1} Syndicated to public television stations by the National Educational Telecommunications Association
- ^{2} Syndicated to public television stations by Executive Program Services
- ^{3} Syndicated to public television stations by WestLink
- ^{4} Running only on selected PBS stations
- ^{5} Reruns are available to public television stations

=== Original programming ===
- Washington Week (1967)
- American Black Journal (1968)
- Masterpiece (1971)
- Great Performances (1972)
- Nova (1974)
- PBS NewsHour (1975)
- Austin City Limits (1976)
- The Woodwright's Shop (1979)
- This Old House (1979)
- MotorWeek (1981)
- Nature (1982)
- Frontline (1983)
- American Masters (1986)
- American Experience (1988)
- P.O.V. (1988)
- Ciao Italia (1989)
- Antiques Roadshow (1997)
- Independent Lens (1999)
- Secrets of the Dead (2000)
- Ask This Old House (2002)
- BBC World News America (2019)
- Finding Your Roots (2012)
- Reel South (2016)
- Destination Craft with Jim West (2017)
- Amanpour & Company (2018)
- Beyond 100 Days (2018)
- We'll Meet Again (2018)
- Prehistoric Road Trip (2020)
- Tell Me More with Kelly Corrigan (2020)
- The Trouble with Maggie Cole (2020)
- When Disaster Strikes (2021)

=== Programming from American Public Television ===
| Title | Year |
|---|---|
| Scully: The World Show | 1983 |
| For Your Home | 1996 |
| Rick Steves' Europe | 2000 |
| America's Test Kitchen | 2001 |
| New Scandinavian Cooking | 2003 |
| Midsomer Murders | 2004 |
| Consuelo Mack WealthTrack | 2005 |
| Cook's Country | 2008 |
| Joseph Rosendo's Travelscope | 2009 |
| Pati's Mexican Table | 2011 |
| Sara's Weeknight Meals | 2011 |
| Lidia's Kitchen | 2013 |
| Articulate | 2015 |
| Lucky Chow | 2016 |
| Samantha Brown's Places to Love | 2018 |

=== Acquired programming ===
- The American Woodshop^{1} (1993)
- BBC World News Today (2018)
- Broadway Sandwich (2019)
- Closer to Truth^{2} (2008)
- Cobra (2020)
- Creative Living with Sheryl Borden^{3} (1976)
- The Daytripper^{1} (2010)
- Democracy Now!^{3} (2001)
- Fons & Porter's Love of Quilting^{1} (2003)
- GardenSMART'^{1} (2001)
- Green
- Martha Bakes
- Martha Stewart's Cooking School
- Men at Work
- The Open Mind^{1} (1956)
- Simple Living with Wanda Urbanska
- Sit and Be Fit^{1} (1987)
- Start Up^{1} (2013)
- A Taste of History^{1} (2008)
- Texas Parks & Wildlife^{1} (1985)
- This Is America & the World with Dennis Wholey^{1} (1998)
- WoodSongs^{1} (2006)

== Former programming ==
=== Original programming ===
- 3-2-1 Contact (1980–92)
- A.M. Weather (1978–95)
- The Advocates (1969–74, 1978–79, 1984)
- Africa (2013)
- America's Ballroom Challenge (2006–09)
- American Playhouse (1982–99)
- Are You Being Served?
- Art of the Western World (1989)
- As Time Goes By
- Baking with Julia (1996–1999)
- BBC World News
- Behind the Lines (1971–76)
- Bill Moyers Journal (1972–76; 1978–81; 2007–10)
- Biography of America
- Carrascolendas
- Carrier (2008)
- Celtic Thunder
- Celtic Woman
- Charlie Rose (1991–2017)
- A Chef's Life (2013–18)
- Childhood
- China: A Century of Revolution (1989–1997)
- Click and Clack's As the Wrench Turns (2008)
- Columbus and the Age of Discovery
- Computer Chronicles (1983–2002)
- Connect With English (1998)
- The Constitution: That Delicate Balance (1984)
- Cosmos: A Personal Voyage (1980)
- The Creation of the Universe
- Crucible of Empire (1999)
- Dave Allen at Large (1971–79)
- Day at Night (1973–74)
- Degrassi High (1990–95)
- Degrassi Junior High (1987–91)
- design: e2
- Destinos (1992)
- The Dick Cavett Show (1977–82)
- Discover The World of Science (1982–90)
- Discovering Psychology: Updated Edition
- Doctor Who (1970–90)
- Don't Look Now (1983)
- EGG, the Arts Show (2000–05)
- The Electric Company (1971–85)
- Ethics in America (1988–89)
- Evening at Pops (1970–2005)
- Everyday Food (2003–12)
- Feeling Good
- Firing Line
- Fokus Deutsch
- Free to Choose
- The French Chef
- French in Action
- The Frugal Gourmet
- GED Connection
- Genius by Stephen Hawking (2016)
- The Health Quarterly
- Healthful Indian Flavors with Alamelu
- History Detectives (2003–14)
- Hollywood Television Theatre (1970–78)
- Hometime (1986–2016)
- In the Mix (1991–2012)
- The Infinite Voyage
- Infinity Factory
- Inside Nature's Giants
- Inspector Morse
- Irasshai
- It's Strictly Business
- Jazz (2001)
- Julia and Jacques Cooking at Home
- Keeping Up Appearances
- Kokoro: The Heart Within (1995)
- Learn to Read
- Life on Fire
- Lilias, Yoga and You
- Literary Visions
- Little Snack
- Long Ago and Far Away (1989–94)
- Martin Agronsky: Evening Edition (1975–76)
- Matinee at the Bijou
- The McLaughlin Group (1982–2016)
- The Mechanical Universe
- Meeting of Minds
- Mercy Street (2016–17)
- The Mind (1988)
- Mr. Bean
- Mystery! (1980–2006)
- National Geographic Specials (1975-1994)
- New Project 300
- The New Red Green Show
- The New Yankee Workshop
- Newton's Apple (1983–99)
- Nova ScienceNow
- NOW
- Odyssey (1980-1981)
- On Tour
- Once Upon A Classic
- Over Easy
- OWL/TV (1985–91)
- The Pallisers
- PBS American Portrait (2021)
- A Place of Our Own (1998–2011)
- The Power of Choice (1988–91)
- Powerhouse (1982–83)
- Race to Save the Planet
- Ramona (1988–90)
- Reading Rainbow (1983–2006)
- Rebop (1976–79)
- Religion & Ethics Newsweekly (1997–2017)
- Roadtrip Nation
- The Romagnolis' Table
- Say Brother
- Sessions at West 54th
- Shining Time Station (1989–98)
- Silver Screen: host Thomas Guback
- Sneak Previews
- Soul! (1968–73)
- Soundstage
- Square One Television (1987–94)
- Studio See (1977–79)
- Taking the Lead: The Management Revolution
- Talking with David Frost
- Tavis Smiley (2004–2017)
- Thirty Minutes With... (1971–73)
- Tony Brown's Journal
- Trying Times
- The Two Ronnies
- Vegetable Soup
- The Vicar of Dibley
- The Victory Garden (1975–2015)
- Villa Alegre
- Voices & Visions
- Walk Through the 20th Century with Bill Moyers
- Wall $treet Week
- Washington Connection (1974)
- Washington Straight Talk (1973–75)
- The Western Tradition
- Where in the World Is Carmen Sandiego? (1991–96)
- Wide Angle
- Wild America
- Wired Science
- WonderWorks (1984–90)
- The World of Chemistry
- Zoobilee Zoo (1988–92)
- Zoom (1972–78)

=== Programming from American Public Television ===
| Title | Premiere date | End date | Source(s) |
|---|---|---|---|
| Monty Python's Flying Circus | 1974 | 1979 | |
| Monty Python's Flying Circus | 1983 | 1988 | |
| Nightly Business Report | 1979 | 2019 | |
| The Paper Chase | January 15, 1981 | 1982 | |
| The Hitchhiker's Guide to the Galaxy | 1982 | 1984 | |
| The Joy of Painting^{5} | 1983 | 1994 | |
| Captain Kangaroo | 1986 | 1993 | |
| Globe Trekker | 1994 | | |
| Ballykissangel | 1998 | | |
| Wai Lana Yoga^{5} | 2000 | 2008 | |
| Burt Wolf: Travels & Traditions | 2000 | | |
| Mexico: One Plate at a Time | 2003 | 2019 | |
| P. Allen Smith's Garden Home^{5} | | | |
| Live from the Artists Den | 2008 | 2019 | |
| Rough Cut | 2009 | | |
| The Short List | | | |

=== Acquired programming ===
| Title | Premiere date | End date | Source(s) |
|---|---|---|---|
| Big Blue Marble | 1974 | 1983 | |
| Polka Dot Door | 1981 | 1988 | |
| Sewing with Nancy^{1} ^{5} | 1982 | 2017 | |
| Today's Special | 1984 | 1994 | |
| The Red Green Show^{2} ^{5} | 1994 | 2006 | |

== Special programming ==
| Title | Initial broadcast date | Source(s) |
|---|---|---|
| Wild Alaska Live | July 29, 2017 | |

== See also ==
- List of PBS member stations
- List of programs broadcast by Create
- List of programs broadcast by PBS Kids
- List of programs broadcast by American Public Television
