= List of programs broadcast by Create =

This is the list of programs broadcast by Create.

== A ==
- America Quilts Creatively
- America Sews with Sue Hausmann
- America's Test Kitchen
- American Workshop
- Anywhere, Alaska
- Around the House with Matt & Shari
- Ask This Old House

== B ==
- Baking with Julia
- Barbecue America (also known as BBQ America)
- Barbecue University with Steven Raichlen
- BBQ With Franklin
- Beads, Baubles & Jewels
- The Best of the Joy of Painting
- Best Recipes in the World with Mark Bittman
- Burt Wolf: Taste of Freedom
- Burt Wolf: Travels and Traditions
- Burt Wolf: What We Eat

== C ==
- Caprial and John's Kitchen: Cooking for Family and Friends
- Chefs A' Field: Culinary Adventures That Begin On The Farm
- Chefs of Napa Valley
- Christina Cooks
- Ciao Italia
- Classic Woodworking
- Coastal Cooking with John Shields
- Cook's Country
- Cooking 80-20 with Robin Shea
- The Cooking Odyssey
- Cooking with Nick Stellino
- Cooking with Todd English
- Cultivating Life

== D ==
- Daisy Cooks! With Daisy Martinez
- Donna's Day
- Double Happiness

== E ==
- Ellie's Real Good Food
- Endless Feast
- Equitrekking
- Essential Pepin

== F ==
- Fit 2 Stitch
- Flavors of America with Chef Jim Coleman
- Fons and Porter's Love of Quilting
- Food Trip with Todd English
- For Your Home
- The French Chef (otherwise known as French Chef Classics)

== G ==
- Garden Smart
- Gary Spetz's Painting Wild Places! With Watercolors
- Glass with Vicki Payne
- Globe Trekker
- Gourmet's Diary of a Foodie
- Grilling Maestros
- Growing a Greener World

== H ==
- Healthful Indian Flavors with Alamelu
- Holiday Table with Chris Fennimore and Dede Wilson
- Hometime
- How to Cook Everything

== I ==
- In the Americas with David Yetman
- Ireland: The Roads Taken with Tommy Makem

== J ==
- J Schwanke's Life In Bloom
- Jacques Pépin: Fast Food My Way
- Jacques Pépin: Heart And Soul
- Jane Butel's Southwestern Kitchen
- Jazzy Vegetarian
- Joanne Weir's Cooking Class
- Joanne Weir's Cooking Confidence
- The Joy of Painting
- Julia and Jacques Cooking at Home

== K ==
- Katie Brown Workshop
- Kitchen Sessions with Charlie Trotter
- Knit and Crochet Now

== L ==
- Lap Quilting with Georgia Bonesteel
- Legacy List with Matt Paxton
- Lidia's Family Table
- Lidia's Italian-American Kitchen
- Lidia's Italy
- Lidia's Kitchen
- Lucky Chow

== M ==
- Martha Bakes
- Martha Stewart's Cooking School
- Martha's Sewing Room
- Martin Yan's Chinatowns
- Martin Yan's Quick & Easy
- Martin Yan's Taste Of Vietnam
- Master Class at Johnson & Wales
- Mexico: One Plate at a Time
- Moveable Feast with Fine Cooking

== N ==
- New Jewish Cuisine with Jeff Nathan and Friends
- New Orleans Cooking with Kevin Belton
- New Scandinavian Cooking with Andreas Viestad
- New Scandinavian Cooking with Tina Nordström
- The New Yankee Workshop
- Nick Stellino: Cooking with Friends
- Nick Stellino: Storytelling in the Kitchen
- Nick Stellino's Family Kitchen

== O ==
- One Stroke Painting with Donna Dewberry

== P ==
- P. Allen Smith's Garden Home
- PAINT! PAINT! PAINT!
- Paint, Paper and Crafts
- Painting and Travel with Roger and Sarah Bansemer
- Passport to Adventure
- Pati's Mexican Table

== Q ==
- Quilt Central

== R ==
- Rick Steves' Europe
- Rick Steves' Europe Classics
- Rough Cut with Fine Woodworking
- Rough Cut - Woodworking with Tommy Mac
- Rudy Maxa's World

== S ==
- Scrapbook Memories
- Seasoned Traveler
- Seasonings with Dede Wilson
- Seasonings with Dede Wilson: Cooking and Entertaining for Special Occasions
- Sewing with Nancy
- Simply Ming
- Smart Gardening
- Smart Travels: Europe
- Smart Travels: Pacific RIM

== T ==
- This Old House
- Tommy Makem's Ireland
- Travels In Mexico and the Caribbean with Shari Belafonte

== V ==
- The Victory Garden

== W ==
- Weir Cooking in the City
- Wine, Food & Friends with Karen MacNeil
- Woodturning Workshop
- World's Fair of Quilts: for the Love of Fabric

== Y ==
- Yan Can Cook: Spice Kingdom
- You're The Chef
