= Tom McDonald =

Tom McDonald may refer to:

- Tom McDonald (winemaker) (1907–1987), New Zealand wine-maker
- Tommy McDonald (footballer, born 1895) (1895–1969), Scottish football forward for Newcastle United, also known as Tom
- Tom McDonald (soccer) (born 1959), American soccer player
- Tom McDonald (diplomat) (born 1953), former U.S. Ambassador to Zimbabwe
- Tom McDonald (Australian footballer) (born 1992), Australian rules footballer for Melbourne Football Club
- Tom McDonald (politician) (born 1946), member of the Missouri House of Representatives

== See also ==
- Tom MacDonald (disambiguation)
- Tommy McDonald (disambiguation)
- Thomas McDonald (disambiguation)
