= Tommy Mac =

Tommy Mac may refer to:

- Tommy Mac (musician) (born 1971), Canadian musician
- Tommy Mac (carpenter) (born 1966), American carpenter and woodworker

== See also ==
- Thomas MacDonald (disambiguation)
