= Thomas McDonald =

Thomas, Tom or Tommy McDonald may refer to:

== Sports ==
- Tom McDonald (footballer, born 1887) (1887–?) English footballer, see List of Bury F.C. players
- Tommy McDonald (footballer, born 1895) (1895–1969), Scottish football forward for Rangers, Newcastle United and York City also known as Tom
- Tommy McDonald (footballer, born 1930) (1930–2004), Scottish footballer of the 1950s and 1960s
- Tommy McDonald (American football) (1934–2018), American football player
- Tom McDonald (soccer) (born 1959), American soccer player
- Tom McDonald (Australian footballer) (born 1992), Australian rules footballer for Melbourne Football Club

== Politics ==
- Thomas McDonald, Jr. (1865–?), American politician
- Thomas William McDonald (1869–1968), New Zealand politician
- Thomas J. McDonald (1883-1931), American reporter and politician from New York
- Thomas Pringle McDonald (1901–1969), Scottish lawyer and politician
- Thomas McDonald (Australian politician) (1915–1992), member of the Tasmania House of Assembly
- Tom McDonald (politician) (born 1946), member of the Missouri House of Representatives
- Tom McDonald (diplomat) (born 1953), former U.S. Ambassador to Zimbabwe

== Others ==
- Tom McDonald (winemaker) (1907–1987), New Zealand wine-maker
- Thomas Buddy McDonald (1922–2008), American child actor

== See also ==
- Andrew Thomas McDonald
- Thomas MacDonald (disambiguation)
