= Tommy McDonald =

Tommy McDonald may refer to:

- Tommy McDonald (American football) (1934–2018), American football player
- Tommy McDonald (footballer, born 1895) (1895–1969), Scottish football forward for Rangers, Newcastle United and York City
- Tommy McDonald (footballer, born 1930) (1930–2004), Scottish footballer of the 1950s and 1960s

== See also ==
- Tom McDonald (disambiguation)
- Thomas McDonald (disambiguation)
