= Thomas MacDonald =

Thomas MacDonald or Tom MacDonald may refer to:

== Thomas MacDonald ==
- Thomas Logie MacDonald (1901–1973), Scottish astronomer
- Thomas Harris MacDonald (1881–1957), American road-builder
- Thomas MacDonald (cricketer) (1908–1998), Irish cricketer
- Thomas H. MacDonald, British stage and film actor
- Thomas Kennedy Macdonald (1847–1914), New Zealand politician
- Tommy Mac (carpenter) (born 1966), American carpenter and woodworker

== Tom MacDonald ==
- Tom Macdonald (politician) (1898–1980), New Zealand politician
- Tom Macdonald (writer) (1900–1980), Welsh journalist and novelist
- Tom MacDonald (rapper) (born 1988), Canadian musician
- Tommy Mac (musician) (born 1971), Canadian musician

== See also ==
- Thomas Macdonald-Paterson (1844–1906), politician
- Thomas McDonald (disambiguation)
- Tom McDonald (disambiguation)
