= Jane Butel =

American cook and television host

- Education: Kansas State University
- Occupations: Cook; Television Host

Jane Butel is an American cook and television host, specializing in cuisine of the Southwestern United States and Tex-Mex cooking. She has published numerous books, and was the host of the Create show Jane Butel's Southwestern Kitchen. She is a graduate of Kansas State University, and founded the Jane Butel Cooking School.

== Bibliography ==
- Chili Madness, Workman Publishing Company (1980)
- Jane Butel's Tex-Mex Cookbook, Harmony Books (1980)
- Hotter Than Hell: Hot and Spicy Dishes from Around the World, HPBooks (1987)
- Fiesta: Southwest Entertaining with Jane Butel, HarperCollins (1987)
- Jane Butel's Southwestern Kitchen, HPBooks (1994)
- Fiestas for Four Seasons: Southwest Entertaining with Jane Butel, Clear Light Books (1996)
- Real Women Eat Chiles, Cooper Square Publishing (2006)
