= Matinee at the Bijou =

Anthology television series

1981 Season Two press kit cover, designed by Carl Darnell

Matinee at the Bijou is a television series that premiered nationally on PBS in 1980. It recreated the American moviegoing experiences of the 1930s and the 1940s, with trailers, a cartoon, one or more selected short subjects, a cliffhanger serial chapter "to be continued," and a tightly edited feature presentation. The 90-minute series ran for five consecutive first-run seasons, each consisting of 16 episodes, and continued on PBS for three subsequent years in reruns. The series was an independent production from Bijou Productions, Inc., of Medford, Oregon.

== Overview ==
Going to the movies prior to 1960, and especially prior to the advent of television, could last for several hours, and include many short films along with a single- or double-feature presentation. Each episode of Matinee at the Bijou had only 90 minutes to replicate an authentic theater program, so the weekly serial chapter was usually shortened to about half its length and the feature attraction was always edited down to about an hour. Thus the casual viewer got the flavor of the old movie marathons in smaller portions. During the first season the 16mm film prints were physically cut and spliced to fit the time slot; subsequent seasons used video technology to accomplish the editing.

With Matinee at the Bijou, PBS, known for presenting highbrow, how-to and educational content, gave America a weekly dose of cinematic entertainment for eight years, and the series went on to become a pop-culture phenomenon on television and college campuses.

Key in producing the show was the creative use of public-domain content, as the cost of licensing content from the major studios was prohibitive. All of the short subjects and serials, as well as the feature films, were in the public domain except one: a single, first-season broadcast of Bulldog Drummond's Bride (1939). The Bijou producers and the film supplier presumed the film to be out of copyright, only to find later that the literary rights to the character Bulldog Drummond were still protected. The Drummond film was withdrawn from the series and replaced with a Pinky Tomlin musical.

Betty Boop was the official Matinee at the Bijou mascot, and many Betty Boop cartoons were featured on the show, along with many other famous cartoon characters. Later seasons of the program included Soundies, three-minute musicals that never played in theaters; these lent a nostalgic touch to Bijou without using up too much time.

The theme music played during the opening credits was titled "At the Bijou," and was performed (in a new recording) by crooner Rudy Vallee and composed by Rich Mendoza.

In 1995, an international television distributor, TV Matters, Inc., bought the broadcast rights to the series, and with the help of the series’ producers undertook a makeover updating the opening sequences and retaining only the best film elements from the original 80 episodes. A total of 52 remastered episodes were re-released to many PBS affiliates and also marketed overseas.

== Scheduling ==
Matinee at the Bijou was considered a "fringe-time" series, and episodes were fed to PBS member stations for scheduling any way they chose. Most stations ran the series on weekend mornings or afternoons. Several PBS stations, such as KCET in Los Angeles, chose to strip Matinee at the Bijou for daily afternoon or morning broadcasts. One West Coast affiliate found ratings success running the series on Saturday nights at 10:00pm, as a lead-in to Saturday Night Live audiences. National Nielsen ratings for the first-run episodes were mostly in the 4.0 to 5-7 ranges, reported as unprecedented for a non-prime time PBS fringe-time series.

== Hosts and producers ==
For the first three seasons, Matinee at the Bijou was hosted by actor Scott DeVenney. In 1983 the opening format was changed, the host was dropped, and a Sneak Previews-style opening was used, in order to reduce the amount of editing required to fit the content into the 90-minute slot.

Bob Campbell and John Galbraith, series co-creators and producers, presented their concept to PBS in 1979, were given a green light, and Matinee at the Bijou had its national premiere the following year. Galbraith left the series, along with host Scott DeVenney, in 1982, and producer Campbell continued on as executive producer and producer of the following two seasons and the re-release ten years later.

== Funders ==
In 1980, when Matinee at the Bijou was first licensed by PBS, national programs were voted on and chosen by program managers of member stations, rather than national program chiefs. The stations effectively voted their available program dollars in a series of voting "preference rounds." The Matinee series made the cut for five consecutive seasons, but was not picked up in 1985 due to diminishing programming dollars and the need to spend what was available on core series like Nova, Mystery! and Masterpiece Theatre. The Dick Cavett Show, another very popular series but one "not critical to the PBS core mission," had been eliminated the year before.
