= A Craftsman's Legacy =

- Genre: Documentary
- Starring: Eric Gorges
- Country of origin: United States
- No. of seasons: 4
- No. of episodes: 52

Production
- Producer: Hammer in Hand Productions

Original release
- Network: Syndication
- Release: 2014 – present

A Craftsman's Legacy is an American television series. The series host, Eric Gorges, tours the United States in search of those who take pride in a particular skill. Each week an artisan of a particular crafts, such as creating horse saddles, is showcased.

The show initially debuted on public television in October 2014, and is distributed by APT.
