= Maria Loi =

Greek chef, author and TV personality

Maria Loi is a Greek chef, author, and television personality. She specializes in Greek cuisine. She is the host of The Life of Loi: Mediterranean Secrets, a cooking show that airs on PBS. She has been called the "Julia Child of Greece."
