= Rough Cut with Fine Woodworking =

- Also known as: Classic Woodworking
- Genre: Woodworking
- Presented by: Tom McLaughlin
- Country of origin: United States
- Original language: English
- No. of seasons: 8

Production
- Production location: Canton, Massachusetts
- Running time: 27 minutes
- Production company: WGBH-TV

Original release
- Network: WGBH-TV
- Release: 2009 – December 24, 2016

Classic Woodworking (previously Rough Cut: Woodworking with Tommy Mac and Rough Cut with Fine Woodworking) is a woodworking television show hosted by woodworker Tom McLaughlin that is produced by WGBH Boston in partnership with Fine Woodworking. The show is distributed by American Public Television.

== Overview ==
The show was originally known as Rough Cut: Woodworking with Tommy Mac and was hosted by Thomas J. MacDonald. Presented as an instructional woodworking tutorial, Tommy Mac guided the viewer through the necessary steps to create tables, cabinets, chairs, and many more artisan woodworks. Each episode featured a particular creation and chronicles Tommy's work from conception to completion, thus allowing the viewer to replicate the work in their own shop. The show displayed a range of woodworking skills and techniques, from the very basic to the highly advanced, enabling viewers of any skill level to learn more about the craft. Tommy was often joined by regular helpers and occasionally episodes featured other woodworking experts. Several episodes with the title "Master Showcase" focused on a notable woodworker and their body of work. More recent episodes have featured Tommy traveling across the United States to collaborate with new experts, and learn more about the history of the craft.

Following seven seasons, it was announced that WGBH had partnered with Fine Woodworking to bring an eighth season to television, now known as Rough Cut with Fine Woodworking. MacDonald's contract had not been renewed after season seven, and Tom McLaughlin was named as the new host of the show.

In 2019, Fine Woodworking removed all references to Rough Cut from their website and rebranded the show to Classic Woodworking. The first season of Classic Woodworking is made up of rebroadcast episodes of season eight of Rough Cut, with newly recorded introductions by McLaughlin.

== Broadcast ==
The series is broadcast on public television stations (mostly PBS stations), and the Create network.

== DVD and media ==
The first and second season were released on DVD. Season eight episodes are available for streaming on Fine Woodworking's website.

== Lawsuit ==
Following the launch of season eight, MacDonald filed a lawsuit against WGBH for trademark infringement, claiming that the company was profiting on his image by relaunching the show with a similar name and different host. MacDonald's attorney argued that while WGBH was allowed to register a trademark for the former title of the show ("Rough Cut: Woodworking with Tommy Mac"), trademarks should not have been allowed for "Rough Cut" or "Tommy Mac." (Prior to the WGBH show, MacDonald's video podcast had been titled "The Rough Cut Show.") WGBH responded that in no way had they suggested that MacDonald was involved in the new production, and that it was clear through their original agreement with MacDonald that WGBH owns the series title and all other trademarks relating to the series. WGBH proceeded to file a counterclaim against MacDonald, stating that they had spent more than $4 million on the series and the trademarks and that MacDonald's rights only covered his name and nicknames. In 2019, it was reported that the legal dispute had been dropped, with both sides declining to discuss specifics of the settlement.
