= Tom McDonald (soccer) =

American soccer player

Personal information
- Date of birth: 1959 (age 66–67)
- Place of birth: Philadelphia, Pennsylvania, U.S.
- Position: Defender

Youth career
- 1977–1981: Philadelphia Textile

Senior career*
| Years | Team | Apps | (Gls) |
| 1982 | Fort Lauderdale Strikers | 0 | (0) |
| 1982–1983 | Pittsburgh Spirit (indoor) | 10 | (0) |
- * Club domestic league appearances and goals

Tom McDonald (born 1959) is an American retired soccer defender who played in the North American Soccer League and Major Indoor Soccer League.

McDonald, younger brother of Ken McDonald, graduated from William Tennent High School where he was a 1977 All State soccer player. He then attended Philadelphia Textile where he was a 1980 Second Team and 1981 First Team All American soccer player. In January 1982, the Fort Lauderdale Strikers selected McDonald in the first round (tenth overall) of the North American Soccer League draft. The Strikers released him in March 1982. He played the 1982-1983 Major Indoor Soccer League season with the Pittsburgh Spirit.
