= Tom McDonald (winemaker) =

New Zealand winemaker

Tom McDonald OBE
- Born: Thomas Bayne McDonald; 12 September 1907; Greenmeadows, New Zealand
- Died: 26 March 1987 (aged 79); Napier, New Zealand
- Occupation: Winemaker

Thomas Bayne McDonald OBE (12 September 1907 – 26 March 1987) was a pioneering New Zealand winemaker. He was born at Greenmeadows, New Zealand, on 12 September 1907. In the 1974 New Year Honours, McDonald was appointed an Officer of the Order of the British Empire, for services to winemaking.

McDonald's name lives on through Montana Wines' flagship red wine Tom, and through the McDonald Cellar at the Church Road Winery.
