= Tom McDonald (politician) =

American politician

Member of the Missouri House of Representatives from the 28th district
- Incumbent
- Assumed office 2009

Personal details
- Born: September 17, 1946 (age 79) Omaha, Nebraska
- Party: Democratic
- Profession: Retail Environment and Industrial Designer, partner in an advertising firm

Tom McDonald (born September 17, 1946) is an American politician. He was a member of the Missouri House of Representatives, having served from 2009 to 2016. He is a member of the Democratic party.
