= Tommy Mac (carpenter) =

American carpenter and woodworker

Tommy MacDonald
- Born: Thomas J. MacDonald; June 18, 1966 (age 59); Dorchester, Boston, Massachusetts
- Education: North Bennet Street School; Blue Hills Regional Technical School
- Occupations: Television host Woodworker
- Known for: Rough Cut - Woodworking with Tommy Mac
- Spouse: Rachel R. MacDonald
- Website: www.thomasjmacdonald.com

Thomas J. MacDonald (born June 18, 1966), known as Tommy Mac, is an American carpenter and woodworker and former host of the public television series Rough Cut: Woodworking with Tommy Mac.

Born in Dorchester, Massachusetts, MacDonald attended the Blue Hills Regional Vocational High School, but dropped out and did not complete his schooling; he later received a GED. He worked as a carpenter for 17 years, but was injured while doing construction work on the Big Dig project in Boston. He later attended the North Bennet Street School in Boston, where he learned woodworking. He started his own business in Canton, Massachusetts, and his work was noticed by Bob Vila, who later invited him to appear on his television series Home Again and on video podcasts for the BobVila.com website. In 2010, MacDonald was signed by WGBH-TV to host his own woodworking instructional program.

After seven seasons, MacDonald's contract with WGBH was not renewed and he had assumed that Rough Cut would end, but WGBH eventually announced a new season of the show with a new host and a similar title. In response, MacDonald filed a lawsuit against WGBH for trademark infringement, citing that advertisements for the new show had used his name, image and trademarks without permission. The lawsuit was eventually dropped with both sides declining to discuss the specifics of the settlement.

In 2019, McDonald began hosting the documentary series "Murder Matters".
