= Kevin Belton =

American chef, television presenter, author and educator

- Born: 1960 (age 65–66); New Orleans, Louisiana, U.S.
- Education: Louisiana State University
- Occupations: Chef; Television presenter Author; Educator
- Culinary career
- Cooking style: Cuisine of New Orleans
- Television shows: New Orleans Cooking with Kevin Belton; Kevin Belton’s New Orleans Kitchen; Kevin Belton's New Orleans Celebrations; Kevin Belton’s Cookin' Louisiana
- Award(s) won: "Uniquely Louisiana Award", Louisiana Association of Broadcasters, 2019
- Website: kevinbelton.com

Kevin Belton (born circa 1960) is an American chef, television presenter, author and educator. Belton specializes in the cuisine of New Orleans. He is the chef-host for New Orleans Cooking with Kevin Belton, Kevin Belton's New Orleans Kitchen, Kevin Belton's New Orleans Celebrations, and Kevin Belton’s Cookin' Louisiana on PBS and serves as the resident morning chef for WWL-TV. He also teaches cooking classes in New Orleans. Belton is also a former professional American football player.

== Biography ==
Belton was born in New Orleans, Louisiana around 1960. He is of African, Native American, French, and English heritage. His mother was a school teacher whose family lived in Martinique. His father's family is from Bordeaux, France.

Belton grew up in the Uptown neighborhood. He attended Our Lady of Lourdes Elementary, Brother Martin High School, and Louisiana State University.

Belton played college football at Louisiana State University and Xavier before injuries ended his career at San Diego Chargers training camp.

Belton's first experiences cooking was when he was a child, around age six, helping his mother and grandmother in the kitchen. The first thing he learned to cook was scrambled eggs. It is from his mother and grandmother that he learned how to cook cajun and Creole. Using his background he became a self-taught chef.

== Career ==
Belton started managing the store at the New Orleans School of Cooking. Eventually, he started teaching classes. He has taught at the school for over 20 years.

Prior to becoming a television chef, Belton regularly watched cooking television shows, including shows by Julia Child, Paul Prudhomme and Justin Wilson. In 1992, he participated in the local PBS affiliates pledge drive, reading listings from an auction board live on air. He started hosting pledge breaks, eventually hosting a Saturday morning cooking show.

In 2016, Belton's show New Orleans Cooking with Kevin Belton launched on WYES-TV.

Belton's second national television program, Kevin Belton’s New Orleans Kitchen, launched in 2018. The PBS series showcases recipes including those created by his mother and grandmother, local traditional dishes, and dishes that represent the melting pot culture of the New Orleans area, including those that meld Greek, South American and Vietnamese.

In 2019, Belton was awarded the "Best Social Media" award by the Louisiana Association of Broadcasters. The Association also awarded his PBS show Kevin Belton’s New Orleans Kitchen the "Uniquely Louisiana Award". In April 2019, his show Kevin Belton's New Orleans Celebrations debuted on PBS and an accompanying cookbook was published.

Belton currently serves as the Morning News Chef for WWL-TV, also presenting television features for the station about local food culture. As of 2021, Kevin hosts "Cookin' Louisiana" on WYES, a Louisiana public television station.

=== Style ===
Belton specializes in the cuisine of New Orleans. His recipes are intentionally simple, with the goal of making cooking non-intimidating for people interested in learning how to prepare New Orleans-style dishes. He does not use a food stylist for his cookbooks or television show, presenting each dish as it would be if the average home cook would prepare it.

== Personal life ==
Belton lives in New Orleans and is married to Monica Belton. He rarely cooks at home. Some of his favorite places for take out in New Orleans are Royal China, Venezia and Central Grocery. He is an avid reader, especially mystery novels.

=== Weight Loss ===
Kevin Belton used to be overweight, and he was also pre-diabetic and had rising blood pressure. These complications informed his weight loss journey, and he eventually lost over 130 pounds in two years.

The chef said he exercised every day with his wife and puppy Cookie Monster in a tweet. He also ate a low-carb diet. Kevin Belton also ate small meal portions.

== Works by Kevin Belton ==
- with Rhonda Findley. Kevin Belton’s Big Flavors of New Orleans. Layton: Gibbs Smith (2016). ISBN 1423641574
- with Rhonda Findley. Kevin Belton's New Orleans Kitchen. Layton: Gibbs Smith (2018). ISBN 1423648943
- with Rhonda Findley. Kevin Belton's New Orleans Celebrations. Layton: Gibbs Smith (2019). ISBN 1423651553
- with Monica Belton. Kevin Belton's Cookin' Louisiana. Layton: Gibbs Smith (2021). ISBN 1423658388
