= Fit 2 Stitch =

- Starring: Peggy Sagers
- Country of origin: United States
- Original language: English

Production
- Running time: 30 minutes
- Production company: National Educational Telecommunications Association

Original release
- Network: PBS
- Release: 2014 – present

Fit 2 Stitch is an American television show hosted by Peggy Sagers airing on Create TV, part of the Public Broadcasting Service, and distributed by American Public Television. The series also airs reruns on World Harvest Television.
