= Fons & Porter's Love of Quilting =

American magazine and TV show

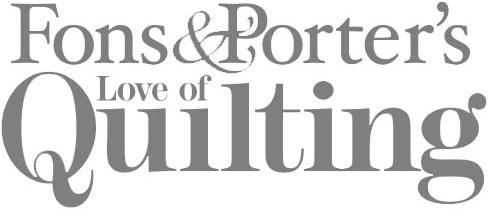
- Categories: Crafts
- Frequency: Bimonthly
- Founder: Liz Porter and Marianne Fons
- Founded: 1999
- Company: Peak Media Properties
- Country: United States
- Based in: Winterset, Iowa
- Language: English
- Website: www.fonsandporter.com
- ISSN: 1525-1284

Fons & Porter's Love of Quilting is a magazine and television program focusing on the art and technique of piecing and quilting quilts. The show was hosted by Liz Porter (Katie Porter’s mother) and Marianne Fons. Both have retired and occasionally make guest appearances on the show. Porter left first and Mary Fons, Marianne's daughter, began to co-host the show with her mother. Gradually, Mary began to host alone with a guest to show a new technique as often as with Marianne. As of 2016, Marianne and Mary do the tips segment, but most shows include either Mary with a guest or David Lose with a guest. The magazine Love of Quilting was first published in 1999 and has been on TV since 2003. Each episode consists of a technique lesson, usually focusing on a single block for a finished quilt, and a tips section of viewer-submitted tips.

In 2006, Fons & Porter was acquired by New Track Media, a company backed by the private equity firm Boston Ventures. In 2014, New Track was sold to F+W Media. F+W filed for bankruptcy in 2019; Love of Quilting was sold to Peak Media Properties.
