= Healthful Indian Flavors with Alamelu =

- Genre: Cooking show
- Created by: Alamelu Vairavan
- Directed by: Jack Abrams
- Presented by: Alamelu Vairavan
- Country of origin: United States
- Original language: English
- No. of seasons: 2
- No. of episodes: 19

Production
- Executive producer: Raul Galvan
- Producer: Jack Abrams
- Editor: Jeff Moorbeck
- Running time: 28 minutes per episode
- Production company: Milwaukee Public Television

Original release
- Release: May 15, 2010 – April 6, 2012

Healthful Indian Flavors with Alamelu is an Indian cooking television program produced by Milwaukee Public Television in the United States. It is hosted by Alamelu Vairavan, with occasional dietetic and nutritional commentary by Margaret Pfeiffer, a registered dietitian and expert in preventive cardiology. It was first broadcast on PBS in May 2010.

Vairavan was born and raised in the town of Kandanur in the Chettinad region of Tamil Nadu in South India. She married K. Vairavan and moved to the United States at the age of 18 in 1967, and learned how to cook from her aunt and uncle's professional Chettinad chef, Nedungudi Natesan, in New York. She earned a degree in Health Information Management at the University of Wisconsin-Milwaukee in 1983. She has two children, a son Ashok and a daughter Valli. Vairavan works to promote healthy cooking and eating to the American public. Her show can be seen currently on the PBS (Public Broadcasting Service) channel Create TV.

== List of episodes ==
Click on episode number links to watch them.

=== Season 1 ===
Episode	Broadcast Date	Dishes
01 on YouTube	15 May 2010	• Lemon Rice with Peanuts • Eggplant Masala • Lima Beans Poriyal
02 on YouTube	22 May 2010	• Bell Pepper and Tomato Rice with Cashews • Garlic and Pepper Chicken • Cucumber and Tomato Yogurt Salad
03 on YouTube	29 May 2010	• Black Eyed Peas Kulambu • Green Beans Poriyal • Cauliflower Masala
04 on YouTube	6 June 2010	• Turkey Podimas • Brussels Sprouts Kulambu • Seasoned Roasted Potatoes
05 on YouTube	13 June 2010	• Carrot Sambhar • Chickpea Mango Soondal • Tuna Masala
06 on YouTube	19 June 2010	• Cauliflower Rice • Chettinad Chicken Masala • Spinach Kootu

=== Season 2 ===
Episode	Broadcast Date	Dishes
01 on YouTube	7 January 2012	• Spice-Rubbed Seared Salmon • Lemon Rice • Butternut Squash Masala
02 on YouTube	14 January 2012	• Cream of Wheat Uppuma • Adai (lentils and rice pancake) • Onion and Potato Kose • Peanut Chutney
03 on YouTube	21 January 2012	• Kohlrabi Sambhar • Lima Beans Poriyal • Tuna Masala
04 on YouTube	28 January 2012	• Garlic and Pepper Chicken • Onion and Tomato Salad • Cabbage with Ginger and Coconut Poriyal
05 on YouTube	4 February 2012	• Carrot and Peas Pilaf Rice with Walnuts • Chicken Kurma • Brussels Sprouts and Chickpea Poriyal
06 on YouTube	11 February 2012	• Lamb Saag • Mushroom and Onion Fry • Seasoned Sweet Potatoes
07 on YouTube	18 February 2012	• Black Pepper and Cumin Rice with Cashews • Shrimp Masala • Green Beans with Coconut Poriyal
08 on YouTube	25 February 2012	• Bell Pepper and Radish Sambhar • Curried Eggplant • Zucchini Poriyal with Coconut • Carrot Raita
09 on YouTube	9 March 2012	• Egg Kulambu • Cauliflower Kootu • Broccoli with Coconut Poriyal
10 on YouTube	16 March 2012	• Shrimp in Eggplant Sauce • Potato Masala • Seasoned Fresh Spinach in Yogurt (Spinach Raita)
11 on YouTube	23 March 2012	• Spinach Poriyal • Chicken Curry in a Hurry • Beets with Coconut Poriyal
12 on YouTube	30 March 2012	• Fish Kulambu • Asparagus Poriyal • Cauliflower with Potatoes and Peas • Yogurt Rice
13 on YouTube	6 April 2012	• Blackeye Peas with Mango Kulambu • Swiss Chard with Lentil and Coconut • Cracked Wheat Uppuma • Madras Coffee
