= Tommy McDonald (footballer, born 1930) =

Scottish footballer

Personal information
- Full name: Thomas McDonald
- Date of birth: 24 May 1930
- Place of birth: Cowdenbeath, Scotland
- Date of death: 24 August 2004 (aged 74)
- Place of death: Dunfermline, Scotland
- Position: Right wing

Youth career
- Hill of Beath Hawthorn

Senior career*
Years	Team	Apps	(Gls)
1949–1954	Hibernian	15	(6)
1954–1956	Wolverhampton Wanderers	5	(1)
1956–1960	Leicester City	113	(27)
1960–1962	Dunfermline Athletic	85	(23)
1962–1963	Raith Rovers	14	(1)
1963	Queen of the South	2	(0)
1963–1964	Stirling Albion	7	(1)
1964	Cowdenbeath	4	(0)

International career
1954	Scotland B	1	(0)
- * Club domestic league appearances and goals

Thomas McDonald (24 May 1930 – 24 August 2004) was a Scottish footballer who played as a right winger. He made over 200 appearances for a number of different clubs in both the Scottish and English leagues.

== Career ==
McDonald's first professional club were Hibernian, where he made his first senior appearances. In April 1954 he moved to English First Division champions Wolverhampton Wanderers. He struggled to gain first team action at Molineux though, and made just six appearances in total for the club before moving to Leicester City for £6,000 in July 1956.

He made the most appearances of his playing career for Leicester, playing over 100 league games during a four-year stay, and helping them to promotion to the top flight under Dave Halliday.

He returned to his native Scotland in July 1960 when he became Jock Stein's first purchase for Dunfermline Athletic at a cost of £3,000. He missed out on their 1961 Scottish Cup triumph when he suffered appendicitis on the eve of the game.

His playing career wound down with a succession of clubs in quick succession, as he served Raith Rovers, Queen of the South, Stirling Albion and Cowdenbeath, respectively. He retired from playing in 1964 to become the manager of the Fife-based non-league side Oakley United.
