= P. Allen Smith =

American TV host, designer, and gardening expert

- Born: March 12, 1960 (age 66); Little Rock, Arkansas, U.S.
- Education: Hendrix College
- Television: P. Allen Smith's Garden Home, P. Allen Smith's Garden to Table, P. Allen Smith's Garden Style, P. Allen Smith's A Sense of Place

Paul Allen Smith, Jr. (born March 12, 1960) is an American garden designer, author, television host, entrepreneur, and conservationist.

Smith is one of America's most recognized garden and design experts, providing ideas and guidance through multiple media venues.

He has hosted four television series since 1989, most recently P. Allen Smith's A Sense of Place, scheduled to begin airing on public television in October 2026.

He is the author of seven books, including the Garden Home series published by Clarkson Potter/Random House and, most recently, Moss Mountain Farm: A Sense of Place (2026).

== Life and work ==
Paul Allen Smith Jr., known professionally as P. Allen Smith, is recognized as one of the country's leading authorities on horticulture and garden design. Born in Little Rock, Arkansas, and raised in McMinnville, Tennessee, he is a fourth-generation nurseryman whose family background in southern horticulture shaped his early training. He earned a B.A. in Biology and History from Hendrix College in 1983, then received a Rotary International Scholarship to study garden design and history at the University of Manchester, where he retraced, 200 years to the day, the tour of English country estates taken by Thomas Jefferson and John Adams — an experience that established the design vocabulary underlying his later American commissions.

Returning to Arkansas, Smith entered the family nursery and garden-design business before founding P. Allen Smith & Associates, a Little Rock, AR landscape and garden design-construction firm. His design philosophy, rooted in the classical English tradition of Palladio, Brown, and Repton has made him one of the most sought-after landscape designers in the country.

Smith has also built his national media profile as host and producer of P. Allen Smith's Garden Home, distributed by American Public Television and among PBS's most successful and longest-running lifestyle programs, along with P. Allen Smith's Garden to Table and the syndicated Garden Style. He was a recurring garden and design contributor on NBC's Today Show and Good Morning America, his work has been frequently published in addition to his television work.

The centerpiece of Smith's public profile is Moss Mountain Farm, his 550-acre estate on the Arkansas River near Little Rock, cited as a contemporary example of the Ferme Ornée tradition. The property functions as both a working design laboratory and destination. In 2020, Smith expanded his enterprise into green manufacturing with the acquisition of Extreme Panel Technologies, a structurally insulated panel (SIP) company, extending his design influence into sustainable, energy-efficient construction.

Smith's institutional affiliations reflect standing at the top tier of American horticulture and preservation. He is a Trustee of Winterthur, a former Board Member of the Royal Oak Foundation (the U.S. partner of Britain's National Trust), a Certified Fellow of the Royal Horticultural Society, and an Honorary Member of the Garden Club of America, which awarded him its Medal of Honor in 2006. He also serves as Honorary President of the Herb Society of America and is a life member of the Livestock Conservancy, the Rare Breeds Trust (UK), and the Society for the Preservation of Poultry Antiquities.

In 2009, Smith founded the Heritage Poultry Conservancy, an organization dedicated to preserving threatened breeds of domestic poultry, reflecting a broader conservation commitment that runs alongside his design work — including supporting preservation programs at Monticello and Mount Vernon. He is also a TEDx speaker and a frequent presenter at many of the country's most prominent historic homes and garden institutions.

== Television ==
Smith began appearing on television in 1989, hosting a weekly gardening segment on Little Rock station KATV's Daybreak program. In 2000, he launched his first nationally syndicated program, P. Allen Smith's Gardens, largely filmed at his historic home in Little Rock's Quapaw Quarter. That program evolved into P. Allen Smith's Garden Style, a 30-minute show internationally distributed by The Television Syndication Company.

Smith's P. Allen Smith's Garden Home series on garden design and outdoor living shares lifestyle trends and stories of people who are making a positive impact in their communities. Some episodes are filmed at Smith's Arkansas Home, Moss Mountain Farm, near Little Rock, Arkansas.

P. Allen Smith's Garden to Table, pairs seasonal growing with cooking. Smith's fourth program, P. Allen Smith's A Sense of Place, is scheduled to begin airing on public television stations in October 2026. Filmed at Smith's Moss Mountain Farm in Arkansas, the series covers regional gardening traditions, seasonal planting, heirloom vegetable varieties, pollinators, and seed saving.

Beyond his own productions, Smith has appeared as a national television contributor on The Weather Channel, the CBS Early Show, NBC's Today Show, Fox and Friends, and Good Morning America, sharing gardening and design techniques with viewers. Smith also shares popular episodes from his shows on YouTube.

== Publications ==
=== Books ===
Smith has authored seven books.

- P. Allen Smith's Garden Home: Creating a Garden for Everyday Living (2003) introduces the twelve principles of design Smith developed at his original Garden Home property in Little Rock.
- P. Allen Smith's Container Gardens: 60 Container Recipes to Accent Your Garden (2005) presents container planting designs in a recipe-style format with ingredient lists and step-by-step instructions.
- P. Allen Smith's Colors for the Garden: Creating Compelling Color Themes (2006) applies color theory to garden design and plant selection.
- P. Allen Smith's Living in the Garden Home: Connecting the Seasons with Containers, Crafts, and Celebrations (2007) connects seasonal living to container gardening, crafts, and entertaining.
- P. Allen Smith's Bringing the Garden Indoors: Containers, Crafts, and Bouquets for Every Room (2009) offers 65 projects for using garden elements to decorate the home.
- P. Allen Smith's Seasonal Recipes from the Garden (2010) is a cookbook inspired by the produce grown on his farm and drawn from a family history of cooks.
- Moss Mountain Farm: A Sense of Place (2026) is a coffee-table volume on the design, inspiration, and purpose behind Smith's Arkansas farm.

=== Other publications ===
In addition to his books, Smith produced a series of smaller instructional card-deck-and-DVD sets through Hortus, each pairing a set of how-to reference cards with a companion instructional video.

- P. Allen Smith's Bulb Garden: Colorful Blooms & Lush Foliage (2010)
- P. Allen Smith's Rose Garden: Roses for Every Garden (2010)
- P. Allen Smith's Veggies & Herbs: From Garden to Table (2010)

== Personal homes and gardens ==
=== The Original Garden Home ===
Located in the historic Quapaw Quarter of Little Rock, Arkansas, the original Garden Home is a 1904 Colonial Revival cottage surrounded by a series of garden rooms designed by Smith. He purchased the house for one United States dollar and relocated it to a 15,000-square-foot (1,400 m^{2}) vacant lot. The bargain price was contingent on Allen receiving permission from the local historical commission to move the home from its original site and restore it elsewhere in the city. This garden was created to illustrate his 12 principles of design, and is the basis of his first book in the Garden Home series. It was also the site of his early television production.

=== Moss Mountain Farm ===
Smith also built Moss Mountain Farm, also known as the Garden Home Retreat, which is located on the banks of the Arkansas River. It encompasses more than 550 acres of land dating back to 1840. The centerpiece is the main house, built in the American Greek Revival style and constructed in an eco-friendly manner. Located directly behind the main house, the croquet lawn is anchored by a matching summer kitchen and art studio. These two symmetrical outbuildings frame views of the river and fountain garden for guests in the home's outdoor living and dining spaces. The surrounding garden includes an elevated border garden and a sunken parterre garden—both of which are separated into east and west wings with framed views of the Arkansas River Valley. These gardens are filled with a mix of annuals, herbs, perennials, roses, shrubs and ornamental grasses. Beyond the flower gardens are orchards filled with heritage apple trees, stone fruit and blueberries, a one-acre vegetable garden, a bluebird trail, wildflower fields and a daffodil hill, which overflows with more than 1,000,000 daffodils blooming each spring.

Various additional buildings orbit the main house and include the Grange Hall, a dining and gathering space, and poultry exhibition buildings. Also on the property is an eco-friendly cottage known variously as the Google Cottage, the eHow Cottage, and the Southern Living Cottage. Smith designed the structure in coordination with Google and YouTube, and it was featured in original programming for eHow Home, a YouTube channel produced by Demand Media and filmed at Moss Mountain Farm as part of YouTube's 2012 original-content initiative. It is now part of the Southern Living design collection. The newest addition to the farm is the Extreme Panel Technologies SIPs Twin Sister Gatehouse Cottages, a separate pair of structures built using structural insulated panel construction.

The property has drawn coverage in national and lifestyle media. In 2010, The New York Times profiled Smith and Moss Mountain Farm in a piece titled "The Martha Stewart of the South." Flower Magazine has also published a tour of the farm's gardens and grounds. Smith’s later television programs were largely filmed on-site. His cookbook was photographed at the Farm, Moss Mountain Farm: A Sense of Place showcases the property through images and text, and the forthcoming PBS series of the same name is also filmed and set there.

== Awards and honors ==
- Member of the Most Venerable Order of the Hospital of Saint John of Jerusalem
- Medal of Honor, Garden Club of America (2006), the organization's oldest national award, for outstanding service to horticulture
- Honorary Member, Garden Club of America (since 2007)
- Arkansas Cultural Enrichment Award, Hot Springs Documentary Film Festival (2009)
- 4-H Celebration of Excellence Award, National 4-H Council (2011)
- Garden Communicator Award, American Nursery and Landscape Association
- Horticultural Communicator Award, American Horticultural Society
- Odyssey Award, Hendrix College Board of Trustees
- Inducted into the Taste Hall of Fame (2015), for his impact in the world of taste and broadcast entertainment
- Mid-America Regional Emmy Award for Lifestyle Program, for A Garden Home Christmas (2020)

Smith's television programs have received numerous additional industry honors. P. Allen Smith's Garden Home won the Taste Award for "Best Green or Organic Program" in 2013, 2014, and 2016, and received four Taste Awards in 2013 alone. Between 2013 and 2020, Smith's programs and branded content — including Garden Home, Garden to Table, and Garden Style — received more than a dozen additional Telly Award and Taste Award honors across categories such as instructional programming, branded video, and general lifestyle content.
