= Create (TV network) =

American digital broadcast TV network

- Type: Digital broadcast television network (DIY and travel programs)
- Country: United States
- Affiliates: Market
- Headquarters: New York City, New York

Programming
- Language: English
- Picture format: 720p (HDTV); 480i (SDTV)

Ownership
- Owner: American Public Television (APT), WGBH, & WNET

History
- Launched: 2004; 22 years ago (select cities); January 9, 2006; 20 years ago (nationwide)
- Replaced: PBS YOU

Links
- Website: createtv.com

Create is an American digital broadcast public television network broadcast on digital subchannels of PBS member stations, along with PBS's app and through Prime Video, where geolocated feeds of PBS member stations (including Create) are available. The network broadcasts how-to, DIY and other lifestyle-oriented instructional programming 24 hours a day.

== History ==
Create launched on WGBH-TV and WLIW in 2004, through both their digital channels and local cable systems. Create was launched nationally on January 9, 2006.

In 2009, APT started looking for a national network underwriter, while seven stations had found local underwriters that covered their network fees. Ten stations at this time were inserting local programming.

With rating data becoming available with more experience handling multicast channels and greater licensing fees, some public TV stations were changing their channel lineup. Some were dropping a network off a channel and programming it independently. A well-known station, WETA-TV, dropped Create on its .2 channel for an independent how-to channel in January 2012. The previous lack of audience data stymied efforts to find a national underwriter. In 2012, APT started planning for more original and exclusive programming. A March national pledge event, a recent new funding source for Create, with travel host Rick Steves, took in at a top 20 market about $40,000. Licensing fees were to be reinstated on July 1, 2012.

== Operations ==
American Public Television (APT), WGBH and WNET operate the network. APT handles affiliate relations, distribution, marketing and underwriting, and producer and viewer relations. A joint team creates the schedule with all working together on strategic and business planning. WNET produces promos and spots for the network and provides master control services.

It is distributed through digital subchannel affiliations with public television stations that are members of or subscribe to APT Exchange, NETA and PBS Plus. Stations' licensing fees fall into one of five price tiers based on budget, market and station size. Shop Create webstore also generates income for the network.

== Shows ==
Create TV broadcasts arts & crafts, food, and travel shows.

LEGEND:
^{APT} - American Public Television
^{NETA} - National Educational Telecommunications Association
^{PBS} - PBS

=== Arts & crafts ===
- Art of a Cowboy^{NETA}
- Beads, Baubles, and Jewels^{NETA}
- Best of Sewing with Nancy^{NETA}
- Best of The Joy of Painting with Bob Ross^{APT}
- Canvasing The World With Sean Diedike^{APT}
- Craft in America^{PBS}
- Craftman's Legacy^{APT}
- Fit 2 Stitch^{APT} ^{NETA}
- Fons & Porter's Love of Quilting^{NETA}
- Fresh Quilting^{NETA}
- Hands On Crafts for Kids^{NETA}
- It's Sew Easy^{NETA}
- Knit and Crochet Now^{APT} ^{NETA}
- Landscapes Through Time with David Dunlop^{NETA}
- Make It Artsy^{NETA}
- Make Your Mark^{APT}
- Paint This with Jerry Yarnell^{NETA}
- Painting and Travel with Roger and Sarah Bansemer^{NETA}
- Painting with Paulson^{NETA}
- Painting with Wilson Bickford^{NETA}
- Pocket Sketching with Kath Macaulay^{NETA}
- Quilting Arts^{NETA}
- Wyland's Art Studio^{APT}

=== Home and garden ===
- Ask This Old House^{PBS}
- Garden Smart^{NETA}
- Gardenfit^{APT}
- Growing a Greener World^{APT}
- This Old House^{PBS}

=== Health and Fitness ===
- Classical Stretch: By Essentrics^{APT}
- Happy Yoga with Sarah Starr^{NETA}
- YNDI Yoga^{APT}
- Yoga in Practice^{APT}

=== Food ===
- 100 Days, Drinks, Dishes and Destinations^{APT}
- America's Test Kitchen^{APT}
- America's Test Kitchen Special: Home for the Holidays^{APT}
- Baking with Julia^{PBS}
- Bringing It Home with Laura McIntosh^{NETA}
- Buen Provecho! Florida's Spanish Flavor^{APT}
- Chef Paul Prudhomme: Louisiana Legend^{APT}
- A Chef's Life^{PBS}
- Christina Cooks^{APT}
- Christina Cooks: Back to the Cutting Board^{APT}
- Christopher Kimball's Milk Street Television^{APT}
- Ciao Italia^{NETA} ^{PBS}
- Confucius Was A Foodie^{APT}
- Cook's Country^{APT}
- Cooking with Nick Stellino^{APT}
- Dining With the Chef^{APT}
- Dishing with Julia Child^{PBS}
- Eating In with Lidia^{PBS}
- Ellie's Real Good Food^{APT}
- Essential Pépin^{APT}
- Family Ingredients^{PBS}
- Farmer and the Foodie^{PBS}
- Field Trip With Curtis Stone^{APT}
- Fit to Eat^{PBS} - hosted by Rob Stinson
- Flavor of Poland^{APT}
- Food Flirts^{PBS}
- French Chef Classics^{APT}
- George Hirsch Lifestyle^{APT}
- The Great American Recipe^{PBS}
- Great American Seafood Cook-Off^{APT}
- Hey Kids, Let's Cook^{NETA}
- A Home for Christy Rost: Thanksgiving^{APT}
- The Hook^{APT}
- Houston Cookbook^{APT}
- How She Rolls^{PBS}
- How to Cook Well at Christmas with Rory O'Connell^{NETA}
- How to Cook Well with Rory O'Connell^{NETA}
- Hubert Keller: Secrets of a Chef^{NETA}
- In Julia's Kitchen with Master Chefs^{PBS}
- Iowa Ingredient^{PBS}
- Jacques Pépin: Heart & Soul^{APT}
- Jamie Oliver Together^{APT}
- Jazzy Vegetarian^{NETA}
- Joanne Weir's Plates and Places^{APT}
- Julia Child - Cooking with Master Chefs^{PBS}
- Julie Taboulie's Lebanese Kitchen^{APT}
- Kevin Belton's Cookin' Louisiana^{APT}
- Kevin Belton's New Orleans Celebrations^{APT}
- Kevin Belton's New Orleans Kitchen^{APT}
- Kitchen Queens: New Orleans^{APT}
- Lidia's Kitchen^{APT}
- Lucky Chow^{APT}
- Maria's Portuguese Table^{NETA}
- Mike Colameco's Real Food^{NETA}
- Modern Pioneering with Georgia Pellegrini^{APT}
- Moveable Feast with Relish^{APT}
- My Greek Table with Diane Kochilas^{APT}
- Neven's Irish Food Trails^{NETA}
- Neven's Spanish Food Trails^{NETA}
- New Day New Chef^{NETA}
- New Orleans Cooking With Kevin Belton^{APT}
- New Scandinavian Cooking^{APT}
- Nick Stellino: Storyteller in the Kitchen^{APT}
- No Passport Required^{PBS}
- P. Allen Smith's Garden Home^{APT}
- Pati's Mexican Table^{APT}
- Primal Grill with Steven Raichlen^{APT}
- Roadfood^{APT}
- Sara's Weeknight Meals^{APT}
- Savor Dakota^{PBS}
- Simply Ming^{APT}
- Somewhere South^{PBS}
- Steven Raichlen's Project Fire^{APT}
- Steven Raichlen's Project Smoke^{APT}
- Taste the Florida Keys with Chef Michelle Bernstein^{APT}
- Taste of Louisiana with Chef John Folse & Co.: Hooks, Lies & Alibis^{APT}
- Taste of Louisiana with Chef John Folse & Co.: Our Food Heritage^{APT}
- Taste of Malaysia with Martin Yan^{APT}
- tasteMAKERS^{APT}
- To Dine for with Kate Sullivan^{APT}
- Trails to Oishii Tokyo^{APT}
- Weekends with Yankee^{APT}
- Welcome to My Farm^{APT}
- Wine First^{APT}
- Yan Can Cook: Spice Kingdom^{APT}

=== Travel ===
- Afro-Latino Travels with Kim Haas^{NETA}
- Art Wolfe's Travels to the Edge^{APT}
- At One with Nature: National Parks of Japan^{APT}
- Bare Feet in NYC with Mickela Mallozzi^{APT}
- Bare Feet with Mickela Mallozzi^{APT}
- Beyond Your Backyard^{NETA}
- Born to Explore with Richard Wiese^{APT}
- Burt Wolf: Travels & Traditions^{APT} ^{NETA}
- Central Florida Roadtrip^{PBS}
- Chesapeake Bay by Air^{APT}
- Christmastime In New Orleans^{APT}
- Crossing South^{NETA}
- Culture Quest^{NETA}
- Curious Traveler^{APT}
- Cycle Around Japan Highlights^{APT}
- Christmas on the Danube^{NETA}
- The Daytripper^{NETA}
- Discover the Upper Cumberland^{PBS}
- Dream of Italy^{APT}
- Dream of Italy: Travel, Transform and Thrive^{APT}
- Dream of Italy: Tuscan Sun Special^{APT}
- European Christmas Markets^{NETA}
- Family Travel with Colleen Kelly^{APT}
- Fly Brother with Ernest White II^{NETA}
- Great Estates of Scotland^{PBS}
- Hometown Georgia^{PBS}
- In The Americas with David Yetman^{APT}
- Ireland: County By County^{PBS}
- Islands Without Cars^{APT}
- Joseph Rosendo's Travelscope^{APT}
- Journeys In Africa^{PBS}
- Journeys in Japan^{APT}
- Let's Go, Minnesota!^{PBS}
- The Magic of Christmas In Alsace^{NETA}
- Mississippi Roads^{PBS}
- Outside: Beyond The Lens^{APT}
- Passion Italy^{APT}
- Real Rail Adventures: Swiss Grand Tour^{APT}
- Real Rail Adventures: Swiss International Hubs^{APT}
- Real Rail Adventures: Swiss Winter Magic^{APT}
- Real Rail Adventures: Switzerland^{APT}
- Richard Bangs' Adventures with Purpose^{APT}
- Richard Bangs' Adventures with Purpose Assam India: Quest for the One-Horned Rhinoceros^{APT}
- Richard Bangs' Adventures with Purpose Basel and Lucerne: Quest for the Crossroad^{APT}
- Richard Bangs' Adventures with Purpose Costa Rica: Quest For Pura Vida^{APT}
- Richard Bangs' Adventures with Purpose Egypt: Quest for the Lord of the Nile^{APT}
- Richard Bangs' Adventures with Purpose Geneva and the Matterhorn: Quest for the Water Castle^{APT}
- Richard Bangs' Adventures with Purpose Greece: Quest for the Gods^{APT}
- Richard Bangs' Adventures with Purpose Hong Kong: Quest for the Dragon^{APT}
- Richard Bangs' Adventures with Purpose Morocco: Quest for the Kasbah^{APT}
- Richard Bangs' Adventures with Purpose New Zealand: Quest for Kaitiakitanga^{APT}
- Richard Bangs' Adventures with Purpose Norway: Quest for the Viking Spirit^{APT}
- Richard Bangs' Adventures with Purpose Pearl River Delta: Hong Kong, Macau and Guangdong: Quest for Harmony^{APT}
- Richard Bangs' Adventures with Purpose Switzerland: Quest for the Sublime^{APT}
- Rick Steves Andalucia: Southern Spain^{APT}
- Rick Steves Best of the Alps^{APT}
- Rick Steves Cruising The Mediterranean^{APT}
- Rick Steves Egypt: Yesterday & Today^{APT}
- Rick Steves European Christmas^{APT}
- Rick Steves European Festivals^{APT}
- Rick Steves Rome^{APT}
- Rick Steves Why We Travel^{APT}
- Rick Steves' Europe^{APT}
- Rick Steves' European Travel Tips and Tricks^{APT}
- Rudy Maxa's World^{APT}
- Rudy Maxa's World: The Taste of Japan^{APT}
- Samantha Brown's Places to Love^{APT}
- Seeing Canada^{NETA}
- Seeing the USA^{NETA}
- Slovakia: Treasures in the Heart of Europe^{APT}
- Smart Travels - Pacific Rim with Rudy Maxa^{APT}
- Smart Travels — Europe With Rudy Maxa^{APT}
- St. Patrick's Day Parade 2025: Live from Dublin, Ireland^{PBS}
- Tennessee Crossroads^{PBS}
- The Highpointers with the Bargo Brothers^{NETA}
- Travels With Darley^{NETA}
- Travelscope^{APT}
- Two for the Road^{NETA}
- Wild Nevada^{APT}
- Wild Travels^{NETA}
