= Taste the Islands =

Caribbean cooking television series

Taste the Islands is a Caribbean cooking series distributed by American Public Television. In it, hosts explore traditional and gourmet Caribbean dishes and offer tips on ethnic ingredients and preparation methods.

Season 1 premiered April 4, 2015 on PBS. It was shown on 103 television stations. 1 In June 2015, the series was picked up by Create TV, making it available in over 40 states. It is the first Caribbean cooking series, and the first series produced and hosted by Jamaicans, to air nationwide on US public television.

Season 1 was hosted by Hugh "Chef Irie" Sinclair and Nicole Hylton-Richards. It was executive produced by Calibe Thompson. Celebrity guests included Inner Circle, Maxi Priest, Kevin Lyttle and Ato Boldon.

== Externals ==
- Taste the Islands with Chef Irie at IMDb
