= Robert Guy Scully =

Robert Guy Scully (born 1950) is a Canadian television producer, interviewer and host, as well as a former journalist. He started as a TV broadcaster with the French-language network Radio-Canada (SRC) and subsequently with the English-language network Canadian Broadcasting Corporation (CBC). He has hosted shows such as Bibliotheca, Scully RDI, Venture, Scully rencontre, Impacts and The Innovators. He also produced the series of short film vignettes known as Heritage Minutes. He currently hosts an independent talk program distributed by American Public Television (APT).

== Origins in journalism ==
Scully was born in Ottawa, Canada, in 1950 and is of Irish and French ancestry. Scully grew up in the working-class district of Hochelaga-Maisonneuve in Montreal and was educated at McGill University.

Encouraged by Claude Ryan to pursue journalism at the age of 19, Scully learned the ropes of journalism at Le Devoir, first as Latin American correspondent, notably landing an interview with Salvador Allende. At the age of 21, he became the literary and arts editor at Le Devoir, the youngest journalist ever to hold that job. In 1975, he moved to the United States and wrote columns from New York and Louisiana for both The Gazette and La Presse.

In 1977, as a print journalist, Scully was accused of harbouring anti-Quebec sentiment in the wake of a caustic article he wrote in the Washington Post that railed against what he viewed as a backward, empty Quebec society. He apologized five days later on the French program Ce Soir for having offended some people with his article, claiming that the article had been written for an American readership, primarily to stir up discussion over the Quebec issue in America. Shortly thereafter, Scully strangely confided to a journalist from La Presse that he was a separatist (or at least, had independentist leanings) as he had actually voted for the Parti Québécois around that time and insisted that his sentiments had been misconstrued. In 1978, he co-wrote a book with the leader of the Quebec Liberal Party, Claude Ryan, about the history of the Quebec independence movement, two years before the first Quebec referendum on sovereignty. In that referendum, Ryan successfully campaigned for the "No" (federalist) forces and won against the independentist forces in Quebec.

== Television in two languages ==
In 1982, Scully was working in radio at Radio-Canada and by 1984, he was hosting the French TV program Impacts. In 1987, Scully took over from Patrick Watson as the host of the new CBC business program Venture. In 1988, the show was honoured with a Gemini Award for Best Information Program or Series. Also in 1988, Scully twice won the Quebec equivalent of the award, the Prix Gémeaux, for his work on Impacts. Venture again won a Gemini Award in 1996 (Academy of Canadian Cinema and Television), for Best News Information Program or Series. In 1997, Dianne Buckner took over as host of the business news and current affairs program, which lasted for another 10 years before it was cut from the CBC-TV lineup. In 1998, Scully was nominated for a Gemeaux Award in the category "Best Host of an Information Series or Special" – for Le monde de Gabrielle Roy (Scully RDI).

Scully is listed as a producer of a TV mini-series, Les Beaux Dimanches - Maurice Richard: Histoire d'un Canadien, a 4-hour compilation of archive footage and dramatic scenes, which was first broadcast in October 1999 (Beautiful Sundays: The Maurice Rocket Richard Story [Canada: English title]). It won the 2000 Prix Gémeaux for Best Biographical Documentary, 6 months after Maurice Richard’s death at the age of 78. It has since been tarnished, however, by association with the anti-corruption inquiry of the Gomery Commission.

=== Departure from CBC and journalism ===
In 2000, Scully quit the CBC after it was discovered that the Canada Information Office had been the major source of funding for one of his programs, Canada du Millénaire, and that the federal government (Department of Canadian Heritage) had channeled funds through a private foundation to support the vignettes called Heritage Minutes. (Note: Quotes from Kevin Michael Grace: "Robert Scully is a perfect exemplar of the New Canadian Man. The 50-year-old broadcaster is an anglophone to the anglophones and (as Robert-Guy Scully) a francophone to the francophones. His downfall proves that the 1960s' dream of a bilingual, bicultural Canada is as far from reality as ever." (extract); "Mr. Scully is known in English Canada as the former host of CBC's Venture. In Quebec, his interviews draw huge audiences. Until last month he was exceptionally busy, hosting two shows on RDI, the French Newsworld, and shows on TV5, the French international channel, and America's PBS. On June 8 he hosted a somewhat unusual program, a live satellite broadcast from Rome where he made the peculiar announcement of his retirement from journalism — but not from broadcasting. 'I return the title to those who wish to take it from me,' Mr. Scully declared." (extract)) Despite his "retirement" from journalism, Scully nonetheless continued his cable television program Scully: The World Show, which first aired on November 5, 1983. Scully is proficient not only in English and French, but also in Spanish and German.

=== Funding of "Maurice Richard" series investigated by Gomery Commission ===
In the February 2004 report that prefaced the Gomery Commission, Auditor General Sheila Fraser said the Sponsorship Program created in 1997 by the Jean Chrétien government was designed to generate commissions for private companies—while hiding the source of the funding—rather than to provide any benefit for Canadians. One of the offenders, Canada Post, was asked why it paid $1,625,000 to a production company, L'Information essentielle Inc. to produce a television series on Maurice Richard, despite the fact that no contract was signed and there was no documentation provided to show how the corporation would benefit. Robert Scully was part owner and the executive producer of L'Information essentielle Inc. In another instance of questionable money transfers, Fraser's audit showed that Via Rail Canada Inc. was used by Lafleur Communication Marketing to handle the transfer of nearly $1 million towards the same television series on Maurice Richard, using what the auditor general called a "fictitious contract." Via was reimbursed all but $160,000 of the money; of that, Lafleur kept $112,500 as an agency commission.

=== Parodies of Scully ===
Comedians have tried to imitate Scully's interviewing style, with some success, both in French and in English. When Paul Martin was Minister of Finance, he once appeared as a guest on Royal Canadian Air Farce, participating in a skit that was a spoof of Venture. Martin threatened to audit Scully (played by Don Ferguson) when he tried to hand-deliver his tax return to save on postage. When the show first appeared weekly on TV, it frequently parodied Scully.
