= National Educational Telecommunications Association =

Syndicator for public TV stations

- Company type: Nonprofit
- Industry: Public television Television syndication
- Predecessor: Southern Educational Communications Association; Pacific Mountain Network
- Founded: 1967; 59 years ago (as Southern Educational Communications Association); 1997; 29 years ago (as National Educational Telecommunications Association)
- Headquarters: Columbia, South Carolina, U.S.
- Area served: Worldwide
- Website: netaonline.org

National Educational Telecommunications Association (NETA) is an American nonprofit organization and syndicator of programming for public television. It was a rival to American Public Television, being a distributor of public television programs for PBS stations nationwide and independent educational networks, and co-owner of the World Channel.

== History ==
The company had its genesis as Southern Educational Communications Association, which was formed in 1967 to produce programming for National Educational Television and later PBS, and became a network syndicator of regional programming next to the Eastern Educational Network. One of SECA's best known programs was Firing Line, which came to the air in 1971.

The Pacific Mountain Network was formed as a rival organization in 1978, distributing programming to the Rocky Mountains. In 1997, most of the assets of SECA and the Pacific Mountain Network (specifically the sixteen licenses) were transferred to NETA, although Pacific Mountain Network was dissolved in 2017. The company later started its program service NETA Program Service, that rivaled both American Public Television and PBS.

In 1999, NETA Business Center was launched by Anita Sims for financial services of its programming. In 2000, NETA begin a systemwide reorganization of its public television content. In 2012, NETA begins partnering with Coca-Cola bottler for station health insurance of its programming.

In 2017, Skip Hinton, a NETA member was retired. In 2018, the company was underwent a severe reorganization, resulting in a realignment of various staff members across the company. In 2019, NETA partnered with the Affinity Group Coalition to launch a collaborative project. In 2025, as Corporation for Public Broadcasting, one of NETA's members was about to shut down, NETA took its members virtually.

== Programming ==
Like its competitor American Public Television, National Educational Telecommunications Association is syndicating its shows to public television, and distributed as many as new titles per year.
