= Robert Scully =

Robert Scully may refer to:

- Robert Walter Scully Jr., whose actions inspired the 2014 film Supremacy
- Robert Guy Scully, a Canadian journalist most noted as a former host of the CBC Television business news program Venture
