= Pati Jinich =

Mexican chef and author (born 1972)

- Pati Jinich at the James Beard Media Awards in New York on April 26, 2019.
- Born: Patricia Drijanski; March 30, 1972 (age 54); Mexico City, Mexico
- Education: Instituto Tecnológico Autónomo de México (B.S., Political Science, 1995); Georgetown University (M.A., Latin-American studies, 2004); L'Academie de Cuisine, Gaithersburg, Maryland (Certificate, Intensive Culinary Skills, 2006)
- Occupations: Chef, TV Personality, Author
- Years active: 2007–present
- Known for: Pati's Mexican Table, public television series (2011-), La Frontera with Pati Jinich, PBS docuseries (2021 - 2023), Pati Jinich Explores Panamericana, PBS docuseries (2025-)
- Spouse: Daniel Jinich (m. 1996)
- Children: 3
- Website: patijinich.com

Patricia Jinich (/ˈhinitʃ/ born Patricia Drijanski, March 30, 1972) is a Mexican chef, TV personality, cookbook author, educator, and food writer. She is best known for her James Beard Award-winning and Emmy-nominated public television series Pati's Mexican Table, her James Beard Award-winning PBS primetime docuseries La Frontera with Pati Jinich, and her James Beard Award-nominated PBS primetime docuseries Pati Jinich Explores Panamericana. Her first cookbook, also titled Pati's Mexican Table, was published in March 2013, her second cookbook, Mexican Today, was published in April 2016, and her third cookbook, Treasures of the Mexican Table, was published in November 2021. Her fourth cookbook, Foods of La Frontera, will be published in September 2026.

Jinich is the resident chef at the Mexican Cultural Institute in Washington, DC, where she has run her "Mexican Table" live culinary program since 2007. She has appeared on The Today Show, Good Morning America, The Talk, CBS This Morning, Live with Kelly and Mark, All Things Considered, Morning Edition, and The Splendid Table among other media. Her food writing has appeared in The Washington Post and The New York Times. In May 2014, Jinich was invited to cook at the White House for President Barack Obama's Cinco de Mayo dinner. In May 2018, she cooked at the James Beard House in New York City for its Cinco de Mayo dinner.

== Early life ==
Jinich was born and raised in Mexico City to a Jewish family. The youngest of four sisters, her grandparents were Jewish refugees from Eastern Europe. The two had originally met in Europe and then reconnected in Mexico. Her father was an architect who turned restaurateur, and her mother ran an art gallery.

Food was always an important part of Jinich's family life growing up. Her three older sisters pursued the culinary arts early on, but Jinich grew up dreaming of a career in academia. She earned a political science bachelor's degree from the Instituto Tecnológico Autónomo de México and a master's degree in Latin-American studies from Georgetown University, and she worked as a political analyst for the Inter-American Dialogue, a Washington, DC think tank before switching careers.

She met her husband, Daniel Jinich, on a blind date. They were married in Mexico City in 1996 when she was 24.

== Culinary career ==
Jinich first began researching and cooking Mexican cuisine out of homesickness for her native Mexico City, when she moved to Dallas, Texas, with her husband. Soon, she was teaching Mexican cooking to friends and neighbors. At the same time, as she was writing her bachelor's thesis, she offered to help KERA, the Dallas public TV station, with a documentary on the Mexican Revolution, but they needed help with another project: the PBS series New Tastes from Texas with Chef Stephan Pyles, for which she became a production assistant.

Two years later, she relocated to Washington, DC, with her husband and their first-born son, where she resumed her academic pursuits, earning her master's degree from Georgetown and landing her "dream job" at the Inter-American Dialogue, but she never stopped obsessively thinking about food and enrolled at L'Academie de Cuisine in Maryland.

Jinich envisioned herself writing articles about Mexican cuisine and teaching it in her home kitchen, until she met with the executive director of the Mexican Cultural Institute in Washington, DC, who encouraged her to bring her cooking program to the institute. In 2007, she launched her "Mexican Table" series of live cooking demonstrations along with multi-course tasting dinners, which she still runs today. The classes combine Jinich's skilled Mexican cooking with her knowledge of the country's history and regions. Each one explores a single topic—for example, dishes of the Mexican Revolution, a historical vanilla menu, or convent foods from colonial Mexico.

Around the same time, she started her blog about Mexican cuisine, which was followed by invitations to write about food for print publications and to give talks and cooking demos for radio and TV shows.

Jinich's charisma and intelligence caught the attention of television producers. After exploring different outlets, she decided public media was the right home for Pati's Mexican Table because of her commitment to authenticity and the independence the PBS and public-TV platform allows over the content of its shows. The first season of Pati’s Mexican Table premiered in 2011.

== Television ==
In Pati's Mexican Table, Jinich shares authentic Mexican cooking, along with Mexico's rich history and culture; her personal experiences and family life; and her ongoing conversations with cooks on both sides of the border. The series airs nationally in the United States on public television stations (distributed by APT) and on Create TV. It also airs on the Asian Food Channel in Southeast Asia, Food Network in Australia, TLN in Canada, and TABI Channel in Japan.

The Pati's Mexican Table series premiered in 2011; it is now on its 15th season. In 2017, Amazon added Pati's Mexican Table to its Amazon Prime Video Internet video on demand service.

In 2021, Jinich made her PBS primetime debut in a docuseries called La Frontera with Pati Jinich, where she travels along both sides of the Mexico–United States border to experience the region's rich culture, people, and cuisine, and reflects on the melding of cultures. Both seasons are available on demand through the PBS website and video app and on Amazon Prime Video.

In 2025, Jinich debuted the first season of her second PBS primetime docuseries, Pati Jinich Explores Panamericana, in which she embarks on a journey inspired by the Pan-American Highway, that will take her from Alaska to Argentina, to celebrate the many cultures of the Americas and how they enrich each other. The first season is available on demand through the PBS website and video app and on Amazon Prime Video. Season 2 will premiere Fall 2026.

== Cookbooks ==
=== Pati's Mexican Table: The Secrets of Real Mexican Home Cooking ===
Jinich's first cookbook, Pati's Mexican Table: The Secrets of Real Mexican Home Cooking, was published by Houghton Mifflin Harcourt in March 2013. The book is based on the traditional Mexican home cooking with which Jinich grew up, with many recipes gleaned from her childhood in Mexico City. It made Amazon's "Best of the Year in Cookbooks" list of 2013, the Washington Post's "Best Cookbooks of 2013" list, The Splendid Table's "Staff Book Picks of 2013" list, and Serious Eats "Our Favorite Cookbooks of 2013" list.

=== Mexican Today: New and Rediscovered Recipes for Contemporary Kitchens ===
Jinich's second cookbook, Mexican Today: New and Rediscovered Recipes for Contemporary Kitchens, was published by Houghton Mifflin Harcourt in April 2016. Jinich explores both traditional and rediscovered Mexican dishes as well as reinterpretations and new takes using Mexican ingredients in this book. NPR's Maria Godoy said, "Mexican Today explores not just traditional fare but [also] the country's evolving cuisine and the many immigrant groups who have influenced it."

=== Treasures of the Mexican Table ===
Jinich's third cookbook, Treasures of the Mexican Table: Classic Recipes, Local Secrets, was published by Houghton Mifflin Harcourt in November 2021. It is Jinich's most extensive cookbook yet, with recipes she has encountered in her travels all around Mexico including everything from world-famous dishes to local specialties unknown outside their regions. It was a New York Times bestseller and was named one of the best cookbooks of 2021 by The New York Times, The Washington Post, The San Francisco Chronicle Glamour magazine, and Epicurious.

=== Foods of La Frontera: Recipes and New Taste Frontiers from Both Sides of the Border ===
Jinich's fourth cookbook, Foods of La Frontera: Recipes and New Taste Frontiers from Both Sides of the Border, will be published by HarperCollins in September 2026. It chronicles her travels along both sides of the U.S.-Mexico border through 125 recipes celebrating the rich cultures and foods from where the two countries meet.

== Personal life ==
Jinich lives in Chevy Chase, Maryland, with her husband Daniel Jinich and their three sons: Alan, Samuel ("Sami"), and Julian ("Juju"). Her sister Karen Drijanski is a chef in Mexico City. Her other sister, Sharon Drijanski, is a designer and has written vegetarian cookbooks. A third sister, Alisa Drijanski, is a pastry chef.

== Awards and accolades ==
- Jinich was the Broadcast Media Hall of Fame honoree at the James Beard Foundation Awards (2026)
- Pati's Mexican Table won a James Beard Foundation Award for Instructional Visual Media (2026)
- Pati Jinich Explores Panamericana nominated for a James Beard Foundation Award for Travel Visual Media (2026)
- Jinich won an IACP Lifetime Achievement Award
- Pati's Mexican Table won an IACP Award for Culinary Video Series (2025)
- Named to The Washington Post's "Post Next: 50 People Shaping Our Society in 2025" List (2025)
- La Frontera with Pati Jinich Season 2 won a James Beard Foundation Award for Docuseries Visual Media (2024)
- Pati's Mexican Table won an IACP Award for Culinary Television Series (2024)
- Treasures of the Mexican Table won an IACP Award for Best International Cookbook (2022)
- Won a Gracie Award for Producer ‐ Documentary /Unscripted / Non‐Fiction for La Frontera with Pati Jinich (2022)
- Pati's Mexican Table won a James Beard Foundation Award for Outstanding Television Program in Studio or Fixed Location (2020)
- Won a Gracie Award for On-Air Talent – Lifestyle for Pati's Mexican Table (2020)
- Pati's Mexican Table won an Imagen Award for Best Reality Program (2020)
- Pati's Mexican Table won an IACP Award for Culinary Television Series (2020)
- Named to Hola! USA's "Latina Powerhouse Top 100" List (2020)
- Nominated for a Realscreen Award for Lifestyle - Studio-based Food Program (2020)
- Pati's Mexican Table won a James Beard Foundation Award for Outstanding Television Program in Studio or Fixed Location (2019)
- Nominated for a Daytime Emmy Award for Outstanding Culinary Host (2019)
- Won a James Beard Foundation Award for Outstanding Personality/Host for Pati's Mexican Table (2018)
- Pati's Mexican Table won an Imagen Award for Best Reality Program (2018)
- Named one of the Top-5 Border Ambassadors between the U.S. and Mexico by Americas Quarterly (2017)
- Nominated for a James Beard Foundation Award for Outstanding Television Program in Studio or Fixed Location (2017)
- Nominated for a Daytime Emmy Award for Outstanding Culinary Host (2016)
- Nominated for a Daytime Emmy Award for Outstanding Culinary Program (2016)
- Nominated for a James Beard Foundation Award for Outstanding Personality/Host (2016)
- Nominated for a James Beard Foundation Award for Outstanding Television Program in Studio or Fixed Location (2016)
- Won an Imagen Award for Best National Informational Program (2016)
- Won two consecutive Taste Awards for Best Ethnic Program (2016, 2015)
- Nominated for an Imagen Award for Best National Informational Program (2014)
- Nominated for an IACP Award for Best Culinary Series (2014)
- The cookbook Pati's Mexican Table was selected for the 2013 Gourmand World Cookbook Awards Best in the World List
- Jinich cooked at the White House for President Barack Obama's Cinco de Mayo Dinner (2014)
- Named to the Smithsonian National Museum of American History's Kitchen Cabinet Board for the American Food History Project (2014)
- Named to the United Nations' Global Alliance for Clean Cookstoves Chefs Corps (2015)

== Organizations ==
- Les Dames d'Escoffier

== Bibliography ==
=== Works of Pati Jinich ===
- Jinich, Pati, The Century-Long Saga of the Caesar Salad", The New York Times, July 1, 2024
- Jinich, Pati, "The Habanero Rules Yucatán. Let It Rule Your Kitchen, Too.", The New York Times, January 5, 2024
- Jinich, Pati, "On the Border, the Perfect Burrito Is a Thin, Foil-Wrapped Treasure", The New York Times, November 27, 2023
- Jinich, Pati, "There’s Nothing Like a Good Concha. Here’s How to Make Them Great.", The New York Times, March 21, 2022
- Jinich, Pati, "Camarones Embarazados, the Grilled Shrimp Recipe That Brings the Beach to You", The New York Times, July 29, 2021
- Jinich, Pati, "The Original Nachos Were Crunchy, Cheesy and Truly Mexican", The New York Times, October 29, 2020
- Jinich, Pati, "For years, I taught my sons to cook. Now, I’m learning from them.", The Washington Post, October 6, 2020
- Jinich, Pati, "Finding the Soul of Sonora in Carne Asada", The New York Times, August 11, 2020
- Jinich, Pati, "Tex-Mex cooking: It's not Mexican, and maybe that's the point", The Washington Post, January 28, 2014

=== Works by other authors ===
- Carman, Tim, "Pati Jinich: Made for TV", The Washington Post, March 29, 2011
- Rochlin, Margy, "Pati Jinich on exploring the food and culture along U.S.-Mexico border: ‘I’ve never felt more at home’", Los Angeles Times, June 21, 2023
- Severson, Kim, "Forget the Wall: Pati Jinich Wants to Build a Culinary Bridge to Mexico", The New York Times, October 9, 2018
- Sussman, Adeena, "Pati Jinich on Mexican-Jewish Mashups", Hadassah Magazine, September 2016
