= Rick Steves =

American travel writer and television host (born 1955)

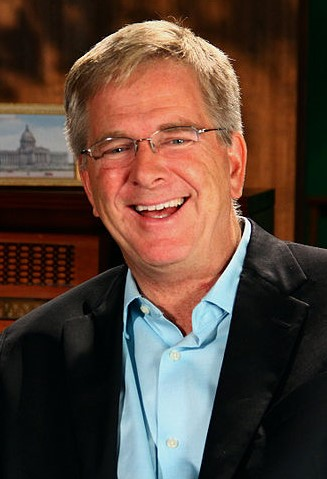
- Steves in 2013
- Born: Richard John Steves Jr. May 10, 1955 (age 71); Barstow, California, U.S.
- Education: University of Washington
- Occupations: Writer; television personality; radio host
- Years active: 1979–present
- Known for: Travel guides
- Political party: Democratic
- Spouse: Anne Steves (m. 1984; div. 2010)
- Children: 2

Richard John Steves Jr. (born May 10, 1955) is an American travel writer, activist, and television personality. His travel philosophy encourages people to explore less-frequented areas of destinations and to become immersed in the local people's way of life. Starting in 2000, he hosted Rick Steves' Europe, a travel series on public television. Steves also has a public radio travel show called Travel with Rick Steves (2005−present) and has authored numerous travel guides, the first of which was the popular Europe Through the Back Door. In 2006, he became a syndicated newspaper columnist, and in 2010, his company released a mobile phone application called "Rick Steves' Audio Europe" containing self-guided walking tours and geographic information.

== Early life and career ==
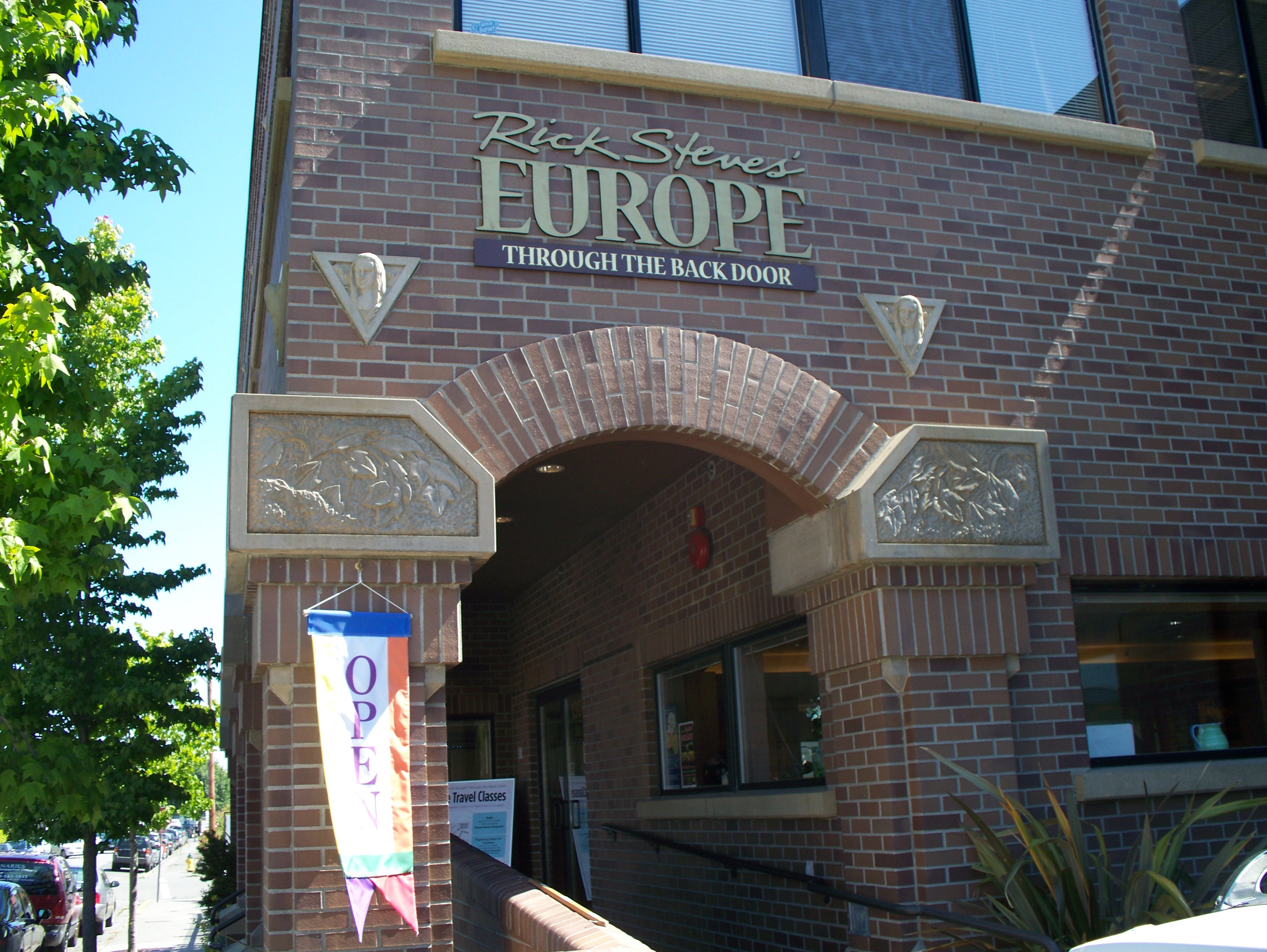
Rick Steves's corporate headquarters in Edmonds, Washington

Richard John Steves Jr. was born in Barstow, California, to parents Richard John Steves Sr., a high school band director, and piano technician June Erna Steves (née Fremmerlid). His mother was born to Norwegian immigrants Harold and Erna Fremmerlid. He has two sisters. The family moved to Edmonds, Washington, in 1967.

When Steves was 14, along with his parents, he took a trip to Europe to see piano manufacturers and their factories. The family owned a piano store named "Steves Sound of Music," where they imported, sold, and tuned pianos. He documented what he saw and experienced while in Europe on the backs of postcards, which he numbered sequentially. He still has the cards stored in a wooden box. The family also visited relatives in Norway during the Apollo 11 Moon landing, and in a park in Oslo, Steves came to a realization that would influence him throughout his life: "This planet must be home to billions of equally lovable children of God." When he turned 18, he again visited Europe, but without his parents. He kept journals of all of those experiences as well.

Steves attended the University of Washington, majoring in European history and business administration, graduating in 1978.

In his twenties, Steves started teaching travel classes through The Experimental College, a student-run program of non-credit classes at his alma mater, and working as a tour guide in the summer. During this period, he also worked as a piano teacher. In 1979, based on his travel classes, he wrote the first edition of Europe Through the Back Door (ETBD), a general guide on how to travel in Europe. Steves self-published the first edition of his travel skills book ETBD in 1980. The book contained a page that said, "Anyone caught reprinting any material herein for any purpose whatsoever will be thanked profusely." Unlike most guidebook entrepreneurs, he opened a storefront business. Initially, his operation was both a travel center and a piano teaching studio. He held travel classes and slide show presentations, did travel consulting, organized a few group tours per year, and updated his books. He did not provide ticket booking or other standard travel agency services. He incorporated his business as "Rick Steves' Europe Through the Back Door." The store was in Steves's hometown of Edmonds, north of Seattle. The company's headquarters is still in Edmonds. Steves's first television show, Travels in Europe with Rick Steves, debuted on public television in April 1991 and ended production in 1998. His second show, Rick Steves' Europe, debuted in September 2000 and has aired episodes through 2023, though because he does not produce a season every year, this accounts for 11 seasons.

Steves is a workaholic. After filming all day in Europe, he sometimes slides script revisions under the crew's doors at two in the morning, then requests feedback on them during breakfast. On long car rides, he will sit in the back seat and type opinion pieces. He maintains hands-on control of all areas of his business.

== Current activities ==
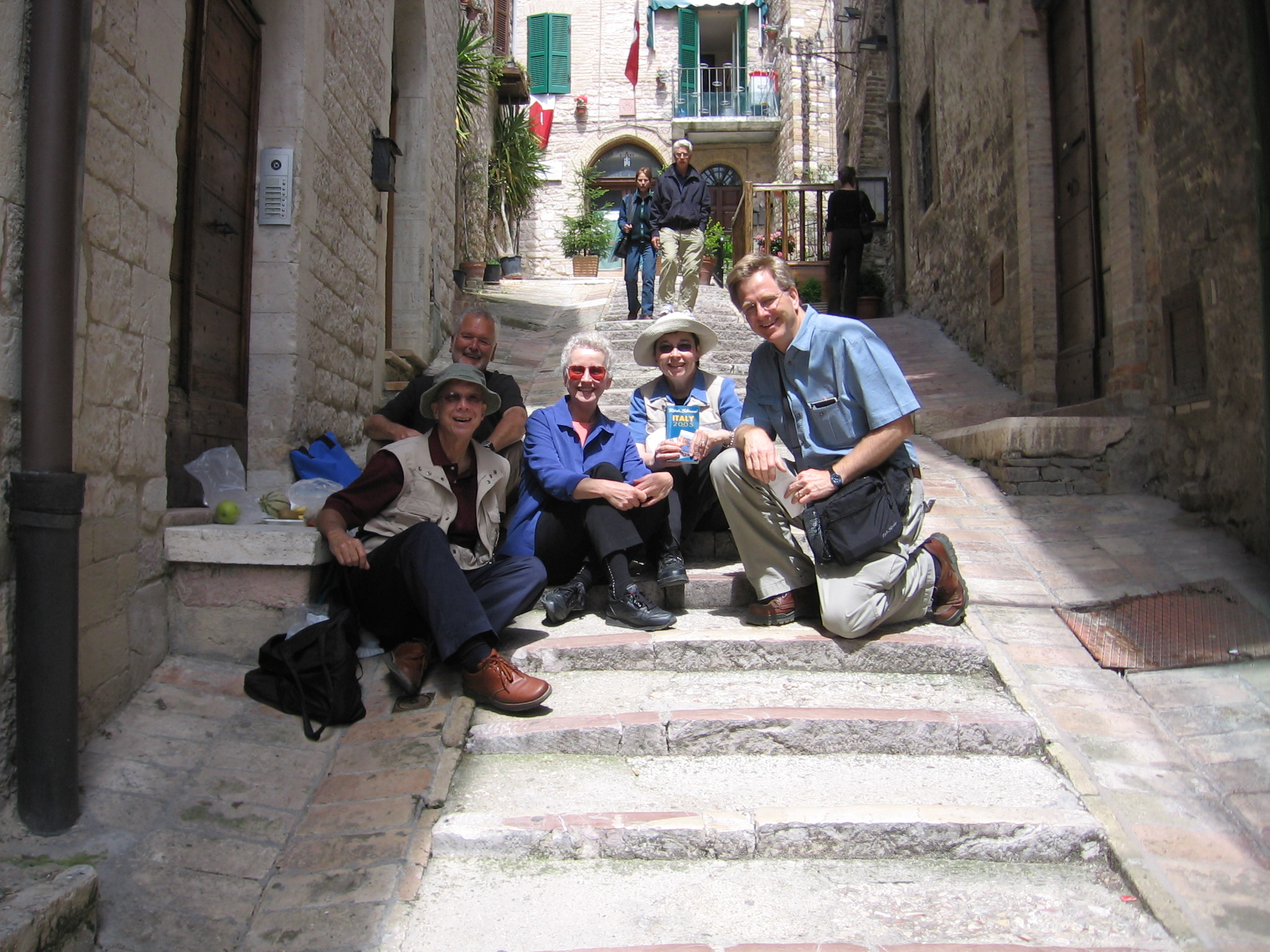
Steves with tourists in Italy

Steves advocates independent travel. His books and media deal with travel mainly in Europe and are directed at a North American audience. As host, writer, and producer of the popular and long-running American Public Television series Rick Steves' Europe, and through his travel books, he encourages Americans to become what he calls "temporary locals." He encourages his readers and viewers to visit not just major cities but also cozy villages away from popular tourist routes. Steves's television series, guidebooks, radio shows, mobile applications, and his company's European escorted bus tours attract fans known as "Rickniks".

Steves's relationship with public television began in 1991 with his first series, Travels in Europe With Rick Steves. Since then he has become one of public television's top pledge drive hosts, raising money annually for stations across the U.S. He writes and co-produces his television programs through his own production company, Back Door Productions.

Since self-publishing his first book in 1980, Steves has written country guidebooks, city and regional guides, and phrasebooks, and he co-authored Europe 101: History and Art for Travelers. His guide to Italy is the best-selling international guidebook in the U.S. In 1999, he started writing in a new genre of travel writing with his anecdotal Postcards from Europe, recounting his favorite moments from his many years of travel. Steves's books are published by Avalon Travel Publishing, a member of the Perseus Books Group. In 2009, Steves published the book Travel as a Political Act, a guide on traveling more thoughtfully.

In addition to his guidebooks and television shows, Steves has expanded into radio, newspapers, and mobile applications. In 2005, Steves launched a weekly public radio program, Travel with Rick Steves. Focusing on world travel, although with a heavy emphasis on Europe and North America, each program has a guest travel expert for interviews, followed by call-ins with questions and comments. In 2006, Steves became a syndicated newspaper columnist with his Tribune Content Agency column. In 2010, he launched the mobile application Rick Steves' Audio Europe, a library of audio content (including self-guided walking tours) organized into geographic-specific playlists for the iPhone and Android.

Steves also purchased the Edmonds Theater, his hometown venue, in 2026.

== Political and civic advocacy ==
Rick Steves speaks about cannabis prohibition at Seattle Hempfest 2010

Politically, Steves has identified himself as a member of the Democratic Party, and publicly endorsed Hillary Clinton, Joe Biden, and Kamala Harris for president in 2016, 2020, and 2024, respectively.

Steves is a vocal proponent of legalizing cannabis and an active supporter of efforts to reform cannabis policy in the U.S. According to Steves: "Like most of Europe, I believe marijuana is a soft drug, like alcohol and tobacco. Like alcohol and tobacco, there is no reason why it shouldn't be taxed and regulated. Crime should only enter the equation if it is abused to the point where innocent people are harmed."

Steves serves on the advisory board of the National Organization for the Reform of Marijuana Laws, becoming its chairman of the board of directors in 2021. He was also a major supporter of Initiative 502 to legalize, tax, and regulate cannabis in the state of Washington. Steves hosted an ACLU-sponsored educational program called Marijuana: It's Time for a Conversation, which was nominated for an Emmy.

Steves also supports solutions to homelessness. In 2005, he constructed a 24-unit apartment complex in Lynnwood, Washington, called Trinity Place and administered by the local YWCA, to provide transitional housing for homeless mothers and their children. In 2017, Steves donated that $4 million apartment complex for homeless women and kids to the YWCA. The Lynnwood Neighborhood Center, a non-profit social services center that opened in January 2026, was built on property that Steves had previously donated to a local church. In 2025, Steves spent $2 million to purchase the Lynnwood Hygiene Center, which served homeless residents in the community, to help save the facility from closing. Members of the Edmonds Noontime Rotary Club help maintain the buildings and grounds, providing everything from furniture to flowers. The club also raised $30,000 to build a play structure for the children there.

Steves also donates royalties from one of his books to the group Bread for the World, a movement to end hunger.

A supporter of the arts, Steves gave US$1 million in 2011 to the Edmonds Center for the Arts and Cascade Symphony Orchestra.

As a lifelong traveler, Steves avows that terrorism is something to which Americans should get accustomed, a natural outgrowth of the United States' position in the global community and how it is militarily advanced. In an excerpt from an interview with Enrique Cerna from KCTS, Steves said:

I think we're 300 million people and if we lose a few hundred people a year to terrorists, that doesn't change who we are and it shouldn't change the fabric of our society. Frankly I think we should get used to losing—as long as we're taking the stance in the world of being the military superpower, you're going to have people nipping at you. And if it's hundreds or thousands—we lose 15,000 people a year to have the right to bear arms and most people think that's a good deal, year after year. We spend 15,000 people for the right to bear arms. What do we spend to be as aggressive and heavy weight on this planet? We're always going to have terrorism.

When he traveled to Iran, he noted the similarity of Iranians and Americans each giving up freedoms to make themselves less fearful:

They traded away their freedom for a theocracy, out of fear. It's just like Americans. We don't want to torture people, we want to have civil liberties, we don't want our government reading our mail. But when we have fear, we let fear trump our commitment to our civil liberties and decency. We allow torture, we allow the government to read our mail. It's not because we're bad, it's because sometimes fear is more important than our core values. And Iran is afraid. They've given up democracy because they know a theocracy will stand strong against encroaching Western values.

In Travel as a Political Act, Steves wrote that displaying the American flag on car antennas "creates a fearful, schizophrenic dynamic that may stoke today's terrorism and tomorrow's international conflicts".

On the day of Donald Trump's inauguration in 2017, Steves matched the sum total of every purchase made on his website that day and donated it to the American Civil Liberties Union. According to Steves, the website had higher traffic than usual after he announced the effort, and customers purchased $42,962 in merchandise. He donated $50,000 to the ACLU and stated, "Those of us with passports and who are wealthy enough to travel a lot—especially white, straight, Christian males like me—don't often think a lot about civil liberties ... at least, not in an immediate or personal way. Civil liberties just aren't an issue for most of us. If a wealthy person is in trouble with the law, he can hire a good lawyer. It's the poor who are filling our prisons. If I want to smoke pot, no one's going to arrest me. It's poor and Black people who get arrested and then disenfranchised. I have a voice because I fit societal norms and I have money."

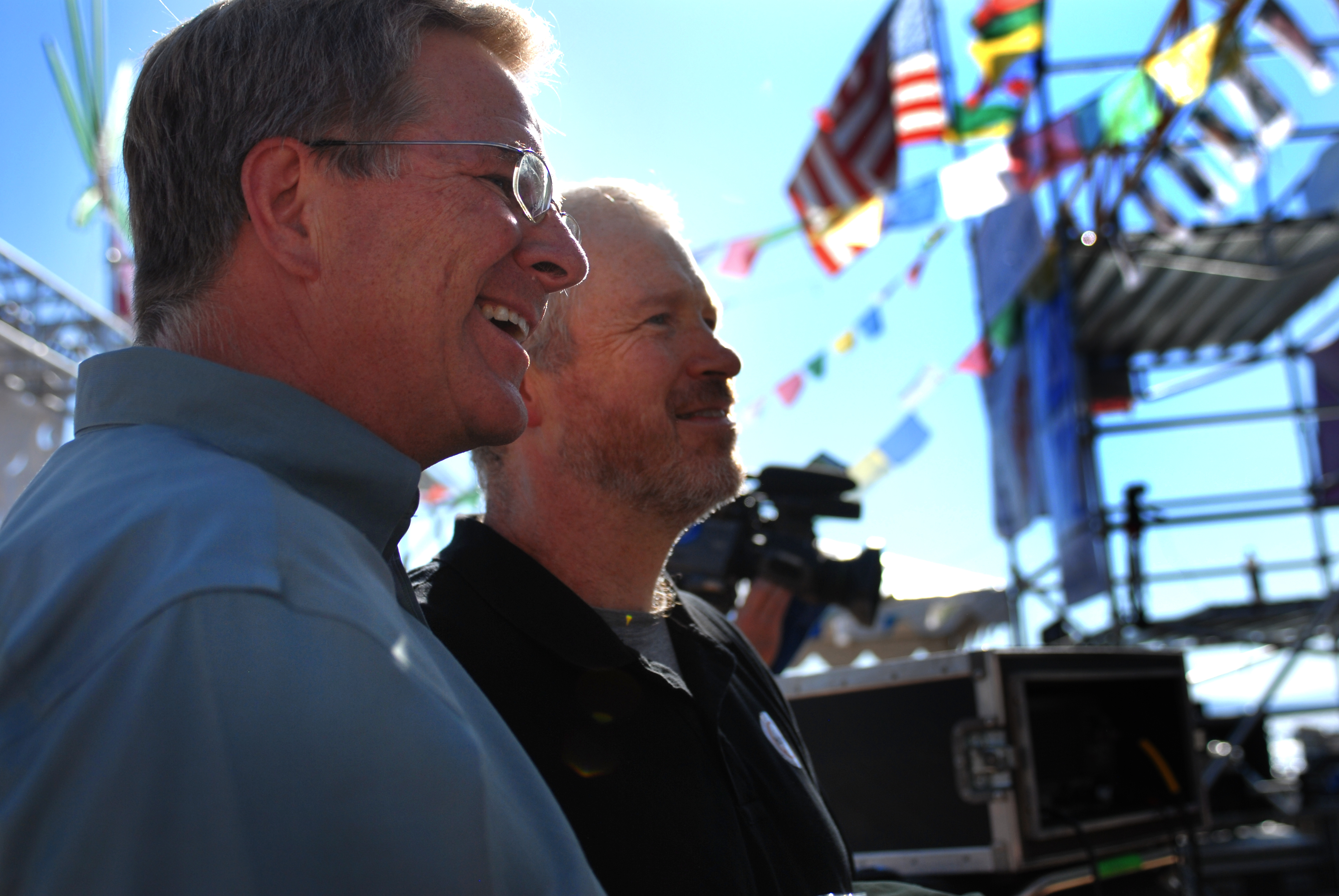
Rick Steves and Seattle Mayor Michael McGinn at Hempfest, 2011

In June 2019, acknowledging that travel is a source of environmental destruction, he announced that his tour company will donate $1 million a year to a portfolio of environmental nonprofits to mitigate the carbon emissions made from the 30,000 annual travelers who use his tour program. Critics contend that travel can never be carbon neutral and that his donations amount to being a way for the wealthy to feel better; Steves counters that if travelers prefer booking with his company due to the carbon offset, other travel companies will be forced to follow suit to stay in business.

In 2025, Rick Steves spoke at the April Hands Off protest and July No Kings protest in Edmonds.

== Personal life ==
Steves is an active Lutheran, and has written and hosted educational videos on subjects such as Martin Luther and the European Reformation, and supports liberation theology. He has spoken at the Lutheran Peace Fellowship.

Steves is of Norwegian ancestry. One of his sisters is an Iditarod racer.

Steves spends about a third of every year in Europe researching guidebooks and filming TV shows. His home is still in Edmonds, Washington, where he has lived since 1967.

He was married to Anne Steves until they divorced in 2010. They have two children. Their son, Andy, followed in his father's footsteps and founded his own travel company, Weekend Student Adventures Europe, and wrote Andy Steves' Europe: City-Hopping on a Budget.

Steves began dating Reverend Shelley Bryan Wee, Bishop of the Northwest Washington Synod in the Evangelical Lutheran Church in America, in December 2019.

In August 2024, Steves announced that he had been diagnosed with prostate cancer, and he had surgery in October. In December 2024, he spoke about his life in an interview aired on a podcast by The New York Times.

There's [sic] regrets. [A career in travel] has not been good for my family. I got divorced. It's not been great for relationships with loved ones. I would love to be the person I was before I was a travel writer. I would have had a very, very beautiful life being a piano teacher, coming home every night for dinner and mowing the lawn, and joining clubs, and ... being regular and reliable. But I've chosen a different path, and this is a path that is ... a mission for me. I've calculated it. And I've got an opportunity to be what I consider extremely productive, ... helping people travel in a constructive way. And I choose that knowing it's not gonna be without a cost. Yeah, I'm aware of that. And, ... in a way, I'm sad about it. But, again, you have to make a choice.

== Awards and honors ==
Steves has been awarded silver and gold Lowell Thomas Travel Journalism Awards from the Society of American Travel Writers Foundation for his audio, video, and book content.

To recognize his "outstanding service to church and society," the Luther Institute, an affiliate of the Lutheran Theological Seminary at Gettysburg, presented their Wittenberg Award to him.

The Rick Steves Service Above Self award is given annually by the Edmonds Rotary Club to an employee working within the Edmonds city limits who "is an exemplary citizen, making valuable contributions to their work, home, and community." The idea for the award came first, and the Club agreed that it should be named for Steves, citing his commitment to keep his employees paid and working during the COVID pandemic by having them perform volunteer work for the community, as well as other beneficial actions for the town.

Luther College in Iowa awarded Steves an honorary degree with a Doctor of Humane Letters honoris causa in 2025.

Steves won an Independent Publisher Book Award in 2015 for Travel as a Political Act, 2nd Edition.

== Selected works ==
=== Books about travel ===
- Europe Through the Back Door (1980–2024, 40 editions)
- Europe 101: History and Art for the Traveler, co-authored by Gene Openshaw (1983–2007, 7 editions)
- Postcards from Europe (1999)
- Travel as a Political Act (2009–2021, 3 editions)
- Europe's Top 100 Masterpieces: Art for the Traveler, co-authored by Gene Openshaw (2019)
- For the Love of Europe (2020)
- Italy for Food Lovers, co-authored by Fred Plotkin (2023)
- On the hippie trail: Istanbul to Kathmandu and the making of a travel writer (2025)

=== Guidebooks ===
Rick Steves has authored or coauthored dozens of guidebooks, many of which are updated annually, covering individual countries, cities, and regions of Europe.

=== Television ===
Rick Steves has written, produced, and/or starred in numerous television programs. These include the following long-running series, as well as various individual programs.

- Travels in Europe with Rick Steves (1991–1998)
- Rick Steves' Europe (2000–present)

=== Radio ===
- Travel with Rick Steves (2005–present)
