= Richard Bangs =

American writer and traveler

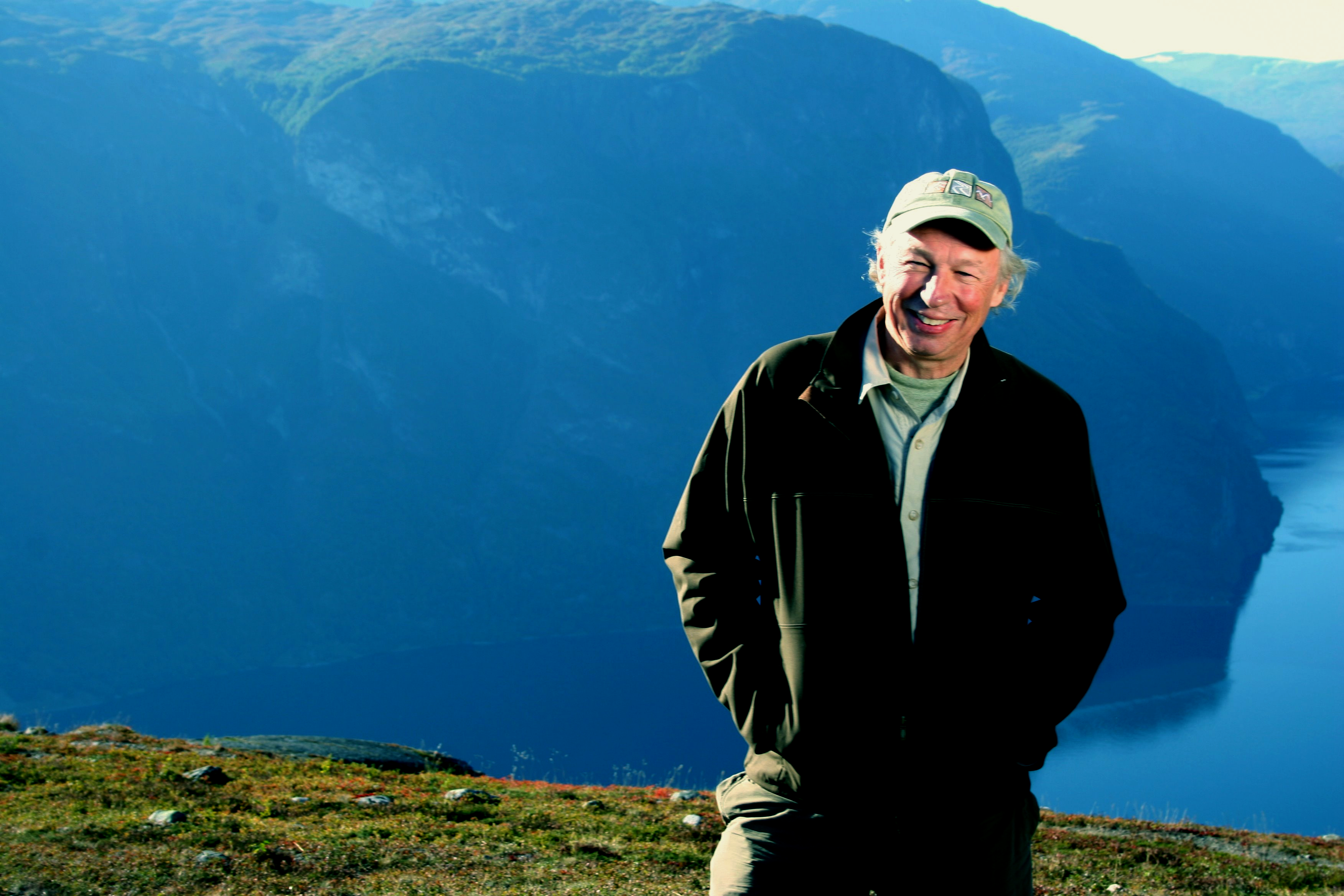
- Richard Bangs in 2013
- Born: Richard Johnston Bangs; August 24, 1950 (age 76); New Haven, Connecticut
- Education: Northwestern University (B.A., 1972); University of Southern California (M.A., 1975)
- Occupations: writer, traveler, TV host, explorer, producer
- Parent(s): Lawrence Cutler; Louise Bangs
- Website: www.richardbangs.com

Richard Johnston Bangs (born 1950) is an American author and television personality focusing on international travel. He is the host and executive producer of a series of American Public Television specials, including Richard Bangs Quests and Richard Bangs Adventures with Purpose

== River exploration and travel career ==
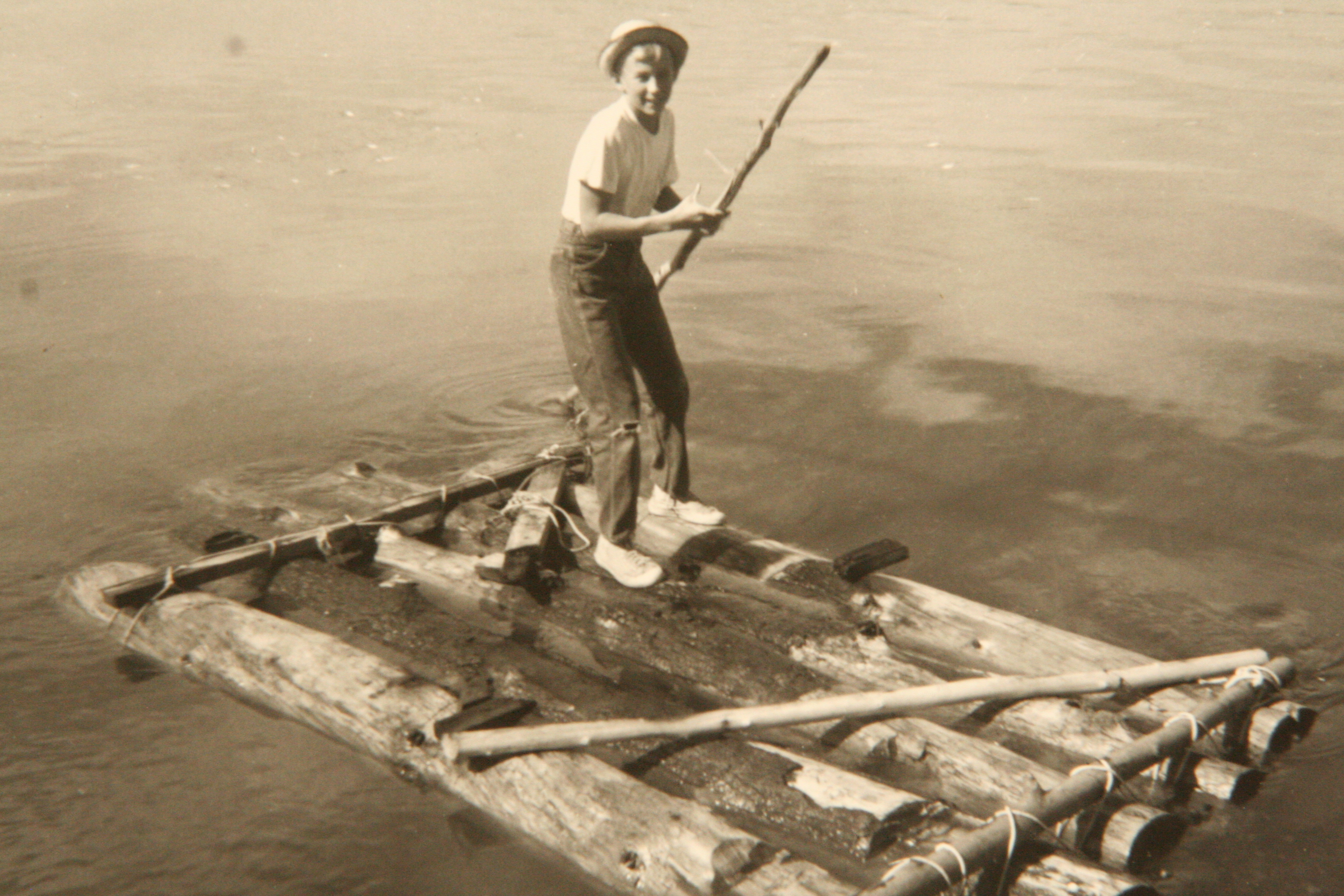
Richard Bangs rafting

Bangs' college summers were spent as a Colorado River guide in the Grand Canyon. After college, Bangs and some friends concocted a plan to run wild rivers in Ethiopia. In February 1973, he and his crew successfully ran the Awash River in Ethiopia. His identity as a river guide was solidified at that point.

Bangs and his penniless friends figured they could finance a return trip or two by taking clients along. And so they did – on the Omo in Ethiopia – and Sobek Expeditions (co-founded with John Yost) was born, named in gratitude for the Egyptian crocodile god who may have spared their lives on those early first descents. Sobek became a river-running exploratory company via which Bangs and fellow guides racked up 35 first descents. Sobek Expeditions merged with Mountain Travel to become Mountain Travel Sobek in 1991. Bangs served as president of Outward Bound (2001–2002).

== Media career ==
=== Writing and books ===
Bangs' articles and essays have appeared in many places, including in The New York Times, Slate and The Huffington Post. Bangs has authored 19 books. His book The Lost River: A Memoir of Life, Death and the Transformation of Wild Water won the National Outdoor Book Award in the literature category, and the Lowell Thomas Award for best book. Adventures with Purpose won the 2007 best book award from NATJA. Recent books are Quest for the Sublime (2008) and Quest for the Kasbah (2009).

=== Internet ===
Bangs was founder and editor-in-chief of Mungo Park, a pioneering Microsoft travel publishing effort. He also founded www.terra-quest.com. He was part of the founding executive team of Expedia.com, and served as its editor-at-large. He was creator and publisher of Expedia Travels Magazine (published in partnership with Ziff-Davis), and executive producer of Expedia Radio, and founder and executive director of Expedia Cafes. He founded the Well Traveled feature (Dispatches From The Front Lines of Travel) for Slate, and was founding editor and executive producer of Great Escapes at MSNBC.com. He also ran and founded First and Best for MSN, and in 2005 founded and headed up Richard Bangs Adventures for Yahoo! News.

=== Movies ===
In 1981 Bangs was hired as a stuntman for the film, Killing at Hells Gate, where a whitewater rafting party is terrorised during a trip down the river. In 1991 Bangs executive produced River of the Red Ape. In 1997 Bangs executive produced The Last Wild River Ride, a Turner Original Production about a team exploring Ethiopia's Tekeze River. In 2005 he co-directed the IMAX Film, Mystery of the Nile. Mystery of the Nile tells the story of a team of explorers, led by Pasquale Scaturro and Gordon Brown, that spend 114 days making their way along all 3,260 miles of the river to become the first in history to complete a full descent of the Blue Nile from source to sea.

=== Television ===
After the conclusion of the Richard Bangs Adventures series on Yahoo! News in 2006, Bangs launched a public TV series of specials known as Richard Bangs Adventures with Purpose all shot on location in Egypt, New Zealand, Switzerland, Morocco, Norway, India, Greece, Hong Kong, and Costa Rica. The goal of this series was to combine adventure with travel that makes a difference; travel that positively impacts the world. In 2012, Bangs launched "Richard Bangs Quests"; a White Nile Media, Inc. production. The pilot show, Richard Bangs South America: Quest for Wonder, was carried by KQED and American Public Television.

== Awards and nominations ==
- 2007 Mark Dubois lifetime achievement conservation award.
- 2008 CINE Golden Eagle Award for the special, Quest for Kaitiakitanga,
- six Tele Awards for Quest for the Nile, Quest for the Sublime, and Quest for the Kasbah.
- Quest for Kaitiakitanga was nominated for an Environmental Media Award ("The Green Oscars") for best documentary, and won the annual Platinum Award from HSMAI (Hospitality Sales & Marketing Association International). * Quest for the Viking Spirit won the 2009 Gold Lowell Thomas award for best documentary; and the same award for 2010 for the India show. Also, the series won two Emmys in 2010 in the History/Culture categories.
- 2011 Richard won the Lowell Thomas Travel Journalism Gold Award for Hong Kong: Quest for the Dragon—2011; the 2011 CINE Golden Eagle Award for Greece: Quest for the Gods; and two Telly Awards for Hong Kong: Quest for the Dragon.
- Quest for Harmony won the Gold in the Destination Marketing Category of the 2012 Travel Weekly Magellan Awards, as well as two Bronze Telly Awards, and the 2012 Lowell Thomas Award.
