= Toby Charles =

Football commentator

Toby Charles (born 1940) is a former Welsh football commentator. He is best known in North America as the host of Soccer Made in Germany, which aired in US markets on PBS stations during the 1970s and 1980s.
