= Soccer Made in Germany =

- Country of origin: United States

Production
- Running time: 1 hour

Original release
- Network: PBS
- Release: 1976 – 1988

Soccer Made in Germany was a PBS show created and executive produced by Joerg Klebe that ran from 1976 until 1988. The program, distributed to 256 PBS member stations by the German Educational Television Network (known today as Deutsche Welle) was initially sponsored by KQED Channel 9, San Francisco. The Emmy-nominated weekly series featured hour-long edited highlights of games involving West German association football teams and select international and European Cup games from UEFA. The show was hosted by Toby Charles from 1976 to 1983 and by Alan Fountain from 1983 to 1988. It was one of the first national TV programs dedicated exclusively to the sport of soccer in the United States.

== Notable broadcasts ==
Soccer Made in Germany showed a women's soccer German Cup match from Frankfurt in 1981. This pioneered the sport to U.S. audiences and promoted girls/women soccer in schools and universities, a trend that has been very successful to this day.

German Educational TV also produced a daily special program live from its New York studios, presenting highlights of the day from the 1982 FIFA World Cup from Spain. This was the first time that the FIFA World Cup was presented on Public Television in the United States. This led up to the Final Match, which, also live-broadcast on the ABC-Network (Jim McKay served as a co-commentator), was the first live showing of a FIFA World Cup event on U.S. network TV.

== See also ==
- Football in Germany
- Bundesliga
