= Laura Theodore =

American television host and chef

Laura Theodore is an American television host, radio host, jazz singer, actress, and chef. She is the co-creator of the Jazzy Vegetarian cooking series on PBS.

== Books ==
- Easy Vegan Home Cooking: Over 125 Plant-Based and Gluten-Free Recipes for Wholesome Family Meals (Hatherleigh Press, 2021)
- Jazzy Vegetarian
- Jazzy Vegetarian Classics
- Laura Theodore’s Vegan-Ease
- Deliciously Vegan (silver medals at the IBPA Benjamin Franklin Awards, Midwest Book Awards and the Living Now Book Awards)
- Vegan for Everyone
