= Dianne Buckner =

Canadian television journalist

- Education: Ryerson Polytechnical Institute (now Toronto Metropolitan University)
- Notable credits: Venture; Dragons' Den; Live It Up!; The Lang & O'Leary Exchange

Dianne Buckner is a Canadian television presenter, best known as a host of business-oriented programming, such as Venture and Dragons' Den, on CBC Television and CBC News Network.

Buckner has also been a guest anchor on CBC news programs such as CBC News: Sunday, Midday and As It Happens, and has served as a back-up anchor on CBC News Network. She previously worked for CTV, where she hosted the consumer awareness program Live It Up! and was a reporter for Canada AM and CTV National News.

She became host of Venture in 1997, succeeding Robert Scully.

She has been a four-time Gemini Award nominee, receiving nods for Best Host or Interviewer in a News Information Program or Series at the 19th Gemini Awards in 2004, Best News Information Series as a producer of Venture at the 20th Gemini Awards in 2005, Best Reality Program or Series as a producer of Venture's "The Big Switcheroo" at the 21st Gemini Awards in 2006, and Best Lifestyle/Practical Information Segment for Fortune Hunters at the 23rd Gemini Awards in 2008.

== Filmography ==
=== Television ===
Year	Title	Role	Notes
2005-2007	Venture	Herself - Host	
2013-2014	The Lang & O'Leary Exchange	Herself - Host	52 episodes
2006-2019	Dragon's Den	Herself - Host	169 episodes

== Awards and nominations ==
Year	Awards	Category	Nominated work	Results
2004	19th Gemini Awards	Best Host or Interview in a News Information Program or Series	Venture "Lawyer Sues Food Companies / The Corporation / AC Problems"	Nominated
2005	20th Gemini Awards	Best News Information Series	Venture	Nominated
2006	21st Gemini Awards	Best Reality Program or Series	Venture "The Big Switcheroo: Boston Pizza"	Nominated
2008	23rd Gemini Awards	Best Lifestyle or Practical Information Segment	Fortune Hunters "Easy Wash"	Nominated

== External list ==
- Dianne Buckner at IMDb
- Dianne Buckner on X
- Dianne Buckner on Instagram
