= Scully: The World Show =

- Created by: Robert Guy Scully
- Starring: Robert Guy Scully
- Country of origin: United States
- Original language: English

Production
- Production locations: Montreal, Quebec, Canada
- Production company: Télémission Information Inc.

Original release
- Network: American Public Television
- Release: November 5, 1983 – present

Scully: The World Show is a Canadian talk show hosted by Robert Scully, who has interviewed some of the world's most prominent and famous personalities. Each week, Scully discusses topical issues with Nobel laureates, heads of state, royalty, authors, financiers, athletes, designers, diplomats and philanthropists. The show, which debuted on November 5, 1988, has been taped worldwide. It is produced in Montreal, Quebec, Canada by Télémission Information Inc. and airs in syndication. The talk show was first syndicated for the 1998-'99 season and is distributed by American Public Television.
