= Journeys In Africa =

Journeys in Africa is a thirteen part series hosted by Bill Ball featuring Africa's wildlife and culture. A travelogue that explores the African continent, including big cities and small villages. The first season premiered September 5, 2013 and the second season premiered January 7, 2015.

== Episodes ==
Season 1
Name	Episode	Date	Description
Serengeti: The Great Migration	S1 E1	September 5, 2013	Africa's Serengeti region is visited in the first episode of the travel series.
Zanzibar: The Original Spice Island	S1 E2	September 12, 2013	A tour of Zanzibar, which is located off the coast of Tanzania.
Safari 101	S1 E3	September 19, 2013	How to prepare for a safari.
Ngorongoro: Battle for the Crater	S1 E4	September 26, 2013	Ngorongoro Conservation Area in Tanzania is visited.
Nairobi: The Enchanted City	S1 E5	October 3, 2013	Nairobi, Kenya, is visited. Also: the truth behind the "Out of Africa" story; endangered giraffes.
Tarangire: Land of the Elephant	S1 E6	October 10, 2013	A visit to Tarangire National Park in Tanzania spotlights the wildlife that roams the preserve, including elephants, buffalo and lions.
Kilwa: The Swahili King of the Indian Ocean	S1 E7	October 17, 2013	The ruins of Kilwa Kisiwani, a Swahili trading city, are toured. Also: big-game fishing in the Indian Ocean.
The Man-eaters of Tsavo	S1 E8	October 24, 2013	The mane-less lions of Kenya's Tsavo region are observed.
Mombasa: The Center of It All	S1 E9	October 31, 2013	The Portuguese and Arab roles in the slave trade are explored during a visit to the East Coast of Africa. Also: a snorkelling expedition.
Arusha-Manyara Hidden Wonders of the North	S1 E10	November 7, 2013	The Great Rift Valley in Africa is visited. The tour stops at two national parks. One is a rain forest that's home to colorful birds and monkeys; the other features a large lake centered on a vast plain.
Dar es Salaam-Tanga: Countdown to History	S1 E11	November 14, 2013	A tour of Tanzania includes Der es Salaam, its largest city, and the Tanga region. Included: Germany's influence on Tanzania; the story of Livingston's final trip across Africa.
Saadani: Where the Land Meets the Sea	S1 E12	November 21, 2013	Saadani National Park in Tanzania, which borders the ocean, is visited.
Mikumi: The Gateway to the Southern Circuit	S1 E13	November 28, 2013	Season 1 concludes at Mikumi National Park in Tanzania. Included: the salt works at the edge of the park.
Season 2
Name	Episode	Date	Description
Masai Mara: Where Lion Is King	S2 E1	January 7, 2015	Part 1 of 2. The Season 2 premiere features a wildebeest migration in Kenya's Masai Mara wildlife reserve.
Masai Mara: Land of the Leopard	S2 E2	January 14, 2015	Conclusion. In Kenya's Masai Mara wildlife reserve, host Bill Ball goes in search of leopards. Along the way, he spots a newborn gazelle trying to walk for the first time.
Cape Town: Africa's Malibu	S2 E3	January 21, 2015	Cape Town, South Africa, is toured. Included: the city's architecture; nearby vineyards; Africa's only penguin species; and the fabled Cape of Good Hope.
Amboseli: Land of Extremes	S2 E4	January 28, 2015	Amboseli National Park in Kenya is toured. Included: elephants; African buffalo; hippos; and birds. Host Bill Ball also visits with the local Maasai to see how they are adjusting to encroaching civilization.
Nakuru: Wonderland of Africa	S2 E5	February 4, 2015	Parks in western Kenya are toured.
Victoria Falls: The Land That Thunders	S2 E6	February 11, 2015	A visit to Victoria Falls, which straddle Zimbabwe and Zambia.
The North Cape: The Great Bloom	S2 E7	February 18, 2015	The annual flower bloom in South Africa's Northern Cape province is spotlighted. Also: the wildlife that lives in the arid land.
Durban: Land of Gandhi	S2 E8	February 25, 2015	The diverse South African city of Durban, which is where Gandhi began his political activism, is toured.
Hluhluwe: Rhino Central	S2 E9	March 4, 2015	Hluhluwe-iMfolozi Park, a nature reserve in South Africa, is visited. Included: its role in saving the endangered rhino.
Johannesburg: City of Many Faces	S2 E10	March 11, 2015	A tour of Johannesburg includes Soweto, the colonial Union Building and a nearby safari park.
Kruger: Hunt for the Cheetah	S2 E11	March 18, 2015	The cheetah is spotlighted during a visit to Kruger National Park in South Africa.
St. Lucia: Zulu Wilderness	S2 E12	March 25, 2015	St. Lucia, a UNESCO World Heritage wetland site located in South Africa's Zululand region, is toured.
Kilimanjaro: Roof of Africa	S2 E13	April 1, 2015	The Season 2 finale features an attempt to ascend Mount Kilimanjaro, the highest mountain in Africa.
