= Richard Bangs Adventures =

Yahoo! News feature series

Richard Bangs Adventures was a monthly Yahoo! News feature series aimed at capturing the untold stories about adventurers and explorers around the world. "We want to share stories that quicken the pulse and appeal to the growing interest in adventure travel," said Scott Moore, vice president of content operations at Yahoo!. The show's host was award winning author and journalist Richard Bangs. With over a dozen adventure travel books to his name and having co-founded America's oldest adventure travel company (Mountain Travel-Sobek), Bangs is considered by many as one of the founders of modern adventure travel.

The series included produced video, photo and written reportage. It premiered on October 25, 2005 and produced the following eight features during its run:

- Expedition Eiger: John Harlin's climb of the Eiger in Switzerland.
- Expedition Thailand: Secrets of the Sea Gypsies, Survivors of the Tsunami
- Expedition Panama: Searching for Panama’s Pirate Past
- Expedition Rwanda: Mountain Gorilla Trek
- Expedition Israel: Descending the Jordan from Source to Sea
- Expedition Australia: In Search of Australia Extreme
- Expedition Macedonia: Sacred Mysteries of Macedonia
- Expedition Bosnia: Rebirth of a Nation

The series was canceled later in 2006 though Yahoo! News left the site (http://adventures.yahoo.com) online for some time following its cancellation.

== History ==
Earlier in 2005 Yahoo! announced the formation of the Yahoo Media Group, to be located in Santa Monica, California and to be run by former ABC television executive Lloyd Braun. With this move Yahoo was "significantly strengthening our content pillar", according to Yahoo Chief Operating Officer at the time, Dan Rosensweig. The formation of the Yahoo Media Group and its location at Hollywood's doorstep was considered by many to be the culmination of Yahoo's effort to become a major player in online entertainment. Richard Bangs Adventures and Kevin Sites in the Hot Zone were widely promoted as examples of original content forthcoming from the newly formed Yahoo Media Group.
