= PBS =

American public broadcaster and television network

- Logo used since November 4, 2019
- Type: Non-commercial; Free-to-air television network; Public broadcaster
- Country: United States; 38.8621°N 77.0503°W
- Broadcast area: United States, reaching bordering regions via overspill of the American terrestrial network
- Affiliates: List of member stations
- Headquarters: Arlington County, Virginia, U.S.

Programming
- Languages: English; Spanish (via SAP audio track, select programs)
- Picture format: HDTV 1080i; (some stations transmit PBS programming in 720p or 1080p via ATSC 3.0 in some markets)

Ownership
- Owner: PBS's member public television stations
- Key people: Paula Kerger (president & CEO); Jonathan Barzilay (COO)

History
- Founded: November 3, 1969; 57 years ago
- Launched: October 5, 1970; 56 years ago
- Founder: Hartford N. Gunn Jr.; John Macy; James Day; Kenneth A. Christiansen
- Replaced: National Educational Television (1952–1970)

Links
- Webcast: Watch live (US only)
- Website: pbs.org

Availability

Streaming media
- Service(s): DirecTV Stream, Hulu + Live TV, Prime Video Live TV, YouTube TV

The Public Broadcasting Service (PBS) is an American public broadcaster and non-commercial, free-to-air television network based in Arlington, Virginia. PBS is a nonprofit organization and the most prominent provider of educational programs to public television stations in the United States, distributing shows such as Nature, Nova, Frontline, PBS News Hour, Washington Week, Masterpiece, American Experience, and children's programs such as Mister Rogers' Neighborhood, Sesame Street, Barney & Friends, Arthur, Curious George, The Magic School Bus, and others. Certain stations also provide spillover service to Canada.

PBS is funded by a combination of member station dues, pledge drives, corporate sponsorships, and donations from both private foundations and individual citizens. From its founding in 1969 up until 2025, it also received funding from the Corporation for Public Broadcasting. All proposed funding for programming is subject to a set of standards to ensure the program is free of influence from the funding source. PBS has over 350 member television stations, many owned by educational institutions, nonprofit groups both independent or affiliated with one particular local public school district or collegiate educational institution, or entities owned by or related to state government.

== History ==
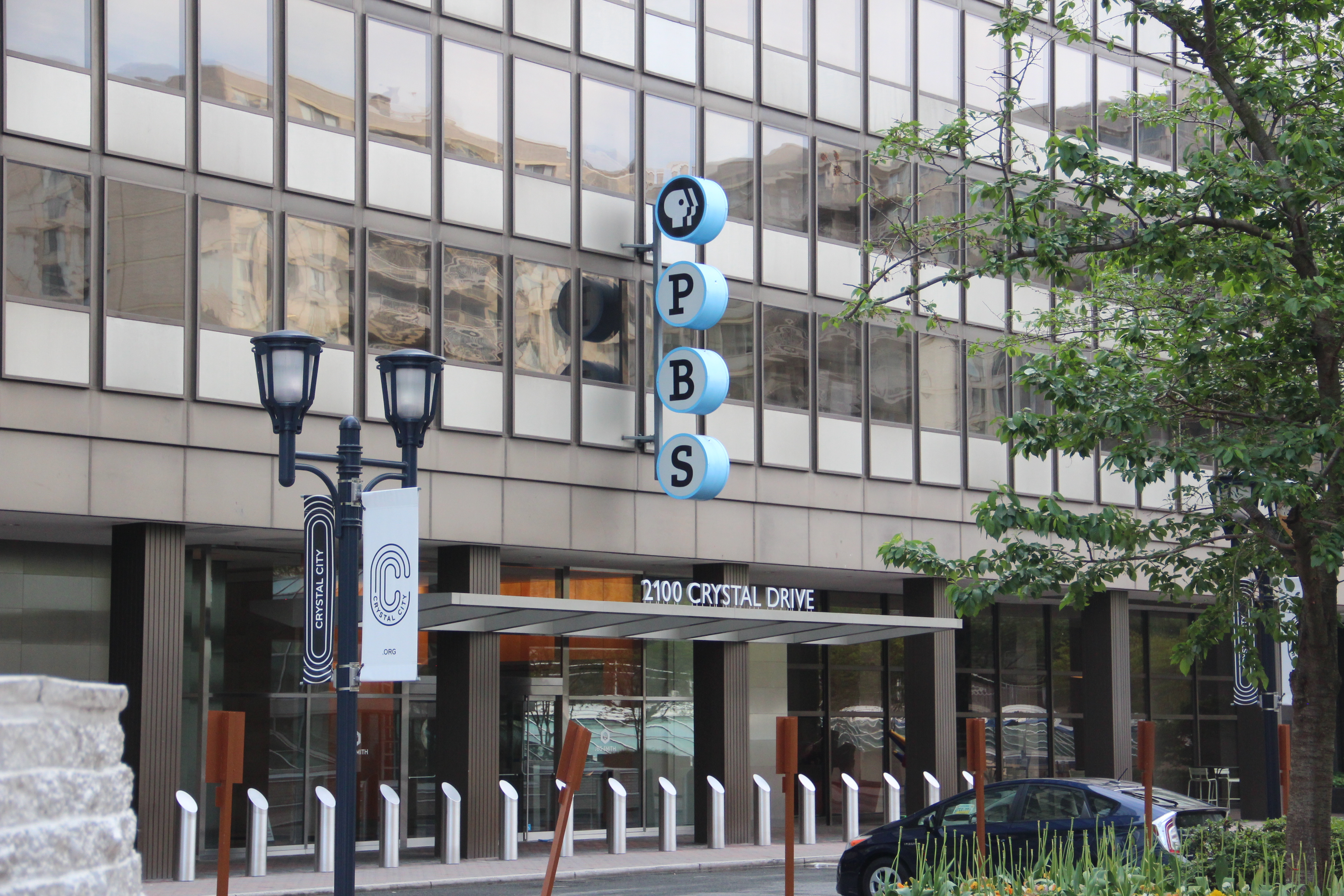
Former PBS headquarters in Crystal City, Virginia

PBS was established on November 3, 1969, by Hartford N. Gunn Jr. (president of WGBH), John Macy (president of CPB), James Day (last president of National Educational Television), and Kenneth A. Christiansen (chairman of the department of broadcasting at the University of Florida). Fred Friendly was an integral figure in negotiations about the interconnection that would lead to the 1969 creation of the Public Broadcasting Service (PBS).

It began operations on October 5, 1970, taking over many of the functions of its predecessor, National Educational Television (NET), which later merged with Newark, New Jersey station WNDT to form WNET. In 1973, it merged with Educational Television Stations. Around the same time, the groups started out the National Public Affairs Broadcast Center (later National Public Affairs Center for Television), which offered news and national affairs to the service. The group was later merged into member station WETA-TV in 1972.

Immediately after public disclosure of the Watergate scandal, on May 17, 1973, the United States Senate Watergate Committee commenced proceedings; PBS broadcast the proceedings nationwide, with Robert MacNeil and Jim Lehrer as commentators. Although all of the Big Three TV Networks ran coverage of the hearings, PBS rebroadcast them on prime time. For seven months, nightly "gavel-to-gavel" broadcasts drew great public interest, and raised the profile of the fledgling PBS network.

In 1974, PBS launched the National Station Program Cooperative, a joint venture used to fund programs for public television stations, with Corporation for Public Broadcasting and Ford Foundation holding minority stakes in the venture. In 1976, it was amended with public television stations taking most control and CPB and Ford holding reduced stakes and cash (called unrestricted general program grants). In 1977, public television stations took full control of the Station Program Cooperative, allowing to fund programs fully.

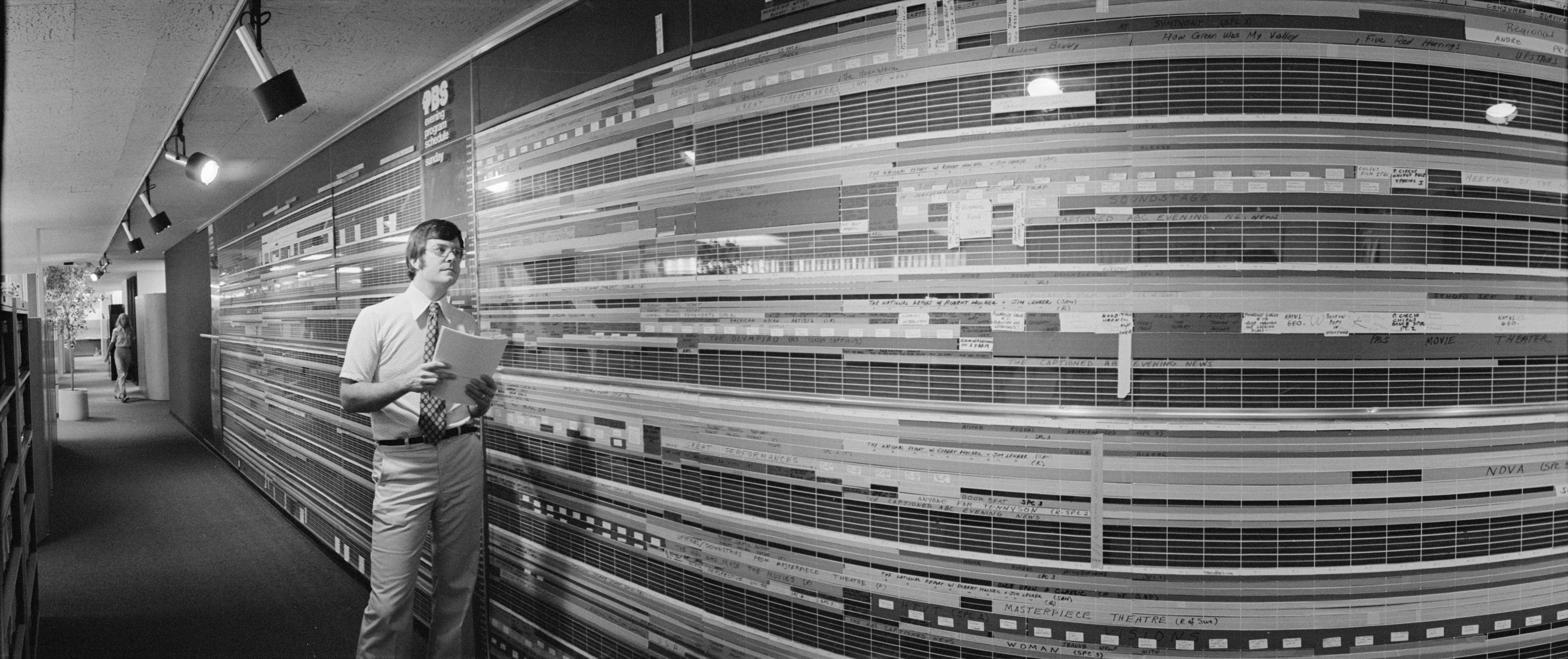
Panoramic image of a PBS programming schedule in 1976

In 1981, the Federal Communications Commission began allowing PBS to permit and accept corporate logos used for underwriting spots, mainly for sponsors, foundations and organizations. The logos used for underwriting had later evolved in 1982 to run commercials, mainly for sponsorship.

In 1988, a proposal to PBS was ratified in July 1989, as the original term used for underwriting spots, "public television stations" was too generic for audiences, so it was changed to "viewers like you". Two years later, a proposal for 1990 allowed major shows for 1991, like the Mark Russell comedy specials, Sesame Street, Washington Week in Review, Wall Street Week, Mister Rogers' Neighborhood, Austin City Limits, Nova and Nature automatically credit Corporation for Public Broadcasting in its underwriting credits, although most dropped it by the late 1990s.

In 1994, The Chronicle of Philanthropy released the results of the largest study on the popularity and credibility of charitable and non-profit organizations. PBS ranked as the 11th "most popular charity/non-profit in America" from over 100 charities researched in the study conducted by the industry publication, with 38.2% of Americans over the age of 12 choosing "love" and "like a lot" for PBS.

Since the mid-2000s, Roper Opinion Research polls commissioned by PBS have consistently placed the service as the most-trusted national institution in the United States. A 2016–2017 study by Nielsen Media Research found 80% of all US television households view the network's programs over the course of a year. However, PBS is not responsible for all programming carried on public television stations, a large proportion of which may come from its member stations—including WGBH-TV, WETA-TV, WNET, WTTW, WQED, WHYY-TV, Twin Cities PBS—American Public Television, and independent producers. This distinction regarding the origin of different programs on the service presents a frequent source of viewer confusion.

In December 2009, PBS signed up for the Nielsen ratings audience measurement reports, and began to be included in its primetime and daily "Television Index" reports, alongside the major commercial broadcast networks.

In May 2011, PBS announced that it would incorporate breaks containing underwriter spots for corporate and foundation sponsors, program promotions and identification spots within four breaks placed within episodes of Nature and NOVA, airing episodes broken up into segments of up to 15 minutes, rather than airing them as straight 50- to 55-minute episodes. The strategy began that fall, with the intent to expand the in-program breaks to the remainder of the schedule if successful.

In 2011, PBS released apps for iOS and Android to allow viewing of full-length videos on mobile devices.

"PBS UK" was launched as a paid subscription channel in the United Kingdom on November 1, 2011, featuring American documentary programming sourced from PBS. Better identifying its subject matter, this channel was renamed "PBS America" on July 4, 2012. The channel has subsequently become available in other parts of Europe and Australia.

On February 28, 2012, PBS partnered with AOL to launch Makers: Women Who Make America, a digital documentary series focusing on high-achieving women in male-dominated industries such as war, comedy, space, business, Hollywood and politics.

PBS initially struggled to compete with online media such as YouTube for market share. In a 2012 speech to 850 top executives from PBS stations, Senior Vice President of Digital Jason Seiken warned that PBS was in danger of being disrupted by YouTube studios such as Maker Studios. In the speech, later described as a "seminal moment" for public television, he laid out his vision for a new style of PBS digital video production. Station leadership rallied around his vision and Seiken formed PBS Digital Studios, which began producing educational but edgy videos, something Seiken called "PBS-quality with a YouTube sensibility". The studio's first hit, an auto-tuned version of the theme from one of their most famous television programs, Mister Rogers' Neighborhood, was one of YouTube's 10 most viral videos of 2012. By 2013, monthly video views on PBS.org had risen from 2 million to a quarter-billion, PBS.org traffic had surpassed that of the CBS, NBC, and ABC web sites, PBSKids.org had become the dominant US children's site for video, and PBS had won more 2013 Webby Awards than any other media company in the world.

On May 8, 2013, full-length episodes of PBS' prime time, news and children's programs were made available through the Roku streaming player; programming is available on Roku as separate streaming channels for "PBS" and "PBS Kids" content. Some content is only available with a PBS Passport member benefit subscription.

On July 1, 2016, Amazon Prime Video and PBS Distribution entered into a multi-year agreement which saw several PBS Kids series on other streaming services move to Amazon Prime Video.

PBS Distribution partnered with MultiChoice to launch PBS Kids on May 22, 2019, on DStv and GOtv subscription platforms across its Sub-Saharan Africa footprint. In mid-2021, the channel was added to Australia's Foxtel subscription platform.

At the summer 2019 Television Critics Association press tour day for PBS on July 29, 2019, it was announced that MVPD YouTube TV would begin to carry PBS programming and member stations in the fall of 2019. Member stations have the choice of having their traditional channel on the service with its full programming schedule received by Google over-the-air and uploaded to the service, a YouTube TV-only feed provided by the station with some programming substitutions due to lack of digital rights, or a PBS-provided feed with limited localization, though with no local programming or pledge drive programming.

In 2019, PBS announced plans to move its headquarters to another building in the Crystal Gateway complex, while remaining in Crystal City, Virginia, and did so in 2020, which included a top building sign visible off the Richmond Highway.

On August 4, 2020, the Amazon Prime Video platform added a "PBS Documentaries" package. As of that time it offered four separately-subscribable selections of PBS programming in the United States, "PBS Documentaries", "PBS Living" (also on Apple TV), "PBS Masterpiece" (also in Canada) and "PBS KIDS". In the UK, a "PBS America" documentaries package became available on Amazon Prime Video.

On September 3, 2020, PBS began to offer a livestream of its member stations for free via its website (as well as the websites of the member stations), on smart TVs, and on its mobile apps. However, only a small handful of stations currently do not have a livestream of their stations set up. Jefferson Graham of USA Today called it "arguably the best bargain in streaming".

On July 1, 2021, a PBS Julia Child channel was added to Pluto TV and Tubi in the United States.

The channels "PBS Antiques Roadshow", "Julia Child", "Antiques Road Trip" and "PBS Nature" were added to a number of American FAST platforms in January 2023. Antiques Road Trip later became available in Australia. The channels "PBS Food" (in the United States) and "PBS History" (in the UK and Australia) launched on certain FAST platforms in late 2023.

The channel "PBS Retro" was added to Roku's live TV channel lineup in the United States on April 23, 2024, airing PBS Kids shows from the 70s, 80s and 90s. The "PBS Science" channel became available in Australia in 2024. It is also available in the UK and Ireland.

On August 1, 2025, the Corporation for Public Broadcasting, from which PBS gets much of its funding, announced they were going to end operations due to being entirely defunded by the Rescissions Act of 2025.

In September 2025, PBS announced a 15% staff reduction, cutting about 100 jobs, including 34 immediate layoffs, in response to a $1.1 billion decrease in federal funding for public broadcasting over 2026 and 2027. The cuts, which came after the elimination of CPB funding starting October 1, 2025, and the loss of an educational grant earlier that year, led to a 21% drop in PBS's revenue.

== Operations ==
Even with its status as a non-profit and educational television network, PBS engages in program distribution. PBS provides television content and related services to its member stations, each of which together cooperatively owns the network. Unlike the affiliates for commercial TV networks, each non-profit PBS member station is charged with the responsibility of programming local content such as news, interviews, cultural, and public affairs programs for its individual market or state that supplements content provided by PBS and other public television distributors.

In a commercial broadcast television network structure, affiliates give up portions of their local advertising airtime in exchange for carrying network programming, and the network pays its affiliates a share of the revenue it earns from advertising. By contrast, PBS member stations pay fees for the shows acquired and distributed by the national organization. Under this relationship, PBS member stations have greater latitude in local scheduling than their commercial broadcasting counterparts. Scheduling of PBS-distributed series may vary greatly depending on the market. This can be a source of tension as stations seek to preserve their localism, and PBS strives to market a consistent national lineup. However, PBS has a policy of "common carriage", which requires most stations to clear the national prime time programs on a common programming schedule to market them nationally more effectively. Management at former Los Angeles member KCET cited unresolvable financial and programming disputes among its major reasons for leaving PBS after over 40 years in January 2011, although it would return to PBS in 2019.

Although PBS has a set schedule of programming, particularly in regard to its prime time schedule, member stations reserve the right to schedule PBS-distributed programming in other time slots or not clear it at all if they choose to do so; few of the service's members carry all its programming. Most PBS stations timeshift some distributed programs. Once PBS accepts a program offered for distribution, PBS, rather than the originating member station, retains exclusive rebroadcasting rights during an agreed period. Suppliers, however, retain the right to sell the program's intellectual property in non-broadcast media such as DVDs, books, and sometimes PBS-licensed merchandise.

== Programming ==
The evening and primetime schedule on PBS features a diverse array of programming including fine arts (Great Performances); drama (Masterpiece, Downton Abbey, American Family: Journey of Dreams); science (Nova, Nature); history (American Experience, American Masters, History Detectives, Antiques Roadshow); music (Austin City Limits, Soundstage); public affairs (Frontline, PBS NewsHour, Washington Week, Nightly Business Report); independent films and documentaries (P.O.V., Independent Lens); home improvement (This Old House); and interviews (Amanpour & Company, Tavis Smiley, The Dick Cavett Show). In 2012, PBS began organizing much of its prime time programming around a genre-based schedule (for example, drama series encompass the Sunday schedule, while science-related programs are featured on Wednesdays).

Unlike its radio counterpart, National Public Radio, PBS does not have a central program production arm or news division. All of the programming carried by PBS, whether news, documentary or entertainment, is created by (or in most cases produced under contract with) other parties, such as individual member stations. Boston member WGBH-TV is one of the largest producers of educational television programming, including shows like American Experience, Arthur (with Canada-based CINAR), Masterpiece Theatre, Nova, Antiques Roadshow and Frontline as well as many other children's and lifestyle programs. News programs are produced by WETA-TV (PBS News Hour) in Washington, D.C., WNET in New York City and WPBT in Miami. Newark, New Jersey/New York City member WNET produces or distributes programs such as Secrets of the Dead, Nature, and Cyberchase. PBS also works with other networks for programming such as CNN International for Amanpour & Company which is a co-production of CNN International and WNET.

PBS member stations are known for rebroadcasting British television costume dramas, comedies and science fiction programs (acquired from the BBC and other sources) such as Downton Abbey; 'Allo 'Allo!; Are You Being Served?; The Benny Hill Show, Red Dwarf; The Fall and Rise of Reginald Perrin; Father Ted; Fawlty Towers; Harry Enfield & Chums; Keeping Up Appearances; Monty Python's Flying Circus; Mr. Bean, The Vicar of Dibley, the original run of Doctor Who, and Sherlock. However, a significant amount of sharing takes place. The BBC and British broadcasters such as Channel 4 often cooperate with PBS stations, producing material that is shown on both sides of the Atlantic. Less frequently, Canadian, Australian and other international programming appears on PBS stations (such as The Red Green Show, currently distributed by syndicator Executive Program Services); public broadcasting syndicators are more likely to offer this programming to U.S.-based public television stations.

PBS is not the only distributor of public television programming to the member stations. Other distributors have emerged from the roots of companies that maintained loosely held regional public television stations in the 1960s. Boston-based American Public Television, also formerly known as Eastern Educational Network and the American Program Service, among other names, is another major distributor of programming to U.S. non-commercial stations. The National Educational Telecommunications Association (NETA, formerly SECA) is another distributor, with properties including The Shapies and Jerry Yarnell School of Fine Art. In addition, the member stations themselves also produce a variety of local shows, some of which subsequently receive national distribution through PBS or other distributors.

Rerun programming, especially domestic programming not originally produced for public television, is generally uncommon on PBS or its member stations. The most prominent exception to this is The Lawrence Welk Show, which has aired continuously in reruns on PBS (through the Oklahoma Educational Television Authority) almost every weekend since 1986. Reruns of programs originally produced for public television are common, especially with former PBS shows whose hosts have retired or died (for example, The Joy of Painting and Mister Rogers' Neighborhood). Children's programming (such as Clifford the Big Red Dog and DragonflyTV, the latter of which is also syndicated on commercial television) is rerun extensively. In 2020 and 2021, PBS served as the over-the-air home to select specials from the Peanuts library, under sublicense from Apple; the deal was not renewed in 2022.

=== PBS Kids ===
Launched as PTV on July 11, 1994, PBS Kids is the brand for children's programs aired by PBS. PBS Kids, launched in 1999 and operated until 2005, was largely funded by satellite provider DirecTV. The original channel ceased operations on September 26, 2005, in favor of PBS Kids Sprout, a commercial digital cable and satellite television channel originally operated as a joint venture between PBS, Comcast, Sesame Workshop and Apax Partners (NBCUniversal, which Comcast acquired in 2011, later acquired the other partners' interests in the channel in 2012). However, the original programming block still exists on PBS, filling daytime and in some cases, weekend morning schedules on its member stations; many members also carry 24-hour locally programmed children's networks featuring PBS Kids content on one of their digital subchannels. A revived version of the PBS Kids Channel was launched on January 16, 2017. As of 2019, PBS Kids is the only children's programming block on U.S. broadcast television.

As the children's programs it distributes are intended to educate as well as entertain its target audience, PBS and its stations have long been in compliance with educational programming guidelines set by the Federal Communications Commission in response to the enactment of the Children's Television Act of 1990. Many member stations have historically also broadcast distance education and other instructional television programs, typically during daytime slots; though with the advent of digital television, which has allowed stations to carry these programs on digital subchannels in lieu of the main PBS feed or exclusively over online, many member stations/networks have replaced distance education content with children's and other programming.

As of February 2023, the duration of the PBS Kids block was reduced from 13 hours of daily programming including both before- and after-school programs, down to eight hours primarily in the mornings. This move was meant to cater to more general audiences in the afternoons, and as part of an ongoing move of kids programming to on-demand streaming services.

As PBS is often known for doing, PBS Kids has broadcast imported series from other countries; these include British series originally broadcast by the BBC and ITV. Through American Public Television, many PBS stations also began airing the Australian series Raggs on June 4, 2007. Some of the programs broadcast as part of the service's children's lineup or through public broadcast syndication directly to its members have subsequently been syndicated to commercial television outlets (such as Ghostwriter and The Magic School Bus).

=== Sports ===
Many PBS member stations and networks—including Mississippi Public Broadcasting (MHSAA), Georgia Public Broadcasting (GHSA), Maine Public Broadcasting Network (MPA), Iowa PBS (IGHSAU), Nebraska Public Media (NSAA), and WKYU-TV (Western Kentucky Hilltoppers)—locally broadcast high school and college sports. From the 1980s onward, the national PBS network has not typically carried sporting events, mainly because the broadcast rights to most sporting events have become more cost-prohibitive in that timeframe, especially for nonprofits with limited revenue potential; in addition, starting with the respective launches of the MountainWest Sports Network (now defunct) and Big Ten Network in 2006 and 2007 and the later launches of the Pac-12 Network and ESPN's SEC Network and ACC Network, athletic conferences have acquired rights for all of their member university's sports programs for their cable channels, restricting their use from PBS member stations, even those associated with their own universities.

From 1976 to 1989, KQED produced a series of Bundesliga matches under the banner Soccer Made in Germany, with Toby Charles announcing. PBS also carried tennis events, as well as Ivy League football. Notable football commentators included Upton Bell, Marty Glickman, Bob Casciola, Brian Dowling, Sean McDonough and Jack Corrigan. Other sports programs included interview series such as The Way It Was (hosted by Curt Gowdy) and The Sporting Life.

== Governance ==
The board of directors is responsible for governing and setting policy for PBS, consisting of 27 members: 14 professional directors (station managers), 12 general directors (outside directors), and the PBS president. All PBS Board members serve three-year terms, without pay. PBS member stations elect the 14 professional directors; the board elects the 12 general directors and appoints the PBS president and CEO; and the entire board elects its officers.

== Member stations ==
As of March 2015, PBS maintains current memberships with 354 television stations encompassing 50 states, the District of Columbia and four U.S. possessions; as such, it is the only television broadcaster in the United States—commercial or non-commercial—which has station partners licensed in every U.S. state (by comparison, none of the five major commercial broadcast networks has affiliates in certain states where PBS has members, most notably New Jersey). The service has an estimated national reach of 93.74% of all households in the United States (or 292,926,047 Americans with at least one television set).

PBS stations are commonly operated by nonprofit organizations, state agencies, local authorities (such as municipal boards of education), or universities in their city of license; this is similar (albeit more centralized in states where a licensee owns multiple stations rebroadcasting the main PBS member) to the early model of commercial broadcasting in the U.S., in which network-affiliated stations were initially owned by companies that owned few to no other television stations elsewhere in the country. In some U.S. states, a group of PBS stations throughout the entire state may be organized into a single regional "subnetwork" (such as Alabama Public Television and Arkansas PBS); in this model, PBS programming and other content is distributed by the originating station in the subnetwork to other full-power stations that serve as satellites as well as any low-power translators in other areas of the state. Some states may be served by such a regional network and simultaneously have PBS member stations in a certain city (such as the case with secondary member KBDI-TV in Denver, which is not related to Colorado member network Rocky Mountain PBS and its flagship station and primary Denver PBS member, KRMA-TV) that operate autonomously from the regional member network.

As opposed to the present commercial broadcasting model in which network programs are often carried exclusively on one television station in a given market, PBS may maintain more than one member station in certain markets, which may be owned by the licensee of the market's primary PBS member station or owned by a separate licensee (as a prime example, KOCE-TV, KLCS and KVCR-DT—which are all individually owned—serve as PBS stations for the Los Angeles market; KCET served as the market's primary PBS member until it left the service in January 2011, at which time it was replaced by KOCE). KCET rejoined PBS in 2019, thus giving the Los Angeles area four different member stations.

For these cases, PBS uses the Program Differentiation Plan, which divides by percentage the number of programs distributed by the service that each member can carry on their schedule; often, this assigns a larger proportion of PBS-distributed programming to the primary member station, with the secondary members being allowed to carry a lesser number of program offerings from the service's schedule. Unlike public broadcasters in most other countries, PBS cannot own any of the stations that broadcasts its programming; therefore, it is one of the few television programming bodies that does not have any owned-and-operated stations. This is partly due to the origins of the PBS stations themselves, and partly due to historical broadcast license issues.

=== Participating stations ===
Most PBS member stations have produced at least some nationally distributed programs. Current regularly scheduled programming on the PBS national feed is produced by a smaller group of stations, including:

- WGBH-TV (Arthur, NOVA, Masterpiece, Frontline, Fetch! with Ruff Ruffman, Martha Speaks, Peep and the Big Wide World, Between the Lions, Curious George, Lidia's Kitchen, Design Squad, Jamie Oliver, etc.)
- WNET (Nature, PBS NewsHour Weekend, Cyberchase, Amanpour & Company, Wishbone etc.)
  - Previously Connecticut Public Television and now WNET (Barney & Friends, Bob the Builder, Thomas & Friends, etc.)
- WETA-TV (PBS News Hour, Washington Week, A Capitol Fourth (annually), America's Test Kitchen, This Old House, Pati's Mexican Table, BBC World News, etc.)
- WTTW (Nature Cat, WordWorld, Kidsongs)
- Maryland Public Television (MotorWeek, Space Racers, Wimzie's House, Zoboomafoo, Julia Child)
- KLRU (Austin City Limits)
- KCET (Sid the Science Kid)
- KVIE (America's Heartland)
- PBS SoCal (Lost L.A.)
- KQED (The Cat in the Hat Knows a Lot About That!, Yan Can Cook: Spice Kingdom)
- Oregon Public Broadcasting (History Detectives, Rick Steves' Europe (season 10))
- PBS North Carolina (The Woodwright's Shop)
- South Carolina ETV (Studio See, The Magic School Bus, A Chef's Life)
- WXXI-TV (Biz Kid$)
- WQED (Mister Rogers' Neighborhood)
- Twin Cities PBS (KTCA-TV/KTCI-TV) (Newton's Apple, DragonflyTV, SciGirls, Hero Elementary)
- KCTS-TV (Rick Steves' Europe, Bill Nye The Science Guy)
- Arkansas PBS (State of the Art)
- WYES-TV (Kevin Belton)
- WNED-TV (Reading Rainbow)
- WIPB (The Joy of Painting with Bob Ross) (Previously WNVC for the first season)

== PBS networks ==
Network	Notes
PBS Kids	A programming block that provides children's television programs. The block was formerly called PTV Park. Launched as a 24/7 network in 1999 that was dissolved in 2005 and subsequently revived in 2017.
PBS Satellite Service	A 24-hour alternate network feed that provides a mixed variety of programming selected from the main PBS service, as well as for carriage on programming tiers of satellite providers.

PBS has spun off a number of television networks, often in partnership with other media companies. PBS YOU, a distance education and how-to service operated between 2000 and 2006, and was largely succeeded by Create (a similarly formatted network owned by American Public Television). The 24-hour PBS Kids Channel has had two iterations in the age of digital television; one which existed between 1999 and 2005 (being superseded by PBS Kids Sprout), and the current version which was launched in 2017. World began operations in 2007 as a service operated by PBS but is now managed by American Public Television.

PBS has also restructured its satellite feed system, simplifying HD02 (PBS West) into a timeshift feed for the Pacific Time Zone, rather than a high-definition complement to its formerly primary SD feed. PBS Kids Go! was proposed as a replacement broadcast network for the original 1999–2005 version of the PBS Kids Channel; however, plans to launch the network were folded in 2006. Programming from the PBS Satellite Service has also been carried by certain member stations or regional member networks to fill their overnight schedules (particularly those that have transitioned to a 24-hour schedule since the late 1990s), in lieu of providing programming sourced from outside public television distributors or repeats of local programming (program promotions shown on the satellite feed advertise upcoming programs as being aired on PBS during the timeslot card normally used as a placeholder for member outlets to insert local airtime information).

Some or all of these services are available on a digital cable tier of many cable providers, on a free-to-air (FTA) satellite receiver receiving from PBS Satellite Service, as well as via subscription-based direct broadcast satellite providers. With the exception of Sprout, some of these services, including those from PBS member stations and networks, have not made contracts with Internet-distributed over-the-top MVPD services such as Sling TV and the now defunct PlayStation Vue. With the transition to over-the-air digital television broadcasts, many of the services are also often now available as standard-definition multicast channels on the digital signals of some member stations, while HD02 (PBS West) serves as a secondary HD feed. With the absence of advertising, network identification on these PBS networks was limited to use at the end of the program, which includes the standard series of bumpers from the "Be More" campaign.

=== Independent networks ===
While not operated or controlled by PBS proper, additional public broadcasting networks are available and carried by PBS member stations. The following three are also distributed by PBS via satellite.

Channel	Programming	Origin
Create	Educational and artistic programming	American Public Television
World	News and documentaries	American Public Television
First Nations Experience	Indigenous programming	San Bernardino Community College District

From 2002 to 2011, Buffalo, New York member station WNED-TV operated ThinkBright TV, a service that was carried on several stations in upstate New York. Several state networks also offer a public affairs subchannel network offering full-time coverage of state government events and legislative/judicial proceedings in the same vein as C-SPAN's coverage of the federal government. Many PBS stations also carried MHz Worldview from the MHz Networks until 2020 when MHz Networks announced its discontinuation of the network on March 1, 2020. Since then, many stations has switched to World Channel as well as First Nations Experience.

A separate but related concept is the state network, where a group of stations across a state simulcast a single programming schedule from a central facility, which may include specialty subchannels unique to that broadcaster.

== Visual identity ==
PBS's initial logo, utilized from 1970 to 1971, with the same colors as the NET logo from 1967

PBS's second logo, the first iteration to include the "P-Head" element

PBS's third logo, as used from 1984 to 2019. The logo pictured is the 2002 version.

PBS logo from 1984 to 1989

PBS logo from 1989 to 1992

PBS logo from 1992 to 1996

PBS logo from 1996 to 1998

Alternate PBS logo from 1984 to 1998

PBS logo from 1998 to 2002

PBS logo from 2009 to 2019

PBS introduced its first iconographic logo in 1971, a multi-colored wordmark of the network's initials with the P designed to resemble a silhouette of a human face. The logo was designed by Ernie Smith and Herb Lubalin of the Lubalin Smith Carnase design firm. Lubalin's human face "P", known internally at PBS as "Everyman", but more commonly known as the "P-Head", became the basis for all subsequent PBS logos. Prior to this, PBS had used a sans-serif all caps font, colored in NET's primaries, reading "Public Broadcasting Service" as a bumper from 1970 to the introduction of the "P" in 1971.

In 1984, PBS introduced a new version of the logo, designed by Tom Geismar of Chermayeff & Geismar. Chermayeff & Geismar felt that the Lubalin-designed logo was too similar to those of the three dominant commercial networks of the time, and they sought "to develop a symbol that could stand for the more inclusive concept of 'public television'". They inverted Lubalin's Everyman "P" to face to the right instead of the left, and repeated the outline as a series to represent a "multitude" of people. The symbol was subsequently renamed "Everyone". The repeated outline of the face has also been interpreted to suggest a degree of multiculturalism, as well as the public service aspect of the PBS mission.

The logo has been used in various forms since: from 1998 onward, the Geismar logo has been rendered in white on a circle.

On November 4, 2019, in honor of the network's 50th anniversary, PBS unveiled a revamped brand identity by Lippincott, intended to be better-suited for use on digital platforms. The Geismar logo was tweaked, a new custom sans-serif typeface known as PBS Sans was commissioned for the logo and other branding elements (which replaces the slab serif typeface used in the PBS logo since 1984), and electric blue and white were adopted as corporate colors. The network is allowing flexibility in implementation, but is no longer allowing the logo to be displayed independently of the PBS name. Upon the launch of the new logo, some members rebranded themselves to include PBS in their name for the first time, such as Wisconsin Public Television rebranding as PBS Wisconsin. PBS is paying out grants to at least 100 members to cover costs associated with the rebranding.

== Reception ==
=== Critical response ===
PBS has been praised by critics for its variety of programming. Tim Goodman of The Hollywood Reporter marked PBS' airing of Downton Abbey as a turning point for the network's reputation and program variety. He also wrote, "It's PBS's time to shine" and said that the network "is an endless bounty of riches...Ain't this great?" Stevenonymous of BuzzFeed wrote, "PBS isn't just TV anymore." David Zurawik of The Baltimore Sun wrote, "If you want a reason to believe in PBS...here it is." Mekeisha Madden Toby of TheWrap wrote, "There is a lot to love...on PBS." Kristen McQuinn of Book Riot wrote, "PBS is awesome in every way." Caroline Framke of Variety wrote, "There's still no beating PBS." Alyssa Rosenburg of The Washington Post wrote, "PBS is a unifying thread...through our cultural fabric." Margaret Renkl of The New York Times wrote, "By aiming to unite...PBS might save us yet." Margie Barron of Entertainment Today wrote, "PBS remains a beacon...that inspires." The Marketing & Research Resources survey, said that PBS is the "#1 most trusted media 19 years in a row." In 2021, the network had 14 News & Documentary Emmy Award nominations, more than any other organization. Matt Roush of TV Insider wrote, "PBS is and always has been a bright light." For the PBS Arts program, Rob Owen of Pittsburgh Post-Gazette wrote, "A gift to viewers."

=== On-air fundraising ===
Since 53% to 60% of public television's revenues come from private membership donations and grants, most stations solicit individual donations by methods including fundraising, pledge drives or telethons, which disrupt regularly scheduled programming. This has been perceived as potentially annoying since regularly scheduled programming is often replaced with specials aimed at a wider audience (such as music specials aimed at the Baby Boomer generation and financial, health and motivational programs) to solicit new members and donations; during fundraising events, these programs are often interrupted within the broadcast by long-form segments (of six to eight minutes in length) encouraging viewers to donate to their PBS member. Underwriting spots are aired at the end of each program, which differ from traditional commercials in several ways. Each spot must be approved to meet several guidelines. The main guidelines state that underwriting spots cannot be qualitative in any way, nor can they have any call to action.

== Concerns and investigations ==
=== Accusations of political/ideological bias ===
A 1982 broadcast of the United States Information Agency program Let Poland be Poland about the martial law declared in Poland in 1981 was condemned by broadcasters in communist Eastern Europe, who labeled it as "provocative and anticommunist" propaganda, reflecting the regimes' opposition to criticism of their actions or ideology.

In 1999, at least three public television stations were caught selling or trading their mailing lists with the Democratic National Committee. Under IRS regulations, nonprofit organizations are prohibited from participating in political actions. Officials from the Corporation for Public Broadcasting condemned the practice and conducted an investigation into the matter. The stations involved were in New York, Boston, and Washington.

Individual programs aired by PBS have been the targets of organized campaigns by individuals and groups with opposing views, including by former United States Secretary of Education Margaret Spellings in 2005.

==== Accusations during Tomlinson tenure ====
In September 2003, Kenneth Tomlinson was chosen as chairman of the CPB board. He criticized PBS and NPR for what he alleged to be a "liberal bias". His efforts sparked complaints of political pressure.

To partially balance out the perceived left-leaning PBS shows, from June 2004 to July 2005, PBS aired Tucker Carlson: Unfiltered with conservative commentator Tucker Carlson, and from September 2004 to December 2005, PBS aired The Journal Editorial Report with Paul Gigot, a conservative editor of The Wall Street Journal editorial page. In December 2004, Bill Moyers resigned as a PBS regular, citing political pressure to alter the content of his program, and saying Tomlinson had pursued a "vendetta" against him.

In May 2005, two House Democrats requested the CPB inspector general investigate the complaints of political interference. The inspector general's report was issued in November 2005 and described possible political influence on personnel decisions, including e-mail correspondence between Tomlinson and the White House which indicated that Tomlinson "was strongly motivated by political considerations in filling the president/CEO position", a position filled in June 2005 by former Republican National Committee co-chair Patricia Harrison. Tomlinson resigned from the CPB board on November 3, 2005.

=== Second Trump administration ===
==== FCC underwriting investigation ====
In January 2025, Federal Communications Commission (FCC) Chair Brendan Carr ordered an investigation of the corporate underwriting sponsorships of PBS and NPR member stations for possible violations of FCC regulations prohibiting noncommercial broadcasters from airing advertisements. The following March, the Senate Permanent Subcommittee on Investigations opened an inquiry into the investigation ordered by Carr. In 1981, Congress amended the Communications Act of 1934 to authorize noncommercial station licensees to offer services and facilities in exchange for remuneration on the condition that it not interfere with their provision of public telecommunications services. (Note: However, while public television stations may apply under the FCC's must-carry rules for carriage by multichannel video programming distributors (such as cable and satellite television operators), the Communications Act bars public television stations from receiving retransmission consent fees from MVPDs that commercial television stations may receive under the 1992 Cable Act.) (Note: Also, while streaming television services often include local broadcast television channels, reports issued by the Congressional Research Service in 2016 and 2020 noted that the FCC had not expanded its definition of multichannel video programming distributors to include online video distributors, and that the regulatory framework for broadcast, cable, and satellite television does not generally apply to streaming services (including must-carry requirements).) In 1984, the FCC adopted a policy under the amendment allowing noncommercial stations to broadcast underwriting spots from for-profit entities that provided donations or underwriting.

While the FCC prohibited underwriting spots from including certain specific content (e.g. promotion of the contributor's products, services, or business, comparative or qualitative descriptions of products, price information, calls to action, or inducements to buy, sell, or lease products), the FCC has generally given noncommercial broadcasters deference in determining compliance with its underwriting rules, placed no specific limit on the length of the underwriting spots, and permitted the use of logos and slogans for the purpose of identifying the contributor, business location information and phone numbers, value-neutral descriptions of product or service lines, brand and trade names, and product and service listings. Also, the FCC's underwriting rules and prohibition on noncommercial broadcasters receiving advertising only apply to underwriting spots that are broadcast and do not apply to the websites of noncommercial broadcasters. (Note: However, any advertising revenue received by nonprofit organizations registered as 501(c)(3) organizations is still subject to Unrelated Business Income Tax under the Internal Revenue Code.) The 1981 amendment to the Communications Act also established a temporary commission to identify alternative sources of funding for public broadcasting and study the potential for advertising revenue using limited demonstrations, but in its final report released in 1983, the commission found that the prospect of significant advertising revenue was limited and instead recommended that Congress continue providing the appropriation to Corporation for Public Broadcasting (CPB).

In 2012, the CPB issued a report commissioned by Congress and that included market analysis conducted by Booz & Company which noted that corporate underwriting accounted for less than one-fifth of the revenue for public television and radio stations and had declined substantially due to the Great Recession. Along with the 1983 report and a 2007 Government Accountability Office report about public television specifically, the CPB report concluded that growth in such underwriting revenue was unlikely, that allowing public broadcasters to air advertisements would not offset a decline in federal funding while likely contributing to a decline in support from other sources, and that there was no alternative source of funding to the federal CPB appropriation that could sustain public broadcasting service at the same level. Analysis of CPB data published by the Pew Research Center in August 2023 found that underwriting revenue for NPR member stations from 2008 through 2021 was mostly flat and fell below 2009 levels in 2021 following the COVID-19 recession, while corporate funding for the PBS News Hour ranged from 17% to 23% of total revenue from 2015 through 2022.

==== Executive Order 14290 ====
Executive Order 14290, titled "Ending Taxpayer Subsidization of Biased Media", is an executive order signed by U.S. president Donald Trump on May 1, 2025 to end federal funding for NPR (a radio network) and PBS (a television network) by the Corporation for Public Broadcasting (CPB) and by federal agencies, alleging biased news coverage in violation of the Public Broadcasting Act of 1967 (PBA) and that public funding for news programming was "not only outdated and unnecessary but corrosive to the appearance of journalistic independence" in the current U.S. media market.

CPB, PBS, and NPR executives issued press releases arguing that the executive order was unlawful under the PBA and that the organizations would explore how to continue providing programming while challenging the order. On May 27, NPR and three public radio stations sued the Trump administration for ending their federal funding under the executive order, citing it as a violation of the First Amendment. On May 30, PBS sued the Trump administration for ending their federal funding under the executive order.

Before the executive order was issued, the CPB filed a lawsuit against the Trump administration on April 28 after Trump attempted to fire three of the five members of the CPB's board of directors, while the CPB also filed a lawsuit against the Federal Emergency Management Agency (FEMA) in March 2025 for halting their funding under the Next Generation Warning System Grant Program within the Integrated Public Alert and Warning System.

FEMA released the funds on April 24. On June 8, District of Columbia U.S. District Court Judge Randolph Moss ruled against a preliminary injunction requested by the CPB in its lawsuit against the attempted director removals since the CPB changed its by-laws afterward under the District of Columbia Nonprofit Corporation Act to prevent any authority, including the President of the United States, from removing a director without a two-thirds vote of the other directors, which allowed for the directors to keep their positions. On July 15, the Trump administration filed a separate lawsuit to remove the same CPB directors.

On March 31, 2026, Judge Moss ruled for the plaintiffs, blocking the order on First Amendment grounds. In his ruling, Moss wrote, "It is difficult to conceive of clearer evidence that a government action is targeted at viewpoints that the president does not like and seeks to squelch."

=== Lawsuit with Pacific Arts ===
In the 1990s, PBS became involved in a dispute over home video licensing rights with Pacific Arts Corporation, a multimedia company owned and operated by former The Monkees guitarist Michael Nesmith.

In 1990, Pacific Arts secured a contract with PBS to distribute their back catalog of programming on VHS under the PBS Home Video banner. However, in the early 1990s, Pacific Arts and PBS went through a series of serious disagreements. Lawsuits were filed: by Nesmith and Pacific Arts against PBS for breach of contract, intentional misrepresentation, intentional concealment, negligent misrepresentation, and interference with contract; and by PBS against Nesmith and Pacific Arts for lost royalties. The lawsuits escalated in 1994 and 1995 into major litigation between the parties over these rights and payments. PBS and Nesmith and Pacific Arts vigorously prosecuted these multimillion-dollar counter-suits.

The six plaintiffs included PBS, WGBH-TV, WNET, the Ken Burns-owned American Documentaries and Radio Pioneers Film Project and the Children's Television Workshop. They sought approximately $5 million in disputed royalties, advances, guarantees and license fees for programs and the use of the PBS logo from the defendants Pacific Arts and Nesmith.

Due to the cost of the litigation, Pacific Arts was forced to cease distribution operations and suspended the use of the PBS logo on the Pacific Arts videos. Though Pacific Arts distribution system had ceased operating, the various plaintiffs were counting on capturing a personal financial guarantee Nesmith had made to PBS in the original PBS deal in 1990.

The cases went to jury trial in Federal Court in Los Angeles in February 1999. After three days of deliberation, the jury unanimously sided with Nesmith. The court awarded Pacific Arts $14,625,000 for loss of its rights library, plus $29,250,000 in punitive damages. The jury awarded $3 million to Nesmith personally, including $2 million in punitive damages for a total award to Nesmith and Pacific Arts of $48,875,000. The jury resolved the outstanding license fee issues by ordering Pacific Arts and Nesmith to pay approximately $1.2 million to American Documentaries for The Civil War, about $230,000 to WGBH-TV, and $150,000 to WNET.

Following the ruling, Nesmith expressed his personal disappointment with PBS and was quoted by BBC News as stating "It's like finding your grandmother stealing your stereo. You're happy to get your stereo back, but it's sad to find out your grandmother is a thief." The decision never went to an appeals court and the final amount paid to Pacific Arts and Nesmith was an undisclosed sum agreed to in an out-of-court settlement.

== Warning, Alert and Response Network (WARN) ==
PBS provides an alternative path for Wireless Emergency Alerts to wireless carriers through its Warning, Alert and Response Network (WARN). The alerts are transmitted through the PBS satellite network on the AMC-21 satellite to PBS stations, who then broadcast the messages over their transmitters for reception by wireless carriers at their cell sites.

The WARN network is funded by a grant through National Telecommunications and Information Administration (NTIA).

== See also ==
- American Public Media
- List of United States over-the-air television networks
- PBS America
- Public Radio International
- Public, educational, and government access (PEG)
- Television in the United States

=== Similar public broadcasting services ===
The following public broadcasters and channel have a similar focus on educational programming like PBS:

- (Canada) TVO (formerly TVOntario), Knowledge Network
- China Education Television
- (France) (Germany) Arte
- France 5
- (Germany) ARD-alpha
- (South Korea) Educational Broadcasting System
- (Sweden) Swedish Educational Broadcasting Company (UR)
