= Rudy Maxa =

American consumer travel expert (born 1949)

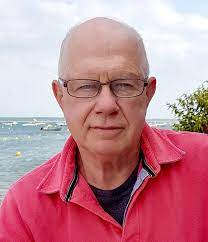
- Born: 1949 (age 76–77); Cleveland, Ohio
- Occupations: Travel expert Television personality

Rudy Maxa (born 1949) is an American consumer travel expert. He is the host and executive producer of 98 half-hour travel television episodes featuring great destinations around the world. They are broadcast on public television in the U.S.; some of them are Smart Travels: Europe with Rudy Maxa, Smart Travels: Pacific Rim with Rudy Maxa, and—since 2008—Rudy Maxa's World.

== Career ==
Maxa began his career in journalism at the Washington Post as an investigative reporter, magazine writer, and personalities columnist, after graduating from Ohio University in Athens. His reporting on a Capitol Hill sex scandal and the resulting changes in congressional rules was nominated for a Pulitzer Prize, and he received the John Hancock Award for Excellence in Business and Financial Journalism for a series of stories on an international Ponzi scheme.

He left the Post to become a senior editor at the Washingtonian (1983–92,) a magazine, and worked as the Washington bureau chief of a satirical magazine, Spy (1992–94) and did weekly commentary for the Canadian morning show Canada AM. He was also a frequent guest on political topics for The Geraldo Rivera Show, Today, Good Morning America, Sally Jessy Raphael, and other national talk shows. He was a contributing editor with National Geographic Traveler magazine for 17 years and has written for Vogue, People, Worth, Men's Life, Self, Playboy, Modern Maturity, GQ, USA Today, Travel & Leisure, Daily Mail, Penthouse, Forbes, and several airline magazines. He was a columnist and contributor to ABC.com, MSNBC.com and other websites and has been a guest on CNN, MSNBC-TV, and other national television talk shows talking about travel. He is the author of two nonfiction books, Dare To Be Great (1976) and Public Trust, Private Lust (1977).

He wrote for the Capital News a drama series on ABC and for several years hosted a Saturday-morning radio talk show on political issues for WRC in Washington, D.C.. Since 2009, he's produced and co-hosted the national syndicated travel show, "RM World Travel," which is broadcast weekly on more than 620 news/talk radio stations. Maxa attributes his desire to travel partly to the fact he grew up as a military brat. He lives in St. Paul, Minnesota. He has a daughter and a son, Alex, who runs Gillibus, a vintage bus rental service in San Francisco.
