= Rick Steves' Europe =

Travel documentary television series

- Genre: Travel documentary
- Created by: Rick Steves
- Presented by: Rick Steves
- Theme music composer: Jerry Frank
- Country of origin: United States
- Original language: English
- No. of seasons: 13
- No. of episodes: 157

Production
- Producer: Simon Griffith
- Running time: 25 minutes
- Production companies: Rick Steves' Europe, Inc. (2000–2018); Back Door Productions; Oregon Public Broadcasting; American Public Television

Original release
- Network: Syndication
- Release: September 3, 2000 – September 4, 2018

Rick Steves' Europe is an American travel documentary television program created and hosted by Rick Steves. In each episode, he travels to the continent of Europe, documenting his experiences along the way.

The show is produced by Oregon Public Broadcasting and distributed by American Public Television. It premiered on September 3, 2000; since then a total of 13 seasons and 157 episodes have been produced and broadcast in syndication.

== Episodes ==
=== Season 1 (2000) ===
No. in series	Title	Original air date
1	"Portugal's Heartland"	September 3, 2000
2	"Paris: Grand and Intimate"	September 10, 2000
3	"South England: Dovers to Land's End"	September 17, 2000
4	"Heart of England and South Wales"	September 24, 2000
5	"Caesar's Rome"	October 1, 2000
6	"Germany's Black Forest and Cologne"	October 8, 2000
7	"Scotland's Islands and Highlands"	October 15, 2000
8	"Surprising Bulgaria"	October 22, 2000
9	"Rome: Baroque After Dark"	October 29, 2000
10	"Eastern Turkey"	November 5, 2000
11	"London: Royal and Rambunctious"	November 12, 2000
12	"Slovenia and Croatia"	November 19, 2000
13	"The Best of Sicily"	November 26, 2000
14	"Travel Skills, Part One"	December 3, 2000
15	"Travel Skills, Part Two"	December 10, 2000
16	"Travel Skills, Part Three"	December 17, 2000

=== Season 2 (2002) ===
No. in series	Title	Original air date
17	"Venice: Serene, Decadent, and Still Kicking"	September 7, 2002
18	"Venice Sidetrips: The Best of Veneto"	September 14, 2002
19	"Florence: City of Art"	September 21, 2002
20	"Siena and Assisi: Italy's Grand Hill Towns"	September 28, 2002
21	"Cinque Terre: Italy's Hidden Riviera"	October 5, 2002
22	"Amsterdam and Dutch Sidetrips"	October 12, 2002
23	"Prague and the Czech Republic"	October 19, 2002
24	"Dublin and Mystical Sidetrips"	October 26, 2002
25	"South Ireland: Waterford to the Ring of Kerry"	November 2, 2002
26	"The Best of West Ireland: Dingle, Galway, and the Aran Islands"	November 9, 2002
27	"Berlin: Resilient, Reunited, and Reborn"	November 16, 2002
28	"Germany's Romantic Rhine and Rothenburg"	November 23, 2002
29	"Munich and the Foothills of the Alps"	November 30, 2002
30	"Switzerland's Jungfrau Region: Best of the Alps"	December 7, 2002

=== Season 3 (2004) ===
No. in series	Title	Original air date
31	"Majesty of Madrid"	September 4, 2004
32	"Highlights of Castille: Toledo and Salamanca"	September 11, 2004
33	"Normandy: War-Torn, Yet Full of Life"	September 18, 2004
34	"Belfast and the Best of Northern Ireland"	September 25, 2004
35	"London: Mod and Trad"	October 2, 2004
36	"Highlights of Paris: Eiffel and Monet to Crème Brulée"	October 9, 2004
37	"Belgium: Bruges and Brussels"	October 16, 2004
38	"Provence: Legendary Light, Wind, and Wine"	October 23, 2004
39	"French Riviera: Uniquely Chic"	October 30, 2004
40	"Poland Rediscovered: Krakow, Auschwitz, and Warsaw"	November 6, 2004
41	"Budapest: The Best of Hungary"	November 13, 2004
42	"Lisbon and the Algarve"	November 20, 2004
43	"Sevilla and Andalusia"	November 27, 2004

=== Season 4 (2006) ===
No. in series	Title	Original air date
44	"England's Bath and York"	October 7, 2006
45	"North Wales: Feisty and Poetic"	October 14, 2006
46	"Edinburgh"	October 21, 2006
47	"Naples and Pompeii"	October 28, 2006
48	"Italy's Amalfi Coast"	November 4, 2006
49	"Milan and Lake Como"	November 11, 2006
50	"Tuscany's Dolce Vita"	November 18, 2006
51	"Italy's Great Hill Towns"	November 25, 2006
52	"Vienna"	December 2, 2006
53	"Salzburg and Surroundings"	December 9, 2006
54	"Rick Steves' Europe: The Making Of"	December 16, 2006

=== Season 5 (2008−09) ===
No. in series	Title	Original air date
55	"Burgundy: Profoundly French"	October 4, 2008
56	"France's Dordogne"	October 11, 2008
57	"Barcelona and Catalunya"	October 18, 2008
58	"Little Europe: Five Micro-Nations"	October 25, 2008
59	"Switzerland's Great Cities"	November 1, 2008
60	"Vienna and the Danube"	November 8, 2008
61	"The Czech Republic Beyond Prague"	November 15, 2008
62	"Athens and Sidetrips"	November 22, 2008
63	"Athens and the Peloponnese"	November 29, 2008
64	"Copenhagen"	December 6, 2008
65	"Denmark Beyond Copenhagen"	December 13, 2008
66	"Istanbul"	December 20, 2008
67	"Iran: Tehran and Sidetrips"	December 27, 2008
68	"Iran's Historic Capitals"	February 28, 2009

=== Season 6 (2010) ===
No. in series	Title	Original air date
69	"The Best of Southern Spain"	October 2, 2010
70	"Croatia: Adriatic Delights"	October 9, 2010
71	"Dubrovnik and Balkan Sidetrips"	October 16, 2010
72	"The Best of Slovenia"	October 23, 2010
73	"Granada, Córdoba, and Spain's Costa del Sol"	October 30, 2010
74	"Andalucia, Gibraltar, and Tangier"	November 6, 2010
75	"Oslo"	November 13, 2010
76	"Norway West: Fjords, Mountains, and Bergen"	November 20, 2010
77	"Stockholm"	November 27, 2010
78	"Helsinki and Tallinn: Baltic Sisters"	December 4, 2010
79	"Northern Spain and the Camino de Santiago"	December 11, 2010
80	"Basque Country"	December 18, 2010

=== Season 7 (2012−13) ===
No. in series	Title	Original air date
81	"Rome: Ancient Glory"	October 6, 2012
82	"Rome: Baroque Brilliance"	October 13, 2012
83	"Rome: Back-Street Riches"	October 20, 2012
84	"Florence: Heart of the Renaissance"	October 27, 2012
85	"Florentine Delights and Tuscan Sidetrips"	November 3, 2012
86	"Paris: Regal and Intimate"	November 10, 2012
87	"Paris: Embracing Life and Art"	November 17, 2012
88	"London: Historic and Dynamic"	November 24, 2012
89	"North England's Lake District and Durham"	December 1, 2012
90	"Venice: City of Dreams"	December 8, 2012
91	"Venice's Lagoon"	December 15, 2012
92	"European Travel Skills, Part One"	December 29, 2012
93	"European Travel Skills, Part Two"	January 5, 2013
94	"European Travel Skills, Part Three"	January 12, 2013

=== Season 8 (2014) ===
No. in series	Title	Original air date
95	"Western Turkey"	October 4, 2014
96	"Central Turkey"	October 11, 2014
97	"France's Loire: Château Country"	October 18, 2014
98	"Paris Side Trips"	October 25, 2014
99	"The Best of Israel"	November 1, 2014
100	"Palestine"	November 8, 2014
101	"Italy's Riviera: Cinque Terre"	November 15, 2014
102	"Italy's Veneto: Verona, Padua, and Ravenna"	November 22, 2014
103	"Amsterdam"	November 29, 2014
104	"The Netherlands: Beyond Amsterdam"	December 6, 2014
105	"Prague"	December 13, 2014
106	"Berlin"	December 20, 2014

=== Season 9 (2016) ===
No. in series	Title	Original air date
107	"Germany's Hamburg and the Luther Trail"	October 8, 2016
108	"Germany's Dresden and Leipzig"	October 15, 2016
109	"Germany's Frankfurt and Nürnberg"	October 22, 2016
110	"Bulgaria"	October 29, 2016
111	"Romania"	November 5, 2016
112	"Assisi and Italian Country Charm"	November 12, 2016
113	"Siena and Tuscany's Wine Country"	November 19, 2016
114	"West England"	November 26, 2016
115	"Southeast England"	December 3, 2016
116	"England's Cornwall"	December 10, 2016

=== Season 10 (2018–19) ===
Season 10's filming began in September 2017, and it began airing on October 6, 2018, with an hour-long special about Mediterranean cruises that aired in February 2019.

No. in series	Title	Original air date
117	"The Story of Fascism in Europe"	September 1, 2018
118	"The Heart of England"	October 6, 2018
119	"Lisbon"	October 13, 2018
120	"Portugal's Heartland"	October 20, 2018
121	"Travel Skills: Cruising"	October 27, 2018
122	"Greek Islands: Santorini, Mykonos, and Rhodes"	November 3, 2018
123	"European Festivals I"	November 10, 2018
124	"European Festivals II"	November 17, 2018
125	"The Best of Sicily"	November 24, 2018
126	"Scotland's Islands"	November 28, 2018
127	"Sicilian Delights"	December 1, 2018
128	"Scotland's Highlands"	December 8, 2018
129	"Glasgow and Scottish Passions"	December 22, 2018
130	"Cruising the Mediterranean"	February 28, 2019

=== Season 11 (2020) ===
No. in series	Title	Original air date
131	"Austrian and Italian Alps"	October 15, 2020
132	"Swiss Alps"	October 22, 2020
133	"French Alps and Lyon"	October 29, 2020
134	"Germany's Fascist Story"	November 5, 2020
135	"Egypt's Cairo"	November 12, 2020
136	"Egypt's Nile, Alexandria, and Luxor"	November 19, 2020
137	"Ethiopia: A Development Story"	November 26, 2020
138	"Why We Travel"	December 3, 2020

=== Season 12 (2023) ===
No. in series	Title	Original air date
139	"Art of Prehistoric Europe"	October 1, 2023
140	"Art of Ancient Greece"	October 8, 2023
141	"Ancient Roman Art"	October 15, 2023
142	"Art of the Roman Empire"	October 22, 2023
143	"Art of the Early Middle Ages"	October 29, 2023
144	"Art of the High Middle Ages"	November 5, 2023
145	"Art of the Florentine Renaissance"	November 12, 2023
147	"Art of the Renaissance Beyond Florence"	November 19, 2023
148	"Baroque Art"	November 26, 2023
149	"Art of the Impressionists and Beyond"	December 3, 2023
150	"Art of the 20th Century"	December 10, 2023
151	"Art of the Neoclassical and Romantic Ages"	December 17, 2023

=== Season 13 (2025) ===
No. in series	Title	Original air date
152	"Iceland's Reykjavík and the Golden Circle"	October 4, 2025
153	"Iceland’s Ring Road"	October 11, 2025
154	"Kraków: Poland’s Historic Capital"	October 18, 2025
155	"Poland’s Warsaw and Gdańsk"	October 25, 2025
156	"Italy’s Highlights"	October 29, 2025
157	"Burgundy: A Gourmet Barge Cruise"	November 5, 2025
158	"Paris of the Parisians"	November 12, 2025
159	"Istanbul: Capital of Emperors and Sultans"	November 19, 2025
160	"Istanbul: Turkish Delights"	November 19, 2025
161	"London: A Royal Tour"	November 26, 2025
162	"London: Yesterday and Today"	December 3, 2025
