= Jacques Pépin Heart & Soul =

American TV cooking show

Jacques Pépin Heart & Soul is an American television cooking show hosted by Jacques Pépin. It aired from 2015 to 2016.

The program was a 2016 nominee for the Daytime Emmy for Outstanding Culinary Host.
