= American Public Television =

Syndicator for public TV stations

- Formerly: Eastern Educational Network (1961–1980); Interregional Program Service (1980–1992); American Program Service (1992–1999)
- Type: Nonprofit
- Industry: Public television Television syndication
- Founded: February 9, 1961; 65 years ago
- Headquarters: Boston, Massachusetts, U.S.
- Area served: Worldwide
- Website: aptonline.org

American Public Television (APT) is an American nonprofit organization and syndicator of programming for public television stations in the United States. It distributes public television programs nationwide for PBS member stations and independent educational stations, as well as the Create and World television networks.

== History ==
=== Eastern Educational Network ===
APT was founded in 1961 when it was incorporated as the Eastern Educational Network (EEN). At first, EEN was a regional cooperative that began to exchange programs between a few of its member stations. EEN was one of the first distributors of shows such as The French Chef (with Julia Child) in 1962, Mister Rogers' Neighborhood, and Washington Week in Review on a national basis.

Another first from EEN was the distribution of Newsfront, America's first live and non-commercial daily news program, starting in 1970. EEN also began importing UK's BBC and Canadian CBC productions to America in 1974, with Monty Python's Flying Circus as one of them. In 1978, the EEN started the Free Library.

In 1980, Eastern Educational Network started the Syndication Service and was renamed Interregional Program Service (IPS). IPS started the Premium Service in 1989. The first program out of this arm was the series U.S. Chronicle, a collaboration of public television stations in cooperation with The Maryland Center for Public Broadcasting, hosted by Jim Lehrer. The company gained national attention when EEN's IPS subsidiary begin distributing The Nightly Business Report when it went nationwide in 1981. The organization became American Program Service (APS) in 1992.

=== American Public Television ===
American Program Service was renamed American Public Television (APT) in April 1999. Also, with many fax requests from international outlets, an international division called APT Worldwide was started.

With the digital roll-out, APT became the distributor of a couple of multicast networks. In January 2006, APT started distributing Create. They later began distributing World on July 1, 2009.

== Programming services ==
- APT Exchange (originally the Free Library) was a service in which the company acts a clearing house for pre-funded programs that are offered free of charge to stations started in 1978. Rick Steves' Europe (starting in 2000), Nightly Business Report, and America's Test Kitchen are offered through this service.
- APT Worldwide is the corporation's international sales division even representing some A&E and Discovery programs. Amongst its network clients are Discovery, National Geographic, Japan's NHK, UK's ITV and Italy's RAI-SAT
- Premium Service provides programming for stations via outsourcing or acquisition prime time pledge drive programs particularly performance or self-help shows, which would either trigger a pledge call or a DVD purchased for the viewer's use or as a gift. One of its earliest successful shows was the first Three Tenors.
- Syndication is a service in which completed programs are acquired. Muhammad Ali: Through the Eyes of the World, purchased in 2002, was a top hit through this service along with the BBC's Battlefield Britain series.

=== Networks ===
APT also distributes two digital broadcast television networks with WGBH, WNET, and NETA:

- Create, which offers lifestyle programming, including the genres of food, travel, home & garden, arts & crafts, fitness, and living primarily from the APT library. Introduced in January 2006, Create is licensed to local public television stations, including PBS stations, and Create is also carried on cable through local agreements with local public television stations. Shows regularly carried on Create include Lidia's Kitchen, P. Allen Smith's Garden Home, Bob Ross: The Joy of Painting, Christopher Kimball's Milk Street Television, Simply Ming, and America's Test Kitchen from Cook's Illustrated.
- World Channel, is a 24-hour digital channel showing public television with non-fiction, science, nature, news, public affairs and documentaries.

== Programming ==
APT distributes more than 300 new program titles per year, including documentaries, talk shows, music performance content, dramatic and comedic series, how-to programs, children's series, and classic films. Shows currently or previously distributed by APT include, but are unlimited to, The Open Mind, Rick Steves' Europe, Live from the Artists Den, Jacques Pepin: Heart & Soul, America's Test Kitchen and its spinoff series Cook's Country, Yan Can Cook, Barbecue University with Steven Raichlen, The Big Comfy Couch, Net Cafe, Pati's Mexican Table, Samantha Brown's Places to Love, Doc Martin, Rudy Maxa's World, Sara's Weeknight Meals, and Scully: The World Show. APT distributes weeknight international news series Asia Insight and NHK Newsline from Japan's NHK, as well as the business news program Nightly Business Report.

APT has also distributed special pledge shows to public television, including programs such as Frank Sinatra: Voice of Our Time, Anne of Green Gables, Carreras Domingo Pavarotti, Celine Dion: A New Day, Mike Douglas – Moments & Memories, Leonard Cohen: Tower of Song, and Tony Bennett Duets: The Making of an American Classic.

In 2000, APT was the first company to bring a high-definition series to public television with the premiere of Smart Travels with Rudy Maxa.

On January 1, 2018, the PBS Kids 24/7 channel started airing Peep and the Big Wide World and Pocoyo until December 26, 2021.
