= List of children's programs formerly distributed by American Public Television =

The following is a list of children's programs formerly distributed to public television stations (including PBS affiliates) through American Public Television. There is a separate list for current, upcoming and unreleased programming.

Legend
^{APT WORLDWIDE}	Also on APT Worldwide
^{CREATE}	Also on Create
^{HDTV}	High-definition television
^{ITVS}	Funded and distributed by Independent Television Service
^{LPB}	Funded and distributed by Latino Public Broadcasting
^{NHK}	Funded and distributed by NHK (Japan Broadcasting Corporation)
^{VMM}	Funded and distributed by Vision Maker Media (formerly Native American Public Broadcasting Consortium and Native American Public Telecommunications)
^{WORLD}	Also on WORLD

== Children's series ==
=== Eastern Educational Network ===
Title	Premiere date	End date	Supplier(s)	Note(s)	Legend(s)	Source(s)
Mister Rogers' Neighborhood	1966	1968	WQED-TV			
The Adventures of Coslo	September 23, 1972	July 25, 1977	WTTW			
A World of Things	January 1, 1978	December 31, 1978	WCNY-TV			

=== Interregional Program Service ===
Title	Premiere date	End date	Supplier(s)	Note(s)	Legend(s)	Source(s)
Hodgepodge Lodge	February 10, 1970	September 14, 1984	Maryland Public Television			
Mulligan Stew	January 21, 1973	May 17, 1987	USDA Extension Service / Eastern Educational Network			
Jellybean Junction	September 22, 1974	September 26, 1982		(Note: One of few APT-distributed programs to be presented by PBS or NETA.)		
Magic Pages	August 22, 1976	May 28, 1990	KLVX			
The Secret City	September 2, 1985	September 1, 1989	Children's Video Associates / Maryland Public Television	(Note: Distributed by PBS from 1989 to 1993.)		

=== American Program Service ===
Title	Premiere date	End date	Supplier(s)	Note(s)	Legend(s)	Source(s)
The Letter People	April 4, 1974	April 8, 1994	KETC-TV			
Mundo Real	November 7, 1975	October 24, 1993	Connecticut Public Television	(Note: One of few APT-distributed programs to be presented by PBS.)		
Dragons, Wagons & Wax	September 17, 1977	1996	WCET			
Size Small	December 4, 1982	August 31, 1996				
The Pappenheimers	September 1, 1983	August 31, 1994	KOPB-TV			
Captain Kangaroo	September 1, 1986	August 31, 1992	Interregional Program Service			
Tomes & Talismans	September 1, 1986	August 31, 1996	Mississippi Public Broadcasting			
Storylords	September 7, 1986	May 22, 1998	PBS Wisconsin			
The Wind in the Willows	September 19, 1990	September 18, 1993	Cosgrove Hall Films; Thames Television; APS			
The Spacewatch Club	October 5, 1991	July 31, 1994	Spacewatch Inc. / Houston Public Television			
You Can Choose!	May 24, 1993	August 25, 1995	Live Wire Media / APS			
Gerbert	June 1, 1993	August 31, 1997	Home Sweet Home Educational Media Co. / APS			
Whirligig!	July 2, 1993	February 12, 1995				
Shamu TV	September 17, 1993	September 16, 1996	SeaWorld Parks & Entertainment / APS			
Pappyland	February 13, 1994	February 13, 1997	Craftsman & Scribes Creative Workshop Inc. / WCNY	(Note: Season 1 only.) (Note: Seasons 2-6 and A Pappyland Christmas (2-part special) were distributed by NETA (aka National Educational Telecommunications Association).)		
Get Real!	March 1, 1995	March 31, 1997	PBS Wisconsin			
The Shelly T. Turtle Show	June 23, 1995	January 30, 1998	UAV Corporation; The Shelly Turtle Group, LLC. APS			
Images of Nature	August 30, 1995	August 8, 1998		(Note: Exclusively broadcast on KUED and KNPB.)		
Willi Wuhlmouse Takes a Trip Around the World	September 10, 1995	September 9, 1997	Victory Children / APS			
The Swamp Critters of Lost Lagoon	November 4, 1995	December 27, 1997	WEDU			
Bloopy's Buddies	January 6, 1996	January 31, 1998	KPBS			
Animal Tales	July 7, 1996	July 6, 1998	KCET/Los Angeles			
Dooley	September 1, 1996	August 31, 1997	Scripps Howard Broadcasting / WCET	(Note: aka The Dooley Show.)		
Salty's Lighthouse	December 6, 1997	1998	Sunbow Entertainment / APS			

=== American Public Television ===
Title	Premiere date	End date	Supplier(s)	Note(s)	Legend(s)	Source(s)
Harriet's Magic Hats	September 27, 1983	November 13, 1999				
Alles Gute	September 10, 1989	July 31, 1999				
The Story of Read-Alee Deed-Alee	October 2, 1993	October 1, 1999				
Jack Houston's ImagineLand	January 5, 1994	July 31, 2000				
The Kidsongs Television Show	April 4, 1994	June 30, 2001	WTTW			
The Adventures of Dudley the Dragon	September 18, 1994	September 5, 1999	WEDU			
Big Changes, Big Choices	October 27, 1994	October 26, 2000	Live Wire Media / APS			
The Huggabug Club	January 2, 1995	July 28, 2000	WEDU			
The Big Comfy Couch	January 9, 1995	April 30, 2009	Hollywood Ventures Corporation / WITF (1995–2002); Nashville Public Television (2002–09); Tadpole Kids (2002–05); Amity Entertainment (2005–09)			
Preschool Power!	March 25, 1995	December 31, 1999	Concept Associates, Inc. / Maryland Public Television			
The Reppies	April 1, 1996	April 30, 1999	WEDU			
Cave Kids	September 29, 1996	September 12, 1999	Turner Entertainment Co. (1996); Warner Bros. Television (1996–99); APS			
Great Minds of Business	August 3, 1997	January 7, 2000				
Zoobilee Zoo	September 1, 1997	February 6, 2000	SFM Entertainment / WQED-TV	(Note: Distributed by PBS from 1988 to 1992.)		
Groundling Marsh	September 1, 1997	December 31, 2000	Portfolio Entertainment / APS			
The Slow Norris	November 9, 1997	August 29, 2000	Hollywood Ventures Corporation / APT			
Backyard Safari	November 9, 1997	September 28, 1999	Lancit Media Productions / APS American Weekend			
Skinnamarink TV	May 9, 1998	September 5, 1999				
Salsa	June 1, 1998	May 31, 2000	Hollywood Ventures Corporation / Georgia Public Broadcasting			
Reading Allowed	June 7, 1998	August 29, 2001		(Note: Exclusively broadcast on PBS affiliates in South Carolina and North Carolina.)		
Someday School	June 21, 1998	May 31, 2001	Hollywood Ventures Corporation / APT			
The Adventures of Elmer & Friends	September 1, 1998	August 31, 1999	Featherwind Productions / WIPB			
Once Upon a Tree	October 5, 1998	October 4, 2000	Tremendous Productions Inc. / APS			
Adventures with Kanga Roddy	April 4, 1999	March 4, 2001	American Champion Entertainment / KTEH/San Jose			
Wish*a*roo Park	June 6, 1999	June 5, 2001	WVIZ			
Hello Mrs. Cherrywinkle	July 4, 1999	July 3, 2001	Time Life Kids / APT			
Popular Mechanics for Kids	January 1, 2000	December 31, 2000	Hearst Entertainment / APT			
The Dooley and Pals Show	April 2, 2000	April 1, 2003	SCETV			
Alef...Bet...Blast-Off!	September 3, 2000	September 2, 2009	Jewish Television Network / APT		^{APT WORLDWIDE}	
Brian Jacques' Redwall	April 1, 2001	April 6, 2006	Nelvana / APT			
The Toy Castle	April 6, 2003	April 5, 2010	Sound Venture International / Detroit Public Television			
Real Wheels	September 7, 2003	September 6, 2010	KSPS			
Mustard Pancakes	July 1, 2005	April 7, 2008	Oregon Public Broadcasting			
Ribert and Robert's Wonderworld	September 4, 2005	September 6, 2020	Deos Animation Studios / APT			
Kid Fitness	September 4, 2005	March 31, 2010	Pro Image Studios / WQED-TV			
Danger Rangers	September 5, 2005	December 26, 2006	Educational Adventures LLC. (2005–06); Mighty Kids Media (2006); APT			
The Zula Patrol	September 10, 2005	August 31, 2022	UNC-TV			
My Bedbugs	October 2, 2005	October 1, 2009	Greenestuff, Inc. / Detroit Public Television			
Signing Time!	January 1, 2006	September 30, 2008	Two Little Hands Productions / APT	(Note: Distributed by NETA (aka National Educational Telecommunications Association) from 2010 to 2016.)		
The Saddle Club	September 3, 2006	September 6, 2012	Connecticut Public Television			
Sheira & Loli's Dittydoodle Works	September 3, 2006	May 5, 2010	WLIW			
SeeMore's Playhouse	September 10, 2006	November 2, 2009	Safety 4 Kids, LLC; Connecticut Public Television (2006–07); Oregon Public Broadcasting (2007–09)			
Peep and the Big Wide World	April 1, 2007	December 31, 2009	WGBH-TV	(Note: Distributed by PBS Kids from 2018 to 2021.)		
Peep and the Big Wide World	January 4, 2010	January 3, 2018	WGBH-TV	(Note: Distributed by PBS Kids from 2018 to 2021.)		
Jim Knox's Wild Zoofari	September 2, 2007	September 1, 2010	Jim Knox's Wild Zoofari / Rhode Island PBS			
Raggs	February 4, 2008	February 1, 2014	KQED-TV			
Wunderkind Little Amadeus	September 7, 2008	September 6, 2020	Little Amadeus Realisierungs / APT			
Big Green Rabbit	October 5, 2008	October 4, 2011	Big Green Company, Inc. / Rocky Mountain PBS			
Anne of Green Gables: The Animated Series	April 5, 2010	April 4, 2015	APT	(Note: Distributed by PBS Kids from 2001 to 2005.)		
Wild Animal Baby Explorers	October 1, 2010	January 7, 2014	WETA	(Note: Planned to be nature & science genre.)		
Bali	September 1, 2013	August 31, 2021	WGBH-TV			
Space Racers	May 2, 2014	October 31, 2016	Maryland Public Television			
Thomas Edison's Secret Lab	September 7, 2015	September 6, 2020	Georgia Public Broadcasting			
Bug Bites	January 4, 2016	January 3, 2019	APT			
Ruby's Studio	January 7, 2016	January 6, 2022	The Mother Company / WQED-TV			
Mack & Moxy	February 5, 2016	February 16, 2020	Georgia Public Broadcasting			
Young Voices for the Planet	April 8, 2016	April 7, 2019	Children's Environmental Literacy Foundation / APT			
Kid Stew	May 1, 2018	May 3, 2026	WPBT			

== Children's specials ==
=== Interregional Program Service ===
Title	Premiere date	End date	Supplier(s)	Note(s)	Legend(s)	Source(s)
Reach for the Sun	March 8, 1981	March 7, 1984	Abramowitz Productions / KCET/Los Angeles			

=== American Program Service ===
Title	Premiere date	End date	Supplier(s)	Note(s)	Legend(s)	Source(s)
Zillions TV: Kid's Guide to Best Toys and Games	November 24, 1993	November 23, 1994	Consumer Reports Television / Connecticut Public Television	(Note: Originally titled Zillions.) (Note: Failed pilot.)		
Fabletown	July 31, 1994	July 30, 1997				
The Kidsongs Holiday Special	November 25, 1994	December 31, 1998	WTTW			
Kids Love Trains	November 27, 1994	December 31, 1996	Atlas Video / APS			
Prince Cinders	November 27, 1994	December 31, 1996	Longreturn; Animation City; APS			
Road Construction Ahead	December 1, 1994	November 30, 1996	Fred Levine Productions / APS			
Children's Computer Animation Special	November 22, 1996	December 31, 1997	Miramar Productions / APS			
The Reppies: Holiday Special	December 1, 1996	December 31, 1998	WEDU			

=== American Public Television ===
Title	Premiere date	End date	Supplier(s)	Note(s)	Legend(s)	Source(s)
The Adventures of Tiller and Friends	September 4, 1994	September 3, 2000	Better Entertainment / APS			
Bernard and the Genie	December 1, 1995	December 31, 1997	BBC Worldwide Ltd / APT	(Note: Originally holiday genre.)		
Bernard and the Genie	November 24, 2002	March 31, 2004	BBC Worldwide Ltd / APT	(Note: Originally holiday genre.)		
Davy Jones' Locker	November 1, 1997	January 1, 2002	Children's Video Theater; Double Eagle Entertainment; Jacoby Entertainment Ltd. APT			
Davy Jones' Locker	November 1, 2018	October 31, 2020	Children's Video Theater; Double Eagle Entertainment; Jacoby Entertainment Ltd. APT			
The Big Comfy Couch: Lots to Doodle Do	November 15, 1998	March 31, 2000	Hollywood Ventures Corporation / WITF			
Barney's Great Adventure	October 1, 2000	March 31, 2001	Studios USA / APT			
Brian Jacques' The Redwall Movie	November 18, 2001	November 17, 2005	Nelvana / APT			
VeggieTales: The Star of Christmas	November 24, 2002	December 31, 2002	Big Idea Entertainment / APT			
VeggieTales: The Star of Christmas	November 27, 2005	December 31, 2006	Big Idea Entertainment / APT			
Kid Concoctions	June 1, 2003	May 31, 2006	UNC-TV			
BrainFood	August 31, 2003	August 30, 2009	WQED-TV			
A Very Wompkee Christmas	November 22, 2003	November 21, 2004	Wompkee LLC / APT			
Kids, Cash & Common Sense	February 1, 2004	January 31, 2016	KVIE			
Baby Animals and Their Fuzzy Friends	February 28, 2004	February 27, 2007	KQED-TV			
VeggieTales: Duke and the Great Pie War	April 1, 2005	September 30, 2006	Big Idea Entertainment / APT			
Kid Concoctions 2	November 20, 2005	November 19, 2008	UNC-TV			
Chanukah Stories	December 1, 2005	November 30, 2013	Jewish Television Network / APT			
Cricket on the Hearth	November 19, 2006	November 18, 2012	Classic Media / APT			
Signing Time! Special Edition: Leah's Farm & The Great Outdoors	February 17, 2007	September 30, 2008	Two Little Hands Productions / APT			
Greatest Kid Concoctions	November 18, 2007	November 17, 2009	Time Life / KPBS			
Heidi 4 Paws: A Furry Tale	November 23, 2008	December 31, 2010	WTTW			
Science Mission 101	February 1, 2010	January 31, 2022	WQED-TV			
Scientastic!	April 2, 2014	April 1, 2017	WQED-TV			
Lost Treasure Hunt	October 1, 2014	March 31, 2021	KRCB			

== See also ==
- List of programs formerly distributed by American Public Television
- List of PBS member stations
- List of programs broadcast by PBS
- List of programs broadcast by PBS Kids
- List of programs broadcast by Create
- List of worldwide programs distributed by American Public Television
