= List of programs broadcast by PBS Kids =

This is a list of programs currently or formerly broadcast on public television by PBS Kids on local PBS stations and the 24/7 channel in the United States.

== Current programming ==
- ^{1} Co-distributed by Amazon Prime Video, the official streaming partner for PBS Kids programming
- ^{2} Co-distributed on the PBS Retro streaming channel

=== Original programming ===
Title	Premiere date	Current season	Source(s)
Mister Rogers' Neighborhood^{1} ^{2}	February 19, 1968	Reruns	(Note: National runs ended when spinoff series Daniel Tiger's Neighborhood began airing on September 3, 2012, but reruns of select episodes have since returned as of June 10, 2017 (PBS) and temporarily October 8, 2022 through February 5, 2023 (PBS Kids 24/7).) (Note: Reruns began streaming on the PBS Retro channel on April 23, 2024.)
Sesame Street	November 10, 1969	56	(Note: Sesame Street was notably absent from PBS Kids 24/7 until the channel relaunched on January 16, 2017, due to conflicting cable broadcast rights with Noggin and Children's Television Workshop. Premieres moved to HBO in 2016 and HBO Max in 2020, but Sesame Street has aired consistently on public television in some capacity since its original debut. As of 2025, new episodes premiere on PBS and Netflix concurrently.)
Arthur^{1}	October 7, 1996	Reruns	
Cyberchase^{1}	January 21, 2002	16	
Super Why!^{1}	September 3, 2007	Reruns	(Note: National runs on PBS ended on July 12, 2019. Reruns continue on select local PBS stations with specials airing periodically on PBS Kids 24/7.)
WordGirl^{1}	September 3, 2007	Reruns	(Note: National runs on PBS ended on June 2, 2017. Reruns continue on select local PBS stations with specials airing periodically on PBS Kids 24/7.)
Dinosaur Train^{1}	September 7, 2009	Reruns	(Note: National runs on PBS ended on February 4, 2024. Reruns continue on select local PBS stations and PBS Kids 24/7.)
Wild Kratts^{1}	January 3, 2011	7	
Daniel Tiger's Neighborhood^{1}	September 3, 2012	7	
Peg + Cat^{1}	October 7, 2013	Reruns	(Note: National runs on PBS ended on October 1, 2021 with specials airing periodically through December 23, 2022. Reruns continue on select local PBS stations and PBS Kids 24/7.)
Odd Squad^{1}	November 26, 2014	5	
Nature Cat^{1}	November 25, 2015	Reruns	(Note: National runs on PBS ended on July 4, 2025. Reruns continue on select local PBS stations and PBS Kids 24/7.)
Ready Jet Go!^{1}	February 15, 2016	Reruns	(Note: National runs on PBS ended on February 3, 2023. Reruns continue on select local PBS stations and PBS Kids 24/7.)
Pinkalicious & Peterrific^{1}	February 19, 2018	Reruns	(Note: National runs on PBS ended on February 1, 2026. Reruns continue on select local PBS stations and PBS Kids 24/7.)
Let's Go Luna!^{1}	November 21, 2018	Reruns	(Note: National runs on PBS ended on February 4, 2024. Reruns continue on select local PBS stations and PBS Kids 24/7.)
Molly of Denali^{1}	July 15, 2019	4	
Xavier Riddle and the Secret Museum^{1}	November 11, 2019	2	
Clifford the Big Red Dog (2019)	December 7, 2019	Reruns	(Note: National runs on PBS ended on September 30, 2022. Reruns continue on select local PBS stations and PBS Kids 24/7.)
Hero Elementary^{1}	June 1, 2020	Reruns	(Note: National runs on PBS ended on February 2, 2024. Reruns continue on select local PBS stations and PBS Kids 24/7.)
Elinor Wonders Why^{1}	September 7, 2020	2	
Donkey Hodie^{1}	May 3, 2021	3	
Alma's Way^{1}	October 4, 2021	3	
Rosie's Rules^{1}	October 3, 2022	2	
Work It Out Wombats!^{1}	February 6, 2023	2	
Lyla in the Loop^{1}	February 5, 2024	1	
Milo^{1}	October 1, 2024	1	(Note: Exclusive to PBS Kids 24/7.) (Note: Milo was first available on PBS Kids streaming platforms and Amazon Prime Video starting on May 13, 2024.)
Carl the Collector^{1}	November 14, 2024	1	
Weather Hunters^{1}	September 8, 2025	1	
Phoebe & Jay^{1}	February 2, 2026	1	
Super Why's Comic Book Adventures^{1}	October 5, 2026	1	

==== Local reruns ====
The following programs are currently airing on select local PBS stations only. They are no longer distributed nationally, but are still available for local stations to air independently.

Title	Premiere date	National run end date	Source(s)
Clifford the Big Red Dog (2000)	September 4, 2000	October 2, 2022	(Note: National runs ended on May 30, 2014 (PBS) and October 2, 2022 (PBS Kids 24/7). Reruns continue on select local PBS stations only.)
Maya & Miguel	October 11, 2004	December 31, 2010	(Note: National runs ended on December 31, 2010. Reruns continue on select local PBS stations only.)
SciGirls^{1}	February 11, 2010	June 23, 2023	(Note: Broadcasts are exclusive to select local PBS stations.)

=== Programming from American Public Television ===
The following programs are distributed by American Public Television, not PBS itself. These programs are broadcast by select local PBS stations.

Title	Premiere date	Current season	Source(s)
Biz Kid$	January 6, 2008	Reruns	
Roey's Paintbox	February 4, 2015	Reruns	
Kid Stew	May 1, 2018	Reruns	
Albie's Elevator	September 4, 2023	2	
The Infinite Art Hunt	September 4, 2023	1	
Mia & Codie	January 2, 2025	2	
Skillsville	March 3, 2025	Reruns	(Note: Skillsville aired from March 3, 2025, through January 31, 2026 on PBS Kids; Reruns are currently distributed to local PBS stations by American Public Television as of February 1, 2026.)
Vegesaurs	April 1, 2025	1	

=== Programming from NETA ===
The following programs are distributed by National Educational Telecommunications Association, not PBS itself. These programs are broadcast by select local PBS stations.

Title	Premiere date	Current season	Source(s)
Curious Crew	2017	10	
Into the Outdoors	June 3, 2020	4	
Let's Learn	December 14, 2020	4	
DIY Science Time	May 31, 2021	3	
Camp TV	June 16, 2021	Reruns	
The Reading League's Reading Buddies	2022	3	
Wimee's Words	April 1, 2022	2	
Wordsville^{1}	January 10, 2025	1	

=== Interstitial programming ===
The following interstitials run for a minute and are usually shown at the start or end of a traditional, full-form program.

Title	Premiere date	Source(s)
PBS Kids Rocks!	September 6, 2010	(Note: Originally known as DJ Hooper until 2015.)
You Can Be Anything!	2016	
You, Me, and Community	October 1, 2017	
The Really Really Awesome Activity Challenge	October 1, 2017	
Get Moving!	August 3, 2020	

=== Short-form programming ===
Title	Premiere date	Source(s)
Oh Noah!	April 11, 2011	(Note: Originally known as Noah Comprende.)
Elinor Wonders Why's That's So Interesting!^{1}	May 3, 2021	
Through the Woods^{1}	June 4, 2021	
Jelly, Ben & Pogo	October 4, 2021	
Molly of Denali: The Big Gathering^{1}	November 1, 2022	
City Island^{1}	December 26, 2022	
What Can You Become?	March 3, 2023	
Super Why's Comic Book Adventures^{1}	October 18, 2023	
Together We Can	July 3, 2024	
Acoustic Rooster: Jazzy Jams	April 11, 2025	
Count On June Bug!	March 2, 2026	

=== Blocks ===
Title	Premiere date	Source(s)
PBS Kids Family Night	April 21, 2017	

== Upcoming programming ==
=== Original programming ===
Title	Premiere date	Source(s)
Carnival of the Animals	November 16, 2026	
Clifford the Big Red Dog (2027)	2027	

=== Acquired programming ===
Title	Premiere date	Source(s)
Piripenguins	TBA	

== Former programming ==
- ^{1} Co-distributed by Amazon Prime Video, the official streaming partner for PBS Kids programming
- ^{2} Co-distributed by Roku on the PBS Retro streaming channel

=== PTV ===
For a list of earlier children’s programming on PBS, prior to the PTV block (such as Zoom or 3-2-1 Contact), see List of programs broadcast by PBS.

==== Original programming ====
Title	Premiere date	End date	Source(s)
Square One Television	January 26, 1987	October 7, 1994	
Shining Time Station	January 29, 1989	June 11, 1998	
Where in the World is Carmen Sandiego?	September 30, 1991	October 4, 1996	
Lamb Chop's Play-Along	January 13, 1992	August 29, 1997	
Ghostwriter	October 4, 1992	September 5, 1999	
Storytime	October 11, 1992	September 5, 1999	(Note: National run began on June 6, 1994.)
The Magic School Bus	September 10, 1994	September 25, 1998	
Bill Nye the Science Guy	October 10, 1994	September 3, 1999	
Katie and Orbie	October 14, 1995	August 31, 1997	
Where in Time is Carmen Sandiego?	October 7, 1996	September 25, 1998	
The Charlie Horse Music Pizza	January 5, 1998	September 3, 1999	

==== Programming from American Program Service ====
Title	Premiere date	End date	Source(s)
The Letter People	April 4, 1974	April 8, 1994	
Mundo Real	November 7, 1975	October 24, 1993	
Dragons, Wagons & Wax	September 17, 1977	1996	
Size Small	December 4, 1982	August 31, 1996	
The Pappenheimers	September 1, 1983	August 31, 1994	
The Secret City	September 2, 1985	March 14, 1993	
A Musical Encounter	September 7, 1985	1995	
Captain Kangaroo	September 1, 1986	August 31, 1993	
Tomes & Talismans	September 1, 1986	August 31, 1996	
Storylords	September 7, 1986	1998	
Saludos	May 24, 1987	April 27, 1997	
The Wind in the Willows	September 19, 1990	September 18, 1993	
Math Vantage	February 5, 1993	1998	
You Can Choose!	May 24, 1993	December 15, 1993	
Gerbert	June 1, 1993	August 31, 1997	
Whirligig!	July 2, 1993	February 12, 1995	
Shamu TV	September 17, 1993	September 16, 1996	
Pappyland	February 13, 1994	September 3, 1999	
The Shelly T. Turtle Show	June 23, 1995	January 30, 1998	
The Swamp Critters of Lost Lagoon	November 4, 1995	December 27, 1997	
Get Real!	March 1, 1995	March 31, 1997	
Bloopy's Buddies	January 6, 1996	January 31, 1998	
Animal Tales	July 1, 1996	June 30, 1998	
Follow the Money	July 6, 1997	December 31, 1997	
Salty's Lighthouse	December 6, 1997	1998	

==== Blocks ====
Block title	Launch date	End date	Source(s)
The Game	October 7, 1996	September 5, 1999	

=== PBS Kids ===
==== Original programming ====
Title	Premiere date	End date	Source(s)
Reading Rainbow^{1} ^{2}	July 11, 1983	August 28, 2009	
Barney & Friends	April 6, 1992	November 14, 2015	(Note: Reruns continued through August 31, 2016 on select local PBS stations.)
The Puzzle Place	January 16, 1995	March 31, 2000	
Plaza Sesamo	April 3, 1995	January 4, 2010	(Note: Broadcasts were exclusive to select local PBS stations.)
Wishbone	October 9, 1995	September 6, 2009	(Note: National run ended September 2, 2001, and resumed June 2, 2007 through September 6, 2009. Reruns continued through August 31, 2014 on select local PBS stations.)
Kratts' Creatures^{1} ^{2}	June 3, 1996	June 9, 2000	
Adventures from the Book of Virtues	September 2, 1996	September 26, 2005	
Tots TV	October 7, 1996	September 1, 2002	
Theodore Tugboat	October 20, 1996	September 1, 2002	
Wimzie's House	September 1, 1997	September 2, 2001	
Teletubbies	April 6, 1998	August 29, 2008	(Note: Premieres moved to Nickelodeon and Nick Jr. in 2015.)
Noddy	August 31, 1998	September 1, 2002	(Note: National runs on PBS Kids 24/7 ended June 10, 2001.)
Zoom^{2}	January 4, 1999	September 2, 2007	(Note: Reruns began streaming on the PBS Retro channel on August 8, 2026.)
Zoboomafoo^{1} ^{2}	January 25, 1999	February 1, 2009	(Note: Reruns continued through December 23, 2017 on select local PBS stations.)
Dragon Tales	September 6, 1999	August 31, 2010	
Between the Lions	April 3, 2000	August 31, 2011	
Caillou^{1}	September 4, 2000	December 27, 2020	(Note: National runs ended on November 13, 2015 (PBS) and December 27, 2020 (PBS Kids 24/7). Reruns continued through December 31, 2020 on select local PBS stations.)
Corduroy	September 30, 2000	October 28, 2001	
Elliot Moose	September 30, 2000	October 28, 2001	
Timothy Goes to School	September 30, 2000	September 5, 2004	
Marvin the Tap-Dancing Horse	September 30, 2000	September 5, 2004	
Seven Little Monsters	September 30, 2000	September 5, 2004	(Note: Seven Little Monsters was part of the Bookworm Bunch block from September 30, 2000 through September 5, 2004; meanwhile, it was aired in the same half-hour timeslot alongside The Berenstain Bears from January 6 through September 12, 2003.)
George Shrinks	September 30, 2000	September 2, 2007	(Note: George Shrinks was part of the Bookworm Bunch block from September 30, 2000 through September 5, 2004; meanwhile, it was aired in its own half-hour timeslot from January 6, 2003 through September 2, 2007. Reruns continued through August 2008 on select local PBS stations.)
Jay Jay the Jet Plane	June 11, 2001	May 31, 2009	(Note: Reruns continued through June 26, 2009 on select local PBS stations.)
Anne of Green Gables: The Animated Series	September 2, 2001	September 30, 2015	(Note: Anne of Green Gables: The Animated Series aired from September 2, 2001 through October 10, 2004 (PBS Kids 24/7) and through September 4, 2005 (PBS); later reruns were distributed to local PBS stations by American Public Television from April 5, 2010 through September 30, 2015.)
Sagwa, the Chinese Siamese Cat	September 3, 2001	February 1, 2009	(Note: Reruns continued through August 30, 2009 on select local PBS stations.)
DragonflyTV	January 19, 2002	September 6, 2009	(Note: Reruns continued through May 29, 2019 on select local PBS stations.)
Angelina Ballerina^{1} ^{2}	June 1, 2002	August 29, 2009	(Note: Reruns began streaming on the PBS Retro channel on October 31, 2025.)
Liberty's Kids	September 2, 2002	October 10, 2004	
The Berenstain Bears^{1} ^{2}	January 6, 2003	February 1, 2009	(Note: National runs ended on February 1, 2009 (PBS) and September 26, 2005 (PBS Kids 24/7). Reruns continued through September 8, 2025 on select local PBS stations.)
Clifford's Puppy Days	September 1, 2003	April 23, 2022	(Note: National runs ended on September 2, 2007 (PBS) with specials airing periodically through February 14, 2014 (PBS) and April 23, 2022 (PBS Kids 24/7).)
Jakers! The Adventures of Piggley Winks^{1} ^{2}	September 7, 2003	August 31, 2008	(Note: Reruns began streaming on the PBS Retro channel on October 17, 2025.)
Boohbah	January 19, 2004	August 31, 2008	
Thomas & Friends^{2}	September 5, 2004	December 31, 2017	(Note: Premieres moved to Nickelodeon and Nick Jr. in 2017.)
Postcards from Buster^{1}	October 11, 2004	February 24, 2012	
Bob the Builder	January 1, 2005	November 6, 2015	(Note: After originally debuting on Nick Jr. in the United States on January 15, 2001, Bob the Builder was broadcast on PBS Kids from January 1, 2005 through November 6, 2015, when the series was replaced by the 2015 reboot series.)
Make Way for Noddy	September 10, 2005	September 6, 2009	
It's a Big Big World^{1}	January 2, 2006	April 30, 2010	
Fetch! with Ruff Ruffman^{1}	May 29, 2006	November 20, 2018	(Note: First run ended September 2, 2012, with reruns continuing through August 31, 2014 on select local PBS stations. Reruns resumed January 16, 2017 through November 20, 2018 exclusively on PBS Kids 24/7.)
Franny's Feet	July 8, 2006	September 6, 2009	(Note: Reruns continued through November 25, 2012 on select local PBS stations.)
Curious George	September 4, 2006	September 30, 2026	(Note: Due to conflicting streaming rights with NBCUniversal and Hulu, Curious George was notably absent from PBS Kids 24/7 until October 5, 2020. Premieres moved to Peacock in 2020, but Curious George aired consistently on public television in some capacity since its original debut.) (Note: National runs ended on September 30, 2024 (PBS) and September 30, 2026 (PBS Kids 24/7).)
Design Squad^{1}	February 21, 2007	March 20, 2011	
Peep and the Big Wide World^{1}	April 1, 2007	December 26, 2021	(Note: After originally debuting on Discovery Kids and TLC on April 12, 2004, Peep and the Big Wide World began airing locally on WGBH on August 1, 2004. It was later distributed to local PBS stations by American Public Television from April 1, 2007 through January 3, 2018; later reruns aired on PBS Kids 24/7 from January 1, 2018 through December 26, 2021.)
WordWorld^{1}	September 3, 2007	October 2, 2022	(Note: Reruns continued through July 30, 2023 on select local PBS stations.)
Mama Mirabelle's Home Movies	September 8, 2007	September 6, 2009	(Note: Reruns continued through January 2, 2011 on select local PBS stations.)
Animalia	January 5, 2008	September 6, 2009	
Betsy's Kindergarten Adventures	January 13, 2008	May 31, 2009	(Note: Reruns continued through October 6, 2013 on select local PBS stations.)
Martha Speaks^{1} ^{2}	September 1, 2008	October 2, 2022	(Note: Reruns continued through November 17, 2025 on select local PBS stations.) (Note: Reruns began streaming on the PBS Retro channel on July 11, 2026.)
Sid the Science Kid^{1}	September 1, 2008	June 25, 2023	(Note: National runs ended on November 18, 2018 (PBS) and June 25, 2023 (PBS Kids 24/7).)
Lomax, the Hound of Music	October 11, 2008	December 29, 2008	
The Electric Company (2009)	January 19, 2009	August 31, 2014	
Angelina Ballerina: The Next Steps^{1} ^{2}	September 5, 2009	November 14, 2015	(Note: Reruns continued through January 31, 2016 on select local PBS stations.) (Note: Reruns began streaming on the PBS Retro channel on October 10, 2025.)
The Cat in the Hat Knows a Lot About That!	September 6, 2010	March 1, 2026	(Note: National runs ended on October 1, 2021 (PBS) and March 1, 2026 (PBS Kids 24/7), with specials airing periodically through December 25, 2025. Reruns continued through August 31, 2026 on select local PBS stations.)
Bob the Builder (2015)	November 7, 2015	November 20, 2018	
Splash and Bubbles^{1}	November 23, 2016	October 2, 2022	(Note: Reruns continued through November 27, 2022 on select local PBS stations.)
Esme & Roy	August 30, 2019	June 27, 2021	
The Not-Too-Late Show with Elmo	February 10, 2023	May 10, 2024	(Note: Exclusive to PBS Kids 24/7.)
Mecha Builders	May 13, 2024	April 30, 2025	

==== Acquired programming ====
Title	Premiere date	End date	Source(s)
Newton's Apple	October 15, 1983	October 31, 1999	
Mark Kistler's Imagination Station	October 14, 1991	July 10, 1998	(Note: Reboot series began airing in 2009.)
The Eddie Files	1995	2000	
Ricky's Room	1999	2000	
Mary Lou's Flip Flop Shop	August 25, 2002	September 22, 2002	(Note: Reruns aired on the PBS HD Channel from 2004 to 2007.)
MythQuest	2002	2004	
Nanalan'	July 2006	2013	
Miffy and Friends	2007	2009	(Note: Syndicated to public television stations by WLIW.)
Shalom Sesame	October 5, 2010	October 11, 2011	

==== Programming from American Public Television ====
The following programs were distributed by American Public Television, not PBS itself. These programs were broadcast by select local PBS stations.

Title	Premiere date	End date	Source(s)
Harriet's Magic Hats	September 27, 1983	November 13, 1999	
Alles Gute	September 10, 1989	July 31, 1999	
Practical Parenting	November 3, 1989	January 14, 2001	
The Story of Read-Alee Deed-Alee	October 2, 1993	October 1, 1999	
Beyond the Front Page	November 20, 1993	November 19, 2000	
Jack Houston's ImagineLand	January 5, 1994	July 31, 2000	
Kidsongs	April 4, 1994	June 30, 2001	
The Adventures of Dudley the Dragon	September 18, 1994	September 5, 1999	
Big Changes, Big Choices	October 27, 1994	October 26, 2000	
The Huggabug Club	January 2, 1995	July 28, 2000	
The Big Comfy Couch	January 9, 1995	April 30, 2009	
Preschool Power!	March 25, 1995	December 31, 1999	
The Reppies	April 1, 1996	April 30, 1999	
Crossroads Café	September 6, 1996	2000	
Cave Kids	September 29, 1996	September 12, 1999	
Great Minds of Business	August 3, 1997	January 7, 2000	
Zoobilee Zoo	September 1, 1997	February 6, 2000	
Groundling Marsh	September 1, 1997	December 31, 2000	
The Slow Norris	November 9, 1997	August 29, 2000	
Backyard Safari	November 9, 1997	September 28, 1999	
Mikhail Baryshnikov's Stories from My Childhood	March 15, 1998	December 31, 2001	
Skinnamarink TV	May 9, 1998	September 5, 1999	
Salsa	June 1, 1998	May 31, 2000	
Reading Allowed	June 7, 1998	August 29, 2001	
Someday School	June 21, 1998	May 31, 2001	
The Adventures of Elmer & Friends	September 1, 1998	August 31, 1999	
Once Upon a Tree	October 5, 1998	October 4, 2000	
Adventures with Kanga Roddy	April 4, 1999	March 4, 2001	
Wish*a*roo Park	June 6, 1999	June 5, 2001	
Hello Mrs. Cherrywinkle	July 4, 1999	July 3, 2001	
Popular Mechanics for Kids	January 1, 2000	December 31, 2000	
The Dooley and Pals Show	April 2, 2000	April 1, 2003	
Alef...Bet...Blast-Off!	September 3, 2000	September 2, 2009	
Brian Jacques' Redwall	April 1, 2001	April 6, 2006	
The Toy Castle	April 6, 2003	April 5, 2010	
Real Wheels	September 7, 2003	September 6, 2010	
Mustard Pancakes	July 1, 2005	April 7, 2008	
Ribert and Robert's Wonderworld	September 4, 2005	September 6, 2020	
Kid Fitness	September 4, 2005	March 31, 2010	
Danger Rangers	September 5, 2005	December 26, 2006	
The Zula Patrol	September 10, 2005	August 31, 2022	
My Bedbugs	October 2, 2005	October 1, 2009	
Signing Time!	January 1, 2006	September 30, 2008	
The Saddle Club	September 3, 2006	September 6, 2012	
Sheira & Loli's Dittydoodle Works	September 3, 2006	May 5, 2010	
SeeMore's Playhouse	September 10, 2006	November 2, 2009	
Jim Knox's Wild Zoofari	September 2, 2007	September 1, 2010	
Raggs	February 4, 2008	February 1, 2014	
Wunderkind Little Amadeus	September 7, 2008	September 6, 2020	
Big Green Rabbit	October 5, 2008	October 4, 2011	
Bali^{1}	September 12, 2010	August 31, 2021	
Wild Animal Baby Explorers	October 1, 2010	January 7, 2014	
Space Racers	May 2, 2014	October 31, 2016	(Note: Premieres moved to Universal Kids in 2016.)
Thomas Edison's Secret Lab	September 7, 2015	September 6, 2020	
Bug Bites	January 4, 2016	January 3, 2019	
Ruby's Studio	January 7, 2016	January 6, 2022	
Mack & Moxy	February 5, 2016	February 16, 2020	
Young Voices for the Planet	April 8, 2016	April 7, 2019	

==== Programming from NETA ====
The following programs are distributed by National Educational Telecommunications Association, not PBS itself. These programs are broadcast by select local PBS stations.

Title	Premiere date	End date	Source(s)
Curiosity Quest	July 16, 2004	2021	
The Shapies	2004	2006	
Auto-B-Good	January 17, 2005	December 23, 2005	
Kids for Positive Change	July 1, 2021	June 30, 2024	

==== Interstitial programming ====
Title	Premiere date	End date	Source(s)
Dash's Game of the Day	September 4, 2006	May 16, 2008	
Dot's Story Factory	September 3, 2007	October 6, 2013	
Dash's Secret Treasure	May 19, 2008	October 6, 2013	
Music Time with SteveSongs	May 19, 2008	July 18, 2022	
Dash's Dance Party	September 7, 2009	October 6, 2013	
Adventures with Hooper	September 7, 2009	September 5, 2010	
Coach Hooper	September 6, 2010	2020	
PBS Kids Field Trip	September 6, 2010	2020	
Where in the World is Hooper?	September 6, 2010	2020	
PBS Kids Spotlight	January 15, 2016	July 18, 2022	

==== Short-form programming ====
Title	Premiere date	End date	Source(s)
The Amazing Colossal Adventures of WordGirl	November 10, 2006	October 10, 2007	
Pocoyo	January 4, 2010	December 26, 2021	(Note: Pocoyo was distributed to local PBS stations by American Public Television from January 4, 2010 through January 3, 2018, and it was aired in the same half-hour timeslot alongside Peep and the Big Wide World; later reruns aired on PBS Kids 24/7 from January 1, 2018 through December 26, 2021.)

==== Blocks ====
Block title	Launch date	End date	Source(s)
PBS Kids Bookworm Bunch	September 30, 2000	September 5, 2004	
PBS Kids Go!	October 11, 2004	October 6, 2013	
PBS Kids Preschool	September 4, 2006	October 6, 2013	

== Special programming ==
Programs with marked with an asterisk (*) have been featured on the Family Night weekend primetime block on PBS Kids 24/7.

Title	Initial broadcast date	Source(s)
Noddy: Anything Can Happen At Christmas	December 6, 1998	
Party with Zoom	1999	
Arthur's Perfect Christmas*	November 23, 2000	
Zoom: America's Kids Respond	September 20, 2001	
Barney's Christmas Star	2002	
Elmo's World: Happy Holidays!	2002	
Arthur, It's Only Rock 'n' Roll	September 1, 2002	
Zoom: America's Kids Remember	September 8, 2002	
Bob the Builder Snowed Under: The Bobblesberg Winter Games	December 17, 2005	
Arthur's Missing Pal	August 18, 2007	
Panwapa	2008	
Abby in Wonderland	November 28, 2008	
Curious George: A Very Monkey Christmas*	November 25, 2009	
Curious George	November 23, 2011	
Curious George 2: Follow That Monkey!*	November 23, 2011	
WordGirl: The Rise of Miss Power*	February 20, 2012	
The Cat in the Hat Knows a Lot About Christmas!*	November 21, 2012	
Clifford's Really Big Movie	December 14, 2012	
Sid the Science Kid: The Movie*	March 25, 2013	
Curious George Swings Into Spring*	April 22, 2013	
Curious George: A Halloween Boo Fest*	October 28, 2013	
Elmo's Christmas Countdown	November 27, 2013	
The Cyberchase Movie	April 15, 2014	
The Cookie Thief*	February 16, 2015	
Curious George 3: Back to the Jungle*	August 17, 2015	
Wild Kratts: A Creature Christmas*	November 25, 2015	
The Cat in the Hat Knows a Lot About Camping!*	July 25, 2016	
Odd Squad: The Movie*	August 1, 2016	
The Cat in the Hat Knows a Lot About Halloween!*	October 28, 2016	
Wild Kratts: Creatures of the Deep Sea*	November 23, 2016	
The Cat in the Hat Knows a Lot About Space!*	December 26, 2016	
Daniel Tiger's Neighborhood: A Tiger Family Trip*	May 8, 2017	
Ready Jet Go!: Back to Bortron 7*	August 14, 2017	
Arthur: D.W. and the Beastly Birthday*	May 29, 2017	
Wild Kratts Alaska: Hero's Journey*	July 24, 2017	
Wild Alaska Live*	July 29, 2017	
Arthur and the Haunted Tree House*	October 23, 2017	
Once Upon a Sesame Street Christmas*	November 22, 2017	
The Gruffalo*	December 1, 2017	
The Gruffalo's Child*	December 1, 2017	
Stick Man*	December 1, 2017	
Room on the Broom*	December 1, 2017	
Odd Squad: World Turned Odd*	January 15, 2018	
Nature Cat: The Return of Bad Dog Bart*	July 16, 2018	
The Daniel Tiger Movie: Won't You Be My Neighbor?*	September 17, 2018	
The Highway Rat*	December 7, 2018	
Let's Go Luna!: Luna's Christmas Around the World*	December 10, 2018	
Odd Squad: Odds and Ends*	January 21, 2019	
The Magical Wand Chase: A Sesame Street Special*	March 25, 2019	
Cyberchase: Space Waste Odyssey*	April 19, 2019	
Ready Jet Go!: One Small Step*	June 17, 2019	
Pinkalicious and Peterrific: A Pinkaperfect Birthday*	August 5, 2019	
Nature Cat: A Nature Carol*	November 29, 2019	
Rhythm and Roots of Arthur*	January 20, 2020	
Odd Squad: Odd Beginnings*	February 17, 2020	
Xavier Riddle and the Secret Movie: I Am Madam President*	March 16, 2020	
Sesame Street: Elmo's Playdate	April 14, 2020	
Wild Kratts: Amazin' Amazon Adventure*	April 20, 2020	
When You Wish Upon A Pickle: A Sesame Street Special*	July 13, 2020	
Daniel Tiger's Neighborhood Won't You Sing Along with Me?*	August 17, 2020	
PBS Kids Talk About: Race and Racism*	October 9, 2020	
The Power of We: A Sesame Street Special*	October 15, 2020	
An Arthur Thanksgiving*	November 16, 2020	
Pinkalicious and Peterrific: Cupid Calls It Quits*	February 8, 2021	
Dinosaur Train: Adventure Island*	April 12, 2021	
Molly of Denali: Molly and the Great One*	June 7, 2021	
Wild Kratts: Cats and Dogs*	July 12, 2021	
Arthur's First Day*	September 6, 2021	
See Us Coming Together: A Sesame Street Special*	November 25, 2021	
Sesame Street: The Monster at the End of This Story*	March 7, 2022	
Elinor Wonders Why: A Wonderful Journey*	April 18, 2022	
Daniel Tiger's Neighborhood: Daniel Visits a New Neighborhood*	June 20, 2022	
Curious George 4: Royal Monkey*	July 1, 2022	
Curious George 5: Go West, Go Wild*	July 1, 2022	
Sesame Street: Furry Friends Forever: Elmo Gets a Puppy*	March 13, 2023	
Ready Jet Go!: Space Camp*	July 20, 2023	
Sesame Street: The Nutcracker: Starring Elmo & Tango*	December 2, 2023	
Rocket Saves the Day*	December 26, 2023	
Wild Kratts: Our Blue and Green World*	April 1, 2024	
Nature Cat’s Nature Movie Special Extraordinaire*	April 22, 2024	
Brambletown*	July 26, 2024	
Mystery League*	March 22, 2025	
Acoustic Rooster and His Barnyard Band*	May 1, 2025	
Wowsabout*	May 1, 2026	
Storm on Sesame Street	August 3, 2026	
The Day You Begin	August 7, 2026	
Nature: Sesame Street and the Great Elephant Adventure	October 14, 2026	

=== Special programming from American Public Television ===
Title	Initial broadcast date	Source(s)
Davy Jones' Locker	November 1, 1997	
Barney's Great Adventure	October 1, 2000	
The Redwall Movie	c. 2002	
VeggieTales: The Star of Christmas	December 23, 2002	
VeggieTales: Duke and the Great Pie War	April 1, 2005	
Heidi 4 Paws: A Furry Tale	November 23, 2008	
Science Mission 101	February 1, 2010	
Scientastic!	September 2, 2010	
Scientastic!	April 2014	
Biz Kids: Three Minutes to Change the World	May 20, 2012	
Lost Treasure Hunt	October 1, 2014	

=== Acquired special programming ===
Title	Initial broadcast date	Source(s)
A Charlie Brown Thanksgiving	November 22, 2020	(Note: Aired twice (November 22, 2020 and November 21, 2021) on PBS and PBS Kids 24/7.)
A Charlie Brown Christmas	December 13, 2020	(Note: Aired twice (December 13, 2020 and December 19, 2021) on PBS and PBS Kids 24/7.)
It's the Great Pumpkin, Charlie Brown	October 24, 2021	(Note: Aired only once (October 24, 2021) on PBS and PBS Kids 24/7.)
MeteoHeroes: The Adventure Begins - Earth Day Special	April 22, 2022	(Note: Syndicated to public television stations by KVIE.)

== Web-exclusive programming ==
The following programming is exclusive to PBS Kids web-based platforms, such as the PBS Kids website, PBS Kids Video app, and other streaming platforms. This content is not broadcast by PBS Kids and has never been aired on television.

- ^{1} Co-distributed by Amazon Prime Video, the official streaming partner for PBS Kids programming

=== Short-form programming ===
Title	Release date	End date	Source(s)
Wilson & Ditch: Digging America	Fall 2009	2018	
Fizzy's Lunch Lab	November 16, 2009	February 2021	
Chuck Vanderchuck's "Something Something" Explosion	2011	2018	
Plum Landing^{1}	April 22, 2014	present	
Ruff Ruffman: Humble Media Genius	November 26, 2014	present	
The Ruff Ruffman Show^{1}	September 28, 2017	present	
PBS Kids Talk About	2018	present	
Scribbles and Ink^{1}	December 16, 2019	present	
Team Hamster	December 28, 2020	present	
Search It Up!	2020	present	
Mega Wow!	2021	present	
Tiny Time Travel	March 15, 2024	present	

=== Podcasts ===
- Fetch! with Ruff Ruffman Podcast (May 22, 2007−September 19, 2010)
- Molly of Denali Podcast (May 30, 2019−April 21, 2021)
- The Pinkalicious & Peterrific Podcast (October 28, 2020−March 13, 2025)
- Odd Squadcast (December 2, 2020−December 30, 2020)
- The Arthur Podcast (October 20, 2022−present)
- Keyshawn Solves It (May 29, 2023−June 19, 2023)
- Jamming on the Job (September 14, 2023−present)
- Work It Out Wombats! Podcast (January 4, 2024−present)
- Lyla’s Loopcast (May 8, 2025−present)

== See also ==
- List of programs broadcast by PBS
- List of programs broadcast by American Public Television
