= Izen =

Izen is a surname. Notable people with the surname include:

- Marshall Izen (died 2015), American entertainer
- Michael Izen (born 1967), American bishop
