= Milk and Bookies =

Non-profit organization

Milk + Bookies is a 501(c)(3) non-profit organization based in the United States. The organization's stated mission is two-fold: 1) providing opportunities for children to experience giving back to their community and 2) literacy promotion in underserved areas of the population. While book donations are an integral element of the Milk + Bookies' mission, another cornerstone of their program is Service Learning: instilling the seed of giving into each child participant, sparking feelings of importance, self-confidence, and the desire to give and give again.

== History ==
Milk + Bookies was founded in 2004 by Meredith Alexander, a Los Angeles-based mother of two. In 2009, Heidi Lindelof and Laura Zimmerman, also Los Angeles-based moms, joined Meredith on the Milk + Bookies Board of Directors. That same year, Milk + Bookies was designated a 501(c)(3) non-profit corporation.

== Programs ==
Milk + Bookies' programs include:

=== M+B Class Project ===
Through Milk + Bookies, kids of all ages host events in their local school or hometown bookstore and are eligible to earn community service hours. The M+B Class Project requires the hosts to invite families with young children to spend the day celebrating books and experience giving. Children ages 3 and up are asked to choose, purchase and inscribe a book to be donated to a local child of a similar age who has little or no access to books. The events often include music, story-inspired arts & crafts and milk & cookies. Milk + Bookies provides students with a checklist on the necessary steps for hosting a Milk + Bookies Class Project event. The student hosts are then charged with finding a recipient group for delivery of the book donations. In the past, Milk + Bookies has recommended the following organizations as recipients of donations: Operation School Bell, Head Start or Boys and Girls Clubs of America.

=== M+B Birthday Party ===
The Milk + Bookies Birthday Party was conceived as a way to provide parents with an alternative for hosting a birthday party for their child, with the emphasis veering away from excessive gifts. Guests are asked to bring a new or gently used children's book in lieu of a gift for the birthday child. Milk + Bookies provides hosts with a "Bookies Box" which contains the necessary materials for hosting: bookplates, balloons, "I Donated" stickers, bookmarks and Milk + Bookies literature to facilitate parent discussions with young children regarding the importance of helping others. The guests are given the option of inscribing bookplates to adhere to their donation and subsequently receiving an "I Donated" sticker to wear. The birthday child and family choose a recipient group, then deliver the books to the recipients so that the birthday child can experience the joy of giving personally.

=== Leaders + Readers ===
Leaders + Readers is a special Milk + Bookies program designed to encourage student volunteers in the Los Angeles community, organizing book drives to benefit another Los Angeles based "sister" school. The goal of every Leaders + Readers Book Drive is to flood underserved Los Angeles schools with books to support learning and academic excellence, and allow students to gain experience with leadership and community service.

== Notable people involved ==
Milk + Bookies receives a great deal of assistance and involvement from celebrities as well as organizations and individuals based both locally in Los Angeles and nationwide.

=== Celebrities ===
- Jennifer Garner
- Rainn Wilson
- Jason Biggs
- Peter Facinelli
- Hayden Panettiere
- Jack Coleman
- Masi Oka
- Dave Grohl
- Jennie Garth
- Marlon Wayans
- Jonah Hill
- Max Greenfield
- Jenny Mollen
- Julie Bowen
- Eric Stonestreet
- Peyton List
- Ginnifer Goodwin
- Don Cheadle
- DJ Lance Rock
- Marla Sokoloff
- Amanda Peet
- Chris Pine
- Chris Messina
- Nathan Fillion
- Jenna Elfman
- Sarah Chalke
- Jerry Ferrara
- Josh Holloway
- Maya Rudolph
- Josh Dallas
- J. J. Abrams
- Dallas Clayton
- Adam Scott
- Jack Black
- Dan Bucatinsky
- Ariel Winter
- Gwen Stefani
- Jayma Mays
- Mark Feuerstein
- Constance Zimmer
- Tom Everett Scott
- Elisabeth Röhm
- Busy Philipps
- Malin Åkerman
- Garcelle Beauvais
- Tiffani Thiessen
- Sarah Michelle Gellar
- Zachary Quinto
- Ali Wentworth
- Elizabeth Banks
- Ashlee Simpson
- Pete Wentz
- Megan Nicole
- Henry Winkler
- Stefan Lessard
- Damon Lindelof
- Kat Dennings
- John Cho
- Gwendoline Christie
- Lena Dunham
- Adam Campbell
- Ali Larter
- Glenn Howerton
- Molly Sims
- KaDee Strickland
- Joe Hahn
- Johnathon Schaech
- Heather McDonald
- Majandra Delfino
- David Walton
- Jillian Rose Reed
- Skai Jackson
- Danielle Panabaker
- Rebecca Gayheart
- Eric Dane
- Tom Felton
- Naomi Scott
- Karan Brar
- Jason Behr
- Lena Headey
- Tamera Mowry
- Miranda Cosgrove
- David Koechner
- B. J. Novak
- Paget Brewster

=== Sponsors and Partner Organizations ===
- Tiny Prints
- little junebugs
- The Land of Nod
- Discover Books
- The Honest Company
- Isabella's Cookie Company
- McConnell's Ice Cream
- Ralphs
- Punchbowl.com
- Ergobaby
- TOMS
- Annie's Homegrown
- SoulCycle
- Bakeology
- Skirball Cultural Center
- Barnes & Noble
- Truth Be Told PR
- Elements Events
- John W. Carson Foundation
- Marc Jacobs
- The Langham Huntington Pasadena Hotel
- Dylan's Candy Bar
- Crafting Community
- Disney/ABC Television Group
- DreamWorks Studios
- Splendid
- The Mother Company
- Tot Squad
- The Gap
