= Just a Common Soldier =

"Just a Common Soldier", also known as "A Soldier Died Today", is a poem written in 1987.

Written and published in 1987 by Canadian veteran and columnist A. Lawrence Vaincourt, it now appears in a number of anthologies and newspapers, particularly around Remembrance Day.

The Australian Legion included it in their video tribute, Victory in the Pacific, and it was a central part of the 2009 Royal British Legion Poppy Appeal.

In 2008 it was carved into marble for an American veterans' memorial.

Set to music by the author's son, composer Randy Vancourt, it has been released several times as a recording, most recently on November 1, 2013 by American singer Connie Francis.
