= Randy Vancourt =

Canadian composer and entertainer

- Born: Canada
- Occupations: writer composer actor
- Known for: writer-performer, Chutzpah a go-go composer, The Adventures of Dudley the Dragon

Randy Vancourt is a Canadian composer and entertainer. A Juno Award nominated composer, he has written music for television series such as Man Alive, Hello Mrs. Cherrywinkle, Carmen SanDiego and Dudley the Dragon.

He is also a writer of stage musicals including Chutzpah a Go-Go, Born Lucky, Boardwalk! and The Rocky Road To Dublin.

His recordings have received international airplay, with his Radio Freaks songs appearing on the syndicated Dr. Demento radio show.

He is a founding member of the comedy troupe Radio Freaks who appeared for three years on CIUT Radio.

Randy is the son of author A. Lawrence Vaincourt, notable for his popular poem Just A Common Soldier.

== Works ==
- Forever For Now (1992)
- Chutzpah a Go-Go (1993)
- Boardwalk! (2007)
- Smashed (2008)
- Born Lucky (2008)
- The Rocky Road To Dublin (2010)
- The Bonnie Banks (2012)
- Bring The Piano (2016)
- Tuned (2018)
