= Ronnie Burkett =

Canadian puppeteer

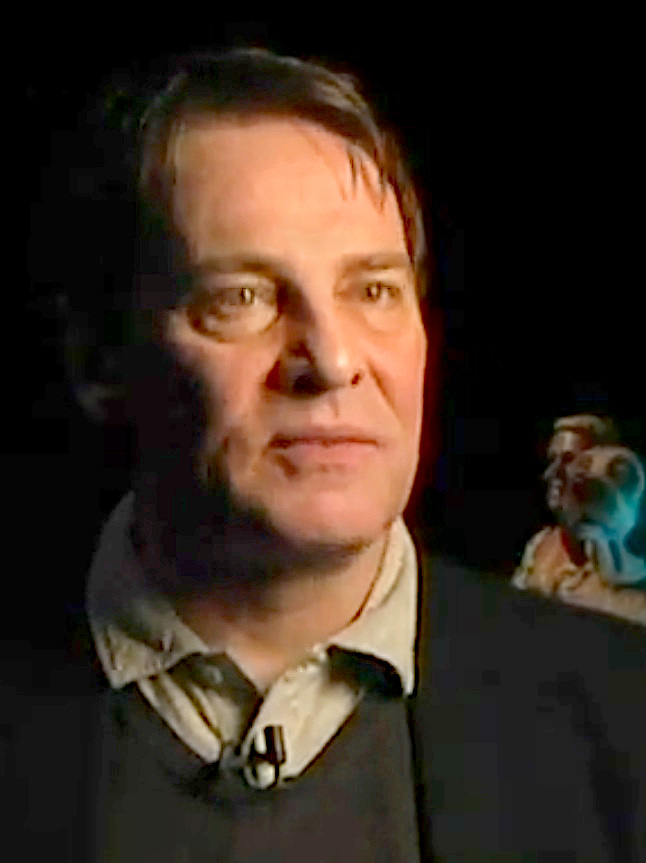
Ronnie Burkett CTM interview in 2012

Ronnie Burkett, OC is a Canadian puppeteer, best known for his original theatrical plays for adults, performed with marionettes. Burkett, who hails from Medicine Hat, was the puppeteer for Ralph on the TV Ontario series Harriet's Magic Hats during seasons three and four. He was also credited on two television shows; Chicken Minute and Little Star.

== Career ==
After winning a regional Emmy Award in 1979 for the puppets in "Cinderrabbit" on PBS in the US, Burkett formed his own theatre company in Alberta in 1986. His early works included Fool's Edge, Virtue Falls, The Punch Club and Awful Manors, as well as being an extra puppeteer on Under the Umbrella Tree. In 1994, his work Tinka's New Dress was his international breakthrough, winning two Dora Awards, four Elizabeth Sterling Haynes Awards and a special citation from the Obie Awards. Performed internationally, Tinka's New Dress was the first part of a trilogy which continued with Street of Blood in 1999 and Happy in 2000. He also won a Chalmers Award in 1996 for Old Friends, a piece commissioned by the Manitoba Theatre for Young People. In 2009, Burkett received the Siminovitch Prize in Theatre for design. In 2015, Burkett was the recipient of the Distinguished Artist Award from the Lieutenant Governor of Alberta Arts Awards for his contributions to the arts in Alberta.

His work, Provenance, was performed for the first time in October 2003, premiering at Theatre Network in Edmonton. In November 2007, he finished touring his show 10 Days on Earth that premiered at CanStage in Toronto in April 2006. In October 2008, he premiered his quasi-autobiographical show, Billy Twinkle: Requiem for a Golden Boy, at the Citadel Theatre in Edmonton; the show toured several cities in Canada, the UK, and Australia through late 2009. In 2011–2012, he did an extensive Canadian tour of his new play, an apocalyptic comedy, Penny Plain. His latest work, The Daisy Theatre, inspired by underground Czech marionette theatre, is part improvisation and part cabaret and includes short vignettes penned by other Canadian playwrights.

Burkett usually writes his own scripts. Appearing onstage throughout each performance, he manipulates and is the voice of every character, from newborn ducks to dying mothers, Christ and Satan and everything in between.

== Early life ==
Ronnie Burkett was born June 10, 1957, in Lethbridge, Alberta and spent his formative years in Medicine Hat. At age seven, he became fascinated with puppets after reading an article in the World Book Encyclopedia. After seeing Bil Baird's puppets in "The Lonely Goatherd" scene in the 1965 film The Sound of Music, Burkett was determined to become a puppeteer. He claims his first "real" show was a hand puppet musical titled The Patchwork Girl of Oz, which he wrote and began touring at age 14. He attended Medicine Hat College for a year and was awarded a theatre scholarship to Brigham Young University in Utah but left after a semester to pursue his career.

Openly gay, Burkett lives in Toronto with his partner, jazz singer John Alcorn.
