= Gerbert (TV series) =

American children's religious television series

- Title card
- Created by: Andy Holmes
- Country of origin: United States
- No. of seasons: 3
- No. of episodes: 50

Production
- Running time: 20-35 minutes
- Production company: Home Sweet Home Educational Media Company

Original release
- Network: The Family Channel
- Release: May 1, 1988 – December 25, 1991

Related
- Whirligig! (1993)

Gerbert is an American Christian-themed children's television series produced by Brad Smith and created by Andy Holmes.

The Gerbert series was co-produced by HSH Educational Media and CBN in 1987. HSH Educational Media was owned by Brad Smith and his brother Chris Christian. Chris Christian and Brad Smith were the executive producers of all the Gerbert TV shows. The Gerbert TV show first aired on the CBN Cable Network, which later changed its name to CBN Family Channel and The Family Channel. The first shows were taped in Virginia Beach, Virginia at the CBN studios and all other shows were taped in Irving, Texas, at the Studios at Las Colinas.

== Premise ==
The series focuses on a young boy named Gerbert as he interacts with the world around him. Typical scenarios involve Gerbert facing everyday occurrences and issues such as chores, fights between friends, insecurity, and low self-esteem. Each episode ends with the problems resolved and Gerbert learning a lesson, which he imparts to the viewer.

== Development ==
Andy Holmes came up with the general concept of Gerbert while he was a junior high student at Cooper High in Abilene, Texas. He continued to develop the character while pursuing his mass communications degree at Abilene Christian University and by 1986 was actively promoting the character by way of puppet shows and themed coloring books. Holmes also developed the "Gerbert Pediapac" program, which was intended to help children deal with emotions stemming from hospitalization.

In 1986 Holmes began working with HSH Educational Media to create a Gerbert themed album. Pat Robertson took notice of the character after his grandchildren obtained Gerbert tapes. Noticing their enthusiasm for the character, Robertson ordered full series for the CBN Family Channel. The pilot episode aired in 1987, followed by a full season the following year.

Holmes served as a writer for the show alongside Steve Sylvester, while Chris Christian was brought on to write musical numbers.

== Broadcast ==
A pilot episode for Gerbert aired on the CBN Family Channel (now Freeform) in 1987. CBN ordered a series and the series ran from May 1, 1988 to December 25, 1991. It has aired on Christian television stations and networks continuously since its 1988 debut. A secular version, without religious content, was syndicated to public television stations from 1993 to 1997. The series aired in the late 2000s on KidMango.

The show aired reruns on the Smile network until the series was pulled off the air in 2019.

Internationally, it was also broadcast on the Australian Christian Channel in Australia and in Lebanon’s Christian network, Middle East Television.

== Merchandising and tie-ins ==
Several pieces of merchandise have been created for the Gerbert series such as coloring books, film strips, records, and VHS tapes. HSH Educational Media also allowed the character to appear at in-person puppet shows at Dillard's, where attendees were educated on school safety.

== Episodes ==
=== Series overview ===
Season	Episodes	Originally released	
Season	Episodes	First released	Last released
Pilot		June 7, 1987	
1	13	May 1, 1988	July 23, 1988
2	13	April 3, 1989	May 31, 1989
3	24	May 6, 1991	December 25, 1991

=== Pilot (1987) ===
Title	Original release date
"In the World Around Us"	June 7, 1987
Gerbert creates a whimsical musical adventure one night with his babysitter. A colorful, nostalgic set, warm music videos, and a lively script create an excellent environment encouraging imaginative play and healthy personal development. The World Around Us includes six music videos. A special guest appearance by Courtney makes this a truly unique and memorable experience. Note: Gerbert's design is drastically different in the pilot, resembling a generic puppet. His design was changed prior to the production of the first season of the TV show, complete with his signature chicken-nugget-shaped head, smaller mouth, and slightly rounder eyes.

=== Season 1 (1988) ===
No. overall	No. in season	Title	Original release date
1	1	"Surprise Party" "Love Your Neighbor as Yourself"	May 1, 1988
Gerbert's friends decided to have a surprise party for his birthday. Believing his friends have forgotten his birthday, Gerbert is tempted to self-pity. Children will learn from several Bible stories that David, King Jehosaphat and others had to wrestle with these same feelings. In the end, Gerbert is surprised, and also learns a deeper meaning of God's command to "love your neighbor as yourself."
2	2	"A Clean Sweep" "Created for Good Works"	May 7, 1988
Gerbert is asked to clean his room. Through a little soul-searching and some timely counsel from an unlikely source, Gerbert learns a creative way to turn a chore into a challenge. In the end, he learns the pleasure of choosing obedience.
3	3	"The Lost Coin" "Lost and Found"	May 14, 1988
Gerbert learns the value of taking care of special things. Gerbert begins to understand that we are created to do good works for God's glory. Kids learn that doing a good work for someone is like giving them a beautiful gift. It doesn't prevent mistakes, though, as Gerbert discovers when he loses a gift from his grandmother and learns to retrace his steps. Through the pain of loss, Gerbert reminds us of Jesus, the Good Shepherd, who seeks every lost sheep.
4	4	"The Cat's Meow"	May 21, 1988
Gerbert is eagerly anticipating a new pet kitten, but is surprised at the outcome. Children experience Gerbert's sadness and disappointment, but learn that God's love is constant despite circumstances. Gerbert learns that even in failure that God's love and acceptance cannot be overcome.
5	5	"Things Are Looking Up" "Little Ones to Him Belong"	May 28, 1988
Gerbert becomes frustrated. God's gift of self-esteem. In this big world of ours a child can feel pretty small and even unimportant sometimes. May Gerbert's experience kindle you and your child's hearts to discover afresh our loving Father's care for each of His "little ones". including you and me.
6	6	"Hop to It"	June 4, 1988
Gerbert gets a pogo stick. Gerbert learns the value of perseverance and experiences the joy of achievement. Good friends are a source of joy, too, and through Gerbert's telling the story of the Good Samaritan, children are reminded that true love doesn't have narrow limits.
7	7	"I'm All Right" "The Doctor"	June 11, 1988
Gerbert fears going to the doctor. Everyone has fears from time to time, and Gerbert talks with Roary (his stuffed lion) about how hard it is to be brave. In the Bible story of Jesus quieting the storm, children see that adults, too, can have fears. In telling the story of David and Goliath, Gerbert realizes that fear and courage go together. Discovering the promise that God will be our strength, Gerbert overcomes his fear of the doctor, teaching children to rely on the Lord.
8	8	"Some Days Are Like That" "God Knows My Feelings"	June 18, 1988
Gerbert has a bad day. We all have bad or vicious thoughts from time to time. These can make us feel quite terrible about ourselves. May your child learn with Gerbert that God knows our feelings and still loves us.
9	9	"Forever Friends"	June 25, 1988
Gerbert learns that his best friend has to move away. May this simple story help lift the pain of loss and settle the comforting reality that there is a Friend who will never leave us . . . Christ Jesus, our Lord.
10	10	"Gerbert Saves His Money" "Saving Treasures"	July 2, 1988
Gerbert learns the value of money. Gerbert learns the painfulness of deception. He first encounters the deceptiveness of riches, and then the Bible story of Samson teaches that sometimes people, even our friends, can be deceptive, too. Gerbert grows through this lesson and joyfully discovers that our heavenly Father never deceives us, and realizes our true treasure is in the Lord.'
11	11	"Look Before You Leap" "Safe in His Arms"	July 9, 1988
Gerbert learns the importance of safety gear. By nature, we resist the authority that is over us because we think our way is better. Children often test the limits and challenge authority figures in an effort to become independent. Gerbert chooses his own wisdom over that of his daddy when riding his scooter. And, it seems to work...at first.
12	12	"Forgive and Forget"	July 16, 1988
Gerbert learns to forgive and forget when Stu accidentally ruins his kite. Through his experience, Gerbert learns that as he turns his angry feelings over to God, God grants him the gift of self-control.
13	13	"Miles Get Married" "Wedding Bell Blues"	July 23, 1988
Miles asks Gerbert to be in his wedding. Gerbert reads the story of creation and man's fall. Then Gerbert gets invited to participate in his friend Miles wedding, but gets confused and afraid. In the process he learns, like Adam at the fall, that fear causes us to hide, But then. as now, God's love actively reaches to us all.

=== Season 2 (1989) ===
No. overall	No. in season	Title	Original release date
14	1	"Rainy Day"	April 3, 1989
Gerbert learns to deal with disappointment.
15	2	"The Crush"	April 4, 1989
Gerbert has a crush on his teacher.
16	3	"Why Do People Quit Liking Each Other?" "Loyalty Conflicts"	April 5, 1989
Gerbert gets caught in the middle of his friends' fight. In Praise of Pursuing Love. Gerbert is caught in the middle when two of his best friends stubbornly decide they both want to be "Editor-in-Chief" of the neighborhood newspaper. As Gerbert hurts over the dissolved friendship, they each secretly ask him to be their own cartoonist. Through some caring counsel from an older neighbor, they learn a meaningful and practical lesson in true love, namely, that true love never fails.
17	4	"Broken Promises"	April 6, 1989
Gerbert learns to be understanding and forgiving.
18	5	"Roary"	April 7, 1989
Roary disappears.
19	6	"Overcoming Evil by Doing Good" "Peer Pressure"	May 22, 1989
Gerbert learns to do the right thing. Gerbert is forced to choose between deeply wanted acceptance and doing the right thing when two older kids from school put their "test of friendship" on him. Gerbert tells God all of his feelings, and in doing so finds the courage to choose the better way. His friends learn of his decision to do right, and through Gerbert's decision they, too, find encouragement and motivation to do the right thing as well. "Overcoming Evil by Doing Good"' was written out of a conviction that far too much is said about not associating with sinners, and far too little about our lights shining in the darkness. Gerbert's manner of prayer over this matter is candid and direct with 'heart-felt honesty.
20	7	"Jealousy"	May 23, 1989
Gerbert and his friend compete in a contest.
21	8	"Listening Is Loving" "Listening Skills"	May 24, 1989
Gerbert learns to be a good listener. Caring Enough To Be Quick To Listen. When Gerbert's poster wins the first prize at school he is ecstatic and can hardly wait to tell his friends all about it. However, no one wants to listen. Gerbert learns, both from his own experience and that of his friends it is not always easy to be a good listener. In the end, Gerbert gets to tell his friends all about his good news and, at last, things are made right again. Listening is Loving carries a message that is immediately clear. Few of us would claim perfection in the area of being a good listener. Yet, throughout the Bible we read verses which make it clear that true freedom is found and true love is expressed when our focus is off of ourselves and on another. This simple video displays the importance of not only being listened to by others. but, also being a good listener and hearing what others have to say, We will all do well to remember the proverb: "Even a fool is thought wise if he keeps silent, and discerning if he holds his tongue."
22	9	"Little White Lies"	May 25, 1989
Chicken pox teaches Gerbert to tell the truth.
23	10	"Boredom"	May 26, 1989
Gerbert and Roary pass the time constructively.
24	11	"Adoption" "Before My First Day Began"	May 29, 1989
Gerbert's friend contemplates running away from home. God's Gracious Gift of Full and Rich Adoption Gerbert's friend, Patrick, is thinking of running away from home. He feels he does not fit in anywhere because he is an adopted child. Patrick learns that Gerbert is also adopted, and the two of them talk about their feelings. Gerbert talks about "famous"' people in the Bible who were adopted, such as Moses. Finally, Patrick discovers in a fresh and very personal way that God is his Father, and we are all His "adopted" children. "Before My First Day Began" was written primarily to offer forth insight to adopted children. However, it also addresses the reality that we are all adopted into God's family. This is a very honest, tender, and helpful video for children (and families) of adoption.
25	12	"Too Much Change" "Integrity"	May 30, 1989
Gerbert receives too much change. Learning to Let Love Be Genuine in Our Lives. Gerbert suddenly has enough money to buy a much desired art easel when he is given back too much change at Mr. Kiser's store. Gerbert reasons that since he didn't steal the money, it is now his by an unfortunate mistake. Soon, he learns the consequences of taking that which wasn't rightfully his, and he returns the money and makes his wrong right. "Doing the Right Thing' illustrates just one of the many things that we can get away with, rationalize into approval, or simply "numb over". Perhaps you have faced this very situation. It's certainly a powerful enticement, but we must not quench the powerful voice of the Lord's Spirit. Sin, no matter how insignificant it appears, entangles us. It keeps us from doing the good we ought to do, thus making us its slave. Yet, our loving Father desires truth in our inward being, and love that stems from a pure heart.
26	13	"Wrongfully Blamed"	May 31, 1989
Gerbert is accused of cheating. Learning Obedience Through Our Sufferings. When Gerbert is wrongfully accused of cheating on his test in school, he learns to put on a face of love rather than anger and bitterness. In the end, justice is served. But more importantly, Gerbert learns an even deeper lesson: God sometimes allows us to be treated unfairly to train up our heart and mind in His most excellent way. "But, I Really Didn't Do it" was written to display an example of humility in action. Humility does not demand that its needs or wants be met by another. Rather, it entrusts full repayment to the Lord, and seeks to imitate God's heart in difficult circumstances.

=== Season 3 (1991) ===
No. overall	No. in season	Title	Original release date
27	1	"Dreamboat"	May 6, 1991
The gang learns about miscommunication.
28	2	"Starlight"	May 7, 1991
Gerbert feels fireflies can solve the energy problem.
29	3	"Being Franklin"	May 8, 1991
Gerbert portrays Benjamin Franklin and discovers the past.
30	4	"Word Is Worth a Thousand Pictures"	May 9, 1991
Gerbert pretends he is Marco Polo.
31	5	"Big Dreams"	May 10, 1991
Gerbert wishes to become Roary's big brother.
32	6	"Pranksters"	May 13, 1991
Gerbert learns that pranks sometimes backfire.
33	7	"The Garden"	May 14, 1991
Gerbert and Roary take an imaginary trip.
34	8	"Medicine Isn't Candy"	May 15, 1991
Gerbert learns to never treat medicine as candy.
35	9	"Try It, You'll Like It"	May 16, 1991
Gerbert learns to try new things.
36	10	"Giddy Up Pony"	May 17, 1991
Gerbert learns to set and reach goals.
37	11	"TV and Me"	May 20, 1991
The positive and negative influences on television.
38	12	"New Beginnings"	June 10, 1991
Gerbert deals with the death of a loved one.
39	13	"A Lesson Long Overdue"	June 11, 1991
Gerbert learns to obey rules and regulations.
40	14	"Bubble Trouble"	June 12, 1991
Gerbert learns to forgive and forget.
41	15	"If E'er the Twain Should Meet"	June 13, 1991
A journey down the Mississippi River.
42	16	"The Little Star That Twinkled"	June 14, 1991
Gerbert finds out he must practice to be good.
43	17	"Thanks, but No Thanks"	July 8, 1991
Gerbert learns about giving.
44	18	"Manners Manor"	July 9, 1991
Cassie learns to treat others nicely.
45	19	"Be Yourself"	July 10, 1991
Gerbert teaches others to be themselves.
46	20	"How Much Is That Froggie in the Window?"	July 11, 1991
Gerbert must decide whether to set his frog free.
47	21	"Fables on the Table"	July 12, 1991
Gerbert learns about reading improvement.
48	22	"Art From the Heart"	September 18, 1991
Gerbert learns his artistic talent is a gift.
49	23	"Fitness Follies"	October 17, 1991
The gang takes part in a fitness day.
50	24	"The Gift of Giving"	December 25, 1991
A special Christmas celebration of blessings when Gerbert gives rather than receives.

== Cast ==
=== Season 1 ===
- Milton Clarke - Miles (Episodes: Surprise Party, The Lost Coin, Things Are Looking Up, Hop To It, I'm All Right & Miles Get Married)
- Chris Frederick - Gerbert's Father (Episode: Look Before You Leap)
- Molly Goodrich - Miss Deegan (Episodes: Surprise Party, The Cat's Meow, Things Are Looking Up, Gerbert Saves His Money & Forgive and Forget)
- Andy Holmes - Gerbert
- David Norris - Stu (Episodes: Surprise Party, A Clean Sweep, Things Are Looking Up, Some Days Are Like That, Forgive and Forget, Gerbert Saves His Money & Miles Gets Married)
- Sharon Round - Gerbert's Mother (Episodes: Surprise Party, A Clean Sweep, The Lost Coin, Things Are Looking Up, Some Days Are Like That & I'm All Right)
- Chris Christian (Episodes: Things Are Looking Up (cameo - recording studio segment) & Some Days Are Like That)
- Shawn Dennsteadt (Episode: Forever Friends - credited as a 'Special Thanks to')
- Luke Garrett (Episodes: Things Are Looking Up (cameo - recording studio segment) & Forever Friends) (uncredited)

=== Season 2 ===
- Brad Arrington - Mr. Kramer, the School Principal (Episodes: The Crush, Jealously & Listening Is Loving)
- John Berry - Phil Alpha (Episodes: Broken Promises & Listening Is Loving)
- C. Teague Bodley - Hatley (Episodes: Overcoming Evil by Doing Good & Adoption)
- Tyler Chamberlain - Tyler (Episodes: Rainy Day, Why Do People Quit Liking Each Other?, Broken Promises, Too Much Change & Wrongfully Blamed)
- Chris Christian (Episode: Boredom - a flashback episode from 'Some Days Are Like That' singing "God Knows My Feelings")
- Stefani Crabtree - Donna (Episodes: The Crush (uncredited), Little White Lies (uncredited) & Wrongfully Blamed)
- Adam Faraizl - Patrick (Episodes: Adoption & Why Do People Quit Liking Each Other?)
- Maria Gracia - Mrs. Tollman (Episodes: The Crush, Jealousy, Listening Is Loving, Little White Lies & Wrongfully Blamed)
- Jaki Green - Ms. Taylor (Episode: Too Much Change)
- Patrick Guzman - Boy #1 (Episode: Adoption)
- Mark Holmes - Man lining up at the concert (Episode: Broken Promises)
- Wendy Holmes - Mrs. Holmes, 5th and 6th grade girls Track & Field Coach (Episode: Listening Is Loving)
- Robert Kramer - Dr. Biden (Episode: Little White Lies - only appeared on the film about Chickenpox)
- George Latchford - Mr. Earl Kiser (Episodes: The Crush, Listening Is Loving, Overcoming Evil by Doing Good, Too Much Change & Wrongfully Blamed)
- Abby Newman - Ashley (Episodes: Jealously, Listening Is Loving, Little White Lies (uncredited) & Wrongfully Blamed)
- J.R. Nutt - Max (Episode: Overcoming Evil by Doing Good)
- Sage Parker - Mrs. Baber (Episode: The Crush)
- Mikael Powell - Mr. Balman, the Milkman (Episode: Broken Promises)
- Nathan Roberts - Boy #2 (Episode: Adoption)
- Gena Sleete - Mrs. Kiser (Episodes: Rainy Day, Why Do People Quit Liking Each Other?, Roary Disappears, Adoption & Too Much Change)
- Brad Smith - Customer (Episode: Too Much Change)
- Agustin Solis - Mr. Street (Episode: Listening Is Loving)
- Melissa Townsend - Melissa (Episodes: Broken Promises, Little White Lies, Listening Is Loving & Overcoming Evil by Doing Good)

=== Season 3 ===
- Carlis Belson - Will (Episodes: Starlight, Being Franklin, Pranksters & Be Yourself)
- Christy Berry - One Little Indian (Episode: Giddy Up Pony)
- John Berry - Mr. Taylor (Episode: The Gift of Giving)
- John Cadenhead - Mr. Wigglesworth, the ice cream man (Episodes: Starlight, Bubble Trouble, Thanks, but No Thanks, Art From the Heart, Be Yourself & Fitness Follies)
- Gary Carter - Sly Fox (Episode: Giddy Up Pony)
- Tyler Chamberlain - Billy (Episode: If E'er the Twain Should Meet) / Tyler (Episode: Be Yourself)
- Darryl Cox (credited as Darrell Cox) - Malcolm, Mr. Kiser's brother (Episode: New Beginnings)
- Brian Eppes - Ricky (Episodes: Being Franklin (uncredited), Pranksters, Medicine Isn't Candy & Bubble Trouble) / Joe Bob (Episode: Giddy Up Pony) / Ned (Episode: If E'er the Twain Should Meet) / Bradley Smith (Episode: A Lesson Long Overdue)
- Chamblee Ferguson - Mr. Riley Retail (Episodes: Dreamboat, The Garden & If E'er the Twain Should Meet) / G.T. Gardener/The Giant (Episode: The Garden) / Twain (Episode: If E'er the Twain Should Meet)
- Jaki Green - Ms. Betsy Purcell, the mail carrier (Episodes: Starlight, Being Franklin, Try It, You'll Like It, Pranksters, Bubble Trouble, Manners Manor & Art From the Heart)
- Hillary Hickam - Hillary (Episode: TV and Me)
- Bryant Konnerman - Bryan (Episodes: Dreamboat, Medicine Isn't Candy, Big Dreams & Manners Manor) / Moe Bob (Episode: Giddy Up Pony) / Ben (Episode: If E'er the Twain Should Meet)
- George Latchford - Mr. Earl Kiser (Episodes: Dreamboat, Being Franklin, Medicine Isn't Candy, Try It, You'll Like It, New Beginnings, Thanks, but No Thanks, Manners Manor, How Much Is That Froggie in the Window?, Fables on the Table, Art From the Heart & Fitness Follies) / The Great Khan (Episode: A Word Is Worth a Thousand Pictures) / Maestro (Episode: The Little Star That Twinkled)
- Suzi McLaughlin - Artist (Episode: Art From the Heart)
- Lou Michaels - Mrs. Lawrence (Episode: The Gift of Giving)
- Greta Muller - Ms. Lenore (Episodes: A Word Is Worth a Thousand Pictures, Thanks, but No Thanks, A Lesson Long Overdue, Manners Manor, Be Yourself, Fables on the Table, Fitness Follies & The Gift of Giving) / Aunt Polly (Episode: If E'er the Twain Should Meet)
- Abby Newman - Cassie (Episodes: Dreamboat, Starlight, Being Franklin, Manners Manor & Be Yourself) / Becky (Episode: If E'er the Twain Should Meet) / Wendy Heather (Episode: A Lesson Long Overdue)
- Stephanie Oakes - Jennifer (Episode: Fitness Follies)
- David Price - Matthew Lawrence (Episode: The Gift of Giving)
- H. Lee Rimmer - Sports Announcer (voice only) (Episode: Fitness Follies)
- Jon Rivers - Radio Announcer (voice only) (Episode: Giddy Up Pony)
- Courtney Smith - Lisa Taylor (Episode: The Gift of Giving)
- Robert Tekampe - Mr. Lawrence (Episode: The Gift of Giving)
- Nikki Tilroe - Roary / Puppeteer / Alfred (Episode: How Much Is That Froggie in the Window?)
- Jenny Turner - Jenny (Episode: How Much Is That Froggie in the Window?)
- Jacqueline York - Nurse (Episode: New Beginnings)

== Reception ==
Upon its premiere Gerbert received praise from the Daily Press, which called it a "bright addition to Saturday morning TV".
