= The Reppies =

- Genre: Children's television series Educational; Musical
- Created by: Patrick McGonigle; Stephen McGonigle
- Opening theme: "We Are the Reppies"
- Ending theme: various closing themes
- Country of origin: United States
- Original language: English
- No. of seasons: 2
- No. of episodes: 27

Production
- Producer: James "Smokey" Knudson
- Running time: 28 minutes
- Production companies: Northstar Entertainment; Treat Entertainment; WEDU

Original release
- Network: PBS Member Stations
- Release: September 28, 1996 – March 22, 1998

The Reppies is a live-action American educational musical show for children, created by Northstar Entertainment along with Treat Entertainment, for PBS.

== Premise ==
The series centers around a group of anthropomorphic reptile creatures (in oversized costumes) made up of drummer and vocalist Derango, vocalist and dancer Bumba, keyboardist and vocalist Tessa, guitarist and vocalist Razz, and saxophonist and vocalist Lobo, that sing in a music group and interact with a Mary Poppins-like English tutor, who also sings and dances. In some of the episodes she seemingly displays magical powers.

== Cast ==
The cast includes American actress Trudie Petersen as Miss Summerhayes the English tutor, Rick Stanley as Mickey the band's manager, and 13-year-old actress Talia Osteen who plays Katie in four episodes.

=== Personnel ===
- Derango – drums, percussion, vocals
- Bumba – vocals
- Razz – guitar, vocals
- Lobo – saxophone, vocals
- Tessa – keyboards, vocals

== Production ==
The series was produced by WEDU Television in Tampa, Florida. Each episode featured three original songs produced by Rick Tell. Twenty six half hour episodes and one hour long holiday special were originally created in 1996, and aired on a few public television stations. All of the episodes were later re-dubbed with Christian-oriented messages and moved to Trinity Broadcasting Network and the Christian Television Network.

Originally created by Wendy Harrison from Sault Ste. Marie, Ontario, along with the father son team of Pat and Steve McGonigle of Northstar Entertainment. James "Smokey" Knudson was the series producer and Brian McBride as executive in charge of production for the entire series run. Bruce Foulke was the Music Supervisor for the series. The Christian version formerly aired on the Smile network.

== Episodes ==
=== Season 1 (1996–97) ===
No.	Title	Original release date
1	"Babes in the Woods"	September 28, 1996
Bumba's desire to prove herself comes to effect when The Reppies, Miss Summerhayes, and Mickey get lost during a hike in the woods. Meanwhile, Mr. King takes Heather and Buster fishing when a mysterious call deters their attempts.
2	"Parlez-vous Reppie?"	October 5, 1996
When The Reppies' French cousins---The Freppies---arrive for a visit, things don't go as planned. Jealousy and misunderstanding ignite as the two groups try to find common ground while The Reppies learn French along the way.
3	"Buster's Breakthrough"	October 12, 1996
As The Reppies prepare the theater for the school talent show, they discover one of their friends, Buster, has stage fright and is afraid to participate. So the gang tries the best to their ability to prove how special he truly is.
4	"Teacher's Pet"	October 19, 1996
While organizing a spelling bee, Razz develops a crush on Miss Summerhayes that's up for debate. Meanwhile, The Reppies prepare to perform a play prepared by Tessa.
5	"Things That Go Bumba in the Night"	October 26, 1996
When The Reppies, along with Heather, Katie and Buster, decide to have a sleepover in the old theater, a mysterious spirit causes shenanigans and fun as the gang band together to solve the mystery.
6	"A Merry Reppies Holiday Special"	December 28, 1996
As The Reppies prepare for a holiday concert, their friends explain the traditions associated with Christmas, Kwanzaa and Hanukkah during the happiest time of the year.
7	"Boot Up"	January 5, 1997
After The Reppies decide to buy their manager, Mickey, a computer, Mickey is uncertain about using one and even Bumba shows concern. Now it's up to the band and Heather to show how easy and fun a computer can be.
8	"Bringing Home Baby"	January 12, 1997
The Reppies help Heather adjust to the idea of sharing her parents with the new baby in the family.
9	"Bumba's Bird"	January 19, 1997
When an exotic bird, rousted from its home, decides to stay in the theater Bumba tries to make her a pet with disastrous results. Meanwhile, the theater's water is turned off as Uncle Mickey attempts to adapt.
10	"Come and Get It"	January 26, 1997
While planning an aerobics routing for "Healthy Constitution Day", Derango's habits of staying up late and eating sweets cause him trouble. Now it's up to the band and an Olympic athlete to teach proper exercise and dieting.
11	"Dream a Little Dream"	February 2, 1997
While Derango longs for a chance in the spotlight, Mickey teaches the group a lesson in rhythm while Miss Summerhayes teaches how hard work makes dreams come true.
12	"Gimme, Gimme"	February 9, 1997
A spoiled boy who wins a day with The Reppies desires to get Razz's guitar by any means. To show him the error of his ways, The Reppies help him discover the value of sharing.
13	"Good Vibrations"	February 16, 1997
After The Reppies receive a letter from Rosie, a hearing-impaired fan, Miss Summerhayes teaches the band sign language.
14	"Home is Where the Heart is"	February 23, 1997
Miss Summerhayes starts feeling homesick when she doesn't receive a letter from her family. Fearing she might leave them, The Reppies throw her an English tea party.
15	"Letter Home"	March 2, 1997
Miss Summerhayes writes a letter to her mother in England about her time teaching and getting along with The Reppies. Highlights from the series' first 13 episodes are featured.
16	"Lobo-itis"	March 9, 1997
The gang prepares a party to honor the theater's 70th anniversary. But Lobo fears going to the doctor when he suddenly feels sick.
17	"Lost and Found"	March 16, 1997
After Razz loses his Rhythm Egg, he goes into town to buy a new one. But things take a downward spiral when Razz gets lost and can't find his way home.
18	"Moving Away Blues"	March 23, 1997
Heather's best friend Katie and her family plan to move to Japan, as Heather worries they won't be friends anymore. Meanwhile, The Reppies throw a going-away party and the band announce the start of their first world tour.
19	"New Adventures"	March 30, 1997
After The Reppies move into an old theater, they are introduced to Britt Summerhayes, a teacher with magic powers, who shows that learning can be fun.

=== Season 2 (1998) ===
No.	Title	Original release date
20	"Nice Work If You Can Get It"	February 1, 1998
After a field trip to a museum, The Reppies fantasize about what they want to be when they grow up. Meanwhile, Razz has trouble with his tests while Heather doesn't know what career to pursue.
21	"No Place Like Home"	February 8, 1998
After the Reppies learn about far-away places in a round of the "Geography Game", Tessa gets the urge to travel.
22	"One Man Band"	February 15, 1998
After Razz brags about a new tune he claims to have written, Razz finds himself in a pickle when he undergoes writer's block. So Razz asks Miss Summerhayes for advice on admitting the truth.
23	"Picture Perfect"	February 22, 1998
While leading an environmental project, Lobo accidentally cuts down a healthy tree. Tessa takes up photography indulging the interest of a suspicious magazine journalist.
24	"Reduce, Reuse, Recycle"	March 1, 1998
After Derango creates "The Pick Up Club," the Reppies and some neighborhood kids compete to determine who collects the most trash.
25	"Save Your Money for a Rainy Day"	March 8, 1998
Derango learns the value of dollars and sense after a bank loan nearly costs him his baseball card collection, which he puts up as collateral. Meanwhile, Lobo and Uncle Mickey plan a benefit concert for retired musicians.
26	"Show and Tell"	March 15, 1998
During show and tell in school, Heather shares stories of how The Reppies became her friends. The stories include moments from "Bringing Home Baby" and "Moving Away Blues".
27	"Tessa in a Teacup"	March 22, 1998
The Reppies team up to repair a tour bus, but Tessa fears she's not up to the task. So Heather helps her by tackling the smaller tasks.
