= Bali (TV series) =

Animated television series

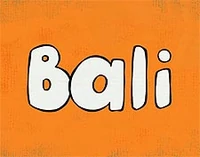
- Created by: Magdalena and Laurent Richard
- Directed by: Virgile Trouillot; J-S Vernerie
- Starring: Nick Chambers; Felicity Duncan; Jo Lee; Juliet Prague; Samantha Shaw
- Narrated by: Josie Lawrence; (only on the audiobooks)
- Countries of origin: France; Canada
- Original languages: French; English
- No. of seasons: 3
- No. of episodes: 26 (52 segments)

Production
- Executive producers: Marie-Josee Corbiel; Christine Cote; Frederic Peuch
- Running time: 23 minutes (11 minutes per segment)
- Production companies: Planet Nemo Animation; Subsequence Entertainment

Original release
- Network: Télévision de Radio-Canada (Canada); TVOntario (Canada); Knowledge Network (Canada); France 5 (France); Playhouse Disney (France)
- Release: September 4, 2006 – February 23, 2008

Bali is a children's animated television series, based on a series of French children's books by Magdalena Richard and Laurent Richard that were published by Editions Flammarion. It was produced by Paris-based Planet Nemo Animation and Subsequence Entertainment, in association with SRC Radio-Canada, TVOntario, Knowledge Network, France 5, Disney Channel France and RTBF, and with the participation of the Shaw Rocket Fund, the Quebec Film and Television Tax Credit, Telefilm Canada, the Canadian Film or Video Production Tax Credit, and the Canadian Television Fund (or the Fonds canadien de television in French). Planet Nemo Animation has licensed the television program to more than 20 countries worldwide and has sold U.S. media and merchandising rights.

The show first premiered in Canada on SRC Radio-Canada in 2006. It was also shown on PBS Kids in the USA in 2010 until 2013. Currently, it is airing on independent TV stations KUEN-TV, WNYE-TV, Semillitas, a Spanish-speaking U.S. television network, and PBS affiliate Arkansas PBS. Episodes are available to stream on Amazon Prime Video, through the PBS Kids subscription service.

== Premise ==
The show follows the adventures of Bali, who is a puppy living in the big city. He has everyday adventures with his baby sister Lea, friends Tamara and Sacha, and his stuffed toy, Kikou.

== Characters ==
- Bali, the main character of the series. He has many adventures with his friends and his stuffed toy, Kikou. He is voiced by Nathalie Stas in the French version and Felicity Duncan in the English dub.
- Elliot
- Mary
- Lea, Bali's baby sister
- Madame Olga
- Maman, Bali's mother
- Nanou
- Tito
- Tamara, Bali's best friend
- Sacha, Bali's other best friend
- Charlie, Bali's friend from preschool.
- Suan
- Saba
- Mateo, one of Bali's friends who is blind. He uses canes to get around.
- Papa, Bali's father
- Miss Chung, Bali's preschool teacher. She is voiced by Felicity Duncan in the English dub.

== Episodes ==
| Season | Episodes | Segments | Originally released | |
| Season | Episodes | Segments | First released | Last released |
|---|---|---|---|---|
| 1 | 8 | 16 | September 4, 2006 | [data missing] |
| 2 | 8 | 16 | [data missing] | [data missing] |
| 3 | 10 | 20 | [data missing] | February 23, 2008 |

=== Season 1 (2006) ===
| No. overall | No. in season | Title | Original release date |
|---|---|---|---|
| 1 | 1 | "Brrr! It's Cold!" | September 4, 2006 |
| 1 | 1 | "Lollipops Everywhere!" | September 4, 2006 |
| 2 | 2 | "I Need a Haircut" | TBA |
| 2 | 2 | "Nanou to the Rescue" | TBA |
| 3 | 4 | "I'm Not Scared" | TBA |
| 3 | 4 | "Need to Keep Going" | TBA |
| 4 | 4 | "I'm the Cook" | TBA |
| 4 | 4 | "Go Team, Go!" | TBA |
| 5 | 5 | "I Want to Be Tall!" | TBA |
| 5 | 5 | "We Need to Stay Awake" | TBA |
| 6 | 6 | "Vroom, Vroom!" | TBA |
| 6 | 6 | "My Little Fish" | TBA |
| 7 | 7 | "Searching for Treasure" | TBA |
| 7 | 7 | "My Papili's Garden" | TBA |
| 8 | 8 | "A Present for Nana" | TBA |
| 8 | 8 | "I'm so Hot!" | TBA |

=== Season 2 (2007) ===
| No. overall | No. in season | Title | Original release date |
|---|---|---|---|
| 9 | 1 | "I Don't Want to Give It Back" | TBA |
| 9 | 1 | "Robobear to the Rescue!" | TBA |
| 10 | 2 | "I'm Sleeping at Tamara's" | TBA |
| 10 | 2 | "I Don't Want New Shoes" | TBA |
| 11 | 3 | "A Surprise Adventure" | TBA |
| 11 | 3 | "Roll Camera, Action!" | TBA |
| 12 | 4 | "It's Wrong to Cheat" | TBA |
| 12 | 4 | "Too Many Stories" | TBA |
| 13 | 5 | "I'm Not Sharing!" | TBA |
| 13 | 5 | "You're Mean" | TBA |
| 14 | 6 | "My New Friend Mateo" | TBA |
| 14 | 6 | "Come on, Dad, Let's Go, Let's Go!" | TBA |
Bali meets a new friend, Mateo who's different than him because he is blind
| 15 | 7 | "Splish, Splash, I'm Swimming!" | TBA |
| 15 | 7 | "Don't Cry, Tamara!" | TBA |
Bali goes swimming in the pool / Tamara cries because she gets new glasses and is afraid to show them at school. Bali's imagination transports him to a stuffed animal school where he learns it's okay to be different sometimes.
| 16 | 8 | "I'm So Upset" | TBA |
| 16 | 8 | "Oh No! I'm Lost" | TBA |

=== Season 3 (2008) ===
| No. overall | No. in season | Title | Original release date |
|---|---|---|---|
| 17 | 1 | "Look at That, and That, and That!" | TBA |
| 17 | 1 | "When I Grow Up" | TBA |
| 18 | 2 | "Welcome, Saba!" | TBA |
| 18 | 2 | "It Was an Accident!" | TBA |
| 19 | 3 | "What a Mess!" | TBA |
| 19 | 3 | "But We're Not Tired" | TBA |
| 20 | 4 | "Boo!" | TBA |
| 20 | 4 | "Quiet, Dad and Lea are Sick!" | TBA |
| 21 | 5 | "I Don't Like Parents Arguing" | TBA |
| 21 | 5 | "Ow, It Hurts!" | TBA |
| 22 | 6 | "Nana and Papi are Lost!" | TBA |
| 22 | 6 | "I Want to Race" | TBA |
| 23 | 7 | "Old Toys Are Fun!" | TBA |
| 23 | 7 | "Yum Yum, It's Dinner Time!" | TBA |
| 24 | 8 | "It's a Fun Party!" | TBA |
| 24 | 8 | "I'm Not Having Fun" | TBA |
| 25 | 9 | "I'm Making New Friends" | TBA |
| 25 | 9 | "Wow! It's Not So Easy!" | TBA |
| 26 | 10 | "Nooo, I Want to See the Movie!" | February 23, 2008 |
| 26 | 10 | "Yahoo! It's Christmas!" | February 23, 2008 |

== Awards ==
Bali received the top prize in the animation category at the 2005 MIPCOM Jr. It had won awards at the Prix Gémeaux Awards and Argentina's Cordoba Intl. Animation Festival - ANIMA.

== In other media ==
=== Books ===
The book series the television series is based on was written by Magdalena Richard and Laurent Richard, and was published by Editions Flammarion:

- Bali fait du vélo
- Bali et Kikou, au bain!
- Bali va à l'école
- Bali dit non
- Bali et ses petits trésors
- Mon livre jeu Bali-Bali en vacances
- Bali attend Noël
- Bali a la varicelle
- Bali va chez Nanou
- Bali va à la mer
- Soun dort chez Bali
- Bali a un nouveau lit N. éd.
- Bali pique-nique à la maison N. éd.
- Bali prend son bain
- Bali a un nouveau lit
- Bali a une baby-sitter
- Bali joue à cache-cache
- Les plus belles histoires de Bali
- Bali a la varicelle

=== Stage show ===
Bali has had a stage show run in Paris called "Pakita Chante Bali".
