= Bug Bites (2016 TV series) =

- Created by: Adam Lazarus; Topher Putnam
- Directed by: Corryl Parr; Topher Putnam
- Starring: Adam Lazarus; Topher Putnam
- Voices of: Topher Putnam; Chloe Bailey
- Country of origin: United States
- Original language: English
- No. of seasons: 1
- No. of episodes: 26

Production
- Executive producer: Jeffrey A. Stern
- Running time: 28.46 minutes
- Production companies: Bug Bites Productions, LLC; Putnam Stern Enterprises; Alegra Entertainment

Original release
- Network: Syndication via American Public Television, KCET
- Release: January 4 – June 27, 2016

Bug Bites is an American children's television series created by Adam Lazarus and Topher Putnam, distributed by American Public Television. The series centers on a scientist, Adam Lazarus, and his animated cockroach sidekick Gilbert the Roach as they learn about life while investigating the world of bugs. Among the issues they deal with are friendship, innovation, and everyone's uniqueness.
