= Wild Animal Baby =

American children's nature magazine

- Categories: Nature
- Frequency: 10 per year
- First issue: 1990
- Final issue: 2012
- Company: National Wildlife Federation
- Country: United States
- Based in: Reston, Virginia
- Language: English
- Website: www.nwf.org/wildanimalbaby
- ISSN: 1526-047X

Wild Animal Baby was a magazine for children published by the National Wildlife Federation. The magazine was targeted to children ages 2–4, and consisted of readings, pictures, and games designed to teach children about animals. The National Wildlife Federation also publishes Ranger Rick and Your Big Backyard, which are geared towards older children.

Wild Animal Baby was based in Reston, Virginia and each issue featured a particular animal on the cover, and has multiple features that recur in each issue. "Out and About" follows the adventures of a variety of children from different cultures. A "search" page appeared in each issue where children are directed to find animals from a list within the picture. The mascot "Sammy Skunk" appears on five pages throughout the magazine for children to try to find.

Wild Animal Baby, along with Big Backyard, was discontinued in December 2012. The two magazines merged to create a new magazine called Ranger Rick Jr.

== Television series ==
The magazine characters were also featured in the CGI-animated children's television series Wild Animal Baby Explorers. The series ran three seasons with a total of 52 episodes, each lasting approximately 11 minutes, which originally aired from September 26, 2010, to January 7, 2014. The show was produced as a collaboration between the National Wildlife Federation and Xing Xing Digital Corporation.

Aimed at children aged two to five, the series focuses on four main wildlife characters whose magical journeys take them all over the globe to learn about habitats far and wide.
