= The Swamp Critters of Lost Lagoon =

- Left to right: Big Al Gator, Billy Bob Possum, Gumbo Fiddler Crab, Ribbit E. Lee, Ima Dilla, and Joe Raccoon
- Genre: Education; Children's
- Created by: Bobby Goldsboro
- Written by: Bobby Goldsboro
- Voices of: Bobby Goldsboro
- Theme music composer: Bobby Goldsboro
- Opening theme: "Rollin' Down to Lost Lagoon"
- Composer: Bobby Goldsboro
- Country of origin: United States
- Original language: English
- No. of seasons: 3

Original release
- Network: Syndication (seasons 1-2); INSP (season 3)
- Release: February 3, 1996 – January 27, 2001

The Swamp Critters of Lost Lagoon (originally named Swamp Critters) is an American children's television series created by country music star Bobby Goldsboro. Targeted for children aged 2 to 8, the show featured characters brought to life by actors. The program aired on public television stations, TLC, and INSP from 1996 to 2001, and according to the show's website (which is partially outdated), it formerly aired on the now-defunct America One Television Network and currently on TCT Kids.

== Characters ==
=== Non-television series band ===
- William Robert "Billy Bob/Will" Possum (lead singer, bass player, tambourine, harmonica) the problem solver of the group.
- Karina Desire "Kari/K.D." Watson (second lead singer, tambourine, soniator guitar/guitar, drums) the cheerful member of the group.
- Rancid DuBois (bass player, keyboard, vocals) {Currently}
- Joseph "Joe" Raccoon (banjo/guitar, harmonica, saxophone, vocals)
- Gumbo the Fiddler Crab (fiddle/violin, vocals)
- Todd Bender (bass player, vocals, cameraman)
- Ribbit E. Lee (drums, vocals)
- Ima Dilla Armadillo (tambourine, dancer, vocals)
- Chase Isben (bass player, keyboard, vocals) {Episode 1 - 27}
- Alouisious "Big Al Gator" Reptilicus (piano, accordion, vocals)

=== Misc. puppet characters, critters (TV series) and other ===
- T. Bone Willie
- Slim Pig
- Bobby Q. Pig
- Cashew Squirrel
- Melvis Weasley
- Picasso "Speedy" Cottontail as the Easter Bunny and Kari's BFFA
- Lumpkin the Pumpkin
- Stinger
- Patience
- Henrietta Hen
- Stormy Weathers
- Dr. Betterfeel
- Sam and Ethel Watson as Mason's Parents and Kari's Grandparents
- Shecky Dangerfield-Mouse
- Snorkle Elephant
- Frank Possum as Suzy Ann's husband, Joel and D.J.'s father and Billy Bob's brother-in-law
- Mason Watson as Kari's Widowed Father and Sam & Ethel's Son
- Harry Bear
- Mya Raccoon as Joe's younger sister
- Suzy Ann Possum as Billy Bob's older sister, Joel and D.J.'s mother and Frank's wife
- Willie Hank "Country" Weston
- Freada Dyle as Big Al's girlfriend
- Granny Muskrat
- Bonnie and the Bunnies
- Michelle Possum as Billy Bob's girlfriend with a French accent
- Phinneas Phatrat
- William Snakespear
- Rosemary Phatrat as Phineas' twin sister and Farley's mother
- Farley Phatrat as Phineas' nephew
- Lil' Rock Raccoon as Joe's nephew and Mya's son
- Joel Possum as Billy Bob's nephew and Frank & Suzy Ann's son
- Dorothy-Jane "D.J." Possum as Billy Bob's niece and Frank and Suzy Ann's daughter
- Lil' Pedro as Big Al's next restaurant neighbor
- Chanel Skunk as Lil' Pedro's business partner
- Jefferson Opossum as Pioneer, Billy Bob and Suzy Ann's great-great grandfather

=== TV Cast, crew and performers ===
- Bobby Goldsboro (Creator, Writer, voices, music, lyrics, composer)
- Dan Peeler (Director)
- "Swamp Critters" Designed & Constructed by Peeler-Rose Productions
- Jim Demetrius (actor) as Ribbit E. Lee, Melvis Weasley, produced sets, and props construction (TV series)
- Dianne Goldsboro (actor) as Ima Dilla (TV series)
- Joe "Mudfish" Hitch (actor) as Big Al Gator (TV series)
- Jeff Maddux (actor) as Joe Raccoon, puppeteer (TV series)
- Charlie Rose (actor) as Billy Bob Possum, puppeteer, Dallas producer, (TV series)
- Paul Taylor (actor) as Joe Raccoon (TV series pilot)
- "Swamp Critters" Designed & Constructed by Peeler-Rose Productions (TV series)
- Cowan Costumes - additional costumes
- Becky Sander-Cedarlof - additional costumes
- Bill Overton - additional costumes
- Bob Hoak - Technical Director, Editor (WEDU - Florida)
- Francisco M. Vega - Stage Manager, lighting, (WEDU - Florida)
- Garripoli Designs - Computer Graphics
- The Stokes Group - Computer Graphics
- Douglas Darracott - Background Illustrator
- Michael Rizzo - Camera
- Dan Vehorn - Camera
- Stephen Beaumont - Camera
- Mike Apsey - Audio
- George Czkwianianc - Audio
- Francisco M. Vega - Stage Manager
- Greg Hollingsworth - Video
- Hector Rodriguez - Video
- Richard Hagen - Video
- Ivan Benson - Videotape
- Taped & Edited - WEDU Studios, Tampa, Florida

== Development ==
Goldsboro funded the show using his own money instead of getting investors to back it. According to him, "the minute somebody puts in money, they think they have the right to say, 'You know, Barney is so successful, why don't you make that alligator purple instead of green?' I've got enough to worry about without having to appease somebody else." Goldsboro also decided to start the show on a PBS affiliate rather than on a network affiliate. According to him, if he had gone to a network he "would have had to have a lot more action on the show. On the network shows, everything is fast cuts and fast movements. They think that's what kids want to see in this day and age of video games". Swamp Critter actor Charlie Rose (Billy Bob Possum and puppeteer), says "The pilot episode was produced in December 1995 at WEDU. Our company, Peeler-Productions, had spent the early part of that year designing and building the character costumes, heads, puppets, providing set designs to actor Jim Demetrius (Ribbit E. Lee) who doubled as set builder for Effects International in Florida." The rest of season 1 was produced in early 1996 and was broadcast the following spring. The same is true for the second season. In fall of 1996, the second season was in production, and made its first broadcast in the spring of 1997. The first two seasons aired in reruns on TLC's Ready Set Learn! block from 1997 to 1999. The reruns moved to INSP in 1999, where a third season was broadcast between fall of 2000 and spring of 2001.

== Music ==
Each half-hour episode contains four to six songs, ranging from blues and Dixieland jazz to pop and classical and country music. For the first two seasons, over 100 songs were written. According to Goldsboro, "it's music that's on a children's show but it's not children's music. I've never understood talking down to kids and treating them like they're imbeciles. Several shows do that."

== Animatronics ==
Each of the main characters' costume heads contains over $20,000 worth of animatronics, which are used to control their eye blinks, and mouth movements. Credited as "Crittertronics Servos" by Hawes Corporation.
