= Harriet's Magic Hats =

Canadian television series

Harriet's Magic Hats was a Canadian television series created by ACCESS TV which aired in Canada from 1980–1986.

The premise of the show was that an aunt named Harriet has a trunk full of magic hats in her attic. When her young niece wears a hat from the trunk she is transported to a place related to the hat. For example, if she wore a chef's hat from the trunk, the girl was transported to a kitchen with professional chefs, where she would learn about the profession. The show was 15 minutes long, and gave children a diverse view of the working world.

== Cast ==
- Lynne Thornton as Aunt Harriet
- Sharon Holownia as Susan
- Frank C. Turner as Ralph the Parrot (Seasons 1–2)
- Ronnie Burkett as Ralph the Parrot (Seasons 3–4)
- Sarah C.R. Makins as Mandy (Season 1)
- Jessica Owen as Jessie (Season 2)
- Carrie Cheverie as Carrie (Season 4)

== Writers ==
Episodes 1 - 26: Donaleen Saul

Episodes 27 - 52: Bob Swift-Hill
