= Storylords =

Instructional television series

Storylords is a 1984 low-budget live-action instructional television series shown on educational and PBS member stations in the United States, often during instructional television blocks. It was produced at the University of Wisconsin–Stout for the Wisconsin Educational Communications Board.

== General summary ==
Storylords consists of twelve 15-minute programs which focus on building reading comprehension strategies through the use of fantasy. The storyline consists of a young boy named Norbert who has been apprenticed by Lexor – an old Storylord from the land of Mojuste – to defend Mojuste's citizens against the wicked Storylord, Thorzuul. Thorzuul seeks to turn all of those who can't understand what they read into stone statues for his collection.

The first few episodes follow a basic formula: first, Norbert is summoned by Lexor through a magic ring to enter the land of Mojuste and help a certain citizen solve a riddle or word puzzle given by Thorzuul. He then travels to Mojuste via the "Bike-o-Tron" (a magical stationary exercise bike in his garage), while chanting:

Thunder and Lightning, Trumpets and Drums, Readers Rejoice, A Storylord Comes!

In Mojuste, Norbert meets with Thorzuul's potential victim. By recalling a recent lesson from his teacher, Mrs. Framish, he helps the citizen solve the riddle just in time before Thorzuul arrives on his motorcycle (driven by his chauffeur, Milkbreath) and discovers that his plans have been thwarted.

About halfway through the series, Norbert's sister, Mandy, becomes curious about her brother's secret life and decides to follow him to the garage. She touches him, just as he is traveling to Mojuste on the Bike-o-Tron and is transported to the land with him, later to become his assistant.

In the last four episodes, Thorzuul decides to stop targeting Mojuste's citizens and instead uses his schemes against Norbert and Mandy themselves.

There is an exhibit features original costumes, props and photographs, as well as interactive experiences. This exhibit is at the Rassbach Museum in Menomonie, WI. Check out a 1980's classroom, and hop on the Bike-O-Tron to be transported to the magical land of Mojuste. Learn about the making of the show, and all of the magical places in Dunn County that were featured in the show. Rassbach Museum Storylords exhibit

== Main cast ==
- Colm O'Reilly—Norbert Niesenden
- Tanya Tiffany—Mandy
- Mike Nelms—Jason
- Karin Worthley—Mrs Framish
- Alexis Lauren—Lexor
- Larry Laird—Thorzuul
- Dennis Fenichel—Milkbreath

== Production credits ==
- Producer/Director - Ed Jakober
- Writer - Jed MacKay
- Program Development - Tom DeRose
- Production Manager - Tim Fuhrmann
- Music Written and performed by: Dave Roll
- Art Director - Annette Proehl
- Audio - Larry Roeming, Jim Guenther
- Production Engineers - Ron Heinecke, Pat Allickson
- Studio Manager - Louis Rivard
- Production Assistants - Bill Moran, Paul Hed

== Episodes ==
1. Activating Prior Knowledge Before Reading
2. Connecting What You Know With What's On The Page
3. Knowing When You Don't Know (In Your Head)
4. Knowing When You Don't Know (On The Page)
5. Directed Reading-Thinking Activity
6. Question-Answer Relationships
7. Decoding Words in Context
8. Inferring Word Meaning in Context
9. Story Mapping
10. Pronoun Anaphora
11. Identifying Main Idea and Details
12. Integrating Comprehension Strategies

== Criticism ==
Storylords was allegedly criticized by a conservative educator for its emphasis on the whole language method of learning reading skills, rather than through the use of phonics.

Phyllis Schlafly commented on her political activism website, the Eagle Forum, that the series tells kids to "skip over" words they can't pronounce, and instead try to figure out their meanings through pictures or context clues. She concluded that, "With these mischievous instructions, children will never be able to read books unless there are pictures on every page."
