= Hello Mrs. Cherrywinkle =

Canadian children's television series

- Also known as: Bonjour Madame Croque-Cerise (1999–2003)
- Created by: Bernice Vanderlann; Annabel Slaight
- Starring: Kathy Robinson (seasons 1–2); Nina Keogh (seasons 1–2); Fred Sunson (seasons 1–2); Bob Stutt (seasons 1–2); Jason Wodlinger (seasons 1–2); Johnie Chase (seasons 1–2); Catherine Pinard (seasons 3–6); Claude Prégent (seasons 3–6); Michel P. Ranger (seasons 3–6); Sylvie Comtois (seasons 3–6); Line Boucher (seasons 3–6)
- Country of origin: Canada
- No. of seasons: 6
- No. of episodes: 143

Production
- Executive producers: Annabel Slaight; Sylvie Bergeron
- Producer: Bernice Vanderlann
- Running time: 24-25 minutes
- Production companies: Coscient Group (1997–1999); Owl/SDA Productions (1997–1999); Motion International (1999–2000); Zone 3 (2000–2003)

Original release
- Network: Family Channel (1997–1999); Télé-Québec (1999–2003)
- Release: February 3, 1997 – November 28, 2003

Hello Mrs. Cherrywinkle is a Canadian children's television program that aired from February 3, 1997, to March 26, 1999, on the Family Channel. It centered on the adventures of the title character, Mrs. Cherrywinkle (portrayed by Kathy "Babe" Robinson, of Philadelphia, PA), a stout woman full of energy who interacted with a variety of puppets in her home and garden. The puppets used in the show were created by Noreen Young & Matt Ficner.

Songs for the series were written by Randy Vancourt and Tim Burns.

The show's format was adapted for the French network Télé-Québec from September 13, 1999, to November 28, 2003. American Public Television acquired the show in 1999 for U.S. distribution, with Time-Life Kids obtaining home video rights; Motion International planned to produce more episodes of the show for public television stations if it was successful; however, that would not happen.

== Episodes ==
=== Series overview ===
| Season | Episodes | Originally released | |
| Season | Episodes | First released | Last released |
|---|---|---|---|
| 1 | 13 | February 3, 1997 | November 28, 1997 |
| 2 | 26 | September 28, 1998 | March 26, 1999 |
| 3 | 26 | September 12, 1999 | June 16, 2000 |
| 4 | 26 | September 11, 2000 | May 25, 2001 |
| 5 | 26 | September 10, 2001 | March 29, 2002 |
| 6 | 26 | September 16, 2002 | November 28, 2003 |

| No. overall | No. in season | Title | Original release date |
|---|---|---|---|
| TBA | TBA | "A Busy Day" | TBA |
Everyone else's problems interrupt Mrs. Cherrywinkle's day to relax.
| TBA | TBA | "A Case of the Giggles" | TBA |
While Mrs. Cherrywinkle, Murray and Fish prepare for the big Ho Ho Ho Down, Kitty searches for her lost sock puppy. Captain Dinghy stops by with a rare Giggle Lily, which gives anyone who sniffs it a case of the giggles. To protect themselves from the uncontrollable laughing, Mrs. Cherrywinkle and the Cherrychums create decorated egg-carton noses. Neddy Beedlebum also stops by in the midist of the activity. The Ho Ho Ho Down ultimately leads to a song and dance routine.
| TBA | TBA | "Murray Gets Mobile" | TBA |
Murray crashes the new kitty cycle.
| TBA | TBA | "School Days" | TBA |
Fish has first-day jitters about school.
| TBA | TBA | "Can't Stop Dancing" | TBA |
A pair of magical shoes sets Mrs. Cherrywinkle's feet into motion.
| TBA | TBA | "Missing Admiral" | TBA |
Admiral Quackers leaves Captain Dinghy in charge while he is away.
| TBA | TBA | "Blizzardy Blues" | TBA |
Neddy conjures up a snow storm but cannot make it stop.
| TBA | TBA | "The Hickory Dickory Docker" | TBA |
Captain Dinghy's boat takes Fish and Kitty back to when they were babies.
| TBA | TBA | "I Could Play All Day" | TBA |
Game day; Kitty loses her self-esteem.
| TBA | TBA | "Kitty's Rival" | TBA |
Mrs. Cherrywinkle kitty-sits Poofy, and Kitty becomes jealous.
| TBA | TBA | "Kitty the Lion" | TBA |
Kitty dreams of being a lion.
| TBA | TBA | "Murray in Love" | TBA |
Murray tries to make a daisy notice his love for her.
| TBA | TBA | "The Fairest of Them All" | TBA |
Murray spruces up Mrs. Cherrywinkle's garden.
| TBA | TBA | "Wet Paint" | TBA |
Murray paints a picture of Mrs. Cherrywinkle.
| TBA | TBA | "I Can't Wait" | TBA |
Circus day; Kitty walks a tightrope; Fish becomes a magician.
| TBA | TBA | "Mrs. C. TV." | TBA |
Captain Dinghy's friends want Cherryville on their televisions.
| TBA | TBA | "Big Switch" | TBA |
Murray and Mrs. Cherrywinkle trade places to see what it is like to be different.
| TBA | TBA | "Kitty and the Wild Wind" | TBA |
Captain Dinghy captures a wild wind, and Kitty lets it loose.
| TBA | TBA | "Hiccup-and-Down" | TBA |
Neddy disappears every time he hiccups.
| TBA | TBA | "Lost and Found" | TBA |
Captain Dinghy's voice runs away from him.
| TBA | TBA | "To the Moon" | TBA |
Kitty and Fish get into trouble when they fly a kite by themselves.
