= Bloopy's Buddies =

Children's television show, 1996 to 1998

Bloopy's Buddies is a children's television show which aired on PBS from 1996 to 1998. It also aired in syndication.
