= Marshall Izen =

American actor

Marshall Izen was an American entertainer whose performances combined puppetry and playing the piano.

== Early years ==
Izen was the son of Mr. and Mrs. Morris Izen who owned a shoe store on the northwest side of Chicago. When Izen was four years old, he began picking out melodies of songs on his grandmother's piano. At age seven, he developed an obsessive fear of the dark, which led to his parents' buying (based on a psychologist's advice) a pair of puppets, a stage, and a toy film projector for him. He went on to incorporate puppets into his performances.

While Izen was a student, he entertained at parties, school functions, and meetings of women's clubs. In 1950, he won a talent contest on the Arthur Godfrey's Talent Scouts program, which led to a two-week engagement on stage with Godfrey at the Chicago Theatre.

Izen was a graduate of Emmet Grammar School and Austin High School. He attended Northwestern University but left in 1943 to enlist in the U. S. Army, serving in Europe with the 104th Infantry Division and entertaining troops. After World War II, Izen studied at the Juilliard School of Music, following which he went to DePaul University, graduating with a bachelor of arts degree with a music major.

Izen also pursued his interest in art, earning a scholarship to the Art Institute of Chicago while he was in grammar school and studying there later.

== Entertainment career ==
Izen debuted professionally as a supper-club entertainer in New York. He went from there to perform in supper clubs and night clubs across the United States. His act combined playing the piano and providing laughs for the audience, featuring segments in which he manipulated puppets on top of the piano while playing the instrument with one hand.

He went on to retain the piano-puppetry combination later in appearances on television and in concerts. Izen made the puppets' costumes and the settings in which they appeared atop the piano, with the settings designed to complement the themes of the songs he performed. Cast in plastic wood from clay molds, the puppets were patterned after well-known performers in opera and concerts. His more than 50 characters included a pianist with white hair who played a miniature Steinway.

In 1959-1960, he was a regular on the children's TV program Wonderama in New York. In addition to playing piano and working puppets, he told stories and enhanced some of the stories and songs with chalk-talk illustrations.

In the summer of 1960, Izen had his first concert tour, with 20 appearances at colleges and universities in the southern and midwestern United States. The performances consisted of part serious music and part his trademark combination of music, puppets, and humor.

In the 1960s, Izen and Jane Norman were puppeteers for Tottle, a half-hour children's program on WCAU-TV in Philadelphia. The show ran for five years and, beginning in April 1962, it was also carried on WBBM-TV in Chicago.

In the 1970s, Izen made a national tour sponsored by New York's PART Foundation in association with groups supporting the arts in cities in which he appeared. The concerts were oriented toward children ages 5 to 12. In addition to the usual combination of music, puppets, and comedy, Izen showed the youngsters how they could create puppets and other items for entertainment out of everyday materials, such as newspapers, that they could find at home. He continued touring and giving similar programs in the 1980s, adding elements that introduced 20th century artists' work to the audience in an effort to "bring out the Picasso in the kids", Izen said.

Izen made several albums for children for Columbia Records.

== Art and writing ==
Pastel chalk drawings by Izen were exhibited in art shows and were sold in stores, including I. Magnin in San Francisco and Los Angeles and Bergdorf Goodman in New York. In the early 1960s, he began working with Hallmark Cards, creating puppets and cards for their children-oriented product line.

Izen and puppeteer Jim West were co-authors of two picture books for children.

== Recognition ==
CBS-TV devoted an episode of the program Camera Three to Izen and his work.

"The Adventures of Coslo", a mini-series broadcast on WTTW-TV in Chicago, won two Emmy Awards — Outstanding Individual Achievement and Outstanding Children's Programming — for Izen.

Izen's The Isle of Joy, an animated film based on cutouts of Matisse, won the international CINE Golden Eagle Award, and his 30-minute TV program won awards from McCall's magazine and Ohio University.

The Dog Who Sang at the Opera, a picture book by Izen and Jim West, won the Parents Choice Award.

Izen died on May 26, 2015, at the age of 90.
