= Sheira & Loli's Dittydoodle Works =

American children's television series

- Genre: Children's television series
- Starring: Season 1: Julie Smith; Claudine O'Rourke; Janeece Freeman; Eric Engelhardt; Heidi Mitrushi; Daniel Weissbrodt; Tyler Bunch; Sheira & Leora "Loli" Brayer (vocals); Season 2: Brittany Moore; Elena Schloss; Whitney Crites; Tammy Paulino; Kevin Steele; Steve Robbins; Daniel Weissbrodt
- Country of origin: United States
- Original language: English
- No. of seasons: 2
- No. of episodes: 40

Production
- Running time: 30 minutes
- Production company: Rogar Studios

Original release
- Network: PBS Kids, WLIW
- Release: 2005 – 2009

Sheira and Loli's Dittydoodle Works is an American half-hour weekly children's television series for preschoolers that aired in the mid-2000s. The series is produced by Rogar Studios, in association with WLIW in New York City.

Originating in a magical musical factory, rag doll twin sisters Sheira and Loli are the hosts in the world they share with their friends: resident visual artist Miss Molly, Doodles the wise-cracking talking purple crayon, eccentric but brilliant Professor named Professor Eeky Eeky Kronk, the troublemaking but good-natured yellow reptile-like creature named Zippy the Kwirk, and the childlike factory helpers, Professor Squeeky Squeeky Kronk (introduced in season 2) and two little furball characters known as the Funkins (Bluedles and Pink-a-Dink).

Celebrity guests for the first season include pianist/composer Marvin Hamlisch, who helps a discouraged Loli with her piano lessons in "Practice, Patience and Persistence" (episode #104), and R&B singer Chaka Khan as Mother Nature in "4 Leaf Clover" (episode #115).

Sheira and Loli's Dittydoodle Works features music written and performed by the real-life inspiration for the series' main characters, twins Sheira and Loli Brayer. The sisters' performances on Sheira and Loli's Ditties for Little Kiddies-Volume #1, and Dittydoodle Works Celebrates the Holidays garnered two iParenting Media Awards. The show was approved by Common Sense Media.

The characters' diverse personalities are designed to provide opportunities to teach positive emotional, social, and educational lessons as young viewers learn, along with the characters, about self-esteem, cooperation, relationships, fitness, and concepts about nature, the physical world, and literacy.

== Background ==
The characters were introduced to public television audiences on WLIW as a series of music video shorts, bumpers, and segments in between children's programs, which were nominated for a New York Emmy and received a New York State Broadcasters Award in 2001. The creative team includes veterans of some of the most notable and award-winning productions to come out of Broadway, dance, film, and public and cable television. The team includes Mark Saltzman, a former writer at Sesame Street for nearly a decade; Alan Adelman, lighting designer of numerous television and stage productions, including Alvin Ailey American Dance Theater, Great Performances, Live from Lincoln Center, and more; and Dean Gordon of the popular PBS children's series Between the Lions. Joseph Baker, one of Broadway's most sought-after composers and arrangers, oversees the series' music with Sheira Brayer and her identical twin sister, Leora Brayer. Baker has worked on such Broadway hits as Les Misérables, The Phantom of the Opera, and The Lion King.

== Cast ==
- Sheira: Julie Smith (Season 1) / Brittany Moore (Season 2)
- Loli: Claudine O'Rourke (Season 1) / Elena Schloss (Season 2)
- Professor Eeky Eeky Kronk: Steve Robbins
- Miss Molly: Janeece Freeman
- Bluedles: Brittany Moore (Season 1) / Whitney Crites (Season 2)
- Pink-a-Dink: Heidi Mitrushi (née Hanson) (Season 1) / Tammy Paulino (Season 2)
- Professor Squeeky Squeeky Kronk: Kevin Steele (Season 2)
- Puppeteers: Eric Engelhardt (Season 1)
- Puppeteers: H.D. Quinn (Season 1)
- Puppeteers: Daniel Weissbrodt (Season 1, 2 + all online content)
- Vocals: Sheira & Leora "Loli" Brayer

== Episode guide ==
Season 1

1. Sheira’s Pen Pal
2. Feelings and Communication
3. Imagination
4. Practice, Patience and Persistence
5. Shrinky Shrinky Kronk
6. My Froggy The Prince
7. Make It Write
8. You Are What You Eat
9. Tis Better To Give
10. Pilfered Piggy
11. Moods
12. Sick of Being Sick
13. Better To Be Kind
14. Senses
15. 4 Leaf Clover
16. Together or Alone?
17. Professor Pedro
18. Froggy My Love
19. Sportsmanship
20. Who Switched the Switcher?
21. Halfway Around the World to be with Friends
22. Be What You Want To Be
23. Peer Pressure
24. Have No Fear
25. Be My Own Kwirk
26. Memories

Season 2

1. Meet Squeeky
2. Dear Diary
3. Not Now
4. No Lies
5. Sacrifice
6. Camping
7. Make Room for Zimbot
8. Procrastination
9. Sharing
10. Laughter Heels
11. Pay Attention
12. Where'd I Put It?
13. Betty Rose
14. Since You've Been Gone

== Merchandise ==
Merchandise has been released for the show, including t-shirts, plush dolls of Sheira and Loli and The Funkins, tattoos, DVDs, CDs, paperback books and activity books. Prior to the series start, in late 2000, when the duo was first featured on WLIW, a VHS was released based on all music videos that were shown in between the children's programs.
