= The Dooley and Pals Show =

- Also known as: The Dooley and Pals Show: Children's Ministry
- Genre: Children's television series Educational
- Created by: Mark Riddle
- Developed by: Kevin Barry, Gary Zeidenstein
- Written by: Ken Jones, Suzanne Fitzpatrick
- Starring: Ken Jones; David Maida; Michael Stevens
- Opening theme: "Here Comes Dooley"
- Ending theme: "Great Day" "Here Comes Dooley" (instrumental)
- Composer: Glenn Longacre
- Country of origin: United States
- Original language: English
- No. of episodes: 39

Production
- Executive producer: Mark Riddle
- Producers: Mark Riddle; Gary Zeidenstein; Ken Jones; Suzanne Fitzpatrick
- Production locations: Disney-MGM Studios Park, Orlando, Florida
- Production companies: Victory Television (PBS prints); Wardley Investments, Ltd. (Children's Ministry prints); The New York Networks Incorporated; SCETV

Original release
- Network: Syndication
- Release: April 3 – May 25, 2000

The Dooley and Pals Show, sometimes shortened to just Dooley and Pals, is an American children's television series.

The main character is Dooley, a friendly alien who has landed in a backyard on Earth. He explores the planet with the children of the neighborhood as his guides. The show is meant to teach moral values and educational basics to preschoolers.

The secular version is produced by the Michael Gerber-fronted Victory Television for South Carolina ETV, while one of Victory's shareholders, the Channel Islands-based Wardley Investments, Ltd., produced a 2002 repackaging of the original PBS program, albeit with religious messages.

== Development and production ==
Dooley, originally called "Dinky," was first developed in the late 1980s by Mark Riddle and Kevin Barry. The concept was pitched to several production companies, including Hanna-Barbera. Along with Gary Zeidenstein, Riddle and Barry eventually formed Mr. Z's Animation and Production Corp, and along with Scripps Howard Broadcasting produced ten television pilots at WCET, PBS's Cincinnati outlet. The ten pilots for the series (then called The Dooley Show) aired in 25 PBS stations between July 15 and August 31, 1996. This first Dooley series won three Emmys. While some ideas used in the pilots would later return in The Dooley and Pals Show, the basic premise, and Dooley himself, differed greatly. The original Dooley was a green lizard-like creature. According to the pilots' press release he was "species unknown... he's just a friend, another kid, but not from this world... he was born on a star." The ten pilots found Maxx (then played by Caralyn Collar) and her six friends playing with Dooley in the attic of Maxx's home. Other characters included Coach (a barn owl), Chatter (a squirrel), Polly (an opossum), and Parker (a bird). Maxx's grandmother, as well as a magical mail carrier, were also featured strongly. Dooley was originally played by Ken Jones. Jones served as the head writer for the series as well as the voice for Dooley and other characters including Coach and Cosmos. Suzanne Fitzpatrick served as the supervising producer during the development of the series at Disney/MGM Studios transitioning Dooley from the original 'dinosaur' concept to the space boy.

The secular version is syndicated to educational and PBS member stations by South Carolina ETV. The show was later purchased by MGM Studios/Walt Disney Company and was produced in Orlando, Florida until 2003 when production was canceled.

== Characters ==
- Dooley (Ken Jones, David Maida): An alien who has landed his spaceship in the backyard of a house on Earth. He wants to learn all about the people and environment of Earth, while teaching the children of the neighborhood about interpersonal skills.
- M.A.R.T.I.E. (Michael Stevens): "Mechanical Assistant Robot That Interacts with Everyone"—M.A.R.T.I.E. for short—is Dooley's robot sidekick, who has a tendency to mangle words. He has a data bank filled with facts about Earth concepts, which he accesses whenever Dooley needs more information about an idea.
- Cosmos (Ken Jones) and Zoom (Michael Stevens): A pair of fuzzy alien stowaways (represented by puppets) who appear in comical interstitials throughout the show, illustrating the main lessons.
- Mom (Ginger Lee McDermott): The mother who lives in the house where Dooley landed his spaceship. She acts as a voice of experience and guidance as Dooley, M.A.R.T.I.E. and the children learn various lessons.
- Nick (Joshua Gangelhoff): The boy who lives in the house; Mom's son and Maxx's brother. Some people call him Nicholas.
- Maxx (Erika Brooke Bradley): The girl who lives in the house; Mom's daughter and Nick's sister. She was played by Caralyn Collar in the original pilots.
- Michael (Eric Battle): One of the children in the neighborhood.
- Chris (Justenn Notario): Maxx's youngest boyfriend.
- Kayla (Nicole Marion): The "new kid" in the neighborhood, who arrives in the first episode. She is Dr. Arvid's daughter.
- Ashley (Kaitlyn O'Fray): One of the neighborhood children, Maxx's oldest best friend and Nick's girlfriend.
- Ms. Z. (Davonda Simmons): The letter carrier for the neighborhood; she delivers Dooley's "Letter of the Day" (an actual physical representation of an alphabet letter, usually the first letter of the word that best describes the show's theme) and "Picture Pals" (viewer-submitted drawings which Dooley displays during this segment). Ms. Z also acts as a voice of wisdom and advisor to the group, often introducing solutions to their problems through songs.
- Dr. Arvid (Arvid Edward II): Kayla's father, a veterinarian who often stops by bringing an animal for the children to interact with.

== Episodes ==
No. overall	No. in season	Title	Original release date
1	1	"A New Friend"	April 3, 2000
When a new child moves into the neighborhood, Maxx is nervous about meeting her. With the help of Dooley and her friends, Maxx is able to recall when Dooley was the new "kid" on the block and eventually works up the courage to welcome the new friend to the neighborhood. Maxx, Dooley and their pals learn that we can become friends with all sorts of people, no matter how different or similar to us they are.
2	2	"A Safe Place"	April 4, 2000
After a near accident threatens M.A.R.T.I.E., Dooley and the gang decide to have a "Safety Day". The group learns about fire safety, protective gear and how to call 9-1-1. Dooley also stresses emotional safety by demonstrating how friends and family make each other feel safe.
3	3	"3 Ring Circus"	April 5, 2000
Maxx, Nick and friends return from the circus and tell Dooley all about it. Dooley wishes he could have gone with them to see the sights. To bring the circus to Dooley, the kids dress up and put on make-believe acts for him. While others perform, Nick practices his juggling act, failing again and again as he gets more nervous about going on. With everyone's encouragement, he shows great progress just by trying and learns that attempting new things is fun and takes practice.
4	4	"Be Good to Your Mother"	April 6, 2000
Mom has an endless list of chores and has to leave before she can finish her yard work. The kids enlist Dooley's help to finish Mom's gardening as a nice surprise to show that the people who care for us need care, too. In the process, they raise larger issues about cleaning up Mother Earth, learning that there are simple ways to care for the planet.
5	5	"Home Sweet Home"	April 7, 2000
As a change of pace, Dooley becomes the teacher and helps the kids explore space. As he teaches them about the planets, he becomes homesick for his own star. Maxx can empathize because she's nervous about leaving home for her first sleepover. They learn that it's natural to miss familiar things when away from home, but there are ways to make time away from home easier.
6	6	"The Four Seasons"	April 10, 2000
A change of season raises Dooley's curiosity when it affects Mom's garden. To learn more, the children and M.A.R.T.I.E. try to build a weather machine, learning how to appreciate nature's rhythms and respond to them.
7	7	"Surprise!"	April 11, 2000
On Dooley's birthday, the kids throw him his first-ever birthday party. M.A.R.T.I.E. feels left out because he wasn't born; he was assembled. The kids help M.A.R.T.I.E. by making him part of the fun as they learn how we all celebrate special events in different ways.
8	8	"Adventure"	April 12, 2000
Dooley's DooleyVision breaks down on a day when the kids plan to show him the wonders of the rainforest. Instead, the kids take Dooley on a rainforest tour... using the power of their imaginations.
9	9	"Work and Play"	April 13, 2000
When M.A.R.T.I.E.'s repair activities leave the spaceship a mess, Dooley is overwhelmed. The kids organize the clean up, but Nick decides not to join in. After missing out on a day of clean-up fun, he discovers that cooperation gets the job done faster so that everyone can play.
10	10	"See You Later"	April 14, 2000
When Chris announces he's moving, everyone must deal with the departure until they find out he's only moving across the street. The neighborhood friends learn that saying goodbye hurts, but there are ways to make it hurt less.
11	11	"The Grumpies"	April 17, 2000
Maxx is in a grumpy mood and it soon spreads to everyone. Dooley watches, dismayed, sure his friends are catching and passing on an illness called, "the grumpies". By the end of the day, the group learns that dealing openly with bad feelings helps resolve them faster.
12	12	"Family Circle"	April 18, 2000
When Dooley says he misses his family, the kids explore what a family is. Chris has a new sister on the way and is already feeling left out of her family, but Dooley and his pals discover that families come in all shapes and sizes. Though a family can change, it's still your family, and adding a new member doesn't mean your parents love you any less.
13	13	"Rainy Day Blues"	April 19, 2000
Everyone has to cancel plans for a picnic when it rains, but the kids find a way to have fun indoors. They learn that sometimes plans have to change, but we can overcome disappointment by coming up with new plans.
14	14	"Feeling Icky"	April 20, 2000
Nick isn't feeling well and has to go to the doctor. Dooley and M.A.R.T.I.E. are worried about him, but Kayla does her best to reassure her friends by role-playing a visit to the doctor. Together, they learn that knowing what to expect makes new experiences easier.
15	15	"Playing School"	April 21, 2000
M.A.R.T.I.E. is excited with how much he has learned about Earth and wants to learn more. The kids tell him that's what school is for. Since M.A.R.T.I.E. and Dooley can't go to school, Mom and the kids bring school to them.
16	16	"Mine, Mine, Mine!"	April 24, 2000
Maxx and Chris argue over who gets to choose what to watch on DooleyVision. Dooley and the kids help them work out a compromise so everyone can have fun, learning that when we share, everyone gets to have a turn to enjoy because friendship is more important than fighting.
17	17	"We Are All Special"	April 25, 2000
The kids are getting ready for a talent show, but Dooley feels bad because he doesn't have anything special to do for the show. The kids help him understand he's special for being who he is.
18	18	"Dooley's Missing Treasure"	April 26, 2000
Dooley is in a panic because he's lost his beloved stuffed toy named Hippleblat. The kids calm him down and help him mount a search, earth-style. Together, they learn when we put things away in the right place we can find them again next time.
19	19	"The Green-Eyed Monster"	April 27, 2000
Everyone comes to Dooley, complaining about some competitor's success. Dooley helps them through their bad feelings by showing them how they overcome jealousy on his planet. The friends learn that the success of others does not diminish us.
20	20	"Sweet Dooley Dreams"	April 28, 2000
When Dooley has trouble falling asleep, the kids show him ways to make a nighttime routine fun and easy.
21	21	"Sticks and Stones"	May 1, 2000
Nick and Maxx have a fight and call each other names, which hurts feelings. Dooley and the kids must help Nick and Maxx understand that words can hurt.
22	22	"Promises, Promises"	May 2, 2000
When Ashley promised to help Maxx with an art project and fails to appear, Maxx's feelings are hurt. The kids help Ashley understand the significance of a promise and how to promise only what can be delivered.
23	23	"Dooley Cries Wolf"	May 3, 2000
Dooley tells the kids of his log entries, which contain wild exaggerations and outright fabrications. When the kids question what he's doing, Dooley confesses that his daily log entries seem kind of dull. The kids help Dooley see that it's best to always tell the truth.
24	24	"A Snack to Remember"	May 4, 2000
Dooley and M.A.R.T.I.E. prepare a special meal for their new friends - a gourmet treat from his home. The kids are horrified but don't want to hurt Dooley's feelings. They procrastinate eating the new dish by taking care with their personal hygiene, utensils, manners, etc. Eventually, they can delay no more. They finally taste the odd concoction only to discover they actually like it, to Dooley's delight.
25	25	"Pet Responsibility"	May 5, 2000
After admiring one of the children's dog, M.A.R.T.I.E. decides a pony will make the perfect pet for Dooley. The children and the neighborhood vet Dr. Arvid must teach M.A.R.T.I.E. the responsibilities associated with having an animal.
26	26	"Taking Care of Business"	May 8, 2000
The kids would rather play than clean the yard, but when Dooley trips and nearly hurts himself, the children learn that it's important to take care of responsibilities - and when working with a friend or two, work can be play.
27	27	"The Great Pretender"	May 9, 2000
Mom reads a fairy tale to the kids and it triggers fantasies about making wishes. They take turns imagining themselves in different places. When M.A.R.T.I.E has trouble learning to use his imagination the kids teach him how to pretend.
28	28	"Dooley's New Shoes"	May 10, 2000
Chris gets new shoes, but he doesn't want to wear them; he likes his old shoes. Dooley decides to get new shoes, too, but also has trouble saying goodbye to his old shoes. The kids learn not to be afraid of change.
29	29	"The Five Senses"	May 11, 2000
When M.A.R.T.I.E.'s eye mechanisms go on the blink, the kids lend a helping hand and learn all about their amazing five senses.
30	30	"Things That Go Bump in the Spaceship"	May 12, 2000
When M.A.R.T.I.E. and Dooley think their spaceship is hunted, Nick and Michael seize the opportunity to play some "ghostly" tricks. The boys soon learn that having fun at the expense of others isn't really fun at all.
31	31	"Dance to Your Own Beat"	May 15, 2000
Dooley and his pals learn about rhythm in a day of song and dance. Chris is afraid he won't be able to dance as well as his friends, but soon learns that if he follows his own rhythm, he can never go wrong.
32	32	"Great Outdoors"	May 16, 2000
The gang is disappointed when they can't go along with Nick on his school camping trip. Mom saves the day with a backyard camp-out. Everyone has fun learning about the great outdoors.
33	33	"The Dentist"	May 17, 2000
When Michael gets braces on his teeth, Dooley is curious. The kids teach Dooley all about the dentist.
34	34	"We're All Different"	May 18, 2000
When Dooley and M.A.R.T.I.E. make another "alien faux pas," they are embarrassed about being different. Through a variety of examples, everyone learns that differences are what make life interesting. We can learn from our differences and enjoy the things we share.
35	35	"Monkey See, Monkey Do"	May 19, 2000
On the day that Dr. Arvid teaches the kids about primates, a game of "monkey see, monkey do" gets out of hand. Chris learns that he needs to think for himself, not blindly follow Nick. Nick learns that he can be a good role model for Chris.
36	36	"When the Chip is Down"	May 22, 2000
When M.A.R.T.I.E.'s memory chip gets stuck, the gang tries to fix him by jogging his memory with tales of the fun the group has shared.
37	37	"I Love a Parade"	May 23, 2000
The kids decide to march in their own parade, but trouble appears when Nick and Kayla both want to lead. In the end, they find a way to share center stage.
38	38	"A Safer Day"	May 24, 2000
When Dooley finds Nick, Mom and Maxx practicing a fire drill, he wants to learn more. The kids organize a "safety day" and everyone learns something new about safety at home.
39	39	"One Tin Robot Rides Away"	May 25, 2000
Pretending to be pirates, the kids follow clues to a hidden treasure. The clues remind them of many fun days playing in the backyard. M.A.R.T.I.E. learns that memories are a more valuable treasure than gold.
