= SeeMore's Playhouse =

- Genre: Educational; Musical
- Country of origin: United States
- Original language: English
- No. of seasons: 2
- No. of episodes: 30

Production
- Producers: Safety4Kids Entertainment; Edgeworx; Connecticut Public Television (season 1); Oregon Public Broadcasting (season 2)
- Running time: 30 minutes

Original release
- Network: Syndication
- Release: September 10, 2006 – January 15, 2008

SeeMore's Playhouse is an American children's television series using puppets to teach preschoolers about health and safety concepts.

== Characters ==
- SeeMore the Safety Seal - Puppeteered by Rafael Rodriguez
- Harry Hippo - Puppeteered by Eric Wright
- Shades Wolf - Puppeteered by Eric Wright in season 1, David Stephens in season 2
- Basil Wombat - Puppeteered by Kenneth Mark Berman in season 1, David Fino in season 2
- Lottie Lamb - Puppeteered by Lindsey "Z" Briggs
- Penny Pup - Puppeteered by Sarah Frechette
- Barb Porcupine - Puppeteered by Carole Simms D'Agostino (Barb only appeared in Season 1, she was dropped in Season 2)
- Various characters - Puppeteered by Mark Gale and others

== Segments ==
The show has a few recurring segments in every episode

=== It's Knock-Knock Time! ===
The puppets and guest celebrities will tell knock-knock jokes to other with a wall reminiscent of Rowan and Martin's Laugh-In.

=== An Adventure with Harry Hippo ===
This series follows Harry Hippo trying to navigate the world around him.

=== Songs ===
There are at least 2 songs in every episode. Every main puppet has sung at least once.

== Episodes ==
=== Season 1 (2006) ===
1. Hide and Seek (September 10, 2006)
2. Party Planners (September 17, 2006)
3. SeeMore Appreciation (September 24, 2006)
4. The Talent Show (October 1, 2006)
5. Make Believe (October 8, 2006)
6. Basil's Surprise (October 15, 2006)
7. Pool Yourself Together (October 22, 2006)
8. Nature Walk (October 29, 2006)
9. A Tale of Two Cyclists (November 5, 2006)
10. Rock Song (November 12, 2006)
11. Come on Team Play (November 19, 2006)
12. Penny's Playground (November 26, 2006)
13. 1-555-Vegetables (December 3, 2006)

=== Season 2 (2007–2008) ===
1. Power to Play (November 3, 2007)
2. The Pickle Hat (November 10, 2007)
3. Get Up, Get Out, Get Going (November 17, 2007)
4. Ready, Set, Snow! Disaster Preparedness (November 24, 2007)
5. Sweet & Sour (December 1, 2007)
6. I'm Bigger Than You (December 8, 2007)
7. Mrs. Bingley's Farm (December 15, 2007)
8. Cool Rules (December 22, 2007)
9. What's Cooking? (December 29, 2007)
10. Marching Orders (January 5, 2008)
11. Lost & Found (January 7, 2008)
12. No Peanuts, Please! (January 8, 2008)
13. Teacher's Pet (January 9, 2008)
14. Harry's Check-Up (January 10, 2008)
15. Lottie's Library Card (January 11, 2008)
16. Home Theater (January 14, 2008)
17. Take Me Out (January 15, 2008)

== Home media ==
Only 2 DVDs of the series were produced.

- Fire Safety
- Car and Pedestrian Safety

== Reception ==
Common Sense Media gave the show 3 out of 5 stars.
