= The Mother Company =

American media company

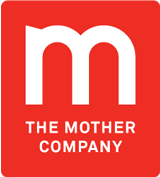
The Mother Company

The Mother Company is an American media company that produces television, web, and literary content for family audiences. The company is based in Los Angeles, California.

== History ==
Founder and CEO Abbie Schiller, a public relations executive and former VP with ABC and Kiehl's partnered with Samantha Kurtzman-Counter (President), a director and producer, who has worked on programs for ABC, CBS, NBC, Vh1, MTV and the Disney Channel. The Mother Company launched on Mother's Day, 2010. Together, Schiller and Kurtzman-Counter are known as “mothers on a mission to redefine children’s entertainment."

== Company Funding ==
Seeking business funding, Schiller initially approached angel investors. Because they wanted to give her more than twice the amount she needed, she turned down offers from three different traditional investment companies. Instead, Schiller and Kurtzman-Counter presented the company to mothers on the playground, at school events and birthday parties before establishing a niche group of individual investors in and around Los Angeles. All but one of the company's more than 20 investors is a mother and the founders have kept majority control.

The Mother Company's core product, the Emmy-winning educational TV series Ruby's Studio, is designed to entertain young children while helping them to develop essential pro-social skills and emotional intelligence. Live-action show host, Ruby (Played by Kelsey Collins), guides children as they explore everyday social-emotional challenges through animation, DIY craft projects, and original music. The children are also introduced to feelings through animated, art and musical segment inserts. Children's artists Elizabeth Mitchell and Lucky Diaz and the Family Jam Band are featured as musical guests.

== Development and poduction ==
The Mother Company has a development deal with eOne to develop live action content for teens and tweens. The companies have set their first two projects under the pact, one based on Howard Wallace, PI, the first book in a three-book series by Casey Lyall, and the other based on Anne Ursu's The Lost Girl, both executive produced by Drew Barrymore's Flower Films. Amanda Bowman Gerisch, VP, Scripted Development, Television at eOne is set to run point for the partnership.

== Awards and appearances ==
The Mother Company's products, Ruby's Studio and the companion book series, have won a wide range of awards. Ruby's Studio: The Siblings Show won the NATAS Mid-Atlantic Emmy in 2016 for Outstanding Children's Show. Other Awards include both Academic's Choice Smart Book and Smart Media Awards, multiple Creative Child Awards including DVD of the Year in 2012 and 2013, Red Tricycle's Coolest Kids Flick Award, a Parent's Choice Foundation Gold Award, National Parenting Publication Awards and the prestigious Cynopsis Kid's Imagination Award in 2014.

The Mother Company has appeared in publications such as People, Forbes, Examiner.com, and on local news stations across the country where they share lessons and values from their products and offer relevant tips to parents. Their products have been reviewed and recommended by publications such as Parents.Com, People, Common Sense Media, Style Cartel, and School Library Journal. The Mother Company's business story and their entrepreneurial success has attracted attention from outlets such as MSNBC, Entrepreneur, Bloomberg and FOX Business.
