= List of Phi Beta Kappa members =

This is a list of notable members of the Phi Beta Kappa who have Wikipedia biographies.

== Notable members elected as undergraduates ==
Name	Year	College or university	Ref.
Bushrod Washington	1778	College of William & Mary	
John Heath	1779	College of William & Mary	
Richard Bland Lee	1780	College of William & Mary	
John Marshall	1780	College of William & Mary	
James Kent	1781	Yale College	
Stephen Van Rensselaer	1782	Harvard University	
John Quincy Adams	1787	Harvard University	
Eli Whitney	1792	Yale College	
David Sherman Boardman	1792	Yale College	
Joseph Story	1798	Harvard University	
Oliver Ellsworth	1799	Yale College	
Daniel Webster	1801	Dartmouth College	
John Calhoun	1804	Yale College	
Levi Woodbury	1809	Dartmouth College	
Samuel Morse	1810	Yale College	
William H. Prescott	1814	Harvard University	
Joseph Tracy	1814	Dartmouth College	
William H. Seward	1819	Union College	
Rufus Choate	1819	Dartmouth College	
Nathaniel Hawthorne	1824	Bowdoin College	
Henry Wadsworth Longfellow	1825	Bowdoin College	
Salmon Portland Chase	1826	Dartmouth College	
William Strong	1828	Yale College	
Ralph Waldo Emerson	1828	Harvard University	
Benjamin Robbins Curtis	1829	Harvard University	
Lorenzo Langstroth	1831	Yale College	
Lyman Sanford	1831	Union College	
Asa Fowler	1833	Dartmouth College	
Timothy P. Redfield	1836	Dartmouth College	
Morrison Remick Waite	1837	Yale College	
Chester A. Arthur	1848	Union College	
William S. Clark	1848	Amherst College	
Timothy Dwight V	1848	Yale College	
Joshua Chamberlain	1852	Bowdoin College	
Joseph H. Choate	1852	Harvard University	
Melville Weston Fuller	1853	Bowdoin College	
George Shiras Jr	1853	Yale College	
David Josiah Brewer	1856	Yale College	
Henry Billings Brown	1856	Yale College	
James A. Garfield	1856	Williams College	
John B. Hinkson	1860	Lafayette College	
Oliver Wendell Holmes Jr.	1861	Harvard University	
George Moulton Carpenter	1864	Brown University	
William T. Sherman	1866	Dartmouth College	
Henry Adams	1872	Harvard University	
Henry James	1872	Harvard University	
Edward Bouchet	1874	Yale College	
William Henry Moody	1876	Harvard University	
John Hessin Clarke	1877	Case Western Reserve University	
Robert Peary	1877	Bowdoin College	
William Howard Taft	1878	Yale College	
Henry Clay Folger	1879	Amherst College	
John Dewey	1879	University of Vermont	
Theodore Roosevelt	1880	Harvard University	
Charles Evans Hughes	1881	Brown University	
Francis W. Shepardson	1883	Brown University	
George Santayana	1886	Harvard University	
Henry Stimson	1888	Yale University	
Bernard Baruch	1889	City College of New York	
Benjamin Cardozo	1889	Columbia College	
Bainbridge Colby	1890	Williams College	
Henrietta Swan Leavitt	1892	Radcliffe College	
Edward E. Wilson	1892	Williams College	
Learned Hand	1893	Harvard University	
Alexander Meiklejohn	1893	Brown University	
Andrew Sledd	1894	Randolph-Macon College	
Harlan Fiske Stone	1894	Amherst College	
Owen Roberts	1895	University of Pennsylvania	
John Barlow	1895	Brown University	
Louis Brandeis	1895	Harvard University	
Caroline Ransom Williams	1896	Mount Holyoke College	
John D. Rockefeller Jr.	1897	Brown University	
Richard B. Carter	1898	Harvard University	
Mary Annette Anderson	1899	Middlebury College	
John Gresham Machen	1901	Johns Hopkins University	
Felix Frankfurter	1902	City College of New York	
Elihu Root	1903	Hamilton College	
Stanley King	1903	Amherst College	
John J. Tigert	1904	Vanderbilt University	
Jessie Redmon Fauset	1905	Cornell University	
Christine Iverson Bennett	1907	University of Michigan	
Ernest Everett Just	1907	Dartmouth College	
John J. Parker	1907	University of North Carolina at Chapel Hill	
William Burke Belknap	1908	Yale University	
Edith Clarke	1908	Vassar College	
John Foster Dulles	1908	Princeton University	
John Hall Wheelock	1908	Harvard University	
Owen Brewster	1909	Bowdoin College	
Harold Hitz Burton	1909	Bowdoin College	
Walter Lippmann	1909	Harvard University	
Harold Medina	1909	Princeton University	
C.T. Wang	1910	Yale University	
Paul Douglas	1913	Bowdoin College	
Jane Barus	1913	Smith College	
Katharine Lambert Richards Rockwell	1913	Smith College	
Pearl Buck	1914	Randolph-Macon Woman's College	
James Bryant Conant	1914	Harvard University	
Carroll A. Edson	1914	Dartmouth College	
Hu Hsen-Hsu	1914	University of California, Berkeley	
Dean Acheson	1915	Yale University	
Archibald MacLeish	1915	Yale University	
Charles Hamilton Houston	1915	Amherst College	
Alfred Kinsey	1916	Bowdoin College	
Robert Frost	1916	Harvard University	
Irwin Edman	1917	Columbia University	
Jarvis Offutt	1917	Yale University	
Thomas Granville Pullen Jr.	1917	College of William & Mary	
Oliver Waterman Larkin	1918	Harvard University	
Paul Robeson	1919	Rutgers University	
K. K. Chen	1920	University of Wisconsin-Madison	
William O. Douglas	1920	Whitman College	
Percy Lavon Julian	1920	DePauw University	
David E. Lilienthal	1920	DePauw University	
Countee Cullen	1922	New York University	
Henry Friendly	1923	Harvard University	
Nathan F. Leopold	1923	University of Chicago	
Herbert Brownell Jr.	1924	University of Nebraska	
Grayson L. Kirk	1924	Miami University	
J. Robert Oppenheimer	1925	Harvard University	
Alger Hiss	1926	Johns Hopkins University	
Martin Dobelle	1926	Fordham University	
Amelia Frank	1927	Goucher College	
Joseph J. Spengler	1927	Ohio State University	
George H. Hitchings	1927	University of Washington	
Mildred Grosberg Bellin	1928	Smith College	
Eilene Galloway	1928	Swarthmore College	
Grace Hopper	1928	Vassar College	
John C. Stennis	1928	University of Virginia	
Carl Sandburg	1928	Harvard University	
Leroy Anderson	1929	Harvard University	
Harry Blackmun	1929	Harvard University	
Paul S. Dunkin	1929	DePauw University	
Margaret Burnham Geddes	1929	Vassar College	
James Michener	1929	Swarthmore College	
Lewis Franklin Powell Jr.	1929	Washington & Lee University	
William Fields Carter	1930	University of Richmond	
Nelson Rockefeller	1930	Dartmouth College	
Jonas Salk	1930	City College of New York	
Wylly Folk St. John	1930	University of Georgia	
Carl Albert	1931	University of Oklahoma	
Dean Rusk	1931	Davidson College	
Fred Sington	1931	University of Alabama	
Edward H. Levi	1932	University of Chicago	
Eugene O'Neill Jr.	1932	Yale University	
Eugene V. Rostow	1932	Yale University	
Barry Wood	1932	Harvard University	
Paul Weston (as Paul Wetstein)	1933	Dartmouth College	
Frank Oppenheimer	1933	Johns Hopkins University	
John Howard	1934	Case Western Reserve University	
Daniel Boorstin	1934	Harvard University	
Richard Helms	1935	Williams College	
T. S. Eliot	1935	Harvard University	
Samuel Belkin	1935	Brown University	
Milton Babbitt	1936	New York University	
Ed Muskie	1936	Bates College	
Robert McNamara	1936	University of California Berkeley	
Alan Lomax	1936	University of Texas	
Potter Stewart	1937	Yale University	
Byron White	1937	University of Colorado	
Caspar Weinberger	1938	Harvard University	
Doris Grumbach	1939	New York University	
John L. Loos	1939	University of Nebraska	
Nile Kinnick	1939	University of Iowa	
Wilma Dykeman	1940	Northwestern University	
Orville Freeman	1940	University of Minnesota	
Bernard Epstein	1940	New York University	
Ella T. Grasso	1940	Mount Holyoke College	
Allen Ludden	1940	University of Texas	
Robie Macauley	1941	Kenyon College	
Ruth Barcan Marcus	1941	New York University	
Wade H. McCree	1941	Fisk University	
William Kunstler	1941	Yale University	
John Paul Stevens	1941	University of Chicago	
Betty Friedan	1942	Smith College	
Carl W. Gottschalk	1942	Roanoke College	
Jade Snow Wong	1942	Mills College	
George C. Baldwin	1943	Kalamazoo College	
James F. Howard Jr.	1943	Yale University	
Phyllis Schlafly	1943	Washington University in St. Louis	
Cid Corman	1945	Tufts University	
Frank Church	1947	Stanford University	
Jack St. Clair Kilby	1947	University of Illinois	
Peter D. Lax	1947	New York University	
Tom Lehrer	1947	Harvard University	
Robert Bork	1948	University of Chicago	
George H. W. Bush	1948	Yale University	
Edward D. White Jr.	1948	Columbia University	
Martin Lewis Perl	1948	Polytechnic Institute of Brooklyn	
William Rehnquist	1948	Stanford University	
Judith Tobin	1948	Mount Holyoke College	
Brock Adams	1949	Washington University in St. Louis	
Bill Naito	1949	Reed College	
Edward O. Wilson	1949	University of Alabama	
Henry Kissinger	1950	Harvard University	
Marv Levy	1950	Coe College	
William Dickey	1951	Reed College	
Ursula K. Le Guin	1951	Radcliffe College	
Susan Sontag	1951	University of Chicago	
Arlen Specter	1951	University of Pennsylvania	
David Lee	1952	Harvard University	
Arthur Levitt	1952	Williams College	
Stephen Sondheim	1952	Williams College	
John Shelby Spong	1952	University of North Carolina	
Guido Calabresi	1953	Yale University	
Clive Davis	1953	New York University	
Ronald Dworkin	1953	Harvard University	
Fredric Jameson	1953	Haverford College	
Paul Donnelly Paganucci	1953	Dartmouth College	
Thomas R. Pickering	1953	Bowdoin College	
Ruth Bader Ginsburg	1954	Cornell University	
Jane Dempsey Douglass	1954	Syracuse University	
Sheldon Glashow	1954	Cornell University	
Richard Lugar	1954	Denison University	
Victor Navasky	1954	Swarthmore College	
Joan Rivers	1954	Barnard College	
John Updike	1954	Harvard University	
Steven Weinberg	1954	Cornell University	
Franklin M. Fisher	1955	Harvard University	
Ralph Nader	1955	Princeton University	
Reynolds Price	1955	Duke University	
John L. Hall	1956	Carnegie Mellon University	
Gloria Steinem	1956	Smith College	
Akira Iriye	1957	Haverford College	
Elizabeth Dole	1958	Duke University	
Anthony Kennedy	1958	Stanford University	
Kris Kristofferson	1958	Pomona College	
Joseph Nye	1958	Princeton University	
Paul Comi	1958	University of Southern California	
Robert Coleman Richardson	1958	Virginia Tech	
Stephen Breyer	1959	Stanford University	
Francis Ford Coppola	1959	Hofstra University	
John W. Dower	1959	Amherst College	
Bob Graham	1959	University of Florida	
Robert Nozick	1959	Columbia University	
Thomas Ruggles Pynchon Jr.	1959	Cornell University	
Richard Posner	1959	Yale University	
Richard Lindzen	1960	Harvard University	
Robert E. Rubin	1960	Harvard University	
David H. Souter	1960	Harvard University	
Daniel Gillespie	1960	Rice University	
Lester Thurow	1960	Williams College	
Fay Vincent	1960	Williams College	
Sheldon Goldman	1961	New York University	
Elizabeth Parr-Johnston	1961	Wellesley College	
Pat Schroeder	1961	University of Minnesota	
David Souter	1961	Harvard University	
Lamar Alexander	1962	Vanderbilt University	
Tom Brokaw	1962	University of South Dakota	
Lynne Cheney	1962	Colorado College	
Robert Christgau	1962	Dartmouth College	
Edward Ng	1962	University of Minnesota	
Barack Obama Sr.	1962	University of Hawaii	
Daniel C. Tsui	1962	Augustana College	
David L. Boren	1963	Yale University	
Richard Epstein	1963	Columbia University	
David Satcher	1963	Morehouse College	
John Edgar Wideman	1963	University of Pennsylvania	
James Woolsey	1963	Stanford University	
David Boies	1964	University of Redlands	
Michael Crichton	1964	Harvard University	
Leonard Bernstein	1964	Harvard University	
Joseph Lieberman	1964	Yale University	
Angela Davis	1965	Brandeis University	
Carl Gershman	1965	Yale University	
Terrence Malick	1965	Harvard University	
Walter Murch	1965	Johns Hopkins University	
W. Taylor Reveley III	1965	Princeton University	
Paul Wellstone	1965	University of North Carolina	
William Weld	1966	Harvard University	
Philip Lader	1966	Duke University	
George Smoot	1966	Massachusetts Institute of Technology	
Jane Harman	1966	Smith College	
John Postlethwait	1966	Purdue University	
Richard Blumenthal	1967	Harvard University	
Janet Yellen	1967	Brown University	
Maury Yeston	1967	Yale University	
Bill Clinton	1968	Georgetown University	
Michio Kaku	1968	Harvard University	
John C. Mather	1968	Swarthmore College	
Henry Paulson	1968	Dartmouth College	
Isaac Asimov	1972	Boston University	
Laurie Anderson	1969	Barnard College	
Jon Corzine	1969	University of Illinois	
Hugh David Politzer	1969	University of Michigan	
Frank J. Fabozzi	1969	City College of New York	
E. Annie Proulx	1969	University of Vermont	
Steven Chu	1970	University of Rochester	
Frank Easterbrook	1970	Swarthmore College	
Mazie Hirono	1970	University of Hawaiʻi at Mānoa	
Frank Wilczek	1970	University of Chicago	
David Rubenstein	1970	Duke University	
Louis Freeh	1971	Rutgers University	
Michael Katze	1971	Boston University	
Mike Nifong	1971	University of North Carolina	
Chuck Schumer	1971	Harvard University	
Pat Quinn	1971	Georgetown University	
Roger Tsien	1971	Harvard University	
Nadine Strossen	1972	Radcliffe College	
Samuel Alito	1972	Princeton University	
Robert B. Laughlin	1972	University of California Berkeley	
Jeffrey K. Tulis	1972	Bates College	
Benazir Bhutto	1973	Radcliffe College	
Jeb Bush	1973	University of Texas	
E.J. Dionne	1973	Harvard University	
Rita Dove	1973	Miami University	
John N. Kennedy	1973	Vanderbilt University	
Paul Alan Levy	1973	Reed College	
Austin Ligon	1973	University of Texas	
Renée Montagne	1973	University of California Berkeley	
Diana Nyad	1973	Lake Forest College	
Carl Wieman	1973	Massachusetts Institute of Technology	
Glenn Close	1974	College of William & Mary	
Christie Hefner	1974	Brandeis University	
Mark E. Kalmansohn	1974	University of California, Los Angeles	
Condoleezza Rice	1974	University of Denver	
Ben Bernanke	1975	Harvard University	
Susan Collins	1975	St. Lawrence University	
Griffith R. Harsh	1975	Harvard University	
Harold Hongju Koh	1975	Harvard University	
Gale Norton	1975	University of Denver	
Robert Zoellick	1975	Swarthmore College	
Michael Burns	1976	University of California, Los Angeles	
Lawrence B. Lindsey	1976	Bowdoin College	
Jack A. Goldstone	1976	Harvard University	
Alfredo Jocelyn-Holt	1976	Johns Hopkins University	
John G. Roberts	1976	Harvard University	
Sonia Sotomayor	1976	Princeton University	
Mark Warner	1977	George Washington University	
Michael Stuart	1977	DePauw University	
Jeffrey Vitter	1977	University of Notre Dame	
Dale Archer	1978	Tulane University	
Maurice Berger	1978	Hunter College	
Karen Hughes	1978	Southern Methodist University	
David Addington	1978	Georgetown University	
Paula Franzese	1979	Barnard College	
Debra Lehrmann	1979	University of Texas at Austin	
David Merritt	1979	University of Santa Clara	
Mary Lambeth Moore	1980	University of North Carolina at Chapel Hill	
Stavros Lambrinidis	1984	Amherst College	
Jennifer Granholm	1980	University of California, Berkeley	
Michael R. Barratt	1981	University of Washington	
Lynn Barry	1981	College of William & Mary	
Nicholas D. Kristof	1981	Harvard University	
Elena Kagan	1981	Princeton University	
I Michael Leitman	1981	Boston University	
Eliot Spitzer	1981	Princeton University	
Matthew Kramer	1981	Cornell University	
Jill Zimmerman	1981	Purdue University	
George Stephanopoulos	1982	Columbia University	
Kateryna Yushchenko	1982	Georgetown University	
Patrick Fitzgerald	1982	Amherst College	
David Duchovny	1982	Princeton University	
Jeffrey W. Legro	1982	Middlebury College	
Jean Rhodes	1983	University of Vermont	
Christopher Eisgruber	1983	Princeton University	
Miguel Estrada	1983	Columbia University	
Dinesh D'Souza	1983	Dartmouth College	
Christiane Amanpour	1983	University of Rhode Island	
Lisa Randall	1984	Harvard University	
Lee Siegel	1984	Columbia University	
Eric Allin Cornell	1985	Stanford University	
Ken Stern	1985	Haverford College	
Daniel Pearl	1985	Stanford University	
Carol Queen	1985	University of Oregon	
Robert C. Lieberman	1985	Yale University	
Anne Applebaum	1986	Yale University	
Jeff Bezos	1986	Princeton University	
Sabine Hyland	1986	Cornell University	
Susan Rice	1986	Stanford University	
Rafael Resendes	1987	University of California, Berkeley	
Laura J. Snyder	1987	Brandeis University	
Paul Clement	1988	Georgetown University	
Neil Gorsuch	1988	Princeton University	
KellyAnne Conway	1989	Trinity Washington University	
Eudora Welty	1989	Millsaps College	
Ashley Judd	1990	University of Kentucky	
Rosa Brooks	1990	Harvard University	
Joshua Redman	1991	Harvard University	
Paul Adelstein	1991	Bowdoin College	
Peter R. Orszag	1991	Princeton University	
Carson Kressley	1991	Gettysburg College	
Jimmy Carter	1991	Kansas State University	
Dena Grayson	1991	University of Florida	
Julie Story Byerley	1992	Rhodes College	
Eric Miller	1992	Duke University	
Doris Eaton Travis	1992	University of Oklahoma	
Danielle Allen	1993	Princeton University	
Benjamin Radford	1993	University of New Mexico	
Stephanie Herseth Sandlin	1993	Georgetown University	
Amit Mehta	1993	Georgetown University	
Bobby Jindal	1993	Brown University	
Teresa N. Washington	1993	Fisk University	
Matt Sherman	1994	University of North Carolina at Chapel Hill	
Amy Coney Barrett	1994	Rhodes College	
Robb LaKritz	1994	University of Michigan	
Burton Rocks	1994	Stony Brook University	
Mamphela Ramphele	1994	Harvard University	
James Kerwin	1995	Texas Christian University	
Griff Aldrich	1996	Hampden-Sydney College	
Matthew Kleban	1996	Reed College	
Andrew Mueller	1996	University of California, Santa Cruz	
Dan O'Brien	1996	Middlebury College	
Emily Bergl	1997	Grinnell College	
Richard Carrier	1997	University of California, Berkeley	
Susan Haack	1997	University of Miami	
Peyton Manning	1997	University of Tennessee	
Michael Schur	1997	Harvard University	
Ro Khanna	1998	University of Chicago	
Kerry Washington	1998	George Washington University	
Sufjan Stevens	1998	Hope College	
Brad Delson	1999	University of California, Los Angeles	
Rita Ng	2000	Stanford University	
Heidi Cruz	2000	Claremont McKenna College	
Holly A. Thomas	2000	Stanford University	
Brianna Keilar	2001	University of California, Berkeley	
Josh Hawley	2002	Stanford University	
Pete Buttigieg	2004	Harvard University	
Ben Shapiro	2004	University of California, Los Angeles	
Rivers Cuomo	2006	Harvard University	
Oludamini Ogunnaike	2007	Harvard University	
Vivek Ramaswamy	2007	Harvard University	
Isaiah Andrews	2009	Yale University	
Lena Park	2010	Columbia University	
Kurt Hugo Schneider	2010	Yale University	
Annie E. Clark	2011	University of North Carolina at Chapel Hill	
Tamar Kaprelian	2016	Columbia University	
Amanda Gorman	2020	Harvard University	

== Notable honorary members ==
Name	Date	Chapter of induction	Ref.
Rutherford B. Hayes	1880	Kenyon College	
Mark Twain	1902	University of Missouri	
Booker T. Washington	1904	Harvard University	
Calvin Coolidge	1921	Amherst College	
Franklin D. Roosevelt	1929	Harvard University	
Helen Keller	1933	Radcliffe College	
Harry S. Truman	1933	Honorary member	
Marcus Eli Ravage	1933	University of Missouri	
Eleanor Roosevelt	1942	Radcliffe College	
John Hope Franklin	1953	Fisk University	
W. E. B. Du Bois	1958	Fisk University	
R. Buckminster Fuller	1967	Harvard University	
Anne Sexton	1968	Harvard University	
Jimmy Carter	1991	Kansas State University	
Fred Rogers	1995	Carnegie Mellon University	
Mary Oliver	2003	Harvard University	
Sandra Day O'Connor	2008	College of William and Mary	
David Johnston	2013	Harvard University	
Barbara Bush	2016	University of Houston	
Rosalynn Carter	2016	Mercer University	
Ta-Nehisi Coates	2016	Oregon State University	
Willa Cather	2023	University of Nebraska	

== Fictional members ==
- Ellis Loew, fictional district attorney in James Ellroy's novels The Black Dahlia, The Big Nowhere, and L.A. Confidential, is a member. He shows his key several times.
- Thomas Crown, title character of the movie The Thomas Crown Affair, toys with his golden Phi Beta Kappa key which he is wearing on a chain. It is stated that he is an alumnus of Dartmouth College.
- Richard Sumner, the main character of the movie Desk Set (1957), is mentioned as a member when Bunny Watson (Katharine Hepburn) reels off Sumner's character's accomplishments and says that he's a graduate of M.I.T. with a Ph.D. in Science and a Phi Beta Kappa, although he doesn't wear his key.
- Harry Bailey in the movie It's a Wonderful Life (1946) is greeted at the train station by George and Uncle Billy as "Professor Phi Beta Kappa Harry Bailey," implying he is a member.
- Charley Bordelon West in TV show Queen Sugar is a member. This is referenced when she has to correct someone who incorrectly refers to it as a social fraternity.
- Emily Sweeney in TV show The Big Bang Theory is revealed as a Phi Beta Kappa member. It is said to have been apparent on her online dating profile viewed by Rajesh Koothrappali. Also, Sheldon Cooper has a frame of Phi Beta Kappa in his office, suggesting that he is a member.
- Gavin Stevens, the protagonist of several pieces by William Faulkner, exhibits the Phi Beta Kappa key from Harvard in the stories "Hand Upon the Water", "An Error in Chemistry" and "Knight's Gambit".
- Niles Crane of the TV show Frasier is a member.
- Greg Sanders of the TV show CSI: Crime Scene Investigation is a member.
