= List of news programs formerly distributed by American Public Television =

The following is a list of news programs formerly distributed to public television stations (including PBS affiliates) through American Public Television. There is a separate list for current, upcoming and unreleased programming.

== News series ==
Legend
| ^{APT WORLDWIDE} | Also on APT Worldwide |
| ^{CREATE} | Also on Create |
| ^{HDTV} | High-definition television |
| ^{ITVS} | Funded and distributed by Independent Television Service |
| ^{LPB} | Funded and distributed by Latino Public Broadcasting |
| ^{NHK} | Funded and distributed by NHK (Japan Broadcasting Corporation) |
| ^{VMM} | Funded and distributed by Vision Maker Media (formerly Native American Public Broadcasting Consortium and Native American Public Telecommunications) |
| ^{WORLD} | Also on WORLD |

=== News & public affairs ===
==== 1970s ====
| Title | Premiere date | End date | Note(s) | Legend(s) | Source(s) |
|---|---|---|---|---|---|
| Martin Agronsky's Evening Edition | August 2, 1971 | July 4, 1975 | (Note: Distributed by PBS from 1975 to 1976.) | | |
| The Captioned ABC News | December 3, 1973 | June 28, 1974 | (Note: Distributed by PBS from 1974 to 1982.) | | |

==== 1980s ====
| Title | Premiere date | End date | Note(s) | Legend(s) | Source(s) |
|---|---|---|---|---|---|
| Nightly Business Report | October 19, 1981 | March 21, 2005 | (Note: Distributed by PBS from 2005 to 2011.) | ^{APT WORLDWIDE}^{WORLD} | |
| Nightly Business Report | December 5, 2011 | December 27, 2019 | (Note: Distributed by PBS from 2005 to 2011.) | ^{APT WORLDWIDE}^{WORLD} | |
| John McLaughlin's One on One | September 1, 1985 | May 30, 2013 | | | |
| Inside Washington | July 2, 1987 | April 14, 2014 | | | |

==== 1990s ====
| Title | Premiere date | End date | Note(s) | Legend(s) | Source(s) |
|---|---|---|---|---|---|
| The 11th Hour | November 15, 1992 | November 14, 2001 | (Note: 1992 version.) | | |
| Morning Business Report | January 3, 1994 | December 31, 2002 | | | |
| Uncommon Knowledge | May 18, 1996 | March 2, 2006 | (Note: Seasons 1-3 and 9 only.) | | |
| Malone | February 7, 1998 | February 6, 2001 | | | |
| Dialogues with Elie Wiesel & Richard D. Heffner | July 3, 1998 | July 2, 2001 | | | |
| ITN World News for Public Television | November 2, 1998 | December 31, 2001 | | | |

==== 2000s ====
| Title | Premiere date | End date | Note(s) | Legend(s) | Source(s) |
|---|---|---|---|---|---|
| Closer to Truth | April 2, 2000 | April 1, 2005 | (Note: Now distributed by Executive Program Services.) | | |
| The Power of Ideas | September 3, 2000 | September 2, 2006 | | | |
| The 11th Hour | September 2, 2001 | September 6, 2011 | (Note: 2001 version.) | | |
| For the Record | September 2, 2001 | October 4, 2011 | | | |
| Focus Asia | April 1, 2002 | April 17, 2008 | | | |
| Ethically Speaking | October 5, 2003 | October 4, 2011 | | | |
| The Latin View | January 4, 2004 | May 2, 2018 | (Note: Season 2-6 only.) | | |
| Inside Saddam's Iraq | June 30, 2004 | June 29, 2006 | | | |
| Presidential Conversations on the Constitution | October 1, 2004 | September 30, 2010 | | | |
| Sesno Reports | October 1, 2004 | December 11, 2005 | | | |
| Eye on Washington | November 5, 2004 | August 24, 2007 | | | |
| World Business | March 4, 2005 | September 26, 2011 | (Note: Seasons 5-11 only.) | | |
| Foreign Exchange | April 1, 2005 | November 5, 2009 | (Note: aka Foreign Exchange with Fareed Zakaria in seasons 1-3.) | | |
| The Kalb Report | November 2, 2007 | November 8, 2023 | | | |
| Worldfocus | October 6, 2008 | April 2, 2010 | (Note: Planned to end October 2, 2010.) | | |

==== 2010s ====
| Title | Premiere date | End date | Note(s) | Legend(s) | Source(s) |
|---|---|---|---|---|---|
| The Future of News | January 1, 2010 | December 31, 2011 | | | |
| Two-Way Street | January 1, 2010 | December 31, 2010 | | | |
| BBC World News America | March 28, 2011 | May 31, 2019 | (Note: Moved to PBS after an agreement with PBS member station WETA 26/Washington, D.C..) | | |
| Asia 7 Days | April 1, 2011 | March 31, 2013 | | ^{NHK} | |
| Tomorrow: Japan Beyond 3/11 | April 11, 2011 | April 6, 2016 | (Note: aka NHK World Specials in season 1.) | ^{NHK} | |
| Moyers & Company | January 13, 2012 | January 8, 2015 | | | |
| NHK World Specials | August 9, 2015 | September 15, 2015 | | ^{NHK} | |
| The Whole Truth with David Eisenhower | April 1, 2016 | May 2, 2026 | | | |
| The Interview Show with Mark Bazer | April 6, 2018 | July 31, 2020 | | | |

==== 2020s ====
| Title | Premiere date | End date | Note(s) | Legend(s) | Source(s) |
|---|---|---|---|---|---|
| The McLaughlin Group | January 3, 2020 | December 25, 2020 | (Note: Season 39 was planned to premiere, but it was cancelled for unknown reasons.) | | |
| The Laura Flanders Show | November 13, 2020 | March 31, 2024 | | ^{WORLD} | |
| Zeroing In: Carbon Neutral 2050 | November 1, 2021 | June 30, 2023 | | ^{NHK} | |
| BBC News | November 1, 2023 | December 31, 2024 | | ^{WORLD} | |
| BBC News America | November 1, 2023 | December 31, 2024 | | ^{WORLD} | |
| BBC News The Context | November 1, 2023 | December 31, 2024 | | ^{WORLD} | |

=== Business & finance ===
==== 1990s ====
| Title | Premiere date | End date | Note(s) | Legend(s) | Source(s) |
|---|---|---|---|---|---|
| Right on the Money | January 22, 1999 | January 16, 2006 | | | |

==== 2000s ====
| Title | Premiere date | End date | Note(s) | Legend(s) | Source(s) |
|---|---|---|---|---|---|
| Better Investing | January 6, 2002 | January 5, 2005 | | | |
| Betting It All: The Entrepreneurs | July 4, 2004 | July 3, 2008 | (Note: Season 2 only.) | | |
| MoneyTrack | April 24, 2005 | September 3, 2017 | | | |

==== 2010s ====
| Title | Premiere date | End date | Note(s) | Legend(s) | Source(s) |
|---|---|---|---|---|---|
| Consuelo Mack WealthTrack | January 1, 2010 | July 3, 2026 | (Note: Distributed by PBS from 2005 to 2009.) | ^{WORLD} | |
| The Truth About Money with Ric Edelman | April 22, 2011 | September 2, 2016 | | | |
| The Ideas Exchange | October 2, 2013 | October 1, 2015 | | | |

=== Sports ===
==== 1990s ====
| Title | Premiere date | End date | Note(s) | Legend(s) | Source(s) |
|---|---|---|---|---|---|
| Fly Tying: The Angler's Art | January 1, 1997 | January 1, 2002 | (Note: Season 1-2 and 4-5 only.; How-to genre in season 1-2.; Lifestyle genre from 2009 to 2012 in season 5.) | | |
| Fly Tying: The Angler's Art | April 2, 2005 | April 3, 2018 | (Note: Season 1-2 and 4-5 only.; How-to genre in season 1-2.; Lifestyle genre from 2009 to 2012 in season 5.) | | |

==== 2000s ====
| Title | Premiere date | End date | Note(s) | Legend(s) | Source(s) |
|---|---|---|---|---|---|
| Adventure Golf | May 1, 2005 | May 5, 2008 | | | |
| Volvo Ocean Race 2008-2009 | October 24, 2008 | July 23, 2009 | | | |

==== 2010s ====
| Title | Premiere date | End date | Note(s) | Legend(s) | Source(s) |
|---|---|---|---|---|---|
| The New Fly Fisher | April 2, 2011 | April 8, 2020 | (Note: Season 6-8 only.) | | |

== News specials ==
=== News & public affairs ===
==== 1990s ====
| Title | Premiere date | End date | Note(s) | Legend(s) | Sources(s) |
|---|---|---|---|---|---|
| Tonight's Top Story | November 8, 1998 | November 7, 2004 | | | |
| Learn & Live | January 15, 1999 | May 19, 2005 | (Note: Planned to end on January 14, 2008.) | | |
| It's Elementary: Talking About Gay Issues in School | June 1, 1999 | May 31, 2001 | | | |

==== 2000s ====
| Title | Premiere date | End date | Note(s) | Legend(s) | Sources(s) |
|---|---|---|---|---|---|
| A Public Voice 2002: Racial and Ethnic Tensions | June 9, 2002 | June 8, 2003 | | | |
| A Public Voice 2003: Terrorism | June 8, 2003 | June 7, 2005 | | | |
| A Public Voice 2004: Healthcare | June 6, 2004 | June 5, 2005 | | | |
| For the Record 10th Season Celebration! | September 5, 2004 | September 4, 2008 | | | |
| A Public Voice 2005: Immigration | June 3, 2005 | June 2, 2006 | | | |
| A Public Voice 2006: People and Politics | June 16, 2006 | June 15, 2007 | | | |
| A Public Voice 2007: Energy | June 15, 2007 | June 14, 2009 | | | |
| Fueling Our Future: A Fred Friendly Seminar | October 12, 2008 | October 11, 2016 | | | |

=== Business & finance ===
==== 2000s ====
| Title | Premiere date | End date | Note(s) | Legend(s) | Source(s) |
|---|---|---|---|---|---|
| Right on the Money: Special with Louie Anderson | June 18, 2000 | June 17, 2003 | | | |
| The Buck Stops Here: Jonathan Pond Answers Your Money Questions | August 3, 2001 | August 2, 2003 | | | |
| Women Count: Smart About Money | October 14, 2001 | October 13, 2013 | | | |
| What's Your Net Worth? with Jennifer Openshaw | January 20, 2002 | January 19, 2006 | | | |
| Ken Stern's Life Plan for Wealth | February 16, 2003 | February 15, 2006 | | | |
| You Don't Have to Be Rich...Jean Chatzky on Money and Happiness | November 29, 2003 | December 31, 2005 | | | |
| The ABCs of Personal Finance...with Julie Stav | November 29, 2003 | November 28, 2005 | | | |
| Tu Dinero Con Juile Stav | November 29, 2003 | November 28, 2005 | | | |
| Tom Peters: Re-Imagine Business Excellence in a Disruptive Age | May 1, 2004 | April 30, 2012 | | | |
| Who's Afraid to Be a Millionaire? | July 30, 2006 | July 29, 2010 | | | |
| Return on Customer | February 23, 2007 | February 22, 2010 | | | |
| What's Up in Finance? | April 1, 2007 | March 31, 2011 | | | |
| Pounce for Alpha Wealth with Ken Stern | February 23, 2009 | March 22, 2012 | | | |
| Business Ethics in the 21st Century | April 5, 2009 | April 4, 2012 | | | |

==== 2010s ====
| Title | Premiere date | End date | Note(s) | Legend(s) | Source(s) |
|---|---|---|---|---|---|
| Steph Olsen: The Power of Money | March 1, 2010 | February 29, 2012 | | | |
| Tricks of the Trade: Outsmarting Investment Fraud | September 5, 2010 | September 4, 2013 | | | |
| Doing Virtuous Business | May 22, 2011 | May 21, 2017 | | | |
| MoneyTrack: Money for Life | November 20, 2016 | November 25, 2025 | | | |

=== Sports ===
==== 1990s ====
| Title | Premiere date | End date | Note(s) | Legend(s) | Source(s) |
|---|---|---|---|---|---|
| A Celebration of Horses: The American Saddlebred | November 1, 1993 | October 31, 1995 | (Note: Failed pilot.) | | |
| Kings of the Hill | June 30, 1997 | June 29, 1999 | | | |
| Sports on the Silver Screen | May 1, 1998 | September 30, 1999 | | | |
| Sports Heroines | August 14, 1998 | August 13, 2001 | | | |
| Second to None: The Larry Doby Story | September 1, 1998 | August 31, 2004 | (Note: Originally biography genre.) | | |

==== 2000s ====
| Title | Premiere date | End date | Note(s) | Legend(s) | Source(s) |
|---|---|---|---|---|---|
| Dem Bums: The Brooklyn Dodgers | March 1, 2001 | July 31, 2003 | | | |
| World Ten Dance Championship 2001 | January 1, 2003 | January 31, 2005 | | | |
| Bud Greenspan's Kings of the Ring: Four Legends of Heavyweight Boxing | February 1, 2003 | December 31, 2003 | | | |
| First Woman of Hockey: Manon Rhéaume | February 1, 2003 | January 31, 2005 | | | |
| The Educated Trout | March 1, 2003 | February 28, 2005 | | | |
| The Life and Times of Hank Greenberg | August 1, 2003 | August 31, 2005 | | | |
| Jackie Robinson: A Life Story | February 1, 2004 | January 31, 2006 | | | |

== See also ==
- List of programs formerly distributed by American Public Television
- List of PBS member stations
- List of programs broadcast by PBS
- List of programs broadcast by PBS Kids
- List of programs broadcast by Create
- List of worldwide programs distributed by American Public Television
