= Openshaw (disambiguation) =

Openshaw is a ward in the City of Manchester, United Kingdom.

Openshaw may also refer to:

- Manchester Openshaw (UK Parliament constituency)

== People with the surname ==
- Jennifer Openshaw, American radio personality
- Olive F. Openshaw, English illustrator; see Mary Mouse
- Peter Openshaw (judge) (born 1947), English judge
- Peter Openshaw (immunologist) (born 1954), English immunologist
- Reginald Openshaw Lawson (1880–?), English footballer
- Thomas Horrocks Openshaw (1856–1929), English surgeon
- Violet Oppenshaw (1888–1975), British singer
- William Openshaw (1851–1915), English rugby union international
