= Peter Openshaw =

Peter Openshaw may refer to:

- Peter Openshaw (judge) (born 1947), English judge
- Peter Openshaw (immunologist) (born 1954), English immunologist

== See also ==
- Openshaw (disambiguation)
