= Ousmane Oumar Kane =

Senegalese Muslim scholar of Islamic studies

Ousmane Oumar Kane is a Senegalese Muslim scholar of Islamic studies. He holds the Prince Alwaleed Bin Talal Chair on Contemporary Islamic Religion and Society at the Harvard Divinity School and the Department of Near Eastern Languages and Civilization at Harvard University since July 2012.

== Biography ==
Kane received a Bachelor of Arts in Arabic and a Masters in Islamic Studies from the Institut national des langues et civilisations orientales at the University of the Sorbonne Nouvelle, and an M. Phil and a Ph.D in Political Science and Middle Eastern Studies from the Institut d'Etudes Politiques de Paris. He held the position of assistant professor of political science at Université Gaston Berger de Saint-Louis in Senegal, and visiting positions at the University of London, the University of Kansas, Yale University, and the Institute for Advanced Study Berlin. He became associate professor of International and Public Affairs at Columbia University in 2002, and left for Harvard in 2012. Kane is the maternal grandson of Senegalese Islamic scholar, Ibrahim Niass.

== Publications ==
- Islamic Scholarship in Africa. New Directions and Global Contexts (London: James Currey, 2021)
- Les Sénégalais d'Amérique (Dakar: CERDIS, 2019)
- Beyond Timbuktu: An Intellectual History of Muslim West Africa, Harvard University Press, 2016).
- The Homeland is the Arena: Religion, Transnationalism and the Integration of Senegalese Migrants in America, New York: Oxford University Press, 2011. ISBN 9780199732302.
- Muslim Modernity in Postcolonial Nigeria. A Study of the Society of the Removal of Innovation and Reinstatement of Tradition, Leiden and Boston: E.J. Brill, 2003 ISBN 9789004125889
- Intellectuels non Europhones. Dakar : Codesria, 2003
  - Translated into English as Non-Europhone intellectuals, and also into, Spanish and Arabic)
- Al-Makhtutat al-islamiyya fi Sinighal, (Handlist of Islamic Manuscripts in Sénégal), London, Al-Furqan, 1997.Also published in Arabic as ابراهيم نياس في السنغال / Fihris makhṭūṭāt Maktabat al-Shaykh Mūr Mubay Sīsī wa-maktabat al-Ḥājj Mālik Sih wa-Maktabat al-Shaykh Ibrāhīm Niyās fī al-Sinighāl
- Islam et islamisme au Sud du Sahara, Paris, Karthala, 1998, (with Jean-Louis Triaud).

He has also written a number of peer-reviewed journal articles.

== See also ==
- Oludamini Ogunnaike
