= Bartiromo =

Bartiromo is a surname. Notable people with the surname include:

- Cole Bartiromo (born 1985), American blogger and convicted felon
- Maria Bartiromo (born 1967), American financial journalist, television personality, news anchor, and author
