= James Cantine =

American missionary, scholar, and traveler

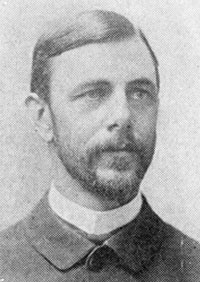
- Cantine in 1910
- Born: March 3, 1861
- Died: July 1, 1940 (aged 79); Benedictine Hospital, Kingston, New York
- Occupation: Missionary
- Years active: 1889–1940
- Known for: Co-founding the Arabian Mission, Reformed Church in America
- Spouse: Elizabeth DePree Cantine

Reverend James Cantine (March 3, 1861 – July 1, 1940) was an American missionary, scholar, and traveler. While studying at New Brunswick Theological Seminary in New Jersey, he co-founded the Arabian Mission with John Lansing and Samuel Marinus Zwemer. The mission exists today as the American Mission Hospital of Bahrain. He was a missionary for forty years, which included establishing the first mission for the Reformed Church in Arabia, which was also the first mission in eastern Arabia. Between 1891 and 1929, he established mission posts, medical clinics, and churches in Arabia.

His wife, Elizabeth, was a nurse and the first single woman to become a missionary in Arabia. Together they founded a women's clinic in Muscat, Oman, worked at missionary posts, and when the United Missions was formed, they were both representatives of the Reformed Church in America for the organization. Cantine co-authored the book, The Golden Milestone: Reminiscences of Pioneer Days Fifty Years in Arabia with Zwemer.

== Early life and education ==
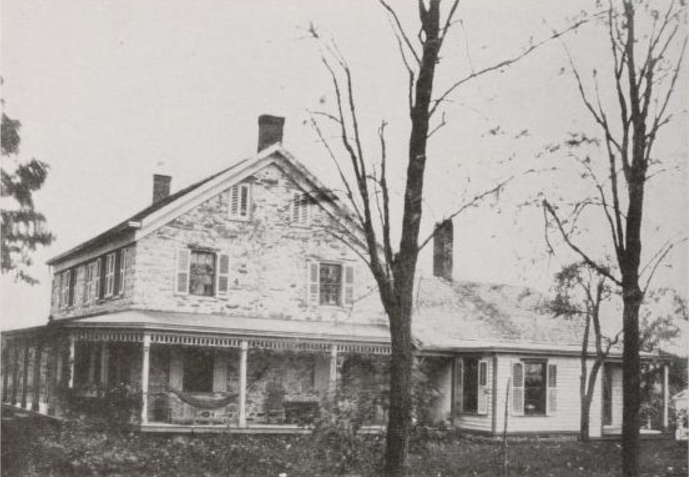
Cantine Homestead, Stone Ridge, New York. It was childhood home of Dr. James Cantine, missionary and co-founder of the Arabian Mission of the Reformed Church in America.

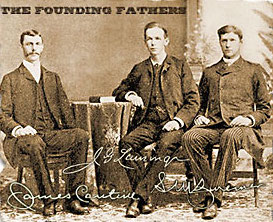
James Cantine, J.G. Lansing, and Samuel Marinus Zwemer, Founding Fathers of the Arabian Mission for the Reformed Church in America

He was born on the family homestead in Stone Ridge, New York on March 3, 1861 to James and Charlotte Hasbrouck Cantine. (Note: "Taking a motherly interest in the boy, Mrs Cantine said to her husband, 'Take a cup of coffee out to him to make his lunch more palatable.' Mr. Cantine remarked to his wife, 'Charlotte, that's a very promising young man and I prophesy he will go a long way in the world.' And so he did, for he was none other than Jay Gould. Mrs. William F. Hasbrouck, 1933, quoted on Stone Ridge Public Library) He had a sister, Catherine. His mother died on the family homestead in Stone Ridge on November 24, 1916 at 99 years of age, after having been a widow for many years.

Cantine graduated with a Civil Engineering Degree from Union College in 1883. After graduating, Cantine worked for three years as an engineer at Westinghouse Air Brake Company in Schenectady, but decided to become a missionary.

He studied at New Brunswick Theological Seminary in New Brunswick, New Jersey, where he met Dr. Lansing and, with Samuel Zwemer, was inspired to perform missionary work in Arabia. (Note: It was Lansing's dream to establish a mission in Arabia, but his poor health prevented him from doing the work there. Instead, he rallied support for the organization from the United States.) He was ordained on October 1, 1889 by his classis in the Fair Street Reformed Church, Kingston, New York. He received his Doctor of Divinity (D.D.) in 1903 from Union College.

== Career ==
=== Arabian Mission established ===
Lansing, Cantine, and Samuel Zwemer established the Arabian Mission on August 1, 1889, at the Cantine homestead in Stone Ridge. About two and a half months later, on October 16, Cantine boarded a ship for Beirut; Zwemer would join him after he completed his last year at the seminary. He studied Islam and the Arabic language in Beirut and Syria, where he met and was influenced by Henry Harris Jessup, an American Presbyterian missionary and the main editor of the Protestant translation of the Arabic Bible. (Note: It was while in Syria studying Arabic that Cantine met Kamil Aietany, a convert to Christianity from a devout Muslim family. Kamil, as he is commonly known, left his family home after he declared himself to be a Christian. He later became a preacher for the Arabian Mission, preaching in Basrah, Aden, and other areas. He died two years later after having been "apparently poisoned".) Both Cantine and Zwemer visited a number of cities in the Arabia region to determine the best place for them to establish a mission.

=== Basrah and other initial outposts ===
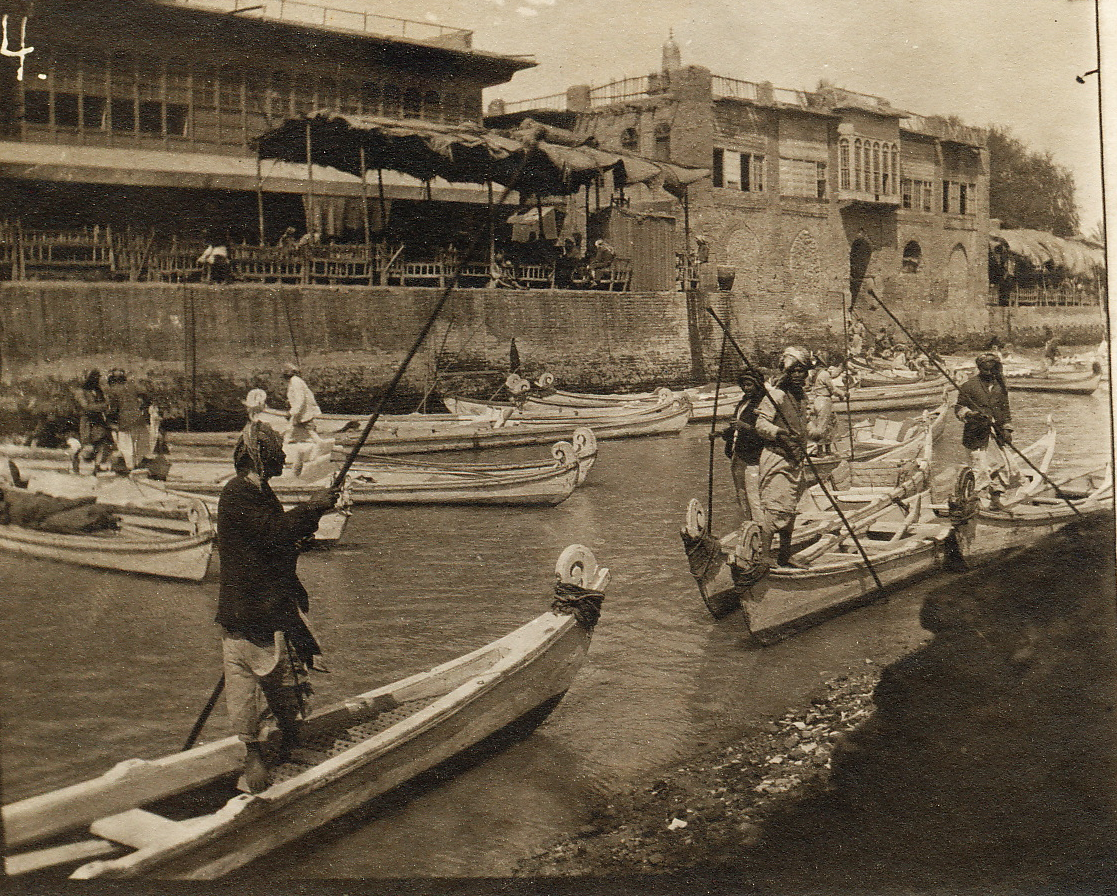
Canals in Barah with balam, 1913

Cantine established a mission at Basrah, and Zwemer joined him in early 1892. Basrah was chosen because of its location along the eastern coast that enabled easy access to the whole of Northern Arabia. Located on the Persian Gulf, it was the first mission on Arabia's eastern coast, and it was the first mission for the Reform Church in Arabia.

Their approach was one of direct evangelism, by converting Arabs to Christianity. Prior to that, missionaries used an indirect approach, where they sought to revitalize the faith among people who were already Christians. Direct evangelism by foreigners had been forbidden by the Ottoman government. Cantine was primarily interested in spreading Christianity, and so he created relationships with other Christian missions in the area, but he also wanted their Arabian Mission to survive and at times bowed to political pressures to do so. Zwemer was a gifted linguist, writer, and orator and became the voice of the Arabian Mission. "He had an irrepressible and aggressive personality, earnest where Cantine was tender, driving where his colleague was contemplative."

Their plans to establish a needed medical mission were delayed due to staffing issues and funding, but they carried on with their Bible work, taking over efforts of the British and Foreign Bible Society. In 1893, outposts were established in Bahrain and Muscat, by Zwemer and his brother, Peter, respectively. Since its beginning, missionaries and physicians came to support the work of the Arabian Mission and staff its posts. They sold about 200 booklets with Scripture within a couple of years. In 1894, the management of the independent mission was transferred to the Foreign Board of the church.

The missionaries hired Dr. Worrall in 1895, but he was severely ill much of his first summer. Cantine returned to the United States for part of the year and raised interest and funds for the mission. In the meantime, there were wars between local tribes, with looting at Muscat. The Bible shop was closed by the government. (Note: In Basrah, Zwemer's brother sought shelter at the British Consulate, due to wars between local tribes, the Muscat mission having been looted, and Muscat taken over by bedouins. The Turkish government arrested people that were selling Bibles and closed down the Bible book store in Basrah.) Another station was opened up at Amara, and Dr. Worrall was well enough to see patients in Basrah and Nasariah, creating a means to build relationships with the local people. They were also selling more Scriptures, about 80% of them to Moslems.

Zwemer settled in 1895 or 1896 in Bahrain, which had been judged to have very poor living conditions, like malaria, cholera, dysentery, and smallpox due to significant humidity and high temperatures. In his search for information about living conditions, Cantine found that it was considered "the most unhealthy place in all the area."

=== Other areas ===
He was a man with a soft sense of humor. He perceived the tender parts of the human spirit and had a deep capacity for loving people. He had a knack for understanding how relationships worked between diverse personalities. Be he remained to the end a kind of missiological engineer. He did not have a great flair for lateral thinking. That he left to his colleague, Zwemer…

— Eulogy at his funeral, July, 1940

In 1898, Cantine urgently left Basrah for Muscat because Samuel Zwemer and another colleague fell sick. Later, Muscat came to be known as "Cantine's station". In 1901, Cantine helped build a two-story building, the Mason Memorial Hospital after extensive negotiations with the ruler of Bahrain.

Elizabeth DePree, a nurse from Grand Rapids, Michigan, came to Arabia and was the first single woman to work as a missionary in Arabia. (Note: DePree was born in Pella, Iowa. She was a registered nurse who trained and in 1898 completed her training at the Butterworth Training School for Nurses, which was located in Grand Rapids, Michigan.) She was recruited by the mission and first studied and worked in Bahrain before coming to the mission in Oman. Cantine married DePree in 1904, and they continued their work together. They stayed in Muscat, Oman, where Elizabeth made house calls, worked at a daily clinic, and taught at a sewing school for girls. She became known as the "mother of modern medicine in Oman".

He returned to the United States, and with Zwemer, spoke about the Arabian Mission at the West End Collegiate Church on November 1, 1908, and two weeks later at the Lenox Avenue Collegiate Reformed Church, both in New York City.

Cantine and his wife opened a women's clinic in Muscat, which was staffed by Dr. Sarah Hosman. In 1921, the Cantines were transferred to Baghdad to the Reform Church Missionary Society to help rebuild following World War I.

=== Later years ===
In 1924, the outposts and stations that they had established were merged with other missions in Mesopotamia and Arabia to form the United Missions in Mesopotania, and both of the Cantines were representatives of the Reform Church of America for the organization. Zwemer raised funds and Cantine implemented the plans to build the Union Church and Religious Center in Baghdad by mid-1926.

Elizabeth's health declined and they returned to the United States in April 1926. She died in Stone Ridge on August 30, 1927. He continued his missionary work in Arabia for a further of two years after her death, when he was no longer in good health. He returned to the homestead in Stone Ridge and continued promoting the work of the Arabian mission by speaking out to various sections of the Reformed Church.

Cantine was co-author of The Golden Milestone: Reminiscences of Pioneer Days Fifty Years in Arabia with Zwemer, which he spoke about in the United States. Cantine was honored for his 50 years of missionary work on the October 27, 1938 by the Reformed Church at Fair Street, where he was first ordained.

== Death ==
He had a heart attack in 1938 during a vacation in Florida, and a severe heart attack about May 1940, when he was taken to Benedictine Hospital in Kingston, New York. He remained there until his death on July 1, 1940. He was buried with his wife at the Fairview Cemetery in Stone Ridge, New York about July 5, 1940.

Long years of association with the Arab served also to bring Dr. Cantine something of that spirit of submission which is a keynote of Islam, that overwhelming sense of the omnipotence and omniscience of God, thus with him it was graced by an abounding faith in the love of God. Therein is found the secret of his imperturbable calm, his unwavering faith, which enabled him to face disappointment, suffering, and apparent failure with that sweet, philosophical smile of utter confidence in the fundamental rightness of things, which none who knew him can ever forget.

—F.M. Potter, Memorial Brochure

== See also ==
- Mary Bruins Allison, physician at the Arabian Mission
- Christine Iverson Bennett, physician at the Arabian Mission
