= Katze =

Katze is a surname. Notable persons with the surname include:

== People ==
- Michael Katze, American microbiologist

== Fictional characters ==
- Berg Katze, an alien from the 2013 anime TV series Gatchaman Crowds
