= Pam Krueger =

American TV producer

Pam Krueger is a creator, co-host, and executive producer of MoneyTrack, a half-hour TV series about personal finance and investing that had aired on 255 Public Broadcasting Service public television stations nationwide. Krueger grew up in Cape Cod and currently lives in both Osterville, Massachusetts, and Tiburon, California.

== Early career ==
Krueger began her career as a stock broker. In 2000, she produced and anchored segments on Bay Area television networks including ABC-TV's Marketplace, TechTV's The Money Machine, and the PBS series Money Moves. Krueger also produced IPO: Investing Pays Off, a children's financial series that earned a CINE award and an Emmy nomination in 2004.

=== MoneyTrack ===
In 2005, Krueger launched MoneyTrack. Krueger wrote the foreword Getting on the MoneyTrack in October 2005 with Rob Black. Her first book, The MoneyTrack Method: The Real Person's Guide to Successful Investing, was released in October 2008.

== Other projects ==
In 2014, Krueger developed Wealthramp.com to match consumers to fiduciary financial advisors.

Krueger is the official spokesperson for the California Jump$tart Coalition, an organization that helps to increase financial literacy among children and teens. She is also a national spokesperson for the Institute for the Fiduciary Standard. In 2016, Krueger contributed the consumer's point of view to The Essential Advisor, a book by Envestnet president Bill Crager.

== Awards ==
Krueger won the 2009 and 2010 Gracie Awards for Individual Achievement for Outstanding Producer of an Entertainment Series on Public Television.

The MoneyTrack series was awarded two Telly Awards, a Clarion Award, and two Communicator Awards for Season Two.
