= Lucian Kozminski =

Lucian Ludwig Kozminski
- Born: July 5, 1916 modern-day Poland
- Died: January 19, 1993 (aged 76) (reported); Los Angeles, California, U.S.
- Status: Convicted and sentenced
- Criminal charges: Mail and bankruptcy fraud

Lucian Ludwig Kozminski (July 5, 1916 – possibly January 19, 1993) was a Polish-born American who was convicted in 1982 of swindling some 3,000 of his fellow Holocaust survivors. He was a survivor at Auschwitz concentration camp and a Jewish Oberkapo, an SS-appointed enforcer within the German death and Nazi concentration camps during World War II.

Kozminski was prosecuted by Mark E. Kalmansohn, a Jewish-American of Lithuanian lineage, who served as a federal prosecutor from 1977 to 1983. Years after Kozminski's initial federal convictions, and still vowing rightful justice for the Holocaust survivors twice-victimized by Kozminski, Kalmansohn independently undertook a lengthy investigation and two (pro bono) civil actions to make Kozminski pay for his crimes against humanity. The majority of Kozminski's victims were elderly and many were nearly impoverished.

Kozminski appears to have died in 1993, however, his death certificate has since been ruled by a court as fraudulent and authorities believe he may have faked his death to avoid paying his settlement from Kalmansohn's civil suit.

== Biography ==
=== Early life ===
Kozminski allegedly immigrated to the United States after World War II on an illegal visa.

=== Crime ===
According to court records from his 1982 trial, Kozminski posed as a restitution counselor who charged exorbitant up-front and service fees, then pocketed German government restitution checks intended for Holocaust survivors. Kalmansohn estimated that Kozminski bilked his victims out of an estimated $1 million, which, with inflation and interest, would have been worth well over $10 million by 2002.

=== Indictments ===
Holocaust survivors Jacob Weingarten and Modka "Max" Wolman took their complaints to federal authorities, who, in turn, assigned the criminal case to Kalmansohn in 1981. After an exhaustive investigation spanning multiple continents, Kalmansohn and then U.S. Postal Inspector Lothar Fritz "Lou" Kinzler obtained grand jury indictments against Kozminski. Pleading guilty to eight counts of mail and bankruptcy fraud, Kozminski was sentenced to twelve years in federal prison.

=== Kozminski's release and supposed death ===
Bureau of Prisons records show that Kozminski was released from prison in late 1989, even though he was allegedly spotted walking a street in Beverly Hills, California, in 1987. Kozminski was also reportedly seen numerous times following his supposed death on January 9, 1993, after being admitted to a hospital for pneumonia.

Amid mounting evidence which led to the belief that Kozminski could have faked his death to avoid paying Holocaust survivors, Kalmansohn filed civil suits against Kozminski on behalf of Weingarten and Wolman.

In 1999, Los Angeles County Superior Court Judge John W. Ouderkirk ruled that Kozminski's death certificate was false and/or fraudulent and that Kozminski may still be alive. In 2000, a second judge concurred in the earlier finding.

== Alleged Nazi collaboration ==
Kalmanson alleged that Kozminski received special privileges at the Gross-Rosen concentration camp by collaborating with Nazis. Kozminski was also quoted as once saying, "The Nazis were right about the Jews, and that Jewish survivors were 'old and senile' and did not need any restitution money."

Kalmansohn, who called Kozminski a person of 'utter greed, ruthlessness and moral depravity,' claimed the information came from concentration camp survivors who were imprisoned with Kozminski.

But Kozminski's attorney J. Patrick Maginnis said he had talked with others who had been interned with his client and they did not believe him to be a collaborator.
