= Violet Oppenshaw =

British singer

- Born: Violet Ella Kay; 3 June 1888; Bayswater, London, U.K.
- Died: 21 June 1975 (aged 87); Havant, Hampshire, U.K.
- Other names: Violet Webber, Violet Openshaw
- Occupation: Singer
- Relatives: Henry Kay (uncle); Anton Dolin (cousin)

Violet Ella Oppenshaw Webber (3 June 1888 – 21 June 1975), born Violet Ella Kay, was a British contralto singer. Her stage name was sometimes printed as Openshaw.

== Early life and education ==
Oppenshaw was born in Bayswater, London, the daughter of Alfred Harvey Kay and Emily Jane Kay; her father was a military officer. Cricketer Henry Kay was her uncle, and dancer Anton Dolin was her cousin. She attended the Guildhall School of Music and Drama, and studied privately with Helen Armstrong, Pietro Neri-Baraldi, Allen Gill, and Henry Wood.

== Career ==
Oppenshaw was a contralto singer, mainly heard in oratorio performances. She made her London debut in 1907, at Aeolian Hall. and sang at holiday concerts in Wales in 1909. She was a soloist when the Western District Choral Society performed Handel's Messiah at Wormwood Scrubs prison in 1911. "She is apt to get intensity of expression at the cost not only of the rhythm but the tempo of her music," a 1913 Birmingham reviewer said of Oppenshaw. "At present she is inclined to underline her favourite emotional effects a trifle too thickly." The same reviewer in 1914 still found her "over-eager", but concluded that she was "a promising young singer." In 1914 she sang at a London benefit for the Women's Emergency Corps.

Oppenshaw can be heard on dozens of recordings between 1910 and 1917, including a 1917 recording of The Mikado by the D'Oyly Carte Opera Company. She was a member of the "Zono Minstrels" quartet, white singers performing British-composed "plantation songs" in recordings for the Zonophone label.

In 1922, Oppenshaw sang songs by composers Easthope Martin, Landon Ronald, and May Brahe at the Enoch Ballad Concerts in Westminster. She appeared on musical programs in Bournemouth in 1923.

== Personal life and legacy ==
Oppenshaw married naval officer James Trery Webber in 1914. They had a daughter, Margaret. They celebrated their 60th wedding anniversary in 1974, and she died in 1975, at the age of 87, at her daughter's home in Havant, Hampshire. The Guildhall School of Music and Drama has a Violet Openshaw Memorial Prize, for the outstanding contralto student at the school.
