= Cole Bartiromo =

American blogger and convicted felon

- Born: Cole Anthony Bartiromo; August 5, 1985 (age 41)
- Other name: The Dollar Scholar
- Known for: Owner of NewsBall.com; Supporter of Donald Trump; Creator of two web-based securities frauds as a 16 & 17-year-old in high school; Stella Award for dumb lawsuits for suing his high school for $50,000,000 after he was kicked off the baseball team
- Criminal charges: Two SEC enforcement actions; Civil Penalty $1,273,371; Mail and wire fraud; Bank fraud; 33 month federal prison sentence
- Website: newsball.com

Cole Bartiromo, now going by Cole Anthony, is an American blogger, formerly accused scammer, convicted felon, and public speaker from Mission Viejo, California. He has engaged in various financial schemes and other activities that have garnered him national media coverage; appearances on shows such as MoneyTrack, The Dr. Phil Show, and Dateline NBC; civil penalties from the U.S. Securities and Exchange Commission; and federal prison time.

When Bartiromo was very young, he had a desire for fast-and-easy moneymaking not only out of avarice but also his family's poor financial situation, where the Bartiromos faced bankruptcy twice and a home foreclosure in the 1990s. His first online financial frauds were done with his father in 2000, when he went around eBay taking money from would-be sports card collectors. The next year, while still in high school, he ran two online securities fraud operations that got him in trouble with the SEC. From May to July of that year, he ran a pump-and-dump scheme that made a net profit of more than $91,000, and from November 1 to December 15, he operated the service Invest Better 2001 (IB2001), which advertised "guaranteed" and "risk-free" returns for investing in sporting investments. The 1,000-plus people, in total, invested $1.6 million into IB2001's programs, but none of them had any money regained.

The SEC filed an enforcement charge against IB2001 on December 13, 2001, and, with the help of research by two sports card collectors previously scammed by Bartiromo, identified the 17-year-old as the person behind IB2001 on January 7, 2002. On that day, he garnered national news attention for being the second youngest person, at the time, to commit an online fraud, behind a 15-year-old New Jersey resident named Jonathan Lebed. Due to the SEC's IB2001 charge and another one filed on April 7, 2002, against Bartiromo for his pump-and-dump scheme, he not only had to give the victims their money back but also face a $1.2 million civil penalty that ballooned to $2.7 million in 2010 due to interest. He was also taxed by the Internal Revenue Service $1.1 million for running Invest Better 2001. In 2004, as a result of charges by the SEC for mail and wire fraud and bank fraud for eBay scams and bank account wiring schemes he committed in 2003, he faced a 33-month federal prison sentence and was prohibited from using the internet as part of his probation until 2010.

In the 2010s, Bartiromo again received attention from the media for two reasons. One of them was for his involvement in running the crime investigation blog NewsBall, particularly its posts relating to the murder of Skylar Neese; started in 2013, the blog revealed private details about crimes and incidents not normally covered by mainstream news outlets for ethical reasons. During the 2016 presidential election, he was being covered in the national news for his activities as a supporter of Donald Trump, posting anti-Muslim messages on his Facebook page and facing a cut on his forehead while fighting with protesters at Costa Mesa.

== Personal life ==
Cole Bartiromo is the oldest of three children (one son and two daughters). His parents were John Bartiromo (born circa 1958), who had sixteen years of working as a material handler at Southern California Edison as of 2002, and Jeanise (also born circa 1958), a junior college instructor where she taught to interpreters and also ran a daycare.

== Financial activities ==
=== 1990s: Background ===
When he was a young kid, Bartiromo had a "growing obsession with making money." This was first evident when he sold candy bars to his neighbors as part of fundraising events for his little league baseball team and set the prices a few dollars higher than what he was allowed to sell them at. In addition to greed, both Bartiromo and his father attributed his focus for quick wealth on his family's financial struggles.

The family faced bankruptcy twice through the 1990s. By April 1993, their $2,800 monthly income was around $200 below what they were required to pay, including a time-share at the Las Vegas-based Jockey Club Resort, which they owed $4,000. John sold the share in April 2001 in order to pay for his kids' college education. In 1993, the family filed for bankruptcy at Santa Ana's U.S. Bankruptcy Court. The debts were discharged by the court in June 1993.

In April 1997, they filed bankruptcy again, this time from John failing to pay over $23,000 of his mortgage, further worsened by a lender increasing the amount to $237,419. The court chose to dismiss it in May 1997 and prohibited another petition for six months, resulting in the family's three-bedroom and two-bath home being foreclosed by a bank in the summer of that year. The Bartiromos stayed in the home by having John's sister, Donna Smallwood, pay the mortgage. In 1998, the Bartiromos paid Smallwood for the house and refinanced the mortgage loan in November 1999.

=== 1999–2001: Sports card trading and pump-and-dump scheme ===
Around the time the loan was refinanced, Cole and his father started to become involved in sports cards trading on eBay, working under the screenname "TigerWoods." The two performed double-digit-dollar sports card scams on eBay, taking money from (to them) anonymous, faceless collectors. Cole's peers were aware of his obsession with sports cards and were annoyed by his boasts of profiting off them; one of his classmates recalled in 2002 that the space of Bartiromos' living room was taken up by sports memorabilia such as signs, pictures, and posters.

In the fall of 2000, at the age of 16, Bartiromo learned about Tiger Woods cards that came with issues of Sports Illustrated for Kids going up in value. He bought several issues, cut out two Tiger Woods cards from them, and made $240,000 off auctioning the cards, which led him to being interviewed on ESPN's Page 2 series. His father, taking $235,000 of it, allowed Cole to open a stock account that started with the other $5,000.

Using his stock account, Bartiromo ran a pump-and-dump scheme from May 14, 2001 to July 5, 2001. He bought large amounts of penny stocks, for some days close to half of the volume, and spread more than 6,000 messages on message boards falsely hyping up the stocks. Fifteen publicly traded companies bought into the messages, and Bartiromo traded millions of shares with them; as a result, their stock prices went down. In one night, his stock account went up from $5,000 to $50,000 from the scheme, and the net profit he made totaled more than $91,000. While operating the scheme, he was shocked how easy it was to dupe trading companies into fraudulent stock offers on the web.

=== 2001–03: Invest Better 2001 ===
From November 1 to December 15, 2001, when Bartiromo was a senior in high school, he operated a securities fraud service named Invest Better 2001 (IB2001), which consisted of a website and a MSN Networks Communities bulletin board that shut down on December 15. IB2001 advertised itself as being for "guaranteed" and "risk-free" investments bet on professional and college sporting events: "we don't just bet on favorites to win, we bet on really favored teams." The site also stated it wasn't like other "Ponzi scheme" sites in that "we actually do invest."

The service offered four get-rich-quick programs: a "125% 3 Day Ongoing Program," where an investor would get 125% of what he invested; the "250% 1 Week Ongoing Program," which promised a 250% return in a week; the "1250% 1 Month Program," where the consumer received 1250% of what he financed into IB2001; and the "2500% Christmas Miracle Program," which promised 2500% if the money was invested into the site between November 1 and December 15, 2001.

Most victims of IB2001 claimed they were seduced into it due to the "warm" and "witty" professionalism of Tom Manning, an alias Bartiromo used when acting as the leader of the service. His messages to the investors would include comments making fun of the U.S. Securities and Exchange Commission (SEC) and comparing the government agency to the Nineteen Eighty-Four character Big Brother.

To make the operation uncatchable to law enforcement, Bartiromo kept transferring the funds to different e-commerce sites to avoid them, although he told his investors it was simply to prevent the funds from being hacked.

As the SEC was starting to investigate IB2001, he took down the website on December 1. On IB2001's message boards, he instructed investors to post "NO NEGATIVE COMMENTS" and erased all the rants about the service, also blocking SEC lawyers from commenting. He also masked its shutdown to investors as done by "hackers" instead of himself. On December 9, he sent out an email reassuring his customers that IB2001 was the "real deal" and the rants were nothing more than "ridiculous," grooming the investors by calling them "pioneers" who are "like those selected for Noah's Arc." He also announced in the same message that IB2001 would turn into a "private," email-only operation. In a quick final method to trick new clients, IB2001's last announcement would be that it would be "closed" to new investors on December 15, 2001; That was the day its MSN message boards actually shut down.

In the end, Bartiromo made approximately $1.6 million off swindling around 3,300 investors out of their money. He used around $900,000 of it to put it into an online account held at a Costa Rica-based casino.

==== The search for IB2001's administrator ====
Quickly after IB2001 began, complaints started to fill up its bulletin boards, which caused the SEC to examine the service. The SEC first emailed Bartiromo, as his Manning alias, on November 19; Manning responded by lying that IB2001 had "ceased operations" and that only a few "Internet buddies" ran it and made only around $5,000 from it. In the end of that month, the SEC called Danny Matson, whose name was used as a credit for being an administrator and billing contact for IB2001. The commission learned Matson actually knew nothing about the securities fraud and that he really was a sports card collector who was owed $25,000 for a card a man named Tim Marino offered him online. The SEC noticed that the name sounded very similar to Tom Manning.

Matson then phoned San Jose sports card collector Ramon Sanchez, another one of Marino's victims who bought a Michael Jordan rookie card from him in October 2001 but never actually got it. The first email Sanchez received about buying the card was from an email address that included Bartiromo's last name. The email instructed him to go to an instant message program account named "Tigercards" to arrange the purchase. The man using the account identified himself as Tim Marino. The deal involved Marino directing Sanchez to PayPal-send money to an online betting account that was under Matson's name.

Both Matson and Sanchez decided to search for the operator of IB2001 by contacting its clients, one of them sending the investor forum of the service's message boards. It featured a comment from an account named mariners116, whom the two suspected was run by Bartiromo given that he was a big fan of the Seattle Mariners according to his friends. They also placed the contact names the scammer used ("Tigercards," "Tom Marino," "Bartiromo," "Tom Manning") in an internet search engine and, through it, found ESPN's story of Bartiromo's 2000 auctioning of the Tiger Woods cards. The two sent all of this information to the SEC, and the commission identified the person behind IB2001 as Bartiromo on January 7, 2002, among other ten other anonymous "John and Jane Does" involved.

==== Charges and settlements ====
On December 13, 2001, the SEC filed an enforcement charge against the service. It claimed violations of Sections 5(a), 5(c) and 17(a) of the 1933 Securities Act, Section 10(b) of the 1934 Securities Exchange Act, and Rule 10b-5, and argued that the claims of the investment being non-risky were "materially false and misleading," because "gambling by its very nature requires the undertaking of risk." On January 7, 2002, an amended complaint was filed by the SEC in the United States District Court for the Southern District of New York that identified Bartiromo and another ten "John and Jane Does." Thanks to a partial judgment issued by the court that same day, Bartiromo was prohibited from doing further online investment services, had all of his and IB2001's assets frozen, and was forced to disgorge any IB2001 assets into the court's account.

On April 29, 2002, the SEC filed another complaint against Bartiromo for the pump-and-dump scheme, citing violations of Section 17(a) of the Securities Act, Section 10(b) of the Securities Exchange Act of 1934, and Rule 10b-5. A partial final settlement was ordered by the court on May 29 requiring him to disgorge all of the money made from the scheme. Throughout the entire history of these charges, Bartiromo pleaded the fifth.

On May 4, 2005, a final order was made for the two complaints, a civil penalty of $1,273,371 imposed on Bartiromo by Judge Barbara S. Jones. As the court reasoned, "the boldness of the fraud conclusively demonstrates the Defendant's high level of scienter, and because the risk of loss and the actual loss was substantial. The scheme ensnared approximately 5,000 victims, and would have continued to mushroom had Bartiromo not been caught." In the case, Bartiromo stated he was broke after returning money to the participants, but Jones dismissed the claim after the SEC introduced evidence that he "owned a collection of sports cards worth several hundred thousand dollars."

==== Reactions ====
Shortly after the January 7, 2002 settlement, Bartiromo received attention from national news outlets covering his scam, one of them being the Chicago Tribune: "Though Bartiromo isn't the youngest person to run afoul of the SEC--in 2000, a 15-year-old from New Jersey agreed to forfeit more than $270,000 in profits from promoting, and then selling, little-known stocks--the dynamics of this case are extraordinary because it took in so many investors who apparently were either won over by claims that were clearly too good to be true, or willing to take a chance anyway."

The same day the news articles were being published, Bartiromo became a celebrity at the school, so much so that a teacher asked him for his autograph. He was heavily talked about by teachers and classmates at his high school. There were debates in civics classes about whether Bartiromo was to be blamed or the lack of thinking on the victims. Some students found his scheme to be "heroic," "smart and gutsy," according to the Los Angeles Times. Bartiromo's baseball coach P.J. Sandoval explained that they were "amazed how a minor can pull off such an intricate scheme," elaborating that he was "pretty patient, tenacious[,] risky [and] genius too." Bartiromo's neighbors and other acquaintances were also shocked, given that, while he operated IB2001, they only noticed him acting ordinary for a teenager, like watching other people's dogs, working at a pizzeria, shooting hoops, and successfully attending all of his baseball practices. During a winter game he played, his father apologized to the attending parents for the media coverage of his son's scam.

On May 17, 2003, A Los Angeles Times article was published about Bartiromo filing a $50 million lawsuit against Trabuco Hills High School for kicking him off the school's baseball team; he argued that the school didn't give him due process, thus indicating the school's decisions were based on "personal vendettas" and their "own jealousy/anger/spite of Bartiromo's local fame." Describing the suit as switching "between standard legal language and occasional high school jargon," the Times article claimed that he acted as his own attorney and filed the suit at the U.S. District Court in Santa Ana. There has been no further update of the case.

=== 2003–10: Wells Fargo, eBay frauds, and later punishments ===
In 2003, Bartiromo scammed successful North American eBay bidders out of money they used for buying telephones, tire rims, and other items that he never shipped.

Then, on August 24 of that year, Bartiromo tried to wire $450,000 out of an account from a Wells Fargo bank in Mission Viejo in order to have money for gambling with a London sportsbook. He asked, under false identification given by 20-year-old Theo Liu, to wire the account as well as cash the checks made from the eBay scam. The employee, who was recruited by Oscar Godinez, also 20 years old, for Bartiromo, told the bank's supervisor about the possible fraud. The supervisor contacted the United States Secret Service, which set up a dummy account for Bartiromo to transfer the money to. The agency arrested him after the transfer, and on January 30, 2004, he was charged with bank fraud.

In a newspaper interview published that same day, Bartiromo claimed he was only going to use $40,000 of the money in the account, the other money going to Godinez and Liu. He also argued that the government set him up for the fraud, but this was denied by a Los Angeles attorney spokesman named Them Mrozek. On March 1, 2004, Bartiromo pleaded guilty to not only the bank fraud charge but also mail and wire fraud for his eBay scam, which he admitted to doing during his plea. At the time, having these two charges guaranteed a maximum federal prison sentence of 35 years; however, Judge John F. Walter, when sentencing Bartiromo at the United States District Court for the Central District of California on June 14, reduced the penalty to 33 months of jail time and $20,000 restitution based on Bartiromo's denouncements of his claims that the government tried to frame him and his father's request for leniency. He did time at Kern County starting July 5, 2004. He was still under probation, meaning he was not allowed to use the internet, after his sentence was finished until 2010. From November 2009 to late July 2010, he was incarcerated for using a prohibited cellphone in a halfway house. He completed his required service in the halfway house in September 2010.

=== 2009–10: Aftermath ===
By December 2010, Bartiromo was living with his family, unemployed and poor; his 2005 $1.2 million penalty rose to $2.7 million due to interest, and he was also taxed $1.1 million by the IRS for IB2001. In September 2009, he was interviewed on a season three episode of the show MoneyTrack about his online scams, titled "Lessons From a High School Scam Artist."

From the 2000s decade to 2010, Bartiromo spoke in various interviews and criminal testimonies about turning his life around, aspiring to write a movie, a book, and rap songs about his life, own the Seattle Mariners, and work as an entrepreneur. Reflecting on the scams, he opined that while he regretted the online crimes he committed, his victims were partially at fault: "If you decide to invest, you're taking a risk, you're making a gamble, so hopefully you put in your research."

Bartiromo had a brief stint in 2010 performing public speaking events about the consequences of the schemes he committed at schools such as UC Berkeley in the summer and California State Polytechnic University, Pomona in December. These events showed his first presentation of his brand known as The Dollar Scholar.

== NewsBall ==
In 2013, Bartiromo began Newsball, a blog that was initially meant to present his social media pranks; on Facebook, he created fake profiles of notorious people being covered by popular news sources, including Jared Lee Loughner and James DiMaggio. He documented responses from users towards the profiles on the blog. He would continue pulling off these types of pranks in 2016, when on July 17 of that year, the day Gavin Eugene Long murdered six policemen in Baton Rouge, Louisiana, Bartiromo set up a hoax account on Facebook that was under Long's name. The profile picture was not of Long but of another black man wearing a white cap. The account was suspended a day after it began.

Later in 2013, however, Newsball transitioned into a blog exposing information most mainstream news outlets would otherwise not share publicly for ethical reasons, including the names of those only somewhat related to incidents, victims, and underage people that have committed crimes. His actions on the blog when related to notable news stories included uploading pictures of Paul Walker's dead body in a car crash, and criticizing the jurors of George Zimmerman's murder trial for ruling against the defendant.

The blog gained notoriety thanks to its investigation of the murder of a 16-year-old girl from West Virginia named Skylar Neese. Before Neese's two underage killers were charged, Bartiromo looked for the names of them by scouring social media profiles; in addition to posting the names publicly on Newsball, he used their accounts of the killers and their friends to post several videos and photos of them as well as posting the names of the friends that refused to answer his questions. According to Daleen Berry, who wrote a book about Neese's death, she received emails from the teenagers Bartiromo contacted that claimed he threatened them and their families for information; these claims were denied by Bartiromo in 2014.

Bartiromo's searches received the attention of shows such as Dateline and The Dr. Phil Show and garnered him appearances on them. However, the shows left out his Newsball work and only presented that he was involved in investigating Neese's death. In describing Bartiromo's appearance on The Dr. Phil Show, The Daily Beast writer Stephanie Diani wrote that "he sat in the front row wearing a size-too-large suit and fought with several of the onstage guests."

Diani found Bartiromo running a website like Newsball odd: "this man who blames the media for his own inescapable past now seems to wants to make a name for himself, at least in part, by destroying the reputations of others. Bartiromo wants a second chance by denying one to anyone else."

== 2016: Trump rally incident ==
On April 28, 2016, during the 2016 presidential election, Bartiromo went to a rally for the candidate he supported, Donald Trump, held at Costa Mesa's Pacific Amphitheatre. Trump autographed Bartiromo's $500 bill after his speech.

Bartiromo was still wearing his "Make America Great Again" hat when outside.

While outside, a protester knocked Bartiromo's hat off. When trying to retrieve it, he hit his head and suffered a 1-inch cut.
