= Samuel Marinus Zwemer =

American missionary, traveler, and scholar (1867–1952)

- Born: April 12, 1867; Vriesland, Michigan, U.S.
- Died: April 2, 1952 (aged 84); New York City, U.S.
- Education: Hope College; New Brunswick Theological Seminary
- Spouse: Amy Elizabeth Wilkes
- Children: Amy Katherina Boon, 1897–1904, Nellie Elizabeth, 1899 –, Ruth, 1900–1904, Raymund Lull, 1902–1981, Amy Ruth, 1905–2002, Mary Moffat, 1907

Samuel Marinus Zwemer (April 12, 1867 – April 2, 1952), nicknamed The Apostle to Islam, was an American missionary, traveler, and scholar. He was born at Vriesland, Michigan. In 1887 he received an A.B. from Hope College in Holland, Michigan, and in 1890, he received an M.A. from New Brunswick Theological Seminary in New Brunswick, New Jersey His other degrees include a D.D. from Hope College in 1904, a L.L.D. from Muskingum College in 1918, and a D.D. from Rutgers College in 1919.

After being ordained to the Reformed Church ministry by the Pella, Iowa Classis in 1890, he was a missionary at Busrah, Bahrein, and at other locations in Arabia from 1891 to 1905. He was a member of the Arabian Mission (1890–1913). He is the founder of American Mission Hospital in Bahrain.

Zwemer served in Egypt from 1913 to 1929. He also traveled widely in Asia Minor, and he was elected a fellow of the Royal Geographical Society of London.

On 1 October 1930, he was appointed at the Princeton Theological Seminary, as the Professor of the History of Religion and Christian Missions, where he taught until 1937. He had married Amy Elizabeth Wilkes on May 18, 1896. He was famously turned down by the American Missionary Society, which resulted in him going overseas alone. He founded and edited the publication The Moslem World for 35 years. He was influential in mobilizing many Christians, especially doctors, nurses, preachers and teachers, to go into missionary work in Islamic countries.

Zwemer retired from active work on the faculty of Princeton College Seminary at the age of seventy, but continued to write and publish books and articles as well as doing a great deal of public speaking. Zwemer died in New York City at the age of eighty-four.

According to Ruth A. Tucker, PhD, Samuel Zwemer's converts were "probably less than a dozen during his nearly forty years of service" but his "greatest contribution to missions was that of stirring Christians to the need for evangelism among Muslims".

== Career ==
In his biography of Raymond Lull, Zwemer divided Lull's ministry threefold and we may use the same broad categories to examine Zwemer's own ministry: Evangelism, Writing and Recruitment.

=== Evangelism ===
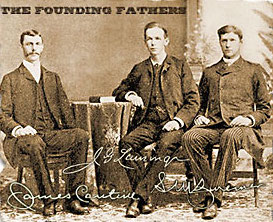
James Cantine, J.G. Lansing, and Samuel M. Zwemer, Founding Fathers of Arabian Mission for the Reformed Church of America

In 1889, Zwemer co-founded with James Cantine at the Seminary, the American Arabian Mission. Zwemer saw his first milestone in his ministry as leaving for Arabia in 1890 to work directly with the Muslim community. At this time, his main mode of evangelism was distribution of literature and personal conversation. He combined models of confrontational and a more irenic approach of presenting the love of Christ, 'characteristic of the student volunteers'. Stories of his spontaneous interaction with people suggest that he was a capable and creative personal evangelist.

=== Writing ===
In the tradition of Lull, Zwemer 'left behind a mighty highway of print almost a book a year in English for over half a century.' As part of this great literary undertaking, he settled in Cairo in 1912 to work with the Nile Mission Press to make it 'a production point for Christian Literature for Muslims.' As an outcome of the Edinburgh World Missionary Conference in 1910, he established the quarterly The Moslem World in 1911 because 'If the Churches of Christendom are to reach the Moslem world with the Gospel, they must know of it and know it.' He edited it until 1947, paying for much of it out of his own pocket. He founded the American Christian Literature Society for Moslems (A.C.L.S.M) which raised over a quarter of a million dollars for the production of evangelical literature. Its Constitution expressed Zwemer's belief that the printed page 'has a unique value as a means of carrying the Gospel to Mohammedans... [it] finds an entrance into many doors closed to the living witness and can proclaim the Gospel persistently, fearlessly and effectively.' Zwemer saw printed page as 'the "leaves for the healing of the nations" in his program of mission strategy.'

=== Recruitment ===
Zwemer's third milestone was accepting a professorship at Princeton in 1929 and marked an era of equipping and recruiting for the missionary movement, though this had been a significant aspect of his career from the beginning. In an extended period of furlough he was a traveling representative for the Student Volunteer Movement, and his speaking ability in motivating for missions was legendary. His itinerary was herculean: in America in 1914 he gave 151 addresses in 113 days across the country. W.H.T. Gairdner called him 'a steam engine in breeches'. His talent for fundraising was equally impressive, one year raising $32,886 for the Reformed Board of Foreign Missions, when the salary of a missionary on the field at this time was $900 a year. J. Christy Wilson Jr. summarizes: 'Speer and Zwemer probably influenced more young men and women to go into missionary service than any two individuals in all of Christian history.'

== Legacy ==
As a result of his direct pioneering work, four mission stations had been set up, and though only small in number, 'the converts showed unusual courage in professing their faith.' The resulting church in Bahrain of the National Evangelical Church of Bahrain continues to this day. It is impossible to know how many people were affected by the large volume of tracts and scripture that he helped distribute. His books continue to make a significant difference today and his quarterly journal remains in publication as a significant scholarly journal. Through the work of the Student Volunteer Movement, with which Zwemer was strongly connected, 14,000 young people went out to the mission field. The Zwemer Center offers comprehensive courses on Islam, facilitates research, fosters dialogues, offers seminars, conducts training, and provides resources.

== Beliefs ==
=== Theology ===
Zwemer's theology, following the Calvinism of his parents, was that he saw the supremacy of God in all things. The Bible was programmatic in his faith and his thinking of his ministry, and emanated in his vocabulary. He studied Islamic Doctrine of God, initially drawing stark contrasts with the God of the Bible, then nuancing his view over time. He praised the all encompassing idea of God in Islam, seeing it as the 'Calvinism of the Orient,' and even placed the Bismillah on his study wall in Cairo and on the cover of his journal "The Moslem World". He saw Islam's grasp of Monotheism as its great strength and yet also its great deficiency. For him, without an understanding of the Trinity, God was unknowable and impersonal. Hence, he cherished the doctrines of the Incarnation and the Atonement, writing major works on the topics: The Glory of the Manger and, his favorite, The Glory of the Cross. Though a stumbling block for Muslims, he saw them as crucial in evangelism. Zwemer's God was glorious and all-encompassing: 'never be satisfied with compromise or concessions', demanding instead 'unconditional surrender'.

=== Missiology ===
Zwemer's all-encompassing vision of God was the driving force of his missiology: 'The chief end of missions is not the salvation of men but the glory of God.' He sees this grand vision as coming directly from Calvin: 'God has created the entire world that it should be the theater of his glory by the spread of his Gospel.' It was this unshakable belief in the infinite power and supremacy of God that drove Zwemer to the 'cradle of Islam' as a demonstration of the 'Glory of the Impossible'. His confidence of the victory of the Gospel in the Middle East was equally unshakable. Still, this missiology of victory is fundamentally shaped by the cross: 'Christ is a conqueror whose victories have always been won through loss and humiliation and suffering.' This was hardly academic for Zwemer, since he had lost his brother and two daughters in the field. Lyle Vander Werff describes Zwemer's missiological approach as 'Christocentric-anthropological', that is, the Gospel message is the greatest need of the Muslim as opposed to Western Civilization or 'philanthropic programs of education'. Zwemer summarizes his theology of mission: 'With God's sovereignty as basis, God's glory as goal, and God's will as motive, the missionary enterprise today can face the most difficult of all missionary tasks—the evangelization of the Moslem world.'

=== Ecclesiology ===
For Zwemer, the Church was precious because it was indeed 'the Church of God which He purchased with His own blood.' His view on denominations was ecumenical and generous and far from the parochial tendency occasionally demonstrated in the Reformed tradition. The Arabian Board he set up was expressly 'undenominational.' He is able to praise Popes Gregory VII and Innocent III. He longed for the day Oriental Orthodox Churches would join in with Muslim evangelism. His opening editorial for The Moslem World stated that it aimed 'to represent no faction or fraction of the Church, but to be broad in the best sense of the word.' His slogan was: 'In essentials it seeks unity, in non-essentials liberty, and in all things charity.' Yet, he was clear and precise about what the essentials were. Such desire for ecumenism was fed by his all-pervasive passion for mission to Islam: 'the issues at stake are too vital and the urgency too great for anything but united front.'

== Works ==
Besides editing The Moslem World, a quarterly scholarly periodical – 37 vols.(1911–47), and the Quarterly Review (London), he wrote the following books:

- Arabia, the Cradle of Islam (1900)
- Topsy Turvy Land (1902), with his wife, Mrs. Amy E. Zwemer
- Raymond Lull (1902)
- Moslem Doctrine of God (1906)
- The Mohammedan World of Today (1906)
- Islam: a challenge to faith: studies on the Mohammedan religion and the needs and opportunities of the Mohammedan world (1907)
- Our Moslem sisters: a cry of need from lands of darkness interpreted by those who heard it, (1907) — edited with Annie van Sommer
- The Moslem World (1908)
- The Nearer and Farther East: Outline studies of Moslem lands, and of Siam, Burma, and Korea (1908), with Arthur Judson Brown
- The Unoccupied Mission Fields (1910)
- Islam and missions: being papers read at the second Missionary conference on behalf of the Mohammedan world at Lucknow, January 23–28, 1911 (1911)
- The Moslem Christ (1911)
- The Unoccupied Mission Fields of Africa and Asia (1911)
- Daylight in the Harem: A New Era For Moslem Women (1911) — Papers on present-day reform movements, conditions and methods of work among Moslem women read at the Lucknow Conference
- Zigzag Journeys in the Camel Country (1912)
- Childhood in the Moslem World (1915)
- Mohammed or Christ? An account of the rapid spread of Islam in all parts of the globe, the methods employed to obtain proselytes, its immense press, its strongholds, & suggested means to be adopted to counteract the evil (1916)
- The Disintegration of Islam (1916) — student lectures on missions at Princeton TS
- A Moslem Seeker after God: Showing Islam at its best in the life and teaching of al-Ghazali, mystic and theologian of the eleventh century (1920)
- The Influence of Animism on Islam : An Account of Popular Superstitions (1920)
- "Christianity the Final Religion", Eerdmans-Sevensma Co., Grand Rapids, MI, (1920)
- The Moslem World, Volume 4 (1914)
- The Moslem World, Volume 8 (1918)
- The Moslem World, Volume 9 (1919)
- The Moslem World, Volume 10 (1919)
- The Moslem World, Volume 11 (1919)
- The Moslem World, Volume 12 (1919)
- The Law of Apostasy in Islam (1924)
- Moslem Women (1926), with his wife, Mrs. Amy E. Zwemer
- The Glory of the Cross (1928)
- Across the world of Islam (1929)
- The exalted name of Christ (1932), translated from Arabic by Oskar Hermansson and Gustaf Ahlbert, assisted by Abdu Vali Akhond
- Thinking Missions with Christ (1934)
- Taking hold of God : studies on the nature, need and power of prayer (1936)
- It's Hard To Be A Christian: Some Aspects of the Fight for Character in the Life of the Pilgrim (1937)
- The Solitary Throne, addresses Given at the Keswick Convention on the Glory and Uniqueness of the Christian Message (1937)
- The Golden Milestone : Reminiscences of Pioneer Days Fifty Years in Arabia (1938), with James Cantine
- Dynamic Christianity and the World Today (1939)
- Studies in Popular Islam: A Collection of papers dealing with the Superstitions & Beliefs of the Common People (1939)
- The Glory of the Manger: Studies on the Incarnation (1940)
- The Art of Listening to God (1940)
- The Cross Above the Crescent (1941)
- Islam in Madagascar (1941)
- Into All the World (1943)
- Evangelism Today: Message Not Method (1944)
- The Origin of Religion: Evolution or Revelation (1945) — based on the Smyth Lectures 1935
- Heirs of the Prophets (1946)
- A factual survey of the Moslem world with maps and statistical tables (1946)
- The Glory of the Empty Tomb (1947)
- How Rich the Harvest (1948)
- Sons of Adam: Studies of Old Testament characters in New Testament light (1951)
- Social And Moral Evils Of Islam (2002) — reprint of an earlier work

He also wrote an article describing his travels in Oman and the Trucial Coast (now U.A.E.), which famously features the earliest known photograph of the Qasr al-Hosn in Abu Dhabi:

- Three Journeys in Northern Oman (1902), The Geographical Journal, Vol XIX, No1

== See also ==
- San Geronimo (disambiguation)
- William Whiting Borden

== Works in Print (2007) ==
- Call to Prayer Diggory Press, ISBN 978-1-84685-290-9
- Heirs of the Prophets Diggory Press, ISBN 978-1-84685-356-2
- Raymund Lull: First Missionary to the Moslems Diggory Press, ISBN 978-1-84685-301-2
- The Glory of the Cross Diggory Press, ISBN 978-1-84685-353-1
- The Law of Apostasy in Islam Diggory Press, ISBN 978-1-84685-300-5
- The Moslem Christ Diggory Press, ISBN 978-1-905363-12-4
- The Moslem Doctrine of God Diggory Press, ISBN 978-1-84685-240-4
- The Moslem World
- The Influence of Animism on Islam: An Account of Popular Superstitions

== Bibliography ==
- Wilson, J. Christy, Apostle to Islam. A biography of Samuel M. Zwemer, Grand Rapids, MI: Baker Book House, 1952.
- Wilson, J. Christy, Flaming Prophet: The Story of Samuel Zwemer, New York: Friendship Press, 1970.
- Greenway, Roger S. (Editor), Islam and the Cross: Selections from "The Apostle to Islam", P and R Publishing, 2002.
- Ipema, P. (Peter), The Islam interpretations of Duncan B. Macdonald, Samuel M. Zwemer, A. Kenneth Cragg and Wilfred C. Smith, Thesis (Ph.D.) - Hartford Seminary Foundation, 1971.
- The vital forces of Christianity and Islam: Six studies by missionaries to Moslems / with an introduction by the Rev. S. M. Zwemer, and a concluding study by Professor Duncan B. Macdonald, Oxford University Press, 1915.
- Janet & Geoff Benge, Samuel Zwemer: The Burden of Arabia . YWAM Publishing,2013
