= Mark E. Kalmansohn =

American attorney

- Born: June 17; Los Angeles, California U.S.
- Education: University of California, Los Angeles; UCLA School of Law
- Occupations: Entertainment Attorney, author, humanitarian
- Website: http://www.k-alaw.com

Mark E. Kalmansohn is an American attorney who was a former prosecutor for the United States Department of Justice who hunted down and brought to justice Lucian Ludwig Kozminski, a Jewish Oberkapo convicted in 1982 of swindling some 3,000 of his fellow Holocaust survivors. An Oberkapo was an SS-appointed enforcer within the German death and Nazi concentration camps during World War II.

== Early life and education ==
Kalmansohn was born in Fort Belvoir, Virginia. When he was one month old, he and his parents moved to Los Angeles, California where he grew up. He is the son of the late Dr. Robert B. Kalmansohn and the late Dr. Katherine W. Kalmansohn. Kalmansohn, who has one brother and one sister, is divorced and has a former stepson.

In 1974, after being awarded a University of California Regents Scholarship, Kalmansohn graduated summa cum laude and Phi Beta Kappa from UCLA with a Bachelor of Arts degree in political science. While at UCLA, he also took four Honors Graduate Proseminars in Political Science and became a member of the Political Science Honors Society. He also graduated from UCLA Law School in 1977, where he was a member of the Moot Court Honors Program. While serving as a legal intern for the U.S. Senate Subcommittee on Constitutional Rights (Judiciary Committee), Kalmansohn had co-authored two government publications, "Free Press-Fair Trial," and "A Citizens Guide to Individual Rights under the Constitution of the United States of America" (Fifth Ed.) While still in law school, he also wrote "The Law, Lawyers and Literature," (Lex et Scientia, Vol. 12, No. 4, Oct.-Dec. 1976). Kalmansohn received a Diploma in International Law from Darwin College, University of Cambridge at Cambridge, England in 1984. His University of Cambridge thesis, "Application of EEC Articles 86 and 87 to Foreign Multinationals," was later published by the Law Review of the University of Amsterdam (Europa Institute), Kluwer Publishers (Amsterdam, the Netherlands).

== Career ==
In the late 1970s, inspired in part by the deeds and calling of former U.S. Attorney General Robert F. Kennedy, Kalmansohn served as a trial attorney at the United States Department of Justice, Antitrust Division, which had hired him as part of the U.S. Attorney General's Employment Program for honor law graduates. Kalmansohn later served as an Assistant U.S. Attorney (Criminal Division)("AUSA") for the Central District of California, where he also served as an Assistant Division Chief for Trial Training. While an AUSA, Kalmansohn targeted white collar fraud in particular and also prosecuted terrorist bombers, hijacking, narco-cartels, organized crime, illegal shipment of weapons to Death Squads abroad, an extensive tax fraud scheme, bribery and government corruption. In 1987, Kalmansohn left a partnership at the Beverly Hills law firm of Cooper, Epstein & Hurewitz to serve as Director of North American Anti-Piracy Operations for the Motion Picture Association of America. He later served as a founding partner of McPherson & Kalmansohn, LLP, and subsequently of Kalmansohn & Andersen, LLP, where has been engaged in an entertainment and intellectual property law practice. Kalmansohn is a member of the State Bar of California, the U.S. Supreme Court Bar, and formerly the District of Columbia Bar.

== Kozminski investigation ==
Kalmansohn, a Jewish-American of Lithuanian lineage, served as a federal prosecutor from 1977 to 1983. Years after Kozminski's initial federal convictions, and still vowing rightful justice for the Holocaust survivors twice-victimized by Kozminski, Kalmansohn independently undertook a lengthy investigation and two (pro bono) civil actions to make Kozminski pay for his crimes against humanity. The majority of Kozminski's victims were elderly and many were nearly impoverished.

=== Crime ===
According to court records from his 1982 trial, Kozminski posed as a restitution counselor who charged exorbitant up-front and service fees, then pocketed German government restitution checks intended for Holocaust survivors. Kalmansohn estimated that Kozminski bilked his victims out of an estimated $1 million, which, with inflation and interest, would have been worth well over $10 million by 2002.

=== Indictments ===
Holocaust survivors Jacob Weingarten and Modka "Max" Wolman took their complaints to federal authorities, who, in turn, assigned the criminal case to Kalmansohn in 1981. After an exhaustive investigation spanning multiple continents, Kalmansohn and then U.S. Postal Inspector Lothar Fritz "Lou" Kinzler obtained grand jury indictments against Kozminski. Pleading guilty to eight counts of mail and bankruptcy fraud, Kozminski was sentenced to twelve years in federal prison.

=== Kozminski's release and supposed death ===
Bureau of Prisons records show that Kozminski was released from prison in late 1989, even though he was allegedly spotted walking a street in Beverly Hills, California, in 1987. Kozminski was also reportedly seen numerous times following his supposed death in 1993.

Amid mounting evidence which led to the belief that Kozminski could have faked his death to avoid paying Holocaust survivors, Kalmansohn filed civil suits against Kozminski on behalf of Weingarten and Wolman.

In 1999, Los Angeles County Superior Court Judge John W. Ouderkirk ruled that Kozminski's death certificate was false and/or fraudulent and that Kozminski may still be alive. In 2000, a second judge concurred in the earlier finding.

== The Hunt For A Holocaust Swindler ==
Years after Kozminski's 1982 convictions and sentencing, and disturbed that virtually none of the victims' purloined funds had been recovered, Kalmansohn continued to be haunted by the unfinished business of the Kozminski case and the mystery of Lucian Kozminski. Kalmansohn dealt with it in a non-fiction book, updated and reprinted in 2011 entitled The Hunt for a Holocaust Swindler. It was during preparation of this book that, much to his surprise, Kalmansohn discovered Kozminski's scheme to fake his own death. The book is archived by the Library of Congress in Washington, DC, and serves as a textbook for law and social science students worldwide. Feature-length segments on Kalmansohn's quest for ultimate justice have been broadcast by both Dateline NBC and America's Most Wanted. DVDs of these segments are also available at the Hunt4TheSwindler website. A portion of all proceeds will be donated to anti-genocide organizations.

"I really don't know whether Kozminski, who now would be elderly, is dead or alive," said Kalmansohn. "To cite Winston Churchill's observation on Russia, the case remains 'a riddle wrapped in a mystery inside an enigma.'"

=== Charity ===
Kalmansohn now is a full-time philanthropist, and extends his support to numerous causes stretching to 55+ non-profits globally. These causes include equal rights, women's rights, voter suppression, gun control, anti-poverty, pro-democracy, mass incarceration and police reform, climate change, health challenges in Africa, Asia and elsewhere, victims of war (such as in Syria, Ukraine and Cambodia), and other victims of violence, oppression and discrimination.

In 2021, Kalmansohn alone contributed $1.3 million almost exclusively to UCLA women's sports. https://centurycity-westwoodnews.com/ucla-athletics-receives-1-3-million-to-focus-on-women-student-athletes/. He provided the seed gift to the new Women of Westwood Endowment, established the Mark E. Kalmansohn UCLA Softball Associate Head Coach Endowment, contributed a substantial amount to several individual UCLA women's sports (and two men's sports), and seeded an Elite Award for Excellence in Coaching for UCLA "Olympic" sports coaches. He also established an annual scholarship in his mother's name in perpetuity at the UC San Francisco Medical School for a deserving female medical student, and made substantial donations to the Equal Justice Initiative, the Lawyers Committee for Civil Rights, the ACLU, the Carter Center, Doctors without Borders, the Anti-Defamation League, the NAACP, the League of Conservation Voters Education Fund, Friends of Sheba Hospital, and Four (4) UCLA Scholarship funds for underprivileged students, among many others. He also has provided advice and assistance to prominent pro-democracy leaders in Africa opposing entrenched, repressive dictatorships.

Kalmansohn's humanitarian efforts also extend to political campaigns and causes. In the 2022 election cycle alone, he contributed to nearly Fifty (50) different campaigns and PACS in over Twelve (12) States.
