= Reg Lawson =

English footballer

Reginald Openshaw Lawson (November 1880 – ?) was an English footballer. His regular position was as a forward. He was born in Bolton. He played for Manchester United and Bolton Wanderers.
