= Judith Tobin =

American medical examiner

Judith Gedney Tobin
- Education: Mount Holyoke College; Columbia University College of Physicians and Surgeons
- Occupations: Physician, activist
- Relatives: Richard Tobin (husband)
- Medical career
- Profession: Medical examiner
- Institutions: President, Nanticoke Memorial Hospital; Assistant State Medical Examiner, Sussex and Kent counties of Delaware

Judith Gedney Tobin is an American medical examiner.

An inductee of the Hall of Fame of Delaware Women, Tobin is a former Assistant State Medical Examiner for Sussex and Kent counties in Delaware. She served in that position for 35 years (1964-2009). During that period, Tobin conducted more than 5,000 autopsies. Recognizing the impact of her service, the Delaware Department of Health and Social Services named the Southern Office of the Chief Medical Examiner for Delaware after Tobin in 2006. In 2010, U.S. Representative Michael Castle recognized the impact of Tobin's work on the floor of the U.S. House of Representatives.

== Early life and education ==
In 1944, Tobin graduated from the Beard School (now Morristown-Beard School), located in Orange, New Jersey. In 1998, the Morristown-Beard School awarded her its Distinguished Alumni Award.

Tobin received her bachelor's degree from Mount Holyoke College in 1948 and received induction into the Phi Beta Kappa honor society. She earned her medical degree from the Columbia University College of Physicians and Surgeons, located in New York City, New York, in 1952. Tobin then completed her residency in pathology and internal medicine at Dartmouth Medical Center in Lebanon, New Hampshire and the U.S. Veteran's Administration Hospital in Vermont. She completed her medical internship at St. Luke's Hospital in New York City.

== Medical career ==
Tobin served as the first woman president of Nanticoke Memorial Hospital in Seaford, Delaware. She also served as president of the American Cancer Society's Delaware chapter and as a member of the Delaware Board of Medical Practice.

== Service to the community ==
Tobin helped found the Boys and Girls Club of Western Sussex County. She has served on the board of directors of Children and Families First of Delaware, which provides health services and family services. Tobin has also served on the board of directors of the Blood Bank of Delaware.

== Recognition and legacy ==
Delaware named Tobin its state Mother of the Year in 1984. In 2007, the Greater Seaford Chamber of Commerce awarded Tobin its ATHENA award, which recognizes an individual for "professional excellence, for providing valuable service to their community and for actively assisting women in realizing their full leadership potential".

== Family ==
Tobin married her husband, Richard – also a physician – during the 1960s. They had six children together: Cynthia, Pam, Patty, Richard, Jr., Clark and Stanley. Two of them went into medicine after their mother. Patty Tobin works as an anesthetist, and Richard, Jr. Tobin works as an orthopedist. Richard died in 1970.

== See also ==
- List of Columbia University alumni
- List of Mount Holyoke College people
- List of people from Delaware
