= Henry Kay =

English cricketer

Personal information
- Full name: Henry George Kay
- Born: 3 October 1851; Bedhampton, Hampshire, England
- Died: 8 September 1922 (aged 70); Tottenham, Middlesex, England
- Batting: Right-handed
- Bowling: Unknown
- Role: Wicket-keeper

Domestic team information
- Years: Team
- 1882: Hampshire

Career statistics
Competition	First-class
Matches	2
Runs scored	0
Batting average	0.00
100s/50s	–/–
Top score	0
Balls bowled	36
Wickets	0
Bowling average	–
5 wickets in innings	–
10 wickets in match	–
Best bowling	–
Catches/stumpings	–/–
- Source: Cricinfo, 8 January 2010

Henry George Kay (3 October 1851 — 18 September 1922) was an English first-class cricketer.

Kay was born in October 1851 at Bedhampton, Hampshire, with his family having originally settled from Lincolnshire. He was educated at Cheltenham College. He played first-class cricket for Hampshire on two occasions in 1882, against Sussex and Somerset. He was unsuccessful in these matches, being dismissed for ducks in both. He was the father of the ballet dancer Anton Dolin. Kay died at Tottenham in September 1922.
