= Michael Katze =

American microbiologist

Michael Katze is an American microbiologist. For over 35 years, he has researched host-virus interactions, incorporating systems biology approaches into infectious disease research. He was an international leader in the application of genome sequencing, animal models, and systems biology approaches to virology and immunology. Katze was formerly Professor of Microbiology at the University of Washington (UW), and Associate Director for Molecular Sciences and a Core Staff Scientist at the Washington National Primate Research Center. In August 2017, Katze was fired from the University of Washington for sexually harassing his employees and misusing research funds.

== Education ==
In 1971, Katze graduated from Boston University with his B.A. in biology. Initially, he was interested in dentistry, but after his first year of dental school at the University of Pennsylvania, Katze decided to take his career a different direction. Later, when Katze was working as a research assistant at the University of Pennsylvania and, simultaneously, at the Wistar Institute, he discovered his passion for virology. He attended graduate school at Hahnemann University, where he earned his Ph.D. in Microbiology and Immunology in 1980. From 1980 to 1982, he completed a post-doc in virology at the University of Uppsala in Uppsala, Sweden.

== Career ==
Until his dismissal in August 2017, Katze was a professor of microbiology and an adjunct professor in the department of bioengineering at the University of Washington. He also was a core staff scientist and associate director at the Washington National Primate Research Center (WaNPRC). In the past, Katze held research assistant positions at the University of Pennsylvania and the Wistar Institute in Philadelphia, Pennsylvania. He was also a research associate and an Assistant Member at the Sloan-Kettering Institute in New York, NY. From 1996 to 1999, he was a member of the Experimental Virology Study Section of the National Institutes of Health (NIH).

=== Sexual harassment allegations ===
In January 2016, an internal investigation by the university found that Katze had violated the school's sexual harassment policies in his relationships with two female employees; a related investigation by Washington's medical school found that he had diverted university resources for personal gain and recommended an audit. The administration, which had prohibited him from working in the lab on campus the year before, suspended his tenure rights but continued paying him.

Katze had sued both the university and BuzzFeed to prevent release of the details, which the latter reported on in June. According to the site and the legal papers, he had apparently hired the two women at higher salaries than their positions usually carried at UW, and further lavished them with cash and gifts in response for sexual favors and other personal services unrelated to the lab such as posting personal ads for him on Craigslist and soliciting prostitutes for him. At that time, the university was considering whether to fire him or not. In August 2017, Katze was fired by the University of Washington.

== Honors ==
In 1971, Katze graduated from Boston University magna cum laude and was inducted into the prestigious Phi Beta Kappa honor society. From 1980 through 1982, he received a long-term Postdoctoral Fellowship from the European Molecular Biology Organization. In 1998, he earned the Faculty Award for Undergraduate Research Mentoring from the University of Washington. That same year he was given a Travel Award for the International Society for Interferon and Cytokine Research (ISICR) Meeting in Jerusalem. One year later at the ISICR Meeting in Paris he was honored with the Milstein Award, which represents the zenith of scientific achievement in this area of research. In 2006, Katze was given the prestigious Dozor Scholar Award by the Israeli Microbiology Society. That same year, he received the Alumni Fellow Award from the Drexel University (Hahnemann University) College of Medicine. In 2014, he received the Drexel University Graduate Citation, Mid-Career and Senior Graduates Award. In 2015, Katze was elected to Fellowship in the American Academy of Microbiology.

== See also ==
- List of Boston University people
- List of Phi Beta Kappa members by year of admission
- List of University of Washington people
