= Jennifer Openshaw =

CEO of Girls with Impact

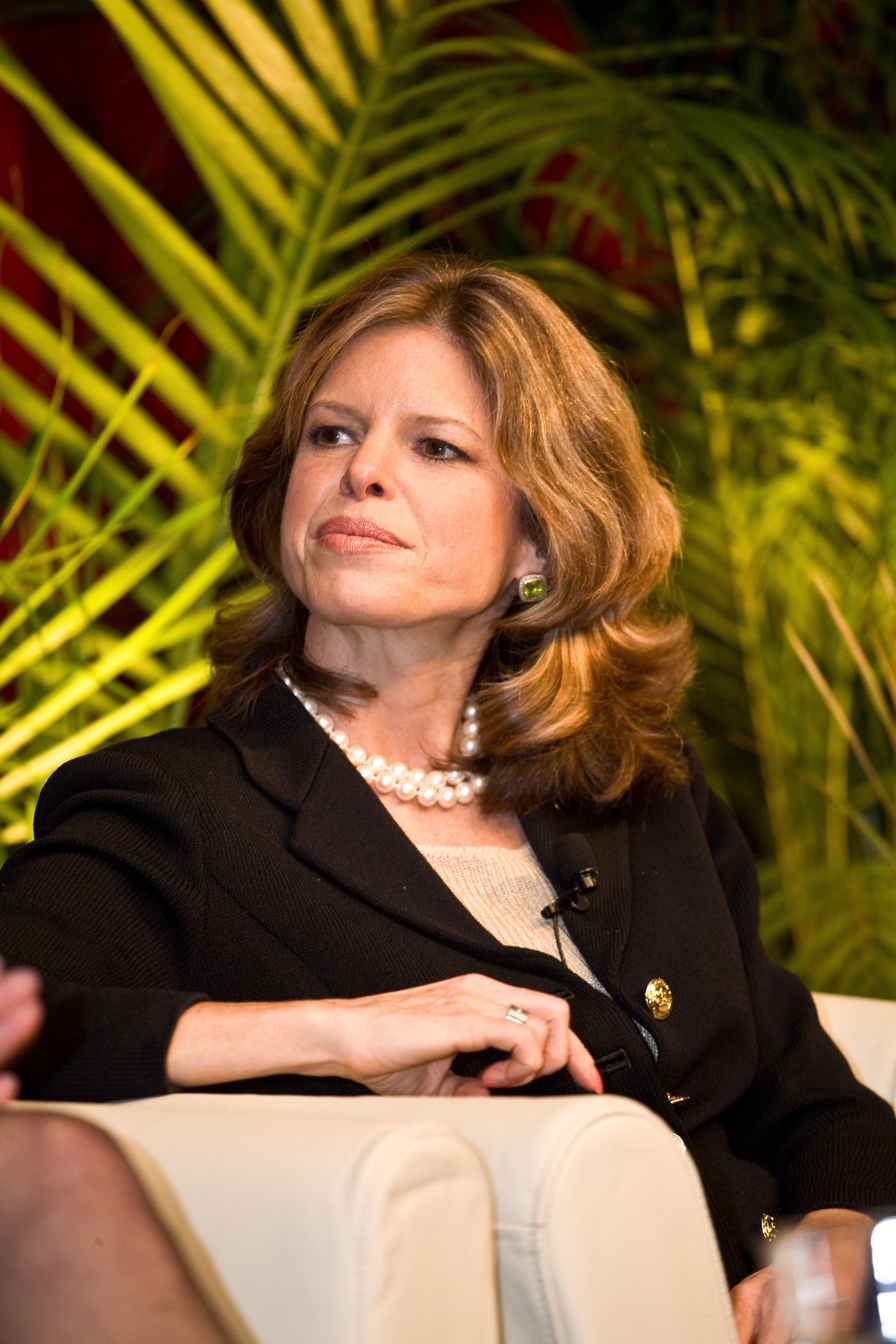

== Overview ==
Jennifer Ann Openshaw is an American entrepreneur, author, and commentator.

She is the founder and CEO of Girls With Impact, a program aimed at training girls to lead in corporate and public sectors. She is known for starting Women's Financial Network—the first online financial firm created for women and a trendsetter in the financial industry. She speaks nationwide on wealth, women and technology, and has appeared as a financial expert.

== Early life ==
When Openshaw was five years old, her parents divorced, and she was raised by her mother. At the age of seven, she began caring for her two younger brothers while her mother worked two full-time jobs as a waitress. She took her first job as a maid in a motel at the age of 14 to earn extra money.

== Education ==
=== UCLA ===
Openshaw attended three undergraduate colleges. She graduated from UCLA with a BA and an MBA in finance. She also studied at Monash University in Melbourne, Australia, which she attended as a Rotary Scholar. She then attended the UCLA Anderson School of Management, specializing in finance.

=== Active student entrepreneur ===
As an undergraduate student, Openshaw was named Finance Director of UCLA's Internship Association, where she broke the fundraising record and launched two new businesses—an annual furniture fair (“The Bruin Bear Market”) and a cookbook of politicians’ recipes, which was recognized in the San Jose Mercury News. Funds raised were used to lower the cost of student internships. Her mentor, Dean Alex White, formerly of Yale, played a critical role in her early career.

== Early career ==
In 1986, Openshaw began working for the Los Angeles City Controller while attending UCLA full-time. She purchased women's clothes from a national designer and resold them as another revenue stream to fund her college. In 1988, while recovering from back surgery, she ran the volunteer operation for two assembly districts in Los Angeles during the Presidential election. She returned to the City Controller's Office while working weekends at the NBC-TV affiliate in Bakersfield, California. In 1990, she was named press secretary to Kathleen Brown’s run for California State Treasurer. After a successful win, she became press secretary for the Treasurer's Office, responsible for 12 financing commissions and a $70B+ investment portfolio. In 1994, Openshaw was asked to join Brown's bid for Governor, running communications for the campaign against Governor Pete Wilson.

== Financial Innovator ==
=== Financial institution ===
While completing business school, she moved to the private sector, serving first in Bank of America’s Investment Management Group and then joining Wilshire Associates, where she worked closely with CEO & Founder, Dennis Tito. At Wilshire, she advocated to turn the Wilshire 5000 Index, a barometer of the market, into a real-time index. She then struck a partnership with CNBC to use it in its daily programming.

In 1999, she left Wilshire to start Women's Financial Network (WFN) in Silicon Valley. She went to then CEO of MarketWatch Larry Kramer to fund her business. That would begin a 15-year+ partnership where Openshaw became a regular columnist on finance and tech. Amid the dot-com bubble, she successfully sold WFN to Siebert Financial (NYSE:SIEB), led by Muriel Siebert. She remained there as Vice Chair while working with Microsoft Money, where she was a product advisor and national educator and spokesperson for the “Realize Your Potential” financial education campaign for women.

In 2002, she served as Senior Vice President at JP Morgan, working on innovations, solutions for the Latino community, and partnerships.

In 2004, she started Family Financial Network, to deliver consumer financial software, tools and a new model of low-cost financial planning. Her consumer products, made free to the public, were endorsed by Dr. Phil.

In 2014, she was selected as only the second Executive Director of the Financial Women's Association. As part of efforts to modernize and boost membership, she implemented a student program, developed digital education, and conducted its first research and advocacy efforts.

In 2015, she became a partner at Mercer, a global consulting firm, to evolve the 'When Women Thrive' research platform and lead efforts at the World Economic Forum in Davos.

=== TV shows / Radio ===
Openshaw has contributed as follows;

1998 - “Money Expert” for CBS-TV, Los Angeles

2000 - Financial columnist for MarketWatch

2002 - Appeared on Oprah

2005 - What's Your Net Worth? (Perseus), (from the book which she wrote)

2006 - Named AOL's Family Financial Editor

2007 - The Millionaire Zone (Hyperion)

2005 - Host of ABC Radio's “Winning Advice with Jennifer Openshaw”

Finance expert on CNBC, CNN, Bloomberg, ABC, CBS, NBC, Good Morning America, Nightly News, Today Show, CBS Early Show

=== Author ===
2001 - What's Your Net Worth?(Perseus)

2004 - The Free Quick & Easy Budget Kit—endorsed by Dr. Phil.

2007 - The Millionaire Zone: 7 Winning Steps to a Seven-Figure Fortune

2014 - The Socially Savvy Advisor: Compliant Social Media for the Financial Industry (Wiley)

=== Professor at NYU ===
Taught personal finance at the graduate school of engineering.

== Active Entrepreneur & Educator in female education ==
=== Women's Financial Network ===
In 1999, she started “Women's Financial Network”, developing business plans, raised capital and managed 30 for nation's first online financial services firm for women.

=== Microsoft Money as advisor ===
She served as "Realize Your Potential" spokesperson, educating women across the country.

=== Financial Women's Association ===
She was named the executive director of the Financial Women's Association.

=== SuperFutures ===
In 2009, developed online career readiness program to help high school students, including those at LA Alliance of Public Ready Schools.

=== Girls With Impact ===
In 2016, Openshaw founded this organization to help “equip all young women with the skills, tools, and network to succeed in business.”

== Personal ==
She is married to Durant (“Randy”) Schwimmer. They met in a pastry shop in Florence, Italy. They have two children: Elizabeth and Gianna.
