= Ken Stern =

American businessman and author

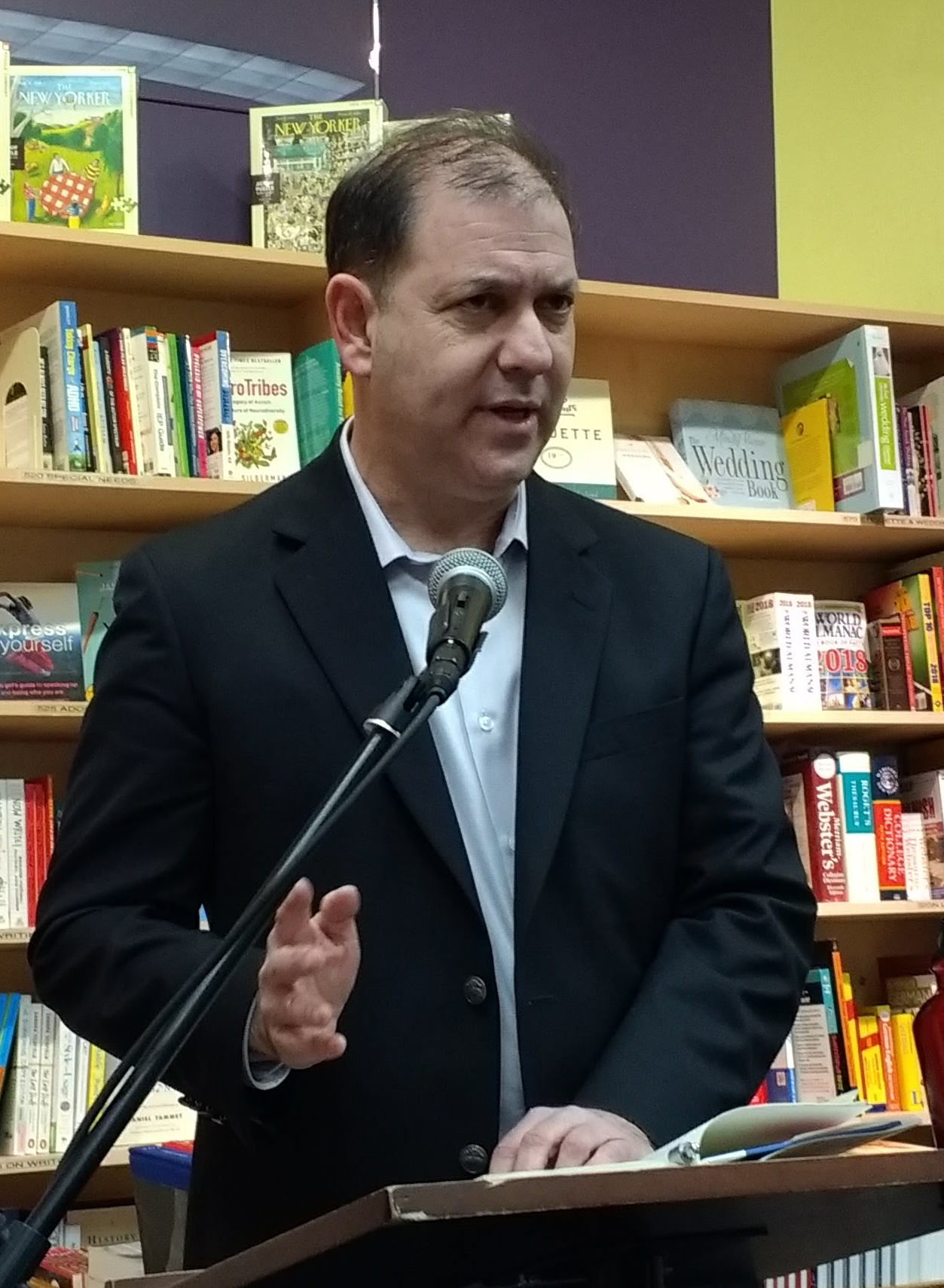
- Stern at a book reading in Cambridge, Massachusetts.
- Education: Haverford College; Yale Law School
- Occupations: Businessman; Author; Former CEO of National Public Radio Political Party: Republican (2017-present) Democrat (before 2017)
- Spouse(s): Beth Cooper (1 child, Nate)

Ken Stern is President of Palisades Media Ventures and the author of With Charity for All and Republican Like Me: How I Left the Liberal Bubble and Learned to Love the Right. He is a former chief executive officer of National Public Radio.

== Early life and education ==
A native of Washington, D.C., Stern grew up in South Korea and Germany where his father served in the United States Department of State. He graduated Phi Beta Kappa from Haverford College with a B.A. in political science. He also holds a J.D. from Yale Law School.

== Career ==
Prior to entering broadcasting, Stern was an attorney specializing in litigation with Wilmer Cutler and Pickering (now WilmerHale) in Washington. He also served as chief counsel for the 53rd Presidential Inaugural Committee and deputy general counsel for the Clinton/Gore 1996 Campaign.

From 1997 to 1999, Stern served as senior advisor to the director of the International Broadcasting Bureau in Washington, D.C., the umbrella organization overseeing American worldwide broadcasting operations including Radio Free Europe, Radio Liberty, Voice of America and Radio and TV Marti. He used to be legal and management consultant to Radio Free Europe and Radio Liberty, based in Munich and Prague.

=== National Public Radio ===
Stern served as NPR's executive vice president beginning in November 1999, and was named NPR CEO in September, 2007. During his 8 1/2-year tenure, NPR strengthened its business management and operations. NPR's financial stability further improved after the organization received the largest gift in NPR history, $200 million from McDonald's heiress and philanthropist, Joan Kroc. Stern's time as executive vice president also included the 2004 dismissal of Morning Edition founding host Bob Edwards in the months prior to Edwards's 25th anniversary as host of the show. Additionally, Stern oversaw the April 2006 launch of NPR Berlin, an FM channel in Germany that marked the organization's move into international broadcasting.

In 2007, the Wall Street Journal summarized NPR's competitive position soon after Stern became CEO: "In an era when commercial radio seems to be floundering, National Public Radio is hitting its stride. Some 25.5 million people tune into its programming each week, up from 13 million a decade ago. It has more than 800 member stations, up from 635 a decade ago. In some places, like Seattle, its Morning Edition is consistently the most popular morning drive show on any radio station. It is expanding foreign coverage, winning more underwriting dollars, and forging into the digital age with online streams and podcasts. Much of this growth has occurred under Ken Stern, NPR's chief executive, who joined as executive vice president in 1999." One of Stern's final acts as NPR CEO was his March 5, 2008 announcement with Washington, D.C. Mayor Adrian Fenty that NPR would develop a new headquarters to be built a few blocks away from NPR's current location. The next day, March 6, 2008, the NPR Board announced that Stern would be stepping down from his role as chief executive officer. NPR suggested that he was forced out due to clashes with local stations over NPR's increased streaming on digital platforms, which local stations claimed reduced their donations. Stern made $1,319,541 in 2008.

=== Writing ===
In 2013 Ken Stern's book With Charity for All: Why Charities are Failing and a Better Way to Give was published by Knopf Doubleday Publishing Group. His book discusses the problems in the not for profit charity sector, and appeals to donors for more evaluation and consideration in their decision making, in order to provide support for upcoming best of class charities, so that these organizations may survive and flourish in a sector controlled by large, traditional charities with less than optimal performance. He points out that although this sector accounts for a fast-growing ten percent of U.S. economic activity with over one trillion dollars in yearly donations, it has very little transparency, accountability, or oversight. He was interviewed with a focus on his book by Ken Berger, CEO of Charity Navigator. The interview was televised on C-SPAN's BookTV series Afterwords in March, 2013. Ken also wrote the book Republican Like Me: How I Left the Liberal Bubble and Learned to Love the Right. In the book he chronicles his journey interviewing conservatives from all backgrounds and ends up becoming an independent voter.
