= Oludamini Ogunnaike =

Religious studies academic

- Born: 1985 (Note: See VIAF and "National: United States" files in "Authority control databases")
- Occupation: Associate professor of religious studies
- Employer: University of Virginia
- Awards: Rockefeller Fellowship; Gordon W. Allport Prize, 2006-2007

Academic background
- Education: Harvard University
- Thesis: The language of prejudice: The influence of language on implicit attitudes (2006-2007)

Academic work
- Discipline: African studies; Study of religion
- Website: https://virginia.academia.edu/OludaminiOgunnaike

Oludamini Ogunnaike (born 1985) is an associate professor of religious studies at the University of Virginia. He immigrated to the United States from Nigeria with his family when he was four.

== Education ==
He holds a Ph.D. and M.Phil. in African studies and the study of religion from Harvard University, along with an A.B. in cognitive neuroscience and African studies from Harvard College. He was a member of Phi Beta Kappa and received a Rockefeller Fellowship while an undergraduate student at Harvard. He also won a Gordon W. Allport Prize for his senior thesis, "The language of prejudice: The influence of language on implicit attitudes" in 2006-2007. He continued to study language and how it can affect perception and prejudice.

== Select publications ==
=== Books ===
- Poetry in Praise of Prophetic Perfection: West African Madīḥ Poetry and its Precedents (2020)
- Deep Knowledge: Ways of Knowing in Sufism and Ifa, Two West African Intellectual Traditions (2020)
