= Christine Iverson Bennett =

Danish-born American missionary (1881–1916)

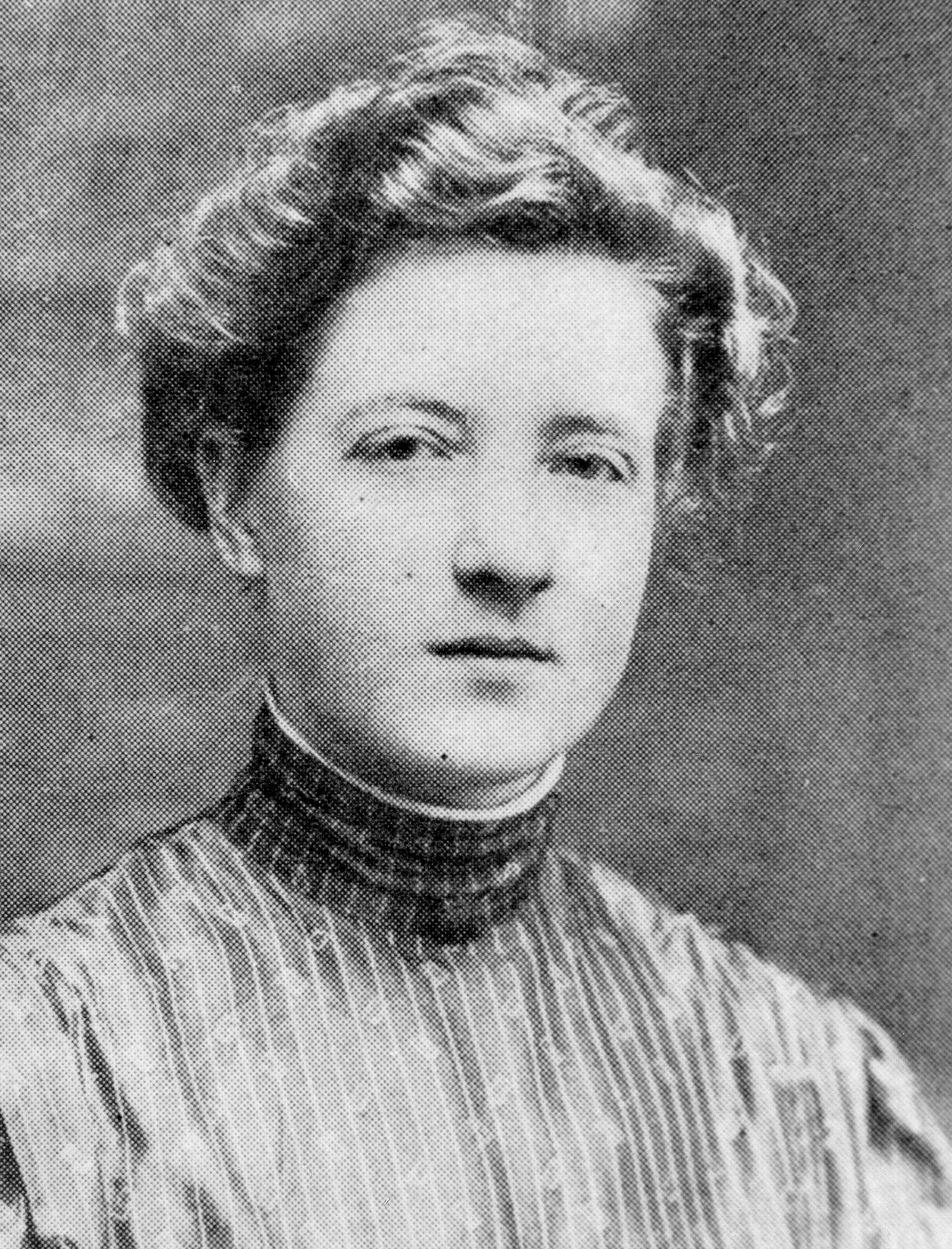
- Born: Anna Christine Iverson; January 4, 1881; Denmark
- Died: March 29, 1916 (aged 35); Busrah
- Education: University of Michigan Medical School
- Occupations: Physician, medical missionary

Christine Iverson Bennett, born Anna Christine Iverson, (1881–1916) was a Danish emigrant to the United States (1893) and member of the Arabian Mission. Iverson graduated from the University of Michigan with her Medical Doctorate degree. After a few years of medical work, she became a medical missionary of the Arabian Mission, and moved to Bahrein in 1909, to work at Mason Memorial Hospital. Marrying Dr. Arthur King Bennett in 1911, they relocated to Busrah, Arabia where the couple continued missionary work at the Lansing Memorial Hospital. She was known for her impact on treating large numbers of patients, both at the Lansing Hospital and in the surrounding area. Additionally, when World War I limited her travel, Iverson began using the hospital specifically to treat wounded soldiers. In 1916, an outbreak of typhoid fever occurred and, while treating infected individuals, she contracted typhoid fever, resulting in her death at age 35 in 1916.

== Early life ==
Anna Christine Iverson was born on January 4, 1881, in Denmark. In 1893, at the age of 12, she immigrated to the United States with her family, settling in South Dakota near a Sioux Indian Reservation. While in primary school, Iverson wrote of herself reading The Post of Honor. According to self-proclamation, the story about missionary life in Madagascar portrayed in the book motivated her to pursue missionary work.

== Education ==
Iverson attended primary school in Chamberlain, South Dakota. Due to familial relocation to a town near Yankton, South Dakota, she received her high school education at Yankton. Following the completion of high school, she enrolled at Yankton College for one year before dedicating two years to teaching in efforts to raise funds for medical school. In 1907, Iverson received her Medical Doctorate from the Department of Medicine and Surgery at the University of Michigan, where she was Assistant Demonstrator of Anatomy and Secretary of the Medical School class of 1907.

== Personal life ==
After setting out to Bahrein, to work at the Mason Memorial Hospital with the intention of providing care to women, Dr. Iverson connected with Arthur King Bennett, an individual she knew from the University of Michigan. On September 25, 1911, Iverson married him in Simla, Bengal, India. The two then moved to Busrah, Arabia to pursue medical missionary work. On July 9, 1912, while in Busrah, she gave birth to her only son, Matthew Cole Bennett.

== Career ==
=== Pre-Missionary Work ===
While still attending medical school at the University of Michigan, Iverson worked as a nurse simultaneously to raise money for her education at various medical facilities in Ann Arbor. She excelled in pathology and was sworn into Phi Beta Kappa. Upon graduation, Iverson worked at the Michigan Asylum for the Insane as both an attendant and medical intern. She received a $16.00 monthly salary and oversaw most laboratory work with the help of her future successor, Dr. Maud M Rees. After two years, Iverson applied for missionary work through the Arabian Mission, resulting in her departure from the asylum on September 1, 1909.

=== The Arabian Mission ===
After her marriage to Arthur King Bennett in 1911, Iverson and her husband went to Busrah, Arabia to conduct missionary work at the Lansing Memorial Hospital. While at Lansing, Iverson focused primarily on the medical treatment of women, however, she did not hesitate to collaborate with her husband on difficult cases. Despite primarily treating adult female patients, she also dedicated some of her time towards conducting bacteriological work. With her husband she took on collective tasks including the vaccination of all willing individuals against the bubonic plague and the creation of a community for leper patients, consisting of huts that were erected around the hospital for patients to live in as they received treatment. The various aspects of Lansing Memorial Hospital, combined with the success of both doctors, resulted in the hospital becoming self-sufficient while simultaneously being the only hospital within a 300-mile radius. Due to the isolated nature of the hospital Iverson would often use her afternoons to conduct home visits but stopped doing so at the beginning of World War I.

=== Wartime Missionary ===
In November 1914, Turkey began its engagement in World War I. As Turkish involvement in the war began, Iverson and her husband treated wounded soldiers at the Lansing Memorial Hospital under supervision of the Turkish Red Crescent. Due to the influx of patients, only serious cases received treatment at the hospital, all other patients were sent to various churches and school buildings among the missions. On 21, 1914, the British arrived in Busrah. Iverson and her husband, again, provided care for the wounded soldiers. As the war progressed, the hospital maintained elevated numbers of patients to the point where British forces supplied additional hospital staff and doctors and Iverson worked under the auspices of the Red Cross and the British treating war-related injuries until 1916.

== Death ==
In 1916, a group of Turkish soldiers, sick with malaria, were sent from a prisoner's camp to the hospital where Dr. Christine Iverson Bennett had worked. Illness, in the form of a fever, quickly spread from the Turkish soldiers to members of the hospital staff. Iverson's husband soon fell sick and was relocated to the central military hospital for treatment. While treating the sick and wounded, Iverson contracted typhoid fever. She died in the central military hospital on March 29, 1916, at age 35, after completing four years of service at Busrah. Her funeral service took place a few miles from Busrah at a European cemetery at Marghill. Mr. Van Ess, an individual from the mission, conducted Dr. Christine Iverson Bennett's funeral service and many important individuals, including the military governors of Busrah and Ashar and Sir Percy Cox, were in attendance.
