= MoneyTrack =

Concept and television show about personal finance and investing

MoneyTrack is a concept and television-show about personal finance and investing, first introduced by Pam Krueger.

A show on this concept, also called MoneyTrack, runs as a weekly half-hour public television series airing on PBS stations. It was created, produced and co-hosted by Pam Krueger and Jack Gallagher, and launched in 2005 with 13 episodes. MoneyTrack claims that the fourth season will be screened in the fall of 2012.

In 2005, a guest on the MoneyTrack show, Rob Black, wrote Getting On The MoneyTrack; and in October this book was published. Pam Krueger wrote the foreword. In October 2008, Krueger wrote the companion book to the show, The MoneyTrack Method: A Step-by-Step Guide to Investing Like the Pros. Wiley published both.

MoneyTrack is produced at Beyond Pix Studios in San Francisco. MoneyTrack is underwritten by the Investor Protection Trust with support from state securities regulators.

Topics discussed on the program include: investing, economics, and personal finance topics such as credit, debt, real estate, and taxes. They advertise, "Every week, co-hosts Pam Krueger and Jack Gallagher talk with real people who are living examples of what works and what doesn’t when it comes to managing (and maximizing) your wealth. Combined with sage advice from top financial experts, such as Warren Buffett, John Bogle and well-known commentator Ben Stein".

Video segments of MoneyTrack are on MSN Money

== Awards ==
Co-Host Pam Krueger won a 2009 Gracie Award for Individual Achievement for Outstanding Producer of an Entertainment Series on Public Television.

The MoneyTrack series picked up two Telly Awards, and two Communicator Awards for Season Two.

== Plagiarism accusations ==
On 18 May 2012, Katrina Trinko at the conservative website National Review Online noticed that Black's part of the first book Getting on the MoneyTrack shares text with Senatorial candidate Elizabeth Warren's book, All Your Worth. At the time, Trinko was comparing Warren's paperback with Black's original, but the post was taken down and a correction posted when Trinko learned that she was comparing the publication date of Warren's paperback edition and that the hardcover date preceded Black's book.
