= List of programs broadcast by Kentucky Educational Television =

The following is a list of programs broadcast by Kentucky Educational Television (KET), a PBS-affiliated statewide network based in Lexington, Kentucky, which serves the entire state of Kentucky and portions of neighboring states.

== Local programming ==
=== Current ===
- Bluegrass and Backroads – produced by Kentucky Farm Bureau
- bookclub at KET
- Comment on Kentucky (1974–present)
- Connections with Renee Shaw (2005–present)
- GED Connection (2002–present)
- Great Conversations – interviews with famous authors
- Health Three60
- Inside Louisville (2023–present)
- Jubilee (1990?–present) – featuring music performances of local bluegrass and country bands around Kentucky.
- Kentucky Afield (1985–present)
- Kentucky Collectables (2012–present)
- Kentucky Edition (2022–present) – statewide news program
- Kentucky Health (2015–present) – focusing on health issues in Kentucky.
- Kentucky Life (1995–present)
- Kentucky Muse (2008–present) – focuses on culture in Kentucky
- Kentucky Time Capsule – Kentucky history.
- Kentucky Tonight (1994–present)
- Louisville Life (2006–present)
- News Quiz (1985–present) – a KET-produced newscast for students in Grades 3–6. Features national news headlines, and a quiz for the students to take when the program is viewed in the schools.
- One to One with Bill Goodman (2006–present)
- Pre-GED Connection
- Tim Farmer's Country Kitchen – Hosted and produced by former "Kentucky Afield" host Tim Farmer and his wife Nikki.
- U of L Today with Mark Hebert – news magazine program devoted to the University of Louisville
- Video Vault – showcasing some public domain content such as old films and select episodes of old shows.
- Video Vault: Kentucky Edition – showcasing some public domain content involving some Kentuckians with ties to the film industry.
- Wildcat Insights – magazine program devoted to the University of Kentucky
- Woodsongs – visual version of the radio program of the same name, featuring Kentucky's Bluegrass music talents.

=== Former ===
==== Series ====
- Captioned Kentucky News (1984–1998?) – captioned/subtitled versions of local 6 p.m. and/or 7 p.m. newscasts by various television stations in Lexington and Louisville.
- Bywords (1980–1985, reruns available on KY Channel and on KET.org)
- Distinguished Kentuckian (1974–1992, reruns available on KY Channel and on KET.org) – interviews with people with notable accomplishments in Kentucky
- East of Ninaveh (1986–87)
- Education Notebook (1987)
- From the Ground Up (1991–92, reruns available on KY channel and on KET.org) – show about architecture in Kentucky
- GED – Get it! (1993–199?)
- GED on TV (1975–1976?, 1986–1987)
- Kentucky Author Forum Presents
- Kentucky Considered
- Kentucky Journal (1980–198?)
- Kentucky Magazine
- Kentucky Now (1978–1979?)
- KET Scholastic Challenge (1982–1988) – quiz bowl-style program
- Legislative Update (1978–2004) – replaced with live legislative coverage on KET5 and KET6 (2004–07), and then the Kentucky Channel since 2008
- The Lonesome Pine Specials (1986–1992)
- McClain County Festival (1974)
- The People's Business
- A Reflection of Kentucky (1972)
- Run That By Me Again (1977–1981, reruns available on Kentucky channel) – interviews with former Kentucky athletes involved with the biggest events involving Kentucky's college football and basketball programs.
- Signature (1990s) – nationally distributed

==== Locally-produced instructional series ====
- Adult Math (1985, part of the KET/GED library)
- Another Page (1981, 1988; reruns continued through 2004)
- The Business of Writing
- Dealing in Discipline
- Imagine That
- Kentucky GeoQuest (1993, occasional reruns continued on KET Star Channel 703, KET3 and KET-ED through 2009)
- Learn to Read (1987, reruns continued through 2005, produced in association with WXYZ-TV/Detroit, Michigan)
- Math Basics (1992–93, reruns continued through 2012)
- Math Country (1978)
- Old Music for New Ears (1992–1993)
- Signature (1994–1998) – nationally broadcast by PBS
- Street Smarts (1998)
- The Universe and I (1976–198?, KET's first nationally and internationally distributed ITV series)
- Workplace Essentials Skills (1999–200?)
- Write Right (1985, produced by Mississippi ETV Network, but distributed by KET as part of KET/GED library)

== Notable documentaries by KET ==
- Along Kentucky 80 (1992) – John Ed Pearce's cross-state driving journey along Kentucky Route 80
- From This Valley (1989)
- The Hills Resound: The Music of Kentucky (1970)
- Kentucky Is My Land (1969) – KET's first ever instructional television documentary
- Kentucky Seasons (2020)
- The KET Story (September 23, 2018) – KET's 50th Anniversary program highlighting the network's history
- Louisville Symphony in Moscow (1990) – concert film of the Louisville Symphony's performance abroad
- Mountain Born: The Jean Ritchie Story (1996)
- On The Ohio (1987) – John Ed Pearce's journey along the Ohio River from Ashland to Wickliffe
- Our Kentucky (February 28, 2009) – a high-definition broadcast profiling Kentucky's landscape
- Time on the River (1987)
- Wilderness Road (1991)

== Political programming ==
In 1975, KET broadcast its first gubernatorial debate. Then in 1979, the network broadcast is first gubernatorial election night coverage, and has covered every single one ever since.

== Sports programming ==
During the 1981–82 season, KET was a part-time affiliate of the short-lived OVC Network, broadcasting select games of Ohio Valley Conference men's basketball.

== See also ==
- Kentucky Educational Television
- American Public Television
- List of programs broadcast by PBS
  - List of programs broadcast by PBS Kids
