= History of agrarianism =

Agrarianism is social philosophy or political philosophy which values rural society as superior to urban society, the independent farmer as superior to the paid worker, and sees farming as a way of life that can shape the ideal social values. It stresses the superiority of a simpler rural life as opposed to the complexity of city life.

== Classical era ==
=== Greece and Rome ===
In Greece, Hesiod, Aristotle, and Xenophon promoted agrarian ideas. Even more influential were such Roman thinkers as Cato, Cicero, Horace, and Virgil. They all praised the virtues of a life devoted to the tilling of the soil.

=== China ===
Agriculturalism (農家/农家; Nongjia) was an early agrarian social and political philosophy in ancient China that advocated peasant utopian communalism and egalitarianism. The philosophy is founded on the notion that human society originates with the development of agriculture, and societies are based upon "people's natural propensity to farm."

The Agriculturalists believed that the ideal government, modeled after the semi-mythical governance of Shennong, is led by a benevolent king, one who works alongside the people in tilling the fields. The Agriculturalist king is not paid by the government through its treasuries; his livelihood is derived from the profits he earns working in the fields, not his leadership. Unlike the Confucians, the Agriculturalists did not believe in the division of labour, arguing instead that the economic policies of a country need to be based upon an egalitarian self sufficiency. The Agriculturalists supported the fixing of prices, in which all similar goods, regardless of differences in quality and demand, are set at exactly the same, unchanging price.

They encouraged farming and agriculture and taught farming and cultivation techniques, as they believed that agricultural development was the key to a stable and prosperous society. The philosopher Mencius once criticised its chief proponent Xu Xing (許行) for advocating that rulers should work in the fields with their subjects. One of Xu's students is quoted as having criticized the duke of Teng in a conversation with Mencius by saying: ‘A worthy ruler feeds himself by ploughing side by side with the people, and rules while cooking his own meals. Now Teng on the contrary possesses granaries and treasuries, so the ruler is supporting himself by oppressing the people’.

== 18th and 19th centuries ==
=== Physiocrats ===
Physiocracy was a French agrarian philosophy that originated in the 18th century. The movement was particularly dominated by François Quesnay (1694–1774) and Anne-Robert-Jacques Turgot (1727–1781). The Physiocrats were partially influenced by Chinese agrarianism; leading physiocrats like François Quesnay were avid Confucianists that advocated China's agrarian policies.

=== 18th- and 19th-century Europeans and Americans ===
Borrowing from the French Physiocrats the idea that all wealth originates with the land, making farming the only truly productive enterprise, agrarianism claims that agriculture is the foundation of all other professions. Philosophically, European agrarianism reflects the ideas of John Locke, who declared in his Second Treatise of Civil Government (1690) that those who work the land are its rightful owners. His labor theory of value influenced the thinking of Thomas Jefferson, who in turn shaped the way many 19th-century American homesteaders understood ownership of their farms. Jefferson wrote in 1785 in a letter to John Jay that

Cultivators of the earth are the most valuable citizens. They are the most vigorous, the most independent, the most virtuous, & they are tied to their country & wedded to its liberty & interests by the most lasting bonds.".

The political philosopher James Harrington influenced the development of explicit agrarian designs for the colonies of Carolina, Pennsylvania, and Georgia. James Edward Oglethorpe, who founded Georgia in 1733, implemented a comprehensive physical, social, and economic development plan organised around the central concept of "agrarian equality." The Oglethorpe Plan allocated land in grants of equal size, prohibited acquisition of additional land through marriage or acquisition, and prohibited slavery for moral reasons as well as to prevent the formation of large plantations like those that existed in neighbouring South Carolina.

Richard Hofstadter has traced the sentimental attachment to the rural way of life, which he describes as "a kind of homage that Americans have paid to the fancied innocence of their origins." Hofstadter notes that to call this a "myth" is not to imply that the idea is simply false. Rather the myth so effectively informs an agrarian ethos that it profoundly influences people's ways of perceiving values and hence their behaviour. He emphasises the importance of the agrarian myth in American politics and life even after industrialisation revolutionised the American economy and life. He stresses the significance of the writings of Jefferson and his followers in the South, such as John Taylor of Caroline in the development of agricultural fundamentalism.

American politicians, for example, boasted of their agrarian or log-cabin origins, and praised the republicanism of the yeoman farmers.

In the late 18th and early 19th century, agrarianism felt the influence of the European Romanticism movement. Romantics focused attention on the individual and described nature as a spiritual force. At a time when pristine wilderness was becoming scarce in many parts of Europe, what constitutes “nature” was confused with the last remnants of wilderness—cultivated fields, managed woodlands, and cultivated livestock and crops. As someone in constant contact with (this watered-down version of) “nature”, the farmer was positioned to experience moments that transcend the mundane material world. In doing so, these thinkers managed to redefine nature in the human image, accommodating enclosure with a new “domesticated” version of nature.

=== Ireland Agrarian Rebellions ===
In Ireland, many agrarian rebellions occurred during the 18th and the 19th century because of the discontented rural landless Catholics. The first outbreaks occurred in 1711 to 1713, when a group called the ‘Houghers’ slaughtered many sheep and cattle owned by landlords. This event became widespread and affected many other western counties in Ireland. However, the actions taken by the ‘Houghers’ didn't produce any successors and did not create a tradition for peasant revolt. It took almost 50 years to see another agrarian rebellion in Ireland. This time the Whiteboy movement led the outbreak between 1761 and 1765. This particular outbreak created a tradition of peasant protest throughout the provinces of Munster and Leinster. The first operations of the Whiteboys succeeded but did not have a long-lasting effect. The Whiteboys caused a second outbreak between 1769 and 1776. The outbreak started slowly but intensified quickly. At the same time, the Hearts of Steel and the Steelboys, who were also agrarian movements, led outbreaks in other parts of Ireland. The main goals of the Whiteboy movement were to short-circuit the judicial system, lower the price of the rents and the reduction of the tithe on potatoes and corn.

In the late 18th century and early 19th century, the competition for potato land was extremely high in Ireland. This competition over land led to a lot of agrarian violence.

In the 1820s, a new agrarian movement was created in Ireland called the Rockites. This newly formed movement was one of the most violent agrarian movements that Ireland has ever seen in its history. They would commit murder and use incendiary weapons in warfare. Most of their support came from the poor population. The actions taken by the Rockites led to the reinforcement of military presence in Ireland. Many observers believe that the creation of the Rockite movement occurred because of a single man called Alexander Hoskins. Alexander Hoskins owned over 34,000 acres of land around the small town of Newcastle West. People complained that he managed the land poorly and with irregularity. During 1821–22, Ireland went into an agricultural crisis, which led to an economic disaster that largely affected the rural population. However, the main reason why the Rockites took violent action in Ireland was to fight against those who owned economic survival. The competition for land at that time was very intense and the Rockites showed that the poor population would do anything to obtain some.

== 20th century ==
In the 1910s and 1920s, agrarianism garnered significant popular attention, but was eclipsed after 1945 as Agrarian movements were suppressed behind the Iron Curtain. It revived somewhat in conjunction with the environmental movement, and has been drawing an increasing number of adherents.

=== Central and Eastern Europe ===
Eastern European theorists include Pyotr Stolypin (1862–1911) and Alexander Chayanov (1888–1939) in Russia; Adolph Wagner (1835–1917), and Karl Oldenberg in Germany, and Bolesław Limanowski (1835–1935) in Poland.

In Russia the intellectuals of the "Populists" (Narodnaya Volya) and, later, the Socialist-Revolutionary Party developed a theoretical basis for a peasant movement, building a rich, well-developed humanistic ideology which influenced eastern Europe, especially the Balkans. It never attained the international visibility among peasants that socialism did among the urban workers.

In Poland Bolesław Limanowski thought deeply about Agrarianism and worked out an eclectic program that fit Polish conditions. His practical experience as a farm manager combined with socialist, "single-tax," and Slavic communal ideas shaped his world view. He proposed a form of agrarian socialism with large state farms to counteract the inefficiency of very small holdings. In independent Poland he advocated expropriation of gentry estates. His observation of peasant individualism convinced him that Poland should combine voluntary collectivism and individual possession of the leased land. His pragmatism left room even for private peasant ownership, despite his Marxism.

=== Canada ===
The most important Canadian theorist was an American immigrant, Henry Wise Wood, president of the United Farmers of Alberta (UFA) during that movement's time as the governing party of the province (1921–1935). He, as did many Canadian farmers of the era, conceived of farmers as a distinct social class in the midst of a class struggle against capitalists who owned the Canada's banks, railways, and grain trading companies. His solution was a kind of corporatism called "group government". In this scheme, people would be represented in government by a party or organization that defended the interests of their particular occupation or industry, not a particular ideology. On the basis of this philosophy the UFA, as the representative of the farmers as a class, ran candidates only in rural area and not in the cities. Instead they urged their urban sympathisers to vote for Labour candidates, as the representatives of the urban working class. This type of farmer-labour co-operation became common throughout Western Canada, leading to the creation of the short-lived Progressive Party of Canada in the 1920s, and the more durable Co-operative Commonwealth Federation (Farmer-Labour-Socialist) in Calgary, Alberta, in 1935, precursor to Canada's modern-day social democratic party, the New Democratic Party. Demeritt (1995) argues that in British Columbia (and Canada generally), there were three overlapping agrarian viewpoints. Arcadianism was based on nostalgic memories of rural England, and led to the widespread creation of orchards and gardens. Agrarianism claimed agriculture was the source of all wealth and called for the wide distribution of land as the foundation of democracy and freedom. The Country Life Movement was a loose grouping of social reformers, church leaders, and urban progressives; they sought solutions for rural economic decline, social stagnation, and the depopulation of the countryside.

=== United States ===
In American history important spokesmen included Benjamin Franklin, Thomas Jefferson, J. Hector St. John de Crèvecœur (1735–1813), and John Taylor of Caroline (1753–1824) in the early national period. The memory of George Washington was often upheld as an ideal agrarian. In the mid-19th century important leaders included Transcendentalists such as Ralph Waldo Emerson (1803–1882) and Henry David Thoreau (1817–1862). After 1890 came philosopher Josiah Royce (1855–1916), botanist Liberty Hyde Bailey (1858–1954), the Southern Agrarians of the 1920s and 1930s, novelist John Steinbeck (1902–1968), historian A. Whitney Griswold (1906–1963), environmentalist Aldo Leopold (1887–1948), Ralph Borsodi (1886–1977), and present-day authors Wendell Berry (b. 1934), Gene Logsdon (b. 1932), Paul Thompson, and Allan C. Carlson (b. 1949).

In 1930 in the U.S. the Southern Agrarians wrote in the "Introduction: A Statement of Principles" to their book I'll Take My Stand: The South and the Agrarian Tradition that

All the articles bear in the same sense upon the book's title-subject: all tend to support a Southern way of life against what may be called the American or prevailing way; and all as much as agree that the best terms in which to represent the distinction are contained in the phrase, Agrarian versus Industrial. ... Opposed to the industrial society is the agrarian, which does not stand in particular need of definition. An agrarian society is hardly one that has no use at all for industries, for professional vocations, for scholars and artists, and for the life of cities. Technically, perhaps, an agrarian society is one in which agriculture is the leading vocation, whether for wealth, for pleasure, or for prestige-a form of labor that is pursued with intelligence and leisure, and that becomes the model to which the other forms approach as well as they may. But an agrarian regime will be secured readily enough where the superfluous industries are not allowed to rise against it. The theory of agrarianism is that the culture of the soil is the best and most sensitive of vocations, and that therefore it should have the economic preference and enlist the maximum number of workers.

==== Leading American neo-agrarian theorists ====
Recent agrarian thinkers are sometimes referred to as neo-Agrarian and include the likes of Wendell Berry, Paul B. Thompson, and Gene Logsdon. They are characterised by seeing the world through an agricultural lens. Although much of Inge's principles, above, still apply to the French Revolution, the affiliation with a particular religion and patriarchal tendency have subsided to some degree.

Leopold was born in 1887 and educated at Yale University. He developed the field of game management and introduced an ecological ethic that replaced an earlier wilderness ethic where human dominance is stressed. In addition, he included the farm as a place of conservation and is considered an agrarian scholar. Leopold believed that harm was frequently done to natural systems out of a sense of ownership and this idea eclipsed community.[18] He expanded the idea of community to include the environment and the farm. Leopold is the author of several essays and is perhaps best known for his book A Sand County Almanac (1953).

Berry is an author of several books, essays, and poems whose writing often illustrates his values which centre around sustainable agriculture, healthy rural communities, and a connection to place. He is a prominent defender of agrarian values and has an appreciation for traditional farming. Rod Dreher writes the following: “[Berry's] unshakable devotion to the land, to localism, and to the dignity of traditional life makes him both a great American and, to the disgrace of our age, a prophet without honour in his native land."[29]

Callicott is best known for his research which explores an Aldo Leopold ethic as a response to global climate change. Callicott supports a holistic, non-anthropocentric environmental ethic which is in accordance with Leopold's view that "A thing is right when it tends to preserve the integrity, stability, and beauty of the biotic community. It is wrong when it tends otherwise"[15] He holds the view that an adequate environmental ethic—one that addresses actual environmental concerns—must be intrinsically holistic.

Thompson is the W.K. Kellogg Chair in Agricultural Food and Community Ethics at Michigan State University. He has published extensively on the social and environmental significance of agriculture and a number of volumes and papers on the philosophical significance of farming, notably The Spirit of the Soil: Agriculture and Environmental Ethics (1995) and The Agrarian Roots of Pragmatism (2000). His most recent publication called The Agrarian Vision focuses on sustainability and what agrarian philosophy can offer when we conceptualise what sustainability actually means.
