= Jane Vandenburgh =

American novelist (born 1948)

- Born: 1948 (age 77–78); Berkeley, California, U.S.
- Education: California State University Long Beach (BA); San Francisco State University (MA)
- Occupations: Novelist, memoirist
- Spouse: Jack Shoemaker

Jane Vandenburgh (born 1948) is an American novelist and memoirist.

== Biography ==
Jane Vandenburgh was born in Berkeley, California and grew up in Redondo Beach and in the San Fernando Valley. She is a fifth-generation Californian.

She holds a bachelor's degree in English literature from California State University Long Beach (1971) and a master's degree (1978) in English literature with a specialization in creative writing from San Francisco State University. The title story of her master's thesis, The Salisbury Court Reporter, won the Katherine Anne Porter Prize for fiction in 1981. Her publisher is Counterpoint Press.

Vandenburgh is the author of two novels, Failure to Zig-Zag (Farrar, Straus and Giroux 1989), The Physics of Sunset (Pantheon 1999), and two books of memoir, A Pocket History of Sex in the Twentieth Century (Counterpoint 2009), and The Wrong Dog Dream: A True Romance (Counterpoint, 2013), which is an intense parallel narrative of dog ownership and a new marriage while living in Washington, D.C.

Vandenburgh's book on the craft of fiction, The Architecture of the Novel: A Writer's Handbook (Counterpoint 2010) is a philosophical exploration of the structural elements of long-form fiction, with an introduction by writer Anne Lamott. Once a recipient of the Mildred Sherrod Bissinger Memorial Endowed Fellowship, Vandenburgh now teaches a yearlong course in the book length narrative through the Djerassi Artists Residency program in Woodside, California, as well as an annual workshop at Fishtrap: Writing and the West in Oregon. Vandenburgh has taught in graduate programs of literature and creative writing at University of California, Davis, Georgetown and the George Washington universities in Washington, DC, and served as Distinguished Writer in Residence at St. Mary's College, in Moraga, California. Since the late 1970s Vandenburgh has worked as a developmental editor for such publishers as San Francisco-based Chronicle Books, Counterpoint Press and for the Book Club of California.

A regular columnist for The Huffington Post, Vandenburgh published there an open letter to Robert B. Silvers, long-time editor of the New York Review of Books, describing the long tradition of strong support that she and other literary women have shown that publication, but questioning the preponderance of males in its reviewer roster and its review subjects.

Vandenburgh is the mother of two children from a previous marriage. She is married to Jack Shoemaker, Editorial Director and Vice-President at Counterpoint Press in a Berkeley, California, longtime publisher of Gary Snyder and Wendell Berry, among many other writers. They live in Point Richmond, California. In 1999, Vandenburgh was the Washington, D.C. coordinator of the Million Mom March, a public demonstration to raise public awareness about the need for stricter gun control in the U.S.
