= The Unsettling of America =

1977 book by Wendell Berry

The Unsettling of America: Culture & Agriculture
- Cover of 2015 Reprinting by Counterpoint
- Author: Wendell Berry
- Language: English
- Subject: Agriculture, agrarianism, environmentalism
- Genre: Non-fiction
- Publisher: Sierra Club Books
- Publication date: 1977
- Publication place: United States
- Media type: Print
- Pages: 228
- ISBN: 0-87156-877-2

The Unsettling of America: Culture & Agriculture is a 1977 work of non-fiction by American essayist, poet, and farmer Wendell Berry. In the book, Berry offers a critique of modern industrial agriculture in the United States, arguing that it leads to the degradation of the land, the breakdown of rural communities, and a loss of cultural and spiritual connection to place. The book has been widely recognized as a seminal text in agrarian thought and environmental ethics.

== Background ==
Wendell Berry, a Kentucky farmer and writer, had been publishing essays, fiction, and poetry related to agriculture and the environment since the 1960s. By the mid-1970s, he emerged as a leading critic of the U.S. agricultural system. The Unsettling of America developed out of Berry's ongoing concerns about the ecological and cultural consequences of the industrialization of farming, and it reflected his broader agrarian philosophy that emphasized local economies, stewardship of the land, and the moral responsibilities of farmers.

== Synopsis ==
Berry argues that the shift from small-scale, diversified family farming to large-scale, mechanized, and chemically dependent agribusiness has profound negative consequences. According to Berry, industrial agriculture prioritizes efficiency and profit over ecological health and community well-being. He maintains that this results in environmental degradation, a decline of family farms and rural communities, a commodification of both land and people, and a broader cultural alienation from the land and its care. Berry contrasts this with an agrarian ideal grounded in respect for limits, commitment to place, and recognition of the interdependence between humans and the natural world.

As he summarizes in an afterword added to the third edition of the book published in 1996, the book argues that "industrial agriculture and the assumptions on which it rests are wrong, root and branch; I argue that this kind of agriculture grows out of the worst of human history and the worst of human nature." He goes on to describe that the book was written "out of the belief that we were living under the rule of an ideology that was destroying our land, our communities, and our culture-as we still are."

== Reception and legacy ==
Upon publication, The Unsettling of America was noted for its forceful prose and moral urgency. It was influential among environmentalists, theologians, and scholars of agrarian studies. Writing in the New York Times, Donald Hall wrote that in the publication of this work, Berry "is a prophet of our healing, a utopian poet‐legislator like William Blake". Reviewing the book in the Birmingham News, Russell Kirk favorably compared Berry to the ancient Roman poet Virgil and praised Berry's writing style as well as the argument itself, writing that "Berry is possessed of an intellect at once philosophic and poetic, and he writes most movingly. Humane culture has no better friend today than he."

The book has come to be regarded as a classic, and has been described as one of Berry's most important works and a cornerstone in the literature of American agrarianism. Berry's arguments influenced subsequent generations of writers and activists, including proponents of the local food movement and advocates for regenerative agriculture.

== Publication history ==
The Unsettling of America: Culture & Agriculture has been reissued multiple times since its original publication, reflecting its ongoing influence. The following table summarizes notable editions:

Year	Publisher	Format	Pages	ISBN	Notes
1977	Sierra Club Books	Hardcover	228	0-87156-877-2	First edition
1978	Avon Books	Paperback	228	0-380-50922-4	Mass market paperback
1984	Avon Books	Paperback	228	0-380-40147-2	Reprint edition
1986	Sierra Club Books	Paperback	228	0-87156-772-5	Trade paperback
2004	Counterpoint	Paperback	246	0-87156-877-2	Revised edition with new preface
2015	Counterpoint	Paperback	254	978-1-61902-599-8	Modern reprint
2020	Recorded Books	Audiobook	—	—	Narrated by Nick Offerman
2026	Counterpoint	Paperback	336	9781640098374	50th Anniversary Edition

Sections of the book have also been included in several collections of Berry's writings, such as "The Art of the Commonplace" and "The World-Ending Fire".

== See also ==
- Agrarianism
- Environmental ethics
- Sustainable agriculture
