= Laura Moriarty =

Laura Moriarty may refer to:

- Laura Moriarty (writer, born 1952), American poet and novelist, wrote Two Cross Seizings (1980)
- Laura Moriarty (writer, born 1970), American novelist, wrote The Center of Everything (2004), ''The Rest of Her Life (2007), and While I'm Falling (2009)
