= Byron Crawford =

American journalist

Byron Garrison Crawford is a former television journalist and newspaper columnist from Louisville, Kentucky.

== Media career ==
Crawford is best known for a continuing series of reports on WHAS-TV titled "On the Road," somewhat of a localized version of the series by the same name by Charles Kuralt for CBS. The feature was later syndicated as "Sideroads" to other television stations in Kentucky, Tennessee and Ohio. Before his "On the Road" series, Crawford was a news reporter for the station. He started in radio at WAKY in Louisville as a news reporter and moved to WCKY in Cincinnati, Ohio, as a reporter. He then joined WHAS Radio and Television as a reporter when the stations were still under the same ownership as The Courier-Journal.

Crawford left WHAS in 1979 to become the Kentucky Columnist for The Courier-Journal newspaper, where his column was of a similar vein as his television work. He wrote the column three times each week until retiring in 2008.

Crawford was also the first host of the Emmy Award-winning television series Kentucky Life on Kentucky Educational Television, from the debut in September 1995 through summer 1999. He has published four books, all compilations of his columns: "Crawford's Journal" in 1986, "Kentucky Stories" in 1994, "Kentucky Footnotes" in 2010, and "The Back Page" in 2022. ref name="book" />

Today, Crawford continues his work penning the back page column, "Byron Crawford's Kentucky" for Kentucky Living magazine.

== Awards ==
In 2009 Crawford was inducted into the Kentucky Journalism Hall of Fame, and in 2017 he was honored as a Distinguished Rural Kentuckian by the Kentucky Association of Electric Cooperatives.

== Personal life ==
Crawford's son, Eric, was a sports columnist for The Courier-Journal until 2012 when he left for WDRB television.
