= Look & See: A Portrait of Wendell Berry =

2017 film by Laura Dunn

Look & See: A Portrait of Wendell Berry is a 2017 documentary film that explores the life and philosophy of American writer, farmer, and activist Wendell Berry. It was directed by Laura Dunn.
