= Port Royal, Kentucky =

Unincorporated community in Kentucky, United States

Coordinates: 38°33′19″N 85°04′49″W

Port Royal is an unincorporated community in north-eastern Henry County, Kentucky, United States.

== Location ==
The community's center is the intersection of State Highway 193 and Cane Run Road. "Port Royal is ten miles north-east from New Castle and one mile from the Kentucky River."

The elevation is 823 feet (251 m).

The ZIP code is 40058.

== Demographics ==
At the census of 2010 the population of ZIP Code Tabulation Area 40058, which is centered on Port Royal, was 64.

At the census of 2000 it was 79.

== Notable resident ==
Prior to his death in 2026, the community was home to writer Wendell Berry. His fictional community of Port William is based on Port Royal.
