= Port William (Wendell Berry) =

Fictional American rural town

Port William, Kentucky is a fictional American rural town found in each of the novels and short stories and some of the poems of Wendell Berry. The larger region, set along the western bank of the Kentucky River, consists of Port William proper and several outlying farms and settlements around the also-fictional Dawe's Landing, Squire's Landing, Goforth, and Cotman Ridge. The town is set about "twelve miles or better" south of the fictional town of Hargrave and the Ohio River.

It is generally acknowledged that Port William is a fiction inspired by Berry's own hometown of Port Royal, Kentucky. An actual town of Port William, Kentucky was established at the confluence of the Kentucky and Ohio rivers in 1792. That name was changed to Carrollton in 1838. Its location on the Ohio River relates it to Berry's larger fictional town of Hargrave.

== Stories ==
Each of Berry's fictional works is set in and around Port William. There are nine novels, fifty-eight short stories, a verse drama, and seventeen poems that touch on the people and life of the place.

The chronology of the tales stretches from the United States Civil War to 2021. Within these stories a reader encounters both momentous and ordinary events in the lives of the Beechum, Feltner, Coulter, and Catlett families, individuals of which, along with others, make up the Port William membership.

In his essay "Imagination in Place," Berry comments on his intentions for Port William: "I have made the imagined place of Port William, its neighborhood and membership, in an attempt to honor the actual place where I have lived. By means of the imagined place, over the last fifty years, I have learned to see my native landscape and neighborhood as a place unique in the world, a work of God, possessed of an inherent sanctity that mocks any human valuation that can be put upon it."

== "The Membership" ==
"The Membership" is the term by which Berry and his characters convey the bonds of a community within its given geographical location. The "membership" consists of any person who recognizes his or her place among—and responsibility for the well-being of—the land, animals, and people of the place.

In "The Wild Birds," the character Burley Coulter explains what he means by 'membership,'

"The way we are, we are members of each other. All of us. Everything. The difference ain't in who is a member and who is not, but in who knows it and who don't."

This concept is drawn from St. Paul's understanding, "For as the body is one and has many members, but all the members of that one body, being many, are one body, so also is Christ." (1 Corinthians 12.12) Concerning Burley's "Everything," Berry has said that it may be that "Burley improved on St. Paul … by telling a more comprehensive truth."

Far from an exclusive circle, membership in Port William comes to mean exactly the opposite: the grateful inclusion of any who live in devotion to the wellbeing of the town and its environs. The membership isn’t self-appointed. But it is self-identifying. Those who are devoted to the place recognize one another by their mutual inclinations and sacrificial practices.

== Narrative chronology ==
The stories and novels of Port William, are listed here according to the order in which the events of the stories occur (narrative chronology). Each is followed by the collection in which it may be found.

To that point, each of the short stories from "The Girl in the Window" to "Not a Tear" are collected in Wendell Berry: Port William Novels & Stories, The Civil War to World War II with the exceptions of "A Clearing" (now in How It Went) and "Don't Send a Boy to Do a Man's Work" (1891).

Where stories are given several dates, the most recent is used for the chronology.

- The Girl in the Window (1864) A Place in Time
- The Hurt Man (1888) That Distant Land
- "Don't Send a Boy to Do a Man's Work" (1891) Jayber Crow (ch. 21) and That Distant Land
- Fly Away, Breath (1907) A Place in Time
- A Consent (1908) Watch With Me
- Pray Without Ceasing (1912) Fidelity
- Watch With Me (1916) Watch With Me
- A Half-Pint of Old Darling (1920) Watch With Me
- The Lost Bet (1929) Watch With Me
- Nathan Coulter (1929–1941)
- Down in the Valley Where the Green Grass Grows (1930) A Place in Time
- Thicker than Liquor (1930) The Wild Birds
- Nearly to the Fair (1932) Watch With Me
- Burley Coulter’s Fortunate Fall (1934) A Place in Time
- The Solemn Boy (1934) Watch With Me
- A Jonquil for Mary Penn (1940) Fidelity
- Turn Back the Bed (1941) Watch With Me
- A Burden (1882, 1907, 1941) A Place in Time
- A Desirable Woman (1938–1941) A Place in Time
- Misery (1943) A Place in Time
- Andy Catlett: Early Education (1943) A Place in Time
- Andy Catlett: Early Travels (1943)
- Drouth (1944) A Place in Time
- Stand By Me (1921–1944) A Place in Time
- A World Lost (1944)
- A Place on Earth (1945)
- The Divide (V-J Day) How It Went
- Making It Home (1945) Fidelity
- Not a Tear (1945) A Place in Time
- One Nearly Perfect Day (1946) How It Went
- Where Did They Go? (1947) The Wild Birds
- The Dark Country (1948) A Place in Time
- The Bringer of Water (1949), a verse drama found in Farming: A Hand Book
- A New Day (1949) A Place in Time
- One of Us (1950) How It Went
- Mike (1939-1950) A Place in Time
- The Memory of Old Jack (1952)
- It Wasn’t Me (1953) The Wild Birds
- The Boundary (1965) The Wild Birds
- That Distant Land (1965) The Wild Birds
- Who Dreamt This Dream? (1966) A Place in Time
- A Friend of Mine (1967) That Distant Land
- The Wild Birds (1967) The Wild Birds
- Jayber Crow (1969)
- The Requirement (1970) A Place in Time
- Are You All Right? (1973) Fidelity
- An Empty Jacket (1974) A Place in Time
- Remembering (1976)
- Fidelity (1977) Fidelity
- The Great Interruption ... (1935-1978) How It Went
- At Home (1981) A Place in Time
- The Inheritors (1986) That Distant Land
- Sold (1991) A Place in Time
- Hannah Coulter (1922-2000)
- How It Went (1979-1994-2002) How It Went
- The Branch Way of Doing (1932-2004) How It Went
- A Place in Time (1938-2008) A Place in Time
- Dismemberment (1974-2008) How It Went
- A Conversation (1943-2013) How It Went
- A Clearing (1945-2014) How It Went
- The Art of Loading Brush (2015) How It Went
- Time Out of Time (1947-2015) How It Went
- The Order of Loving Care (2017) The Art of Loading Brush
- A Time and Times and the Dividing of Time (1944-2019) How It Went
- A Rainbow (1945-1975-2021) How It Went
- Marce Catlett: The Force of a Story (1906-2025)

NOTE: "Nothing Living Lives Alone" was originally published in The Threepenny Review (Spring 2011) and was chosen as a PEN/O. Henry Prize Story, 2012. The third section of this story has been published as "Time Out of Time (1947-2015)" in the 2022 collection How It Went.

== Poetry ==
The Port William Membership exists not only in the novels and short fiction of Wendell Berry but also in some poems that have appeared over the years. While any number of poems may be thought to contain references to the characters and situations of the fictions, this list is restricted to those poems that make explicit mention of one or more of the citizens of Port William.

Jack Beechum in "The Bringer of Water" in Farming: A Hand Book (1970) and "Work Song" in Clearing (1977), and Collected Poems 1957-1982

Kate Helen Branch in "Burley Coulter's Song for Kate Helen Branch" in Given (2005)

Andy Catlett in "1989, V" in A Timbered Choir: The Sabath Poems 1979-1997 and "In Art Rowanberry's Barn" in Given (2005)

Flora Catlett in "What Passes, What Remains" (Sabbaths 2016, VIII) in The Art of Loading Brush (2017)

Henry Catlett in "The Bringer of Water" in Farming: A Hand Book (1970)

Burley Coulter in "Window Poem" (section 27) in Openings (1968), Collected Poems 1957-1982, and The Selected Poems of Wendell Berry (1998); "The Bringer of Water" in Farming: A Hand Book (1970); "1989, V" in A Timbered Choir: The Sabath Poems 1979-1997; "Burley Coulter's Song for Kate Helen Branch" in Given (2005); and "Sabbaths 2000, VI" in Given (2005)

Jarrat Coulter in "The Bringer of Water" in Farming: A Hand Book (1970)

Nathan Coulter in "The Bringer of Water" in Farming: A Hand Book (1970)

Jayber Crow in "Sabbaths 2004, IV" in Given (2005) and "Old Man Jayber Crow" in Leavings (2010)

Hannah Feltner in "The Bringer of Water" in Farming: A Hand Book (1970)

Little Margaret (Feltner) in "The Bringer of Water" in Farming: A Hand Book (1970)

Margaret Feltner in "The Bringer of Water" in Farming: A Hand Book (1970)

Mat Feltner in "The Bringer of Water" in Farming: A Hand Book (1970) and "Work Song" in Clearing (1977) and Collected Poems 1957-1982

Virgil Feltner in "The Bringer of Water" in Farming: A Hand Book (1970)

Billy (Gibbs?), Uncle Stanley (Gibbs?), and Raymond (?) in "The Birth (Near Port William)" in Farming: A Hand Book (1970) and Collected Poems 1957-1982

Elton Penn in "Work Song" in Clearing (1977) and Collected Poems 1957-1982

Arthur Rowanberry in "A Parting" in Entries (1997) "In Art Rowanberry's Barn" in Given (2005) "Men Untrained to Comfort” in Leavings (2010), "Sabbaths 2006, IX" in Leavings (2010), "Sabbaths 2008, VI" in Leavings (2010), and "What Passes, What Remains" (Sabbaths 2016, VIII) in The Art of Loading Brush (2017)

Early Rowanberry in "What Passes, What Remains" (Sabbaths 2016, VIII) in The Art of Loading Brush (2017)

Martin Rowanberry in "1990, I" in A Timbered Choir: The Sabath Poems 1979-1997, "1992, VIII" in A Timbered Choir: The Sabbath Poems 1979-1997, and "What Passes, What Remains" (Sabbaths 2016, VIII) in The Art of Loading Brush (2017)

Pascal Sowers in "What Passes, What Remains" (Sabbaths 2016, VIII) in The Art of Loading Brush (2017)

== Bibliography ==
- Andy Catlett: Early Travels. Washington, D. C.: Shoemaker & Hoard, 2006.
- The Art of Loading Brush: New Agrarian Writings. Berkeley: Counterpoint, 2017.

[The Order of Loving Care, A Long Ancestry, The Branch Way of Doing, The Art of Loading Brush]

- That Distant Land: The Collected Stories. Washington, D. C.: Shoemaker & Hoard, 2004.
  (Along with five new stories, "this volume combines the stories found in The Wild Birds (1985), Fidelity (1992), and Watch with Me (1994), together with a map and a charting of the complex and interlocking genealogies.")

[The Hurt Man, Don't Send a Boy to Do a Man's Work, A Consent, Pray Without Ceasing, Watch With Me, A Half-Pint of Old Darling, The Lost Bet, Thicker than Liquor, Nearly to the Fair, The Solemn Boy, A Jonquil for Mary Penn, Turn Back the Bed, Making It Home, Where Did They Go?, The Discovery of Kentucky, It Wasn't Me, The Boundary, That Distant Land, A Friend of Mine, The Wild Birds, Are You Alright?, Fidelity, The Inheritors]

- Fidelity. New York: Pantheon, 1992.

[Pray without Ceasing, A Jonquil for Mary Penn, Making It Home, Fidelity, Are You All Right?]

- Hannah Coulter. Washington, D.C.: Shoemaker & Hoard. 2004.
- How It Went: Thirteen More Stories of the Port William Membership. Counterpoint, 2022.

[The Divide (V-J Day), A Conversation (1943-2013), A Clearing (1945-2014), One Nearly Perfect Day (1946), Time Out of Time (1947-2015), One of Us (1950), Dismemberment (1974-2008), The Great Interruption... (1935-1978), How It Went (1979-1994-2002), The Branch Way of Doing (1932-2004), The Art of Loading Brush (2015), A Time and Times and the Dividing of Time (1944-2019), A Rainbow (1945-1975-2021)]

- Jayber Crow. Washington, D.C.: Counterpoint, 2000.
- The Memory of Old Jack. New York: Harcourt, Brace, Jovanovich 1974. (revised Counterpoint 2001).
- Nathan Coulter. Boston: Houghton Mifflin, 1960 (revised North Point, 1985).
- A Place in Time: Twenty Stories of the Port William Membership. Berkeley: Counterpoint, 2012.

[The Girl in the Window; Fly Away, Breath; Down in the Valley Where the Green Grass Grows; Burley Coulter's Fortunate Fall; A Burden; A Desirable Woman; Misery; Andy Catlett: Early Education; Drouth; Stand By Me; Not a Tear; The Dark Country; A New Day; Mike; Who Dreamt This Dream?; The Requirement; An Empty Jacket; At Home; Sold; A Place in Time]

- A Place on Earth. Boston: Harcourt, Brace, 1967 (revised North Point,1983; Counterpoint, 2001).
- Remembering. San Francisco: North Point, 1988.
- Watch With Me and Six Other Stories of the Yet-Remembered Ptolemy Proudfoot and His Wife, Miss Minnie, Née Quinch. New York: Pantheon, 1994.

[A Consent, A Half-Pint of Old Darling, The Lost Bet, Nearly to the Fair, The Solemn Boy, Turn Back the Bed, Watch with Me]

- Wendell Berry: Port William Novels & Stories, The Civil War to World War II. Ed. Jack Shoemaker. New York: Library of America, 2018.
- Whitefoot: A Story from the Center of the World. Berkeley: Counterpoint. 2009.
- The Wild Birds: Six Stories of the Port William Membership. San Francisco: North Point, 1986.

[Thicker Than Liquor, Where Did They Go?, It Wasn't Me, The Boundary, That Distant Land, The Wild Birds]

- A World Lost. Washington, D.C.: Counterpoint, 1996.

== Resources ==
- "Wendell Berry on War and Peace: Or, Port William Versus the Empire" by Bill Kaufmann (mp3)
- "Wendell Berry (1934- )" at The Poetry Foundation
- "Mr. Wendell Berry of Kentucky" - an unofficial fan site with a complete directory of the people of Port William
