= Jack Shoemaker =

American publisher and editor

- Born: 1946 (age 79–80); California, U.S.
- Occupations: Editor, publisher, bookseller
- Organizations: The Unicorn Bookshop; Sand Dollar Booksellers & Publishers
- Known for: Small Press Distribution; North Point Press (1979–1991); Counterpoint Press
- Spouse(s): Vicki Guerin (m. 1965; div. 1991) Jane Vandenburgh (m. 1996)

Jack Shoemaker (born 1946) is an American editor and publisher, and current editorial director and vice-president at Counterpoint Press in Berkeley, California. Shoemaker has edited and published books under several imprints, including North Point, Pantheon Books, Shoemaker & Hoard, and Counterpoint. Shoemaker has published books by Guy Davenport, Romulus Linney, Gary Snyder, Wendell Berry, Evan S. Connell, MFK Fisher, James Salter, Gina Berriault, Reynolds Price, W.S. Merwin, Michael Palmer, Donald Hall, Anne Lamott, Kay Boyle, Gary Nabhan, Jane Vandenburgh, Carole Maso, and Robert Aitken. Shoemaker supports author-driven literary publishing ventures and mindfulness and political awareness in publishing. Shoemaker was one of the first American publishers of Thich Nhat Hanh, and a major publisher of Wendell Berry.

== Background ==
Jack Shoemaker was born in California and began his literary career as a bookseller in 1965 in Santa Barbara. During the next twenty-five years he owned or managed several influential independent literary bookshops, including The Unicorn Bookshop, Serendipity Books, and Sand Dollar Booksellers & Publishers. He allowed books to stay on the shelves longer than usual. He also corresponded with writers such as Gary Snyder, Robert Duncan, and Guy Davenport and stocked his store with titles they recommended. "I had good instincts, I had enormous presumption, and most of all I had good advisors," Shoemaker has said of that time. "I was, still am, an autodidact. I did not go to college, so for me the correspondence and reading formed my path in education."

== Publishing ==
Jack Shoemaker moved from bookselling to publishing. An early publishing venture, Unicorn, evolved from a bookstore in Isla Vista, near the campus of University of California-Santa Barbara operated by Shoemaker from 1967 to 1968. In that capacity, Unicorn published in 1968 a book of poems, The Cry of Vietnam, by Thich Nhat Hanh at a time when he was a little known Vietnamese Buddhist priest. A second volume published by Unicorn, Hark, Hark, the Nark, was a pamphlet that instructed readers on their civil rights in the event of an arrest for drug possession. In 1969, Shoemaker co-founded Small Press Distribution, a distributor for the work of dozens of small independent American presses. Unicorn was followed by Sand Dollar Booksellers & Publishers, which began operations in 1970 from Berkeley, California, "a bookshop for poets."

Shoemaker continued his career as a bookseller until 1979, when he co-founded North Point Press with William Turnbull, a civil engineer who loved literature. North Point began with authors Shoemaker had worked with, including Berry, Snyder, Aitken, Fisher, Connell, Salter, and Davenport. Shoemaker served as the company’s editor-in-chief for the entire life of the company. It lasted 12 years and published nearly 400 works, some of which won awards.

When North Point closed in 1991, several of its authors followed Shoemaker to Pantheon, where he served as West Coast editor of the Knopf Publishing Group. Frank H. Pearl, an entrepreneur who specialized in leveraged buyouts, recruited Shoemaker to found Counterpoint Press in 1994 in Washington, D.C., and Shoemaker’s core group of authors followed him once again. In 2004 Shoemaker left Counterpoint, and with his longtime associate Trish Hoard established a new company, Shoemaker & Hoard, Publishers, to continue his work. Soon affiliated with the Avalon Publishing Group, Shoemaker & Hoard published more than 100 titles in its few years of existence. Additional writers published by Shoemaker, either at Counterpoint or at Shoemaker & Hoard, include Michael Downing, Robert Bringhurst, Alexander Solzhenitsyn, Nicholas Christopher, Ruth Prawer Jhabvala, Peter Coyote, Jay Griffiths, Robert Hass, Ann Pancake, Jed Perl, Mary Robison, Valerie Trueblood, Lawrence Wechsler, Janet Frame, and Cynthia Shearer. Later partnering with Charlie Winton, Shoemaker purchased Counterpoint Press from the Perseus Book Group, and another press, Soft Skull Press. At that time Counterpoint Press also formed an operating agreement with Sierra Club Books.

The new endeavor, consisting now of three separate imprints, operates from offices in Berkeley, California.

== American Buddhism ==
As an editor and publisher Shoemaker has exerted influence on Buddhism in the United States, publishing notable translations of Buddhist sutras and texts, including work by Red Pine (author), Thomas Cleary, Norman Waddell, and David Hinton. Shoemaker has published in English great Zen masters, including Baisao, Bankei, Bassui, Bodhidharma, Dogen, Hakuin, Muso, Senzaki, and several others. Shoemaker first became interested in Zen Buddhism through the work of Gary Snyder and Kenneth Rexroth. Shoemaker was a student of Robert Aitken and published several books of Aitken's including Taking the Path of Zen, thought by many to be the best practical introductory guide to the study and practice of Zen. Later he co-edited with Aitken's senior Dharma heir, Nelson Foster, The Roaring Stream: A New Zen Reader, an anthology of Zen texts. "As a Buddhist, I’m simply a beginner," Shoemaker told an interviewer in 2005. "There are many of us trying to discover if there can be an authentic American Buddhism, oriented toward lay practitioners."

== Awards and honors ==
Shoemaker served from 1974–1978 on the Literature Panel of the National Endowment of the Arts, serving his last eighteen months as that panel’s chairman. He has also served on the California Arts Council, the Western States Arts Foundation panel, the North Carolina Arts Council literature panel, and several other boards and awards panels devoted to literature, the visual arts, and dance.

Together with Jack Hicks and Gary Snyder, he founded The Art of the Wild, a summer program in Squaw Valley, California, devoted to the practice and study of writing related to environmental concerns and natural history. Shoemaker also serves on the advisory board of Fishtrap, a literary non-profit in Wallowa County, Oregon, that offers workshops, conferences, and residencies to develop writing talent among Western writers. In 1981 Publishers Weekly named Shoemaker the recipient of the Carey-Thomas Award for Creative Publishing. PubWest awarded him the 2013 Jack D. Rittenhouse Award for lifetime achievement and contributions to the Western book community.

== Personal ==
Jack Shoemaker married Vicki Guerin in 1965. They had two children, Sean Shoemaker, and Demian Shoemaker. The marriage ended in divorce in 1991. In 1996 he married California novelist Jane Vandenburgh in Washington, D.C. They raised her child from a previous marriage, Eva Zimmerman. Shoemaker lives with his family in Point Richmond, California.
