= Charlie Winton =

American publisher

Charlie Winton is CEO and publisher of Counterpoint Press.

In 1976, Winton founded Publishers Group West (PGW), and was chairman and CEO for 25 years. In 1994, he created a sister corporation, Avalon Publishing Group and was its CEO. In 2002, PGW was sold to Advance Marketing Services. Winton and his partners maintained the ownership of Avalon Publishing Group.

In 2007, Avalon was sold to Perseus Books Group. Winton's latest venture, Counterpoint LLC, was created concurrently with the sale of Avalon via the acquisition and merger of three independent publishers: Counterpoint Press, Shoemaker, and Hoard and Soft Skull Press. The company maintains offices in Berkeley, California.

Winton graduated from Stanford University with a B.A. in communications in 1974. He lives in Berkeley, California.
