= Small Press Distribution =

Book distributor for small literary presses

- Founded: December 1969; 56 years ago in Berkeley, California
- Founders: Peter Howard and Jack Shoemaker
- Type: Nonprofit organization
- Location: Berkeley, California, U.S.
- Products: Catalogs
- Services: Book distribution
- Executive Director: Kent Watson (c. 2021–2024)
- Board of directors: 14 (as of 2020)
- Key people: Jean Day (Acquisitions Manager, Executive Director, 1977–1989); Laura Moriarty (Deputy Director, 1998–2018)
- Revenue: $660,000 (1999)
- Website: www.spdbooks.org
- Formerly called: Serendipity Books Distribution

Small Press Distribution (SPD) was an "exclusively literary" nonprofit book distributor for the small press that operated from 1969.

== History ==
SPD was founded in 1969 in Berkeley, California, by Peter Howard of Serendipity Books and Jack Shoemaker of Sand Dollar Press. The fledgling organization provided small-scale distribution services for only eight publishers. Initially called Serendipity Books Distribution, it was renamed Small Press Distribution by the late 1970s. Throughout the 1970s and 1980s, the organization periodically assembled the new titles of their publishers into printed catalogs, thus providing a link to underground literature for writers and readers around the US.

From 1977 to 1989, poet Jean Day was Acquisitions Manager, then Executive Director, of SPD, developing close associations with many San Francisco Bay Area writers and publishers, including Lyn Hejinian, Bob Perelman, Steve Benson, Johanna Drucker, Barrett Watten, Alan Bernheimer, Kit Robinson, Tom Mandel, and Laura Moriarty. (Moriarty herself served as Deputy Director of SPD from 1998 to 2018, remaining on the company board.)

By 1980, SPD was distributing the books of about 40 small publishers; it also "operated a full-time retail store and sponsored an array of public programs and readings." By 1990, SPD's roster of small publishers had grown to 330. SPD became an official non-profit 501(c)(3) organization in 1991. By this time, however, "'though a focal point for literary life in the Bay Area, it was hard hit by reduced NEA funding. The closing of many small independent stores... also impacted sales. A decision was made to discontinue the store and the reading series and focus on distribution."

By 1999, SPD served 572 small presses and occupied a 6,400-square-foot warehouse in Berkeley. It was awarded a Lila Wallace Reader's Digest Fund grant "for [its] role in providing a vital link in the life of independent publishing."

In 2023, SPD, via GoFundMe, fundraised over $100,000 in order to implement new operations. In February 2024, the company stated it had moved over 300,000 books from its Berkeley warehouse to Ingram in Tennessee in order to cut costs. It also stored books through Publishers Storage and Shipping, located in Michigan.

A month later, SPD announced on social media and its website that it was shutting down effective immediately, citing:

...the challenges of a rapidly changing book industry and funding environment. Several years of declining sales and the loss of grant support from almost every institution that annually supported SPD have combined to squeeze our budget beyond the breaking point. SPD lost hundreds of thousands in grants in the past few years as funders moved away from supporting the arts. The tireless efforts of a world-class staff to raise new funds, find new sales channels for our presses, and exit our expensive Berkeley warehouse couldn’t compensate for these losses. SPD exhausted every avenue in seeking emergency funding and loans to avoid the shutdown.

According to SPD's board president, "the company’s dissolution is being overseen by the Superior Court of California, which will decide how to distribute any of S.P.D.’s remaining assets to creditors."

== Controversies ==
In December 2020, SPD came under fire after a former employee posted an anonymous article on Medium with allegations of wage theft and discrimination based on race and gender, leading to an open letter calling for the resignation of executive director Brent Cunningham. By 2021, the majority of SPD staff, as well as multiple former staff members, attested to labor issues at SPD — including misconduct by multiple members of SPD leadership, wage violations, retaliation, and intimidation. Two of the former workers who attested to such labor issues had been asked to sign non-disclosure agreements. In March 2021, the organization announced the pending departure of Brent Cunningham after internal investigations commissioned by the board of directors. SPD's Board President stated that in total five employees had been underpaid. The board of directors did not publicly respond to the allegations of wage theft.

In late March 2024, when Small Press Distribution closed, many publishers publicly stated that SPD hadn't provide them owed money from previous payment periods.

== Notable publishers distributed by SPD (selected) ==
- Aunt Lute Books
- Autonomedia
- Bilingual Review Press
- BkMk Press
- Black Lawrence Press
- Bordighera Press
- Brooklyn Arts Press
- Cleveland State University Poetry Center
- Dorothy, a publishing project
- Fugue State Press
- Granary Books
- Harbor Mountain Press
- Inanna Publications
- Sixteen Rivers Press
- Tarpaulin Sky Press
- Ugly Duckling Presse
- Word Works
