= Kentucky Monthly =

US magazine

- February, 2013 cover
- Editor & Publisher: Stephen M. Vest
- Frequency: 10 times a year
- Circulation: (2019) 35,000
- Publisher: Stephen M. Vest, Editor & Publisher
- Founder: Stephen M. Vest, Kay Vest, Michael Embry
- Founded: 1998
- First issue: September 1998
- Company: Vested Interest Publications
- Country: USA
- Based in: Frankfort, Kentucky
- Language: English
- Website: www.kentuckymonthly.com
- ISSN: 1542-0507

Kentucky Monthly is a general interest regional magazine about the U.S. state of Kentucky and Kentuckians. Founded in 1998 by Stephen M. Vest, publisher, Michael Embry, editor, (who retired in 2006) and business manager Kay Vest, it featured actor George Clooney on its first (and 101st) cover and has featured such Kentucky notables as Ashley Judd, Molly Sims, Wendell Berry, Silas House, Annie Potts, and numerous others.

Based in Frankfort, Kentucky, Kentucky's capital, the magazine features all aspects of contemporary Kentucky culture and presents an annual Kentuckian of the Year award.

== History ==
In 2005, Kentucky Monthly was presented the Governor's Award in the Arts for media, the Commonwealth's highest prize in the arts. Also in 2005, Kentucky Monthly was featured in the Stu Pollard film Keep Your Distance in a scene where the main character is named Kentuckian of the Year.

Kentucky Monthly was named the official state magazine for The Cup Experience, a series of events held in conjunction with the 2008 Ryder Cup in Louisville in September 2008. Team USA won the Ryder Cup, led by Kentuckians Kenny Perry and J. B. Holmes, who were named Kentuckians of the Year. In March 2008, Kentucky Monthly was selected as the "Official Kentucky Magazine" for the 2010 Alltech FEI World Equestrian Games.

In 2008, celebrating its 10th anniversary, Kentucky Monthly published Another Serving: Kentucky Monthly's 10th Anniversary Cookbook and THAT Kind of Journalist, a collection of Vest's back-page columns. The magazine has since published: Sacred Places of Kentucky (2011); Seasoned Cooking of Kentucky (2011); Kentucky A to Z by Amanda Hervey (2012); Kentucky's Twelve Days of Christmas (2012), an anthology of Kentucky-related Christmas material edited by James B. Goode, which includes such writers as Wendell Berry, Robert Penn Warren, Irvin S. Cobb, and Harriette Simpson Arnow; and Walt's Wisdon by Walt Reichert (2014), a collection of the author's gardening columns from Kentucky Monthly. In 2016 Kentucky Monthly released the Kentucky Monthly Coloring Book in conjunction with Danville artist Robert Powell.

In 2021, Kentucky Explorer magazine was merged into Kentucky Monthly.

== Kentuckian of the Year ==
Winners of Kentucky Monthly's Kentuckian of the Year award include: Miss America 2000 Heather French Henry (1999), who has graced the cover four times, Heath High School-shooting survivor Missy Jenkins (2000), Drs. Layman Gray and Robert Dowling (2001), First Lady Judi Patton (2002), Kentucky's military (2003), KCTCS President Michael McCall (2004), author Wendell Berry (2005), Drs. A. Bennett Jenson and Shin-je Ghim (2006), and then 11-year-old Michala Riggle (2008), who raised $200,000 for autism research selling beaded bracelets. On December 26, 2008, Kentucky Monthly presented the Kentuckian of the Year Award to Riggle at a University of Louisville basketball game. In attendance was three-time heavyweight boxing champion Muhammad Ali, who contributed to Riggle's charity. As of March 1, 2008, Riggle had raised nearly $500,000 and was later a guest on The Ellen DeGeneres Show.

Academy Award-winning actor George Clooney took the honor in 2009, and Medal of Honor recipient Dakota Meyer was named Kentuckian of the Year for 2011. University of Louisville athletics director Tom Jurich received the award in 2013 after guiding 10 different Cardinal teams to Top-25 rankings in 2013, including the men's basketball team, which won the NCAA Championship, and the women's basketball team, which played in the championship game. Harlan's Jordan Smith won the honor for 2015 following his championship on NBC's The Voice.

== See also ==
- Kentucky Afield
- Kentucky Life
