= Wolf Creek National Fish Hatchery =

Coordinates: 36.87284°N 85.14488°W

Wolf Creek National Fish Hatchery is a National Fish Hatchery located just below Wolf Creek Dam in Russell County, Kentucky. The hatchery is a federal hatchery and is a part of the U.S. Fish and Wildlife Service.

== History ==
Wolf Creek National Fish Hatchery (NFH) was constructed in 1975, making it one of the most recently constructed hatcheries in the federal system. With 70 hatcheries nationwide, Wolf Creek NFH is one of 14 hatcheries in the U.S. Fish and Wildlife Service's Southeast Region. The station currently produces approximately 1,000,000 rainbow, brown and brook trout annually. In cooperation with the Kentucky Department of Fish and Wildlife Resources, fish are stocked into over 100 different public fishing waters in the state. No private waters are stocked. Wolf Creek NFH is also working toward the recovery of several threatened or endangered species, including the endangered relict darter (Etheostoma chienense), threatened spotfin chub (Erimonax monachus), and threatened blackside dace (Chrosomus cumberlandensis). Visitation to the hatchery is over 100,000 annually.

The hatchery's water supply comes from Lake Cumberland at a depth ranging from 25 to 100 feet (8 to 30 metres) below the lake's surface. The water temperatures range from 40 to 65 °F (4 to 18 °C) depending on the time of year. The water gravity-flows through the hatchery at rates of up to 15,000 US gallons (56,780 L; 12,490 imp gal) per minute.

== Programs ==
The Wolf Creek National Fish Hatchery Visitor/Environmental Education Center opened to the public in September 2006. The new facility was the first center of its kind at a National Fish Hatchery. Through state-of-the-art exhibits, classroom, indoor theater and gift shop, the center serves as a learning resource for all visitors, especially school children from the region.

The center also offers a myriad of outreach programs and workshops (including the annual Catch a Rainbow Kids Fishing Derby, held on the first Saturday in June each year) and also launched a newly created environmental education curriculum, which is designed for hatcheries and tailored to meet the needs of teachers in Kentucky. The facility is also supported by the Friends of Wolf Creek National Fish Hatchery, Inc. and a strong volunteer staff.

Friends of Wolfcreek fully fund, through support of charitable giving the events held at Wolf Creek. The Friends Group is responsible for raising the funds, ensuring that all events are not only fun, but educational.

Events include the Catch a Rainbow Fishing Derby, held the first Saturday in June, to coincide with Kentucky's free fishing weekend. The Catch a Smile event held in September for local school aged special needs, The Senior Fishing Derby, for senior citizens, in local nursing homes, and the Wounded Warrior Fishing derby, allowing veterans from all eras a chance to fish the lake, and the trout stream. These last three events are held in September.

Also the Hatchery hosts an Earth day event, an all day play event, several craft classes, and a Christmas event.
