= Kentucky Department of Fish and Wildlife Resources =

U.S. state government agency

Conservation Management overview
- Formed: March 12, 1912; 114 years ago
- Headquarters: Frankfort, Kentucky
- Employees: 600
- Annual budget: $50 Million
- Conservation Management executive: Rich Storm, Commissioner
- Website: Kentucky Fish and Wildlife Resources Website

The Kentucky Department of Fish and Wildlife Resources, an agency of the Kentucky Tourism, Arts and Heritage Cabinet, is responsible for the conservation of wildlife resources and for boating projects in the state. A commissioner appointed by the Fish and Wildlife Commission heads the department. The commission—which oversees the department's commissioner and promulgates regulations governing fishing, hunting, and boating—is a nine-member bipartisan board appointed by the governor from a list of candidates nominated by active hunters and anglers in each of nine geographic districts in the state.

Financial support of the department is derived through the sale of hunting and fishing licenses, boat registrations, federal grants and numerous other receipts. The department has a $68 million budget and employs about 400 full-time staff and more than 100 interim (seasonal) employees and contract labor.

== Mission statement ==
The department's mission is to conserve, protect and enhance Kentucky's fish and wildlife resources and provide outstanding opportunities for fishing, hunting, trapping, boating, shooting sports, wildlife viewing, and related activities.

== History of the Department: 1945 to 1995 ==
- 1912: Kentucky Division of Game and Fish formed as a small commission with limited staff. It focuses on regulations to protect and help recover the fish and wildlife populations of the state that had been depleted as a result of unregulated exploitation of various kinds, as well as rapid habitat loss.
- 1944: Department reorganized under a civil service structure, with an emphasis on professional, science-based conservation. Earl Wallace appointed director.
- 1945: Division purchases experimental Game Farm outside of Frankfort for $12,575—for propagation of game birds, animals; experiments with trees, shrubs for improvement of wildlife environment. Nation's first Junior Conservation Club program begins. Kentucky deer population is less than 1,000. Division of Publicity (Public Relations) and Conservation Education begins. Nine law enforcement districts align with congressional districts. Commissioner Earl Wallace announces a department magazine, Happy Hunting Ground, to inform and educate the public. The first issue is published in December 1945, with a press run of 15,000 and a subscription cost of 50 cents a year.
- 1946: First legal deer hunt (January 2–14) in 30 years; $15 tag required if deer is taken. Big Game Restoration Program, cooperative quail raising project with sportsmen begin. Two wildlife biologists pioneer process of live-trapping wild turkeys for restocking. 181,153 hunting licenses sold.
- 1948: Amendment to Kentucky Statutes legalizes hunting raccoons with dogs. Statewide development of Big Game Refuges begins, continues to 1951. Legislature approves bill allowing fishing during the month of May (previously banned to protect fish during spawning) and raises the cost of fishing license from $1 to $2. First official documented use of aircraft to apprehend poachers. Kentucky hosts 10th Annual Crow Shooting Championship (June 26–27).
- 1952: General Assembly rewrites game and fish laws, changes name of agency from Division of Game and Fish to Kentucky Department of Fish and Wildlife Resources. Kentucky Afield radio show premieres (15-minute weekly series). Experimental release of Great Plains jackrabbits in Mercer, Pendleton and Hancock counties. Commission orders closed season on all game November 6–16. All netting operations in Tennessee River below Kentucky Dam banned due to widespread violations. County licenses eliminated; only statewide licenses available. Junior hunting license for under age 16 and 10-day nonresident license begin. 119 conservation officers employed.
- 1953: Kentucky Afield-TV premieres on WAVE-TV. First color photo appears on cover of Happy Hunting Ground. Tradewater WMA land acquisition 724 acres (2.9 km^{2}). Kentucky Department of Fish and Wildlife Resources receives money from John A. Kleber estate to establish songbird sanctuary; the Department acquires Kleber Sanctuary 2,228 acres (9.0 km^{2}).
- 1955: By this year, 21 public lakes are complete or land purchased to create public fishing opportunities. Fisheries project "Small Lake and Stream Investigation and Management" begins. Ballard WMA land acquisition 8,373 acres (34 km^{2}). Conservation officers must have permission from central office to hunt first 10 days of any hunting season.
- 1956: Happy Hunting Ground subscription cost raised to $1.00 a year.
- 1957: First formal training for Conservation Officers given by: Dept. of Personnel, Kentucky State Police, County Court Officials.
- 1960: First spring turkey season (April 27–29) in 35 years.
- 1961: Buckhorn, Rough and Dewey lakes have 12" size limit on black bass. Trout stocking program begins.
- 1966: Happy Hunting Ground begins using color photos on the inside of the publication.
- 1971: Arnold L. Mitchell becomes commissioner. Amended Pittman-Robertson Act makes some funds available for hunter training.
- 1973: Minor Clark Fish Hatchery at Cave Run Lake begins operations. Muskellunge and walleye restoration begins in streams and reservoirs. Second CO dies in line of duty—Denver Tabor drowns July 20 in Ohio River attempting to save a 10-year-old.
- 1975: Wolf Creek National Fish Hatchery opens. Kentucky uses part of federal aid money to produce 10-week television series on hunter safety and ethics, airs on Kentucky Educational Television. Kentucky becomes second state in nation to certify more than one million safe hunters. Yellowbank WMA 4,483 acres (18 km^{2}) and Beech Creek WMA 1,260 acres (5.1 km^{2}) land acquisitions.
- 1976: Modern deer stocking begins with mass stocking techniques and check stations. First fish kill investigation resulting in court's acceptance of agency's assessment procedures, monetary values on fish. Fisheries environmental section established. Formal training becomes requirement for COs; receive 160 hours instruction in basic fish and wildlife law enforcement at Eastern Kentucky University. 323,327 hunting licenses sold.
- 1978: Wild turkey restoration begins. Crooked Creek Study begins—multi-state research evaluating rotenone effectiveness. White City WMA 5,472 acres (22 km^{2}) land acquisition.
- 1978: Carl E. Kays becomes commissioner. Wild turkey population is 2,380.
- 1981: Trout stamp debuts.
- 1982: Nongame Program begins; studies distribution and management of species not hunted or fished; partial funding by voluntary contributions through state income tax check-off. Osprey restocking begins. Wild turkey population is 7,000. First state issued patrol vehicles for Conservation Officers
- 1984: Statewide VHF Radio system operational. All CO's issued state vehicles. (Jeep Trucks)
- 1985: Waterfowl stamp debuts.
- 1986: Access site development project begins to improve boat and bank access for anglers. Upland Game Program begins. Fall waterfowl hunters required to use steel shot for first time in Western Waterfowl Zone. Kentucky Department of Fish and Wildlife takes control of Frankfort Fish Hatchery, begins turning it into a state-of-the-art facility. "Museum" exhibit area disappears as Game Farm fisheries lab gets more offices. Legislature passes law giving conservation officers full police powers. Swan Lake WMA land acquisition 2,537 acres (10 km^{2}) ($2,300,000). Annual magazine subscription rate increases to $5.00.
- 1987: Idea for wildlife education center on Game Farm is born. Law Enforcement uses mounted wildlife (deer, turkey) as decoys to apprehend violators. First fish and wildlife conservation officer training academy. Third conservation officer killed in line of duty—Robert C. Banker shot March 19 while checking a fishing license. Happy Hunting Ground outdoor calendar debuts.
- 1989: Conservation Officers granted full police authority
- 1990: Aquatic resource education program begins, provides educational programs, materials and learning experiences for every aspect of Kentucky's population. Ohio River Fisheries Management Team established. Division of Public Affairs established; begins comprehensive planning and public involvement.
- 1991: Otter restoration starts, continuing through 1994. Division of Public Affairs adds "Policy" to its name, helps department leaders make better decisions by providing information and developing processes. Hunter education course required by regulation. Divisions of public relations and conservation education merge, forming Division of Information and Education (I&E). Conservation officer entry-level requirements include college degree.
- 1992: Name of magazine changes from Happy Hunting Ground to Kentucky Afield
- 1993: C. Tom Bennett becomes commissioner. Peregrine falcon restoration begins.
- 1994: Becoming an Outdoors Woman begins. Division of Water Patrol joins Kentucky Department of Fish and Wildlife Resources. Law Enforcement and Water Patrol begin cross-training officers. R. F. Tarter WMA land acquisition 1,170 acres (4.7 km^{2}) ($357,381).
- 1995: Dr. James C. Salato Wildlife Education Center opens (Oct. 1) at the Game Farm. Restoring Our Wildlife Heritage program introduces collector art. Kentucky Wildlife Viewing Guide begins sales. Fiscal Control renamed Division of Administrative Services. Kentucky Department of Fish and Wildlife and Kentucky Educational Television produce hunter education classes for television. Waterfowl hunters required to use U. S. Fish and Wildlife Service-approved nontoxic shot. Tim Farmer becomes Kentucky Afield-TV host.
- 2001: Division of Water Patrol Regions Abolished, and all officers wear green uniforms. Recruit Class #8 members were the first class to graduate as Wildlife & Boating Officers. Use of Water Patrol Officer & Conservation Officer titles discontinued.
- 2006: Wildlife & Boating Officer title discontinued, Conservation Officer title returned to use for Law Enforcement Officers.

== District Commission system ==
Kentucky Fish and Wildlife is directed by a commissioner, and overseen by nine district commission members. The commissioner manages direction and operations of the agency. Commission members serve as an oversight board, recommending fish, wildlife and boating regulations and statutes (pending final action by applicable legislative committees for regulations, or the legislature as a whole for statutes) and approving large-scale contracts such as major research projects. When a commission member's term is due to expire, a nomination election is held in the applicable district; five candidates for district commission member are nominated through votes cast by local hunters and anglers in each district, who must be licensed to hunt or fish. The five nominees receiving the most votes are sent to the governor for appointment of one as district commission member. This system was created by Kentucky sportsmen to ensure that both managerial and financial control of the state's wildlife resources stayed out of political control.

== Organization ==
The Kentucky Department of Fish and Wildlife has gone through a great deal of organizational changes through the years. Today it consists of the Commissioner's office staff and seven divisions: Administrative Services; Wildlife; Fisheries; Law Enforcement; Information and Education; Engineering and Information Technology; and Marketing.

=== Terms of commissioners ===
- 1944–1958: Earl Wallace
- 1958–1971: Minor Clark
- 1971–1978 Arnold Mitchell
- 1978–1985: Carl E. Kays
- 1985–1993: Don McCormick
- 1993–2005: Tom Bennett
- 2005–2013: Jonathan Gassett
- 2014–2018: Gregory K Johnson
- 2019–present: Rich Storm

== Volunteer ==
Volunteers - unpaid staff - are involved in several aspects of the work of the Kentucky Department of Fish and Wildlife, including at the Salato Wildlife Education Center. Volunteers work in conservation education, help with special activities, help with plants, trails and special projects, and lead hunter education programs.

== Fallen officers ==
Since the establishment of the Kentucky Department of Fish and Wildlife Resources, six officers have died in the line of duty.

| Officer | Date of death | Details |
|---|---|---|
| Game Warden Elijah Roberts | Saturday, September 14, 1918 | Gunfire |
| Conservation Officer John C. Martin | Thursday, August 7, 1947 | Gunfire |
| Conservation Officer Denver Earlington Tabor | Friday, July 20, 1973 | Drowned |
| Conservation Officer Robert C. Banker | Thursday, March 19, 1987 | Gunfire |
| Conservation Officer Douglas Wayne Bryant | Monday, May 19, 2003 | Vehicle pursuit |
| Conservation Officer Bernard Dean Ratliff | Monday, June 21, 1999 | Heart attack while training |

== See also ==
- List of law enforcement agencies in Kentucky
- Wolf Creek National Fish Hatchery
- List of state and territorial fish and wildlife management agencies in the United States
