= Lionel Basney =

American poet

Lionel Basney (December 2, 1946 – August 21, 1999) was a poet and professor of English at Calvin College in Grand Rapids, Michigan. Prior to his time at Calvin, Basney taught at Houghton College, where his father also taught before him. Basney was interested in Samuel Johnson, William Shakespeare, and Ned Ludd and the origins of the Luddite movement. He was the author of An Earth-Careful Way of Life: Christian Stewardship and the Environmental Crisis. Wendell Berry's Life is a Miracle: An Essay Against Modern Superstition is dedicated to Basney.

In 2000, The Conference on Christianity and Literature at Pepperdine University began awarding the annual Lionel Basney Prize "to the article deemed by the CCL Publications Committee to be the most outstanding article of the year in Christianity and Literature". According to the website, "the award...commemorates both the scholarly career and the personal character of a teacher, scholar, poet, and essayist who, during nearly two decades of affiliation with Calvin College, was deeply committed to CCL and all that it seeks to promote."

Basney's own work received awards and critical recognition, particularly the essays that were published in The American Scholar in 1999 and 2002. "Immanuel's Ground" was included in The Best Christian Writing 2000 (ed. John Wilson) and The Best Spiritual Writing 2000 (ed. Philip Zaleski.) "Teacher: Eleven Notes" not only was included in The Best Christian Writing 2002 (ed. John Wilson) but also received The American Scholar's award for Best Essay in January 2003.

According to Basney,

Any change deep enough to protect life on the planet will have to be a repentance. It will have to be that concrete. No 'deepening' consciousness, no change in 'perspective,' no keeping back with the Joneses will do. We have to turn around in the places where we stand. Realistic confession, honest repentance, concrete restitutions. Small, specific, practical turnings.

— An Earth-Careful Way of Life: Christian Stewardship and the Environmental Crisis

== Works ==
- "Myth, History and Time in The Lord of the Rings" in Understanding the Lord of the Rings: The Best of Tolkien Criticism By Rose A. Zimbardo, Neil David Isaacs 2004 Houghton Mifflin ISBN 0-618-42253-6.
- "Teacher: Eleven Notes." The American Scholar: 71:1 (January 2002): 75–89.
- "The Snow Plough Man." Christianity and Literature: 50:3 (Spring 2001): 412–435.
- An Earth-Careful Way of Life: Christian Stewardship and the Environmental Crisis, Vancouver, BC: Regent College Publishing, 2000 ISBN 1-57383-172-7. (Original Publication Information: Downers Grove, IL: InterVarsity Press, 1994 ISBN 0-8308-1322-5.)
- "Immanuel's Ground." The American Scholar: 68.3 (Summer 1999): 109–120.
- "Meditations for Lent 1999". The Banner February–March 1999.
- "Questioning Progress: The Resurrection of Ned Ludd". Books & Culture: 4.5 (September/October 1998): 18.
- "Technolatry Unmasked". The Other Side: 33.3 (May/June 1997).
- "Mia California: An Opera Journal" in Virginia Quarterly Review, Spring 1996.
- "Five Notes on the Didactic Tradition, in Praise of Wendell Berry" in Paul Merchant, editor. Wendell Berry (American Authors Series). Lewiston, Idaho: Confluence, 1991: 174–183.
- "Narrative and Judgment in the Life of Savage." Biography: 14.2 (Spring 1991): 153–64.
- "Prudence in the Life of Savage." ELN: 28.2 (Dec. 1990): 17–24.
- "'His Proper Business': Johnson's Adjustment to Society." Texas Studies in Literature and Language: 32.3 (Fall 1990): 397–416.
- "Having Your Meaning at Hand: Work in Snyder and Berry", in: World, Self, Poem: Essays on Contemporary Poetry from the Jubilation of Poets, ed Leonard M. Trawick. Kent, Ohio: Kent State University Press, 1990: 130–143.
- "Review of Collected Poems 1957-1982." Christianity and Literature 25 (Summer 1986): 31–32.
- "God and Peter Wimsey." Christianity Today 17 (1973): 27–28
- "The Balanced Mind: Johnson's Christian Empiricism"; Christian Scholar's Review III:3 (1973).
- "Ecology and the Scriptural Concept of the Master"; Christian Scholar's Review III:1 (1973): 49–50.
- "'Lucidus Ordo': Johnson and Generality" Eighteenth-Century Studies, Vol. 5, No. 1 (Autumn, 1971): 39–57.
