= Kentucky Life =

American television program (1995–present)

- Presented by: Byron Crawford (1995–2000); Dave Shuffett (2001–2015); Amy Hess (2015); Doug Flynn (2015–2023); Chip Polston (2023–present)
- Country of origin: United States
- Original language: English

Production
- Executive producer: Brandon Wickey
- Production location: Lexington, Kentucky
- Running time: 30 minutes

Original release
- Network: Kentucky Educational Television
- Release: September 23, 1995 – present

Kentucky Life is a television program on Kentucky Educational Television (KET) that features profiles of people, places and ideas of Kentucky. Founded in 1995, its mission was to help Kentuckians celebrate unique and regional characters and cultures. By May 1996, Kentucky Life was KET's most watched local production.

== History ==
The first five seasons the show's debut in 1995 and 1999 were hosted by Louisville Courier-Journal columnist Byron Crawford. Outdoorsman and television veteran Dave Shuffett, former host of Kentucky Afield, hosted Kentucky Life from season six to 20 between 1999 and 2015, followed by former Major League Baseball player Doug Flynn who hosted the show from seasons 21 to 27 between 2016 and 2022. Chip Polston, a frequent on-air volunteer during KET's pledge drives and former host of televised Kentucky Lottery drawings and Mixed Media, a KET arts series produced in the early 2000s, was announced as the new host starting with season 28 in January 2023.

== Awards ==
Kentucky Life was awarded a regional Emmy Award from the Ohio Valley Chapter of the National Academy of Television Arts and Sciences on August 2, 2014, in the Human Interest Program category for "Double Dan Horsemanship," a feature on world-renowned horse trainers in Nicholasville, Kentucky.

== See also ==
- Kentucky Afield
- Kentucky Monthly
