= Paul B. Thompson (philosopher) =

American philosopher

Paul B. Thompson is professor emeritus at Michigan State University, where he held the W.K. Kellogg Chair in Agricultural Food and Community Ethics before retiring in 2022. Thompson was born in 1951 in Springfield, Missouri. He earned his B.A. at Emory University before going on to earn a Ph.D. in philosophy at the State University of New York at Stony Brook. He formerly taught at Texas A&M University and Purdue University before joining MSU, where he continues to do research on ethical and philosophical questions dealing with agriculture and food and especially the development of agricultural techno-science.

He is a member of the Editorial Advisory Board for Public Philosophy Journal.

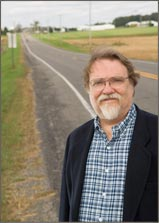
Paul B. Thompson, W.K. Kellogg Chair in Agricultural Food and Community Ethics at Michigan State University. Thompson was instrumental in developing the field of philosophy of agriculture.

== Contributions to philosophy ==
Thompson has served on national and international committees on agricultural biotechnology such as the International Advisory Panel for the PEGASUS Project on Animal Biotechnology, the Advisory Committee on Biotechnology for the Board of Agriculture and Natural Resources (part of the National Research Council based in Washington D.C.), The Scientific Advisory Committee for the Mansholt Graduate School at Wageningen University and Research Institute, and was the Chair of the Council on Agricultural Science and Technology's Working Group on Ethics and Animal Agricultural Biotechnology from 2006 to 2010. Thompson also contributed to the National Research Council report entitled The Environmental Effects of Transgenic Plants. He is a past President of the Society for Philosophy and Technology and the Agriculture, Food and Human Values Society.

== Selected works ==
- P. B. Thompson, From Field to Fork: Food Ethics for Everyone. New York: Oxford University Press, 2015.
- P. B. Thompson, The Agrarian Vision: Sustainability and Environmental Ethics. Lexington, KY: The University Press of Kentucky, 2010.
- P. B. Thompson, Ed. The Ethics of Intensification: Agricultural Development and Cultural Change. Dordrecht, NL: Springer, 2008.
- K. David and P. B. Thompson, Eds. What Can Nanotechnology Learn from Biotechnology? Social and Ethical Lessons for Nanoscience from the Debate over Agrifood Biotechnology and GMOs. Burlington, MA: Academic Press, 2008.
- P. B. Thompson and T. C. Hilde, Eds. The Agrarian Roots of Pragmatism. Nashville, TN: Vanderbilt University Press, 2000.
- P. B. Thompson, Agricultural Ethics: Research, Teaching and Public Policy, Ames, IA: Iowa State University Press, 1998.
- P.B. Thompson, Food Biotechnology in Ethical Perspective, London: Chapman and Hall (Blackie Academic and Professional), 1997.
- P.B. Thompson, The Spirit of the Soil: Agriculture and Environmental Ethics, New York and London: Routledge Publishing Co., 1995.
- W. Browne, J. Skees, L. Swanson, P.B. Thompson, and L. Unnevehr, Sacred Cows and Hot Potatoes: Agrarian Myths and Policy Realities, Boulder, CO: Westview Press, 1992.

== See also ==
- American philosophy
- List of American philosophers
- Environmental ethics
