= Kentucky Afield =

Kentucky Afield is the communications arm of the Kentucky Department of Fish and Wildlife Resources. Kentucky Afield consists of a magazine, radio show and television program. The magazine is a quarterly periodical. The television show is a 30-minute broadcast airing on the Kentucky Educational Television (KET) and YouTube. The radio show has transitioned from its original format into a podcast. These outlets are devoted to the fish and wildlife resources of Kentucky and covers a broad range of outdoor topics, including angling, hunting, conservation and land management.

The television show is the longest continuously running outdoors television show in the United States and the fourth oldest in the nation for all television shows.

== Magazine ==
Kentucky Afield
- Editor/Writer: Dave Baker
- Associate Editor/Writer: Lee McClellan, Associate Editor/Writer
- Frequency: 4 times per year
- Publisher: Kentucky Department of Fish & Wildlife Resources
- Founder: Earl Wallace
- Founded: December 1945; 80 years ago
- Country: United States
- Language: English
- Website: fw.ky.gov/Kentucky-Afield/Pages/Magazine.aspx

Kentucky Afield magazine began as Kentucky Happy Hunting Ground. Commissioner Earl Wallace founded the publication and appointed its first editor, Harry Towles, for the inaugural edition in December 1945 as a bi-monthly publication. The initial press run was 15,000 copies, with the subscription price set at 50 cents a year. The first issue featured a hunting dog on the cover and a drawing of pioneer Daniel Boone in the upper left hand corner.

In 1947, Happy Hunting Ground absorbed a magazine published by The League of Kentucky Sportsmen (Kentucky's oldest conservation group). An agreement signed by League President Al Blum and Kentucky Division of Game and Fish Commissioner W. G. Buchanan on June 16, 1947, determined the Division of Game and Fish would publish and mail the magazine. The League could submit content and appoint an associate editor in return for turning over the 25 cent fee it charged its members for a magazine.

In 1992, the magazine's name changed to Kentucky Afield. The name change not only mirrored the names of the department's television and radio shows, but it emphasized all the outdoors, not just hunting. Since 2000, staff artist Rick Hill has painted the covers of the magazine. The exception was 2004, when the magazine switched to photo covers while Hill painted "Kentucky Fish," a department poster featuring 27 of the state's most recognized fish.

Kentucky Afield aims to publish academic writing with input from numerous subject experts employed by Kentucky Fish and Wildlife. It serves as an ongoing historical record of the department's research and accomplishments.

== Radio ==
Kentucky Afield Podcast
- Running time: 30 minutes
- Country of origin: United States
- Language: English
- Executive producer: Chase Wininger
- Original release: 1952 – present
- Website: https://fw.ky.gov/Kentucky-Afield/Pages/Podcast.aspx

A radio program was added in 1952.

== Television ==
Kentucky Afield
- Presented by: Ron Rhody (1953–1957); Hope Carleton (1957–1980); Jeremy Dreier (1980–1988); Tim Michaels (1988–1989); Dave Shuffett (1989–1995); Tim Farmer (1995–2016); Chad Miles (2016–present)
- Country of origin: United States
- Original language: English

Production
- Executive producer: Chase Wininger
- Production location: Lexington, Kentucky
- Running time: 30 minutes

Original release
- Network: WAVE-TV (1953–1985); Kentucky Educational Television (1985–present)
- Release: 1953 – present

The radio program was followed by a television show in 1953 when it debuted on WAVE TV. Ron Rhody delivered a weekly fishing report on Saturday mornings. In 1957, Hope Carleton, who was a Kentucky Department of Fish and Wildlife Resources conservation officer, was named host and remained so until his retirement in 1980. He was replaced with Jeremy Dreier.

In 1985, Dreier forged a deal with Kentucky Educational Television to air the show statewide. Dreier was replaced as host by Tim Michaels in 1988 and then Dave Shuffett from 1989 until 1995. Under Shuffett, the format of the show changed into a magazine-styled format. Tim Farmer took over from Shuffett in 1995 and remained the show's host until December 2015. Chad Miles assumed hosting duties for the show in 2016.

== See also ==
- Kentucky Life
- Kentucky Monthly
