= Tim Farmer =

American television host

- Born: Timothy Farmer; March 18, 1964 (age 62); Louisville, Kentucky, US
- Occupation: Television host and producer
- Children: 5
- Parents: Jerry Farmer; Sherry Farmer
- Website: www.timfarmerscountrykitchen.com/about-tim

Timothy Farmer (born March 18, 1964) is an American outdoorsman, musician, and television presenter. He is known as the host and executive producer of the television shows Kentucky Afield, Tim Farmer's Country Kitchen, and Tim Farmer's Homemade Jam, for which he has won a total of five regional Emmy awards. A motorcycle accident in 1984 left Farmer without the use of his right arm, and he has since worked with other Kentuckians to cope with and overcome similar physical disabilities

== Early life ==
Farmer grew up in Mason and Carter Counties in northeastern Kentucky. He is the son of Jerry and Sherry Farmer, and has one older sister, Deborah, and one younger brother, Jonathon. After graduating high school, Tim enlisted in the United States Marine Corps. After completing basic training in Parris Island, South Carolina, Tim was stationed at Millington Naval Air Base, near Memphis, Tennessee. He was honorably discharged following a 1984 motorcycle accident that left him unable to use his right arm.

== Television career ==
=== Kentucky Afield ===
Farmer is the former host and executive producer of Kentucky Afield, produced by the Kentucky Department of Fish & Wildlife Resources. Farmer hosted Kentucky Afield from 1995 until 2016, following previous host Dave Shuffett. Kentucky Afield is the longest continuously running outdoor TV show in the United States, beginning broadcasts in 1953. On the show, Farmer has overcome the physical limitations caused by his right arm's paralysis. Most notably, he has learned to shoot a bow and arrow by drawing the bow with his teeth. Farmer is also known for his sign-off, saying "I hope to see you in the woods or on the water." Tim has won 5 Emmys.

=== Tim Farmer's Country Kitchen ===
Beginning production in 2012, Tim Farmer's Country Kitchen highlights country recipes and Kentucky restaurants and food producers. The show is hosted by Farmer and his wife Nicki and often features friends and other members of their family. It airs on Kentucky Educational Television (KET), KET2 and KETKY in Kentucky, and it is distributed through the National Educational Telecommunications Association to Public Broadcasting System stations nationwide, and online at YouTube and CarbonTV.

=== Tim Farmer's Homemade Jam ===
Produced since 2013 and airing on KET, KET2 and KETKY, Tim Farmer's Homemade Jam showcases Kentucky musicians. Guests of the show have included J. D. Crowe, Bobby Osborne and Carl Hurley.

== Awards ==
- 1996 KAGC Communicator of the Year
- 1997 Ashland Community College Distinguished Alumnus Award
- 1999 Commissioned a Kentucky Colonel by Governor Paul E. Patton
- 2000 KAGC Gold Screen Award of Excellence
- 2002 First Place NAGC Gold Screen Competition News Program
- 2002 Second Place NAGC Gold Screen Competition Educational Program
- 2003 First Place NAGC Gold Screen Competition News Program
- 2004 KAGC Award of Excellence
- 2005 Ohio Valley Regional Emmy Award Recipient for Human Interest
- 2008 Ohio Valley Regional Emmy Award Recipient for best program host/moderator/narrator
- 2013 Ohio Valley Regional Emmy Award Recipient for best program host/moderator/narrator
- 2013 Ohio Valley Regional Emmy Award Recipient for Health Science and Environment
- 2014 Ohio Valley Regional Emmy Award Recipient for best program host/moderator/narrator
- 2016 Honored by the Regular Session of The Senate of the Commonwealth of Kentucky, Senate Resolution No. 126
- 2011 Commissioned a Kentucky Colonel by Governor Steve Beshear
- 2023 Kentucky Electric Cooperatives Distinguished Rural Kentuckian
