= Gene Logsdon =

Eugene (Gene) H. Logsdon
- Born: November 5, 1931; Upper Sandusky, Ohio
- Died: May 31, 2016 (aged 84); Upper Sandusky, Ohio
- Occupations: farmer, author
- Spouse: Carol (Downs) Logsdon
- Parent(s): Gerald and Catherine (Rall) Logsdon

Gene Logsdon (November 5, 1931 – May 31, 2016) was an American man of letters, cultural and economic critic, and farmer. He was a prolific author of essays, novels, and nonfiction books about agrarian issues, ideals, and techniques.

Gene Logsdon farmed in Upper Sandusky, Ohio. He wrote many books and hundreds of articles for numerous publications including New Farm, Mother Jones, Orion, Utne Reader, Organic Gardening, Draft Horse Journal and the Wall Street Journal.

== Works ==
Gene Logsdon blogged at The Contrary Farmer blog.

=== Nonfiction ===
- Letter to a Young Farmer: How to Live Richly without Wealth on the New Garden Farm (2017)
- Gene Everlasting: A Contrary Farmer's Thoughts on Living Forever (2014)
- A Sanctuary of Trees: Beechnuts, Birdsongs, Baseball Bats, and Benedictions (2012)
- Holy Shit: Managing Manure To Save Mankind (2010 ISBN 978-1-60358-251-3)
- Small-Scale Grain Raising, Second Edition: An Organic Guide to Growing, Processing, and Using Nutritious Whole Grains, for Home Gardeners and Local Farmers (2009)
- The Mother of All Arts: Agrarianism and the Creative Impulse (Culture of the Land) (2007)
- All flesh is Grass: Pleasures & Promises of Pasture Farming (2004)
- The Pond Lovers (2003)
- Wyeth People (2003)
- Living at Nature's Pace: Farming and the American Dream (2000)
- Good Spirits: A New Look at Ol' Demon Alcohol (2000)
- You Can Go Home Again: Adventures of a Contrary Life (1998)
- The Big Things in Life are the Little Things (1998, with Steve Zender)
- The Contrary Farmer's Invitation to Gardening (1997)
- The Contrary Farmer (1995)
- The Low-Maintenance House (1987)
- Moneysaving Secrets: A Treasury of Salvaging, Bargaining, Recycling, and Scavenging Techniques (1986)
- Gene Logsdon's Practical Skills: A Revival of Forgotten Crafts, Techniques, and Traditions (1985)
- Wildlife in the Garden: How to Live in Harmony With Deer, Raccoons, Rabbits, Crows, and Other Pesky Creatures (1983)
- Organic Orcharding: A Grove of Trees to Live In (1981)
- Getting Food from Water: A Guide to Backyard Aquaculture (1979, Digital Library Copy)
- The Gardener's Guide to Better Soil (1978)
- Small-Scale Grain Raising (1977)
- Successful Berry Growing (1974)
- Homesteading: How to Find New Independence on the Land (1973)
- Two Acre Eden: Finding the Good Life on Your Own Piece of Land (1971)

=== Fiction ===
- Pope Mary and the Church of Almighty Good Food (2010)
- The Last of the Husbandmen: A Novel of Farming Life (2008)
- The Lords of Folly (2007)
- The Man Who Created Paradise: A Fable (Ohio Bicentennial) (2001, with Gregory Spaid and Wendell Berry)

=== Awards ===
2000 Ohioana Career Award
