= GED Connection =

PBS instructional television program

- Genre: Educational/Instructional
- Country of origin: United States
- Original language: English

Production
- Production location: Lexington, Kentucky
- Running time: 29 minutes
- Production company: Kentucky Educational Television

Original release
- Network: PBS

GED Connection is a television program on PBS that provides instruction on how to pass the General Educational Development (GED) test. It is part of an instructional course that also includes workbooks and practice tests. GED Connection is part of a larger program called LiteracyLink created by PBS, Kentucky Educational Television, the National Center on Adult Literacy, and the Kentucky Department of Education.
