= Laura Moriarty (writer, born 1952) =

American poet and novelist (born 1952)

- Moriarty in 2009
- Born: April 8, 1952 (age 74); Saint Paul, Minnesota, U.S.
- Occupations: Poet, novelist

Laura Moriarty (born April 8, 1952) is an American poet and novelist.

== Life and work ==
Moriarty was born in Saint Paul, Minnesota, grew up on Cape Cod in Massachusetts and has lived in Northern California since 1966. She attended Sacramento State University and the University of California at Berkeley in the 1970s. She was married to the poet Jerry Estrin until his death in 1993, and is currently married to the poet/librarian Nick Robinson.

Moriarty was the Archives Director for the Poetry Center and American Poetry Archives at San Francisco State University from 1986 to 1997. She received a Poetry Center Book Award in 1984 for Persia. She has also been awarded a Gerbode Foundation grant, a residency at the Foundation Royaumont in France, a New Langton Arts Award in Literature and a grant from the Fund for Poetry. Moriarty has taught at Mills College, and Naropa University, among other places, and served as Deputy Director of Small Press Distribution in Berkeley, California, from 1998 to 2018, remaining on the company board after her retirement.)

== List of publications ==
- Two Cross Seizings. Sombre Reptiles, 1980.
- Persia. Chance Additions, 1983.
- Duse. Coincidence Press, 1987. (reprint: Paradigm Press, 2000)
- like roads. Kelsey St. Press, 1990. ISBN 0-932716-24-5
- Rondeaux. Roof Books, 1990.
- L'archiviste. Zasterle Press, 1991.
- Symmetry. Avec Books, 1996.
- Spicer's City. Poetry New York, 1998.
- The Case. O Books, 1998.
- Cunning, a short novel. Spuyten Duyvil, 1999.
- Nude Memoir. Krupskaya, 2000.
- Self-Destruction. Post-Apollo Press, 2004.
- Ultravioleta, a novel. Atelos, 2006.
- A Semblance: Selected and New Poems, 1975 - 2007. Omnidawn Publishing, 2007.
- An Air Force. Hooke Press, 2007.
- A Tonalist. Nightboat, 2010. ISBN 978-0-9822645-6-0
