= Wendell Berry =

American writer (1934–2026)

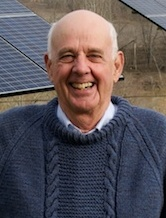
- Berry in 2011
- Born: Wendell Erdman Berry; August 5, 1934; Louisville, Kentucky, U.S.
- Died: August 31, 2026 (aged 92); Port Royal, Kentucky, U.S.
- Education: University of Kentucky (BA, MA)
- Occupations: Poet; farmer; writer; activist; academic
- Relatives: John M. Berry (brother)
- Writing career
- Genres: Fiction; poetry; essays
- Subjects: Agriculture; economy; community; rural life

Wendell Erdman Berry (August 5, 1934 – August 31, 2026) was an American novelist, poet, essayist, environmental activist, cultural critic and farmer. Closely identified with rural Kentucky, Berry developed many of his agrarian themes in the early essays of The Gift of Good Land (1981) and The Unsettling of America (1977). His attention to the culture and economy of rural communities is also found in the novels and stories of Port William, such as A Place on Earth (1967), Jayber Crow (2000), and That Distant Land (2004).

Berry was an elected member of the Fellowship of Southern Writers, a recipient of the National Humanities Medal, and delivered the Jefferson Lecture for 2012. He was also a 2013 Fellow of the American Academy of Arts and Sciences and, from 2014 to his death, a member of the American Academy of Arts and Letters. Berry was named the recipient of the 2013 Richard C. Holbrooke Distinguished Achievement Award. On January 28, 2015, he became the first living writer to be inducted into the Kentucky Writers Hall of Fame.

== Early life and career ==
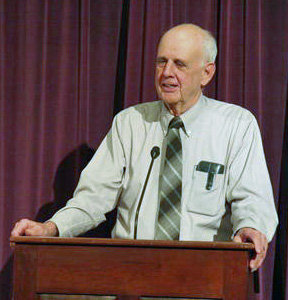
Berry in July 2011

Wendell Erdman Berry was born in Louisville, Kentucky, on August 5, 1934, to John Marshall Berry, a lawyer and tobacco farmer and Virginia Erdman Perry. The families of both parents had farmed in Henry County for at least five generations. Berry attended secondary school at Millersburg Military Institute and then earned a B.A. (1956) and M.A. (1957) in English at the University of Kentucky. In 1956, at the University of Kentucky he met another Kentucky writer-to-be, Gurney Norman. He completed his M.A. and married Tanya Amyx in 1957. In 1958, he attended Stanford University's creative writing program as a Wallace Stegner Fellow, studying under Stegner in a seminar that included Larry McMurtry, Robert Stone, Ernest Gaines, Tillie Olsen, and Ken Kesey. Berry's first novel, Nathan Coulter, was published in April 1960.

A Guggenheim Fellowship took Berry and his family to Italy and France in August 1961, where he came to know Wallace Fowlie, critic and translator of French literature. From 1962 to 1964, he taught English at New York University's University Heights campus in the Bronx. In 1964, he began teaching creative writing at the University of Kentucky, from which he resigned in 1977. During this time in Lexington, he came to know author Guy Davenport, as well as author and monk Thomas Merton and photographer Ralph Eugene Meatyard.

== Activism ==
Berry delivered "A Statement Against the War in Vietnam" during the Kentucky Conference on the War and the Draft on February 10, 1968, at the University of Kentucky in Lexington:

We seek to preserve peace by fighting a war, or to advance freedom by subsidizing dictatorships, or to 'win the hearts and minds of the people' by poisoning their crops and burning their villages and confining them in concentration camps; we seek to uphold the 'truth' of our cause with lies, or to answer conscientious dissent with threats and slurs and intimidations.... I have come to the realization that I can no longer imagine a war that I would believe to be either useful or necessary. I would be against any war.

He debated former secretary of agriculture Earl Butz at Manchester University in North Manchester, Indiana, in November 1977. In this debate Berry defended the longstanding structure of small family farms and rural communities that were being replaced by what Butz saw as the achievements of industrial agriculture. "My basic assumption when talking about agriculture is that there's more to it than just agriculture. That you can't disconnect one part of a society from all the other parts and just look at the results and that alone."

On June 3, 1979, Berry engaged in nonviolent civil disobedience against the construction of a nuclear power plant at Marble Hill, Indiana. He describes "this nearly eventless event" and expands upon his reasons for it in the essay "The Reactor and the Garden."

On February 9, 2003, Berry's essay titled "A Citizen's Response to the National Security Strategy of the United States" was published as a full-page advertisement in The New York Times. Berry opened the essay—a critique of the George W. Bush administration's post-9/11 international strategy—by asserting that "The new National Security Strategy published by the White House in September 2002, if carried out, would amount to a radical revision of the political character of our nation."

On January 4, 2009, Berry and Wes Jackson, president of The Land Institute, published an op-ed article in The New York Times titled "A 50-Year Farm Bill." In July 2009, Berry, Jackson, and Fred Kirschenmann of the Leopold Center for Sustainable Agriculture gathered in Washington, D.C. to promote this idea. Berry and Jackson wrote, "We need a 50-year farm bill that addresses forthrightly the problems of soil loss and degradation, toxic pollution, fossil-fuel dependency and the destruction of rural communities."

Also in January 2009, Berry released a statement against the death penalty, which began, "As I am made deeply uncomfortable by the taking of a human life before birth, I am also made deeply uncomfortable by the taking of a human life after birth." And in November 2009, Berry and 38 other writers from Kentucky wrote to Gov. Steve Beshear and Attorney General Jack Conway asking them to impose a moratorium on the death penalty in that state.

On March 2, 2009, Berry joined over 2,000 others in non-violently blocking the gates to a coal-fired power plant in Washington, D.C. No one was arrested.

On May 22, 2009, Berry, at a listening session in Louisville, spoke against the National Animal Identification System (NAIS). He said, "If you impose this program on the small farmers, who are already overburdened, you're going to have to send the police for me. I'm 75 years old. I've about completed my responsibilities to my family. I'll lose very little in going to jail in opposition to your program – and I'll have to do it. Because I will be, in every way that I can conceive of, a non-cooperator."

In October 2009, Berry combined with "the Berea-based Kentucky Environmental Foundation (KEF), along with several other non-profit organizations and rural electric co-op members" to petition against and protest the construction of a coal-burning power plant in Clark County, Kentucky. On February 28, 2011, the Kentucky Public Service Commission approved the cancellation of this power plant.

On December 20, 2009, due to the University of Kentucky's close association with coal interests in the state, Berry removed his papers from the university. He explained to the Lexington Herald-Leader, "I don't think the University of Kentucky can be so ostentatiously friendly to the coal industry … and still be a friend to me and the interests for which I have stood for the last 45 years. … If they love the coal industry that much, I have to cancel my friendship." In August 2012, the papers were donated to The Kentucky Historical Society in Frankfort.

On September 28, 2010, Berry participated in a rally in Louisville during an EPA hearing on how to manage coal ash. Berry said, "The EPA knows that coal ash is poison. We ask it only to believe in its own findings on this issue, and do its duty."

Berry, with 14 other protesters, spent the weekend of February 12, 2011, locked in the Kentucky governor's office to demand an end to mountaintop removal coal mining. He was part of the environmental group Kentuckians for the Commonwealth that began their sit-in on Friday and left at midday Monday to join about 1,000 others in a mass outdoor rally.

In 2011, the Berry Center was established at New Castle, Kentucky, "for the purpose of bringing focus, knowledge and cohesiveness to the work of changing our ruinous industrial agriculture system into a system and culture that uses nature as the standard, accepts no permanent damage to the ecosphere, and takes into consideration human health in local communities."

In June 2020, Berry endorsed Mike Broihier in the Democratic primary for Kentucky's 2020 U.S. Senate election.

In July 2020, Berry and his wife, Tanya Amyx Berry, sued the University of Kentucky to prevent the removal of a mural that has been criticized for being "racially offensive." The mural was commissioned in the 1930s and was done by Ann Rice O'Hanlon, a relative of Tanya Amyx Berry.

In August 2022, at a public hearing of the Henry County, Kentucky planning commission, Berry spoke against re-zoning agricultural land to allow Angel's Envy distillery to develop the property "for bourbon-barrel storage and the development of an agritourism destination." Despite the testimony by Berry and others, the planning commission granted the re-zoning request.

== Ideas ==
Berry's nonfiction serves as an extended conversation about the life he valued. According to him, the good life includes sustainable agriculture, appropriate technologies, healthy rural communities, connection to place, the pleasures of good food, animal husbandry, good work, local economics, the miracle of life, consistent life ethic, fidelity, frugality, reverence, and the interconnectedness of life. The threats Berry finds to this good simple life include: industrial farming and the industrialization of life, ignorance, hubris, greed, violence against others and against the natural world, the eroding topsoil in the United States, global economics, and environmental destruction. As a prominent defender of agrarian values, Berry's appreciation for traditional farming techniques, such as those of the Amish, grew in the 1970s, due in part to exchanges with Draft Horse Journal publisher Maurice Telleen.

Jedediah Britton-Purdy has considered many of Berry's major themes and concerns:

Over the years, he called himself an agrarian, a pacifist, and a Christian—albeit of an eccentric kind. He wrote against all forms of violence and destruction—of land, communities, and human beings—and argued that the modern American way of life is a skein of violence. He was an anti-capitalist moralist and a writer of praise for what he admires: the quiet, mostly uncelebrated labor and affection that keep the world whole and might still redeem it. He was also an acerbic critic of what he dislikes, particularly modern individualism, and his emphasis on family and marriage and his ambivalence toward abortion mark him as an outsider to the left.

The concept of "Solving for pattern", coined by Berry in his essay of the same title, is the process of finding solutions that solve multiple problems, while minimizing the creation of new problems. The essay was originally published in the Rodale, Inc. periodical The New Farm. Though Berry's use of the phrase was in direct reference to agriculture, it has since come to enjoy broader use throughout the design community.

Berry, who described himself as "a person who takes the Gospel seriously," has criticized Christian organizations for failing to challenge cultural complacency about environmental degradation, and showed a willingness to criticize what he perceived as the arrogance of some Christians. He was an advocate of Christian pacifism, as shown in his book Blessed Are the Peacemakers: Christ's Teachings About Love, Compassion and Forgiveness (2005).

Berry's core ideas, and in particular his poem "Sabbaths III, 1989 (Santa Clara Valley)," guided the 2007 documentary feature film The Unforeseen, produced by Terrence Malick and Robert Redford. In the film Berry narrates his own poem. Director Laura Dunn went on to make the 2016 documentary feature Look & See: A Portrait of Wendell Berry, again produced by Malick and Redford.

== Poetry ==
Berry's lyric poetry often appears as a contemporary eclogue, pastoral, or elegy; but he also composed dramatic and historical narratives (such as "Bringer of Water" and "July, 1773", respectively) and occasional and discursive poems ("Against the War in Vietnam" and "Some Further Words", respectively).

Berry's literary career began to gain national recognition in February 1957, when his poem "Rain Crow" was published in Poetry magazine, marking his first appearance in a national publication.

We know
The winter earth
Upon the body
Of the young
President,
And the early dark
Falling;

— Wendell Berry, November Twenty Six Nineteen Hundred Sixty Three

His first published poetry book consisted of a single poem, the elegiac November Twenty Six Nineteen Hundred Sixty Three (1964), initiated and illustrated by Ben Shahn, commemorating the death of John F. Kennedy. Its eleven stanzas are each propelled by the anaphora "We know". The elegiac here and elsewhere, according to Triggs, enables Berry to characterize the connections "that link past and future generations through their common working of the land."

The first full-length collection, The Broken Ground (1964), develops many of Berry's fundamental concerns: "the cycle of life and death, responsiveness to place, pastoral subject matter, and recurring images of the Kentucky River and the hill farms of north-central Kentucky."

According to Andrew Angyal, "There is little modernist formalism or postmodernist experimentation in [Berry's] verse." A commitment to the reality and primacy of the actual world stands behind these two rejections. In "Notes: Unspecializing Poetry," Berry writes, "Devotion to order that is not poetical prevents the specialization of poetry." He goes on to note, "Nothing exists for its own sake, but for a harmony greater than itself which includes it. A work of art, which accepts this condition, and exists upon its terms, honors the Creation, and so becomes a part of it."

Lionel Basney placed Berry's poetry within a tradition of didactic poetry that stretches back to Horace: "To say that Berry's poetry can be didactic, then, means that it envisions a specific wisdom, and also the traditional sense of art and culture that gives art the task of teaching this wisdom."

For Berry, poetry existed "at the center of a complex reminding" Both the poet and the reader are reminded of the poem's crafted language, of the poem's formal literary antecedents, of "what is remembered or ought to be remembered," and of "the formal integrity of other works, creatures and structures of the world."

=== Sabbath poems ===
The bell calls in the town
Where forebears cleared the shaded land
And brought high daylight down
To shine on field and trodden road.
I hear, but understand
Contrarily, and walk into the woods.
I leave labor and load,
Take up a different story.
I keep an inventory
Of wonders and of uncommercial goods

— Wendell Berry, This Day: Collected & New Sabbath Poems

From 1979, Berry wrote what he called "Sabbath poems". They were first collected in A Timbered Choir: The Sabbath Poems 1979–1997. This was followed by Sabbaths from 1998 to 2004 in Given: New Poems; and those from 2005 to 2008 are in Leavings. All Sabbath poems until 2012 are published in This Day: New and Collected Sabbath Poems 1979 – 2012. Sabbaths 2013 is published by Larkspur Press. A Small Porch contains nine Sabbath poems from 2014 and sixteen from 2015. One Sabbath poem, "What Passes, What Remains" (VIII from 2016), is published as the epilogue in The Art of Loading Brush. That poem, along with fourteen others, can also be found in Sabbaths 2016, published by Larkspur Press. In 2024 Berry published Another Day: Sabbath Poems, 2013–2023.

The poems are motivated by Berry's longtime habit of walking out onto the land on Sunday mornings. As he puts it, "I go free from the tasks and intentions of my workdays, and so my mind becomes hospitable to unintended thoughts: to what I am very willing to call inspiration."

The Sabbath poems have been described as "written from a particular place and on particular Sabbaths, and so should be read as part of a spiritual practice and as poems, in some sense, devoted to dwelling, to living thoughtfully in one place." Oehlschlaeger links Berry's project to a key observation by Henry David Thoreau,

As Thoreau continues in "Life Without Principle," he notes the constant busyness of Americans, so engaged in "infinite bustle" that "there is no sabbath." And he notes later that "there is nothing, not even crime, more opposed to poetry, to philosophy, ay, to life itself, than this incessant business." The logic is clear: destruction of the Sabbath is contrary to "life itself." That, I suggest, is the context in which we should read the Sabbath poems that Berry has been writing for nearly the last thirty years.

== Fiction ==
Berry's fiction consists of nine novels and fifty-eight short stories—all of which are collected in That Distant Land (2004), A Place in Time (2012) and How It Went (2022)—and one verse drama which, when read as a whole, form a chronicle of the fictional small Kentucky town of Port William. Because of his long-term, ongoing exploration of the life of an imagined place, Berry has been compared to William Faulkner. Yet, although Port William is no stranger to murder, suicide, alcoholism, marital discord, and the full range of losses that touch human lives, it lacks the extremes of characterization and plot development that are found in much of Faulkner. Hence Berry was sometimes described as working in an idealized, pastoral, or nostalgic mode, a characterization of his work which he resists: "If your work includes a criticism of history, which mine certainly does, you can't be accused of wanting to go back to something, because you're saying that what we were wasn't good enough."

The effect of profound shifts in the agricultural practices of the United States and the disappearance of traditional agrarian life are two of the major concerns of the Port William fiction, though these themes are often only a background or subtext to the stories themselves. The Port William fiction attempts to portray, on a local scale, what "a human economy … conducted with reverence" looked like in the past—and what civic, domestic, and personal virtues might be elicited by such an economy, were it pursued today. Social as well as seasonal changes mark the passage of time. The Port William stories allow Berry to explore the human dimensions of the decline of the family farm and farm community under the influence of expanding post-World War II agribusiness. But these works rarely fall into simple didacticism, and are never merely tales of decline. Each is grounded in a realistic depiction of character and community. In A Place on Earth (1967), for example, farmer Mat Feltner comes to terms with the loss of his only son, Virgil. In the course of the novel, we see how not only Mat but the entire community wrestles with the acute costs of World War II.

Berry's fiction allowed him to explore the literal and metaphorical implications of marriage as that which binds individuals, families, and communities to each other, and to Nature itself. Yet not all of Port William is happily or conventionally married. "Old Jack" Beechum struggles with significant incompatibilities with his wife, and with a brief yet fulfilling extramarital affair. The barber Jayber Crow lives with a forlorn, secret, and unrequited love for a woman he believes himself "mentally" married to, though she knows nothing about it. Burley Coulter never formalizes his bond with Kate Helen Branch, the mother of his son. Yet, each of these men finds himself firmly bound up in the community, the "membership," of Port William.

Of his fictional project, Berry wrote: "I have made the imagined town of Port William, its neighborhood and membership, in an attempt to honor the actual place where I have lived. By means of the imagined place, over the last fifty years, I have learned to see my native landscape and neighborhood as a place unique in the world, a work of God, possessed of an inherent sanctity that mocks any human valuation that can be put upon it." Elsewhere, Berry has said, "The only thing I try to accomplish in fiction is to show how people act when they love each other."

In January 2018, the Library of America published a volume of Berry's fiction—the first of a projected four volumes of his writing. Wendell Berry: Port William Novels & Stories (The Civil War to World War II) contains four novels and twenty-three short stories in chronological order according to the stories' events. Berry was one of very few living writers featured in the Library of America catalog.

=== Nathan Coulter (1960) ===
In Berry's first novel, young Nathan "comes of age" through dealing with the death of his mother, the depression of his father, Jarrat, the rugged companionship of his brother Tom, and the mischief of his uncle Burley. Kirkus Review concludes, "A sensitive adolescent theme is handled rather poetically, but so uniform in tone that no drama is generated and no sense of time passing is felt." John Ditsky finds William Faulkner's influence in Nathan Coulter, but notes, "Not only does the work avoid the pitfalls encountered by Faulkner's initial attempts to escape his postage stamp of native soil, but Nathan Coulter also seems a wise attempt to get that autobiographical first novel out of one's system, and to do so [with] honesty."

=== A Place on Earth (1967) ===
Set in the critical year of 1945, this novel focuses on farmer Mat Feltner's struggle over the news that his son Virgil has been listed as missing in action while also telling multiple tales of the lives of other Port William residents, such as Burley Coulter, Jack Beechum, Ernest Finley, Ida and Gideon Crop. Reprinting by North Point Press in 1983 allowed Berry to radically revise the novel, removing almost a third of its original length. Jeffrey Bilbro believes that these substantial changes marked growth in Berry's approach. "In Berry's revised edition, his technique caught up with his subject. He allows us, as readers, to participate in the ignorance of his characters, and in doing so, we may be able to understand more fully the painful difficulty of choosing fidelity to the natural order while living in the midst of mystery."

=== The Memory of Old Jack (1974) ===
This third novel of Port William begins with Jack Beechum as a very old man in 1952 and continues back into his youth and maturity to uncover his life and work as a dedicated farmer, conflicted husband, and living link to past generations. The story ranges from the Civil War to just past World War II. Josh Hurst comments on Berry's ability to avoid certain narrative pitfalls, "Jack's story could be presented us either as heroic ballad or as cautionary [tale]—and there is much in his life to support both admiration and gentle tisk-tisking—but the gift of this book is how it allows a man's memories to wash over us as though unshaped by narrative or conscious editorializing."

=== Remembering (1988) ===
In Berry's fourth novel, an adult Andy Catlett wanders through San Francisco remembering, but feeling alienated from, his native Port William. He struggles to come to terms with himself, his marriage, his farm, and the distorted values of American society. Of Berry's vision here, Charles Solomon writes, "Wendell Berry contrasts modern American agribusiness—which he depicts as an artificial conglomeration of sterile flow charts, debts and mechanization—with the older ideal of farming as a nurturing way of life." But along these lines, Bruce Bawer finds a problem with the novel, "Here, for the first time in a Port William novel, Berry seems more interested in communicating opinions than in portraying sympathetic characters in plausible situations; the opening episode, set at a conference on agricultural policy, paints the ideological conflict between Andy and his adversaries in broad, unsubtle strokes."

=== A World Lost (1996) ===
Young Andy Catlett's uncle Andrew had been murdered back in 1944, and now an adult Andy is reconstructing the event and its aftermath. "Looking back with a mixture of a young boy's incomprehension and an older man's nostalgia, Andy evokes the past not as a narrative but as a series of disembodied fragments in the flow of time." In this fifth novel of Port William, Berry considers the violence of men and its impact on the family and community that must come to terms with it. "Berry shows us the psychic costs of misplaced family pride and social rigidity, and yet he also celebrates the benevolent blessing of familial love. This is simple, soul-satisfying storytelling, augmented by understated humor and quiet insight."

=== Jayber Crow (2000) ===
Port William's barber recounts his life's journey in Berry's sixth novel. Jayber's early life as an orphan near Port William is followed by studies towards a possible vocation to Church ministry. A questioning mind, however, sends him in other directions until he finds himself back in Port William with an ever-growing commitment to that place and its people. As Publishers Weekly notes, "Crow's life, which begins as WWI is about to erupt, is emblematic of a century of upheaval, and Berry's anecdotal and episodic tale sounds a challenge to contemporary notions of progress. It is to Berry's credit that a novel so freighted with ideas and ideology manages to project such warmth and luminosity."

=== Hannah Coulter (2004) ===
Berry's seventh novel presents a concise vision of Port William's "membership". The story encompasses Hannah's life, including the Great Depression, World War II, the postwar industrialization of agriculture, the flight of youth to urban employment, and the consequent remoteness of grandchildren. The tale is told in the voice of an old woman twice widowed, who has experienced much loss yet has never been defeated. Somehow, lying at the center of her strength is the "membership"—the fact that people care for each other and, even in absence, hold each other in a kind of presence. All in all, Hannah Coulter embodies many of the themes of Berry's Port William saga.

=== Andy Catlett: Early Travels (2006) ===
Andy Catlett, age nine, makes his first solo journey to visit with both sets of grandparents in Port William. The New York Times reviewer notes, "What the grown-up Andy recalls of that experience is transformed into 'a sort of homage' to a now-vanished world. Title characters from Berry's earlier Port William volumes — Jayber Crow, Old Jack, Hannah Coulter — appear here in affectionate cameos as the adult Andy, echoing Wordsworth, observes that 'in my memory, all who were there ... seem now to be gathered into a love that is at once a boy's and an aging man's.'"

=== Marce Catlett: The Force of a Story (2026) ===
Berry’s final novel, published just before his death, is a story grounded in fact, as Berry told it in his 2012 Jefferson Lecture in the Humanities, ''It All Turns On Affection''. In the novel, Marce Catlett, father of Wheeler and grandfather of Andy, brings a tobacco crop to market, but after paying off storage and other fees he returns home with no profit for a year's labor. The story then explores Wheeler's and Andy's lives in the light of that original calamity.

Some readers responded to the book's "paean to a distant way of life" and its "seminal role both in the fictional world of Port William and in Berry’s own family history". Sam Sachs finds in it an alternate understanding of national identity, "a vision of Americanness that eschews the familiar values of progress, mobility and power." Others found it more didactic than entertaining, "a rhetorical exercise lobbying for a particular politics"

Eric Miller notes that "Marce Catlett’s story remains for any who wish to claim it: a story of historic injustice—the 'unwillingness to pay farmers for their work or the land for its yield'—and the structurally effective means by which it was, for a time, combated."

== Personal life and death ==
On July 4, 1965, Berry, his wife, and his two children moved to Lane's Landing, a 12-acre farm (4.9 ha) that he had purchased, and began growing corn and small grains on what eventually became a homestead of about 117 acres (47 ha). They bought their first flock of seven Border Cheviot sheep in 1978. Lane's Landing is in Henry County in north central Kentucky near Port Royal, and his parents' birthplaces, and is on the western bank of the Kentucky River, not far from where it flows into the Ohio River. Berry farmed, resided, and wrote at Lane's Landing for the rest of his life. He wrote about his early experiences on the land and about his decision to return to it in essays such as "The Long-Legged House" and "A Native Hill".

From 1977 until 1980, he edited and wrote for Rodale, Inc. in Emmaus, Pennsylvania, including for its publications Organic Gardening and Farming and The New Farm. From 1987 to 1993, he returned to the English Department of the University of Kentucky. Berry wrote at least twenty-five books (or chapbooks) of poems, twenty-four volumes of essays, and fifteen novels and short story collections.

Berry died in Port Royal, Kentucky, on August 31, 2026, at the age of 92. Following his death, The New York Times noted that Berry's works had "extolled America’s agrarian past" and that his efforts "championed small family farms and the environment". Governor of Kentucky Andy Beshear called Berry a "literary giant and a great Kentuckian".

== Awards ==
| Award | Year | Granting institution | Notes |
|---|---|---|---|
| Wallace Stegner Fellowship | 1958 | Stanford University | |
| Guggenheim Fellowship | 1961 | John Simon Guggenheim Memorial Foundation | |
| Rockefeller Fellowship | 1965 | The Rockefeller Foundation | |
| Arts and Letters Award | 1971 | American Academy of Arts and Letters | |
| UK Libraries Medallion for Intellectual Achievement | 1993 | University of Kentucky Libraries | |
| Aiken Taylor Award for Modern American Poetry | 1994 | The Sewanee Review and the University of the South | |
| Thomas Merton Award | 1999 | Thomas Merton Center for Peace and Social Justice | |
| Poets' Prize | 2000 | Nicholas Roerich Museum | |
| Lifetime Achievement Award | 2003 | Festival of Faiths in Louisville Kentucky | |
| Kentuckian of the Year | 2005 | Kentucky Monthly | |
| Art of Fact Award | 2006 | SUNY Brockport Writers Forum and M&T Bank | |
| Premio Artusi | 2008 | La Città di Forlimpopoli | |
| The Cleanth Brooks Medal for Lifetime Achievement | 2009 | Fellowship of Southern Writers | |
| The Louis Bromfield Society Award | 2009 | Malabar Farm Foundation and Ohio Department of Natural Resources | |
| The National Humanities Medal | 2010 | National Endowment for the Humanities | |
| The 41st Jefferson Lecture in the Humanities | 2012 | National Endowment for the Humanities | |
| The Peggy V. Helmerich Distinguished Author Award | 2012 | Tulsa Library Trust | |
| Russell Kirk Paideia Prize | 2012 | Circe Institute | |
| Fellow of the American Academy of Arts and Sciences | 2013 | American Academy of Arts and Sciences | |
| The Roosevelt Institute's Freedom Medal | 2013 | The Roosevelt Institute | |
| The Richard C. Holbrooke Distinguished Achievement Award | 2013 | Dayton Literary Peace Prize | |
| The Martin E. Marty Award for the Public Understanding of Religion | 2013 | American Academy of Religion | |
| The Allen Tate Poetry Prize | 2014 | The Sewanee Review | |
| The Dean's Cross for Servant Leadership in Church and Society | 2014 | Virginia Theological Seminary | |
| Kentucky Writers Hall of Fame | 2015 | The Carnegie Center for Literacy and Learning | |
| Ivan Sandrof Lifetime Achievement Award | 2016 | National Book Critics Circle | |
| The Sidney Lanier Prize (now The Thomas Robinson Prize) | 2016 | Center for Southern Studies at Mercer University | |
| IACP Trailblazer | 2017 | International Association of Culinary Professionals | |
| Kentucky Humanities Carl West Literary Award | 2019 | Kentucky Humanities Council | |
| Founders Award | 2022 | Celebration of Benjamin Franklin, Founder | |
| Henry Hope Reed Award | 2022 | University of Notre Dame School of Architecture | |

== Works ==
=== Fiction ===
| Title | Year | Publisher | Reprinted/revised | ISBN | Notes |
|---|---|---|---|---|---|
| Nathan Coulter | 1960 | Houghton Mifflin, Boston | North Point (1985), Counterpoint (2008) | 1582434093 | Also in Three Short Novels, 2002. Heavily revised in 1985, including the removal of the last four chapters. |
| A Place on Earth | 1967 | Harcourt, Brace & World, New York | Avon (1969), North Point (1983), Counterpoint (2001) | 1582431248 | Heavily revised in 1983 |
| The Memory of Old Jack | 1974 | Harcourt, Brace & Jovanovich, New York | Counterpoint (1999) | 1582430438 | |
| The Wild Birds: Six Stories of the Port William Membership | 1986 | North Point, San Francisco | Counterpoint (2019) | 0865472165 | Also in That Distant Land: The Collected Stories, 2004 |
| Remembering | 1988 | North Point, San Francisco | Counterpoint (2008) | 1582434158 | Also in Three Short Novels, 2002 |
| Fidelity: Five Stories | 1992 | Pantheon, New York | Counterpoint (2018) | 0679748318 | Also in That Distant Land: The Collected Stories, 2004 |
| Watch With Me and Six Other Stories of the Yet-Remembered Ptolemy Proudfoot and His Wife, Miss Minnie, Née Quinch | 1994 | Pantheon, New York | Counterpoint (2018) | 0679758542 | Also in That Distant Land: The Collected Stories, 2004 |
| A World Lost | 1996 | Counterpoint, Washington, DC | | 1582434182 | Also in Three Short Novels, 2002 |
| Jayber Crow | 2000 | Counterpoint, Washington, DC | | 1582431604 | |
| Three Short Novels (Nathan Coulter, Remembering, A World Lost) | 2002 | Counterpoint, Washington, DC | | 1582431787 | |
| Hannah Coulter | 2004 | Shoemaker & Hoard, Washington, DC | Counterpoint, Berkeley (2007) | 1593760361 | In 2007 Shoemaker & Hoard became part of Counterpoint LLC, Berkeley, CA. |
| That Distant Land: The Collected Stories | 2004 | Shoemaker & Hoard, Washington, DC | Counterpoint, Berkeley (2007) | 159376054X | In 2007 Shoemaker & Hoard became part of Counterpoint LLC, Berkeley, CA. |
| Andy Catlett: Early Travels | 2006 | Shoemaker & Hoard, Washington, DC | Counterpoint, Berkeley (2007) | 1593761643 | In 2007 Shoemaker & Hoard became part of Counterpoint LLC, Berkeley, CA. |
| Whitefoot: A Story from the Center of the World | 2009 | Counterpoint, Berkeley | | 1582436401 | Available online as "Whitefoot", Orion Magazine. January/February 2007. |
| A Place in Time: Twenty Stories of the Port William Membership | 2012 | Counterpoint, Berkeley | | 1619021889 | |
| The Art of Loading Brush: New Agrarian Writings | 2017 | Counterpoint, Berkeley | | 1619020386 | Preface by Maurice Telleen; three essays (plus a substantial introduction); four short stories; one poem |
| Wendell Berry: Port William Novels & Stories, The Civil War to World War II | 2018 | Library of America, New York | | 1598535544 | Edited by Jack Shoemaker; twenty-three stories and four novels |
| Stand By Me | 2019 | Allen Lane/Penguin | | 0241388619 | aka Down in the Valley Where the Green Grass Grows, collected short stories as published in the UK |
| How It Went: Thirteen More Stories of the Port William Membership | 2022 | Counterpoint, Berkeley | | 9781640095816 | Thirteen new stories of the Port William membership spanning the decades from World War II to the present |
| Wendell Berry: Port William Novels & Stories, The Postwar Years | 2024 | Library of America, New York | | 9781598537765 | Edited by Jack Shoemaker; twenty-three stories and two novels |
| Marce Catlett: The Force of a Story | 2025 | Counterpoint, California | | 9781640097759 | |

==== Uncollected short stories ====
- "Nothing Living Lives Alone". The Threepenny Review. Spring 2011. PEN/O. Henry Prize Story, 2012
- "The Stackpole Legend". The Threepenny Review. Spring 2024.

=== Nonfiction ===
| Title | Year | Publisher | Reprinted/revised | ISBN | Notes |
|---|---|---|---|---|---|
| The Long-Legged House | 1969 | Harcourt, Brace, Jovanovich; New York | Shoemaker & Hoard (2004), Counterpoint (2012) | 1619020017 (2012) | |
| The Hidden Wound | 1970 | Houghton Mifflin | Counterpoint (2010) | 1582434867 | |
| The Unforeseen Wilderness: Kentucky's Red River Gorge | 1971 | University Press of Kentucky; Lexington | North Point (1991), Shoemaker & Hoard (2006) | 1593760922 | Photographs by Ralph Eugene Meatyard |
| A Continuous Harmony: Essays Cultural & Agricultural | 1972 | Harcourt, Brace; New York | Shoemaker & Hoard (2004), Counterpoint (2012) | 1593760922 | |
| The Unsettling of America: Culture and Agriculture | 1977 | Sierra Club, San Francisco | Avon Books (1978), Sierra Club/Counterpoint (third edition, 1996) | 0871568772 | |
| The Gift of Good Land: Further Essays Cultural and Agricultural | 1981 | North Point, San Francisco | Counterpoint (2009) | 1582434840 | |
| Recollected Essays: 1965–1980 | 1981 | North Point, San Francisco | | 086547026X | |
| Standing by Words | 1983 | North Point, San Francisco | Shoemaker & Hoard (2005), Counterpoint (2011) | 1582437459 | |
| Meeting the Expectations of the Land: Essays in Sustainable Agriculture and Stewardship | 1986 | North Point, San Francisco | | 086547172X | Editor with Wes Jackson and Bruce Colman |
| Home Economics: Fourteen Essays | 1987 | North Point, San Francisco | Counterpoint (2009) | 1582434859 | |
| Harlan Hubbard: Life and Work | 1990 | University Press of Kentucky | | 0813109426 | |
| What Are People For? | 1990 | North Point, San Francisco | Counterpoint (2010) | 1582434875 | |
| Standing on Earth: Selected Essays | 1991 | Golgonooza Press, UK | | 0903880466 | |
| Sex, Economy, Freedom & Community | 1992 | Pantheon, New York | | 0679756515 | |
| Another Turn of the Crank | 1996 | Counterpoint, Washington, DC | | 1887178287 | |
| Grace: Photographs of Rural America | 2000 | Safe Harbor Books, New London, NH | | 0966579836 | Photographs by Gregory Spaid, essay by Gene Logsdon, story by Wendell Berry |
| Life Is a Miracle | 2000 | Counterpoint, Washington, DC | | 1582431418 | |
| In the Presence of Fear: Three Essays for a Changed World | 2001 | Orion, Great Barrington, MA | | 0913098604 | |
| The Art of the Commonplace: The Agrarian Essays of Wendell Berry | 2002 | Counterpoint, Washington, DC | | 1582431469 | |
| Citizens Dissent: Security, Morality, and Leadership in an Age of Terror | 2003 | Orion, Great Barrington, MA | | 0913098620 | With David James Duncan, foreword by Laurie Lane-Zucker |
| Citizenship Papers | 2003 | Shoemaker & Hoard, Washington, DC | Counterpoint (2014) | 1619024470 | |
| Tobacco Harvest: An Elegy | 2004 | University Press of Kentucky, Lexington, KY | | 0813123275 | Photographs by James Baker Hall |
| Blessed Are the Peacemakers: Christ's Teachings about Love, Compassion & Forgiveness | 2005 | Shoemaker & Hoard, Washington, DC | | 1593761007 | |
| The Way of Ignorance and Other Essays | 2005 | Shoemaker & Hoard | Counterpoint (2006) | 1593761198 | |
| Bringing It to the Table: On Farming and Food | 2009 | Counterpoint, Berkeley | | 158243543X | |
| Imagination in Place | 2010 | Counterpoint, Berkeley | | 1582437068 | |
| What Matters? Economics for a Renewed Commonwealth | 2010 | Counterpoint, Berkeley | | 1582436061 | |
| The Poetry of William Carlos Williams of Rutherford | 2011 | Counterpoint, Berkeley | | 1582437149 | |
| It All Turns on Affection: The Jefferson Lecture and Other Essays | 2012 | Counterpoint, Berkeley | | 1619021145 | |
| Distant Neighbors: The Selected Letters of Wendell Berry and Gary Snyder | 2014 | Counterpoint, Berkeley | | 1619023059 | |
| Our Only World: Ten Essays | 2015 | Counterpoint, Berkeley | | 1619024888 | |
| The Art of Loading Brush: New Agrarian Writings | 2017 | Counterpoint, Berkeley | | 1619020386 | Preface by Maurice Telleen; three essays (plus a substantial introduction); four short stories; one poem |
| The World-Ending Fire: The Essential Wendell Berry | 2018 | Counterpoint, Berkeley | | 1640090282 | Thirty-one essays selected and introduced by Paul Kingsnorth; first published in 2017 in the UK by Allen Lane, an imprint of Penguin Books |
| Wendell Berry: Essays 1969–1990 | 2019 | Library of America, New York | | 1598536060 | The Unsettling of America and thirty-two essays selected by Jack Shoemaker |
| Wendell Berry: Essays 1993–2017 | 2019 | Library of America, New York | | 1598536087 | Life Is A Miracle and forty-two essays selected by Jack Shoemaker |
| The Need to Be Whole: Patriotism and the History of Prejudice | 2022 | Shoemaker & Company | | 9798985679809 | |
| Dispatches from Rural America: Sixteen Essays | 2026 | Counterpoint, Berkeley | | 9781640098572 | |

==== Uncollected essays ====
- "Against the Death Penalty" on YouTube "KCADP's YouTube Channel." April 24, 2009.
- Berry, Wendell (February 22, 2010). "The Cost of Displacement". The Progressive.
- "To Break The Silence" Appalachian Heritage Vol 41 (3), Summer 2013, pp 78–84.

=== Selected poetry ===
| Title | Year | Publisher | Reprinted/revised | ISBN | Notes |
|---|---|---|---|---|---|
| Openings | 1968 | Harcourt Brace & World, New York | | 0156700123 | |
| Farming: A Hand Book | 1970 | Harcourt Brace Jovanovich, New York | Counterpoint, Berkeley (2011) | 1582437637 | |
| The Country of Marriage | 1973 | Harcourt Brace Jovanovich, New York | Counterpoint, Berkeley (2013) | 1619021080 | |
| Sayings and Doings | 1974 | Gnomon, Lexington, KY | | 0917788036 | |
| Clearing | 1977 | Harcourt Brace Jovanovich, New York | | 0151181500 | |
| A Part | 1980 | North Point, San Francisco | | 0865470081 | |
| The Wheel | 1982 | North Point, San Francisco | | 0865470782 | |
| The Collected Poems: 1957–1982 | 1985 | North Point, San Francisco | | 0865471975 | |
| Sabbaths: Poems | 1987 | North Point, San Francisco | | 0865472904 | |
| Traveling at Home | 1988 | The Press of Appletree Alley, Lewisburg PA | North Point (1989) | 1582437645 | |
| Entries | 1994 | Pantheon, New York | Counterpoint, Washington DC (1997) | 1887178376 | |
| A Timbered Choir: The Sabbath Poems 1979–1997 | 1998 | Counterpoint, Washington DC | | 1582430063 | Later included in This Day: Sabbath Poems Collected and New 1979–2013 |
| The Selected Poems of Wendell Berry | 1999 | Counterpoint, Washington DC | | 1582430373 | |
| Given: New Poems | 2005 | Shoemaker & Hoard, Washington DC | Counterpoint, Berkeley (2006) | 1593760612 | Partially included in This Day: Sabbath Poems Collected and New 1979–2013 |
| Window Poems | 2007 | Shoemaker & Hoard, Washington DC | | 1582436231 | Originally published in Openings (1968). In 2003 a limited edition of 100 copies was published by Press on Scroll Road, Carrollton OH, signed by Wendell Berry, illustrator Wesley Bates, and James Baker Hall (author of the foreword). |
| The Mad Farmer Poems | 2008 | Counterpoint, Berkeley | | 161902277X | Originally published in Farming: A Handbook, The Country of Marriage, A Part, and Entries |
| Leavings | 2010 | Counterpoint, Berkeley | | 158243624X | Partially included in This Day: Sabbath Poems Collected and New 1979–2013 |
| New Collected Poems | 2012 | Counterpoint, Berkeley | | 1582438153 | |
| This Day: Sabbath Poems Collected and New 1979–2013 | 2013 | Counterpoint, Berkeley | | 1619021986 | |
| Terrapin and Other Poems | 2014 | Counterpoint, Berkeley | | 161902425X | Illustrated by Tom Pohrt |
| A Small Porch | 2016 | Counterpoint, Berkeley | | 1619026162 | Sabbath Poems 2014 and 2015 together with "The Presence of Nature in the Natural World: A Long Conversation" (also later included in The Art of Loading Brush) |
| Roots to the Earth | 2016 | Counterpoint, Berkeley | | 1619027800 | Eight previously published poems and one then-uncollected short story ("The Branch Way of Doing"), accompanied by wood engravings by Wesley Bates. This is the trade edition (with the added short story and engravings) of the 2014 Larkspur Press edition, based on the 1995 West Meadow Press portfolio. |
| Another Day: Sabbath Poems, 2013–2023 | 2024 | Counterpoint, Los Angeles | | 1640096394 | |

=== Interviews ===
- Weinreb, Mindy. "A Question a Day: A Written Conversation with Wendell Berry" in Merchant, 1991
- Minick, Jim. "A Citizen and a Native: An Interview with Wendell Berry" Appalachian Journal, Vol. 31, Nos 3–4, (Spring-Summer, 2004)
- Berger, Rose Marie. "Wendell Berry interview complete text," Sojourner's Magazine, July 2004
- Brockman, Holly. "How can a family 'live at the center of its own attention?' Wendell Berry's thoughts on the good life", January/February 2006
- Grubbs, Morris Allen (Editor). Conversations with Wendell Berry, University Press of Mississippi, 2007. ISBN 1578069920
- "Wendell Berry: A conversation," The Diane Rehm Show. WAMU 88.5 American University Radio, November 30, 2009.
- "Wendell Berry: Poet & Prophet," Moyers & Company. PBS. October 4, 2013.
- Lehrer, Brian. The Brian Lehrer Show WYNC, October 17, 2013
- "Distant Neighbors: Wendell Berry & Gary Snyder", part of 2014 Festival of Faiths: Sacred Earth / Sacred Self
- "Wendell Berry, Burkean" Interview with Gracy Olmstead. The American Conservative, February 17, 2015.
- "Going Home with Wendell Berry." Petrusich, Amanda. The New Yorker. July 2019.
- Fisher-Smith, Jordan. "Field Observations: An Interview with Wendell Berry"
- DeChristopher, Tim. "To Live and Love with a Dying World: A Conversation Between Tim DeCristopher and Wendell Berry". Orion, Spring 2020.
- "2022 Kentucky Book Festival: Crystal Wilkinson in conversation with Wendell Berry."

=== Forewords, introductions, prefaces, and afterwords ===
| Title | Author | Year | Publisher | ISBN |
|---|---|---|---|---|
| Aldo Leopold: His Life and Work | Meine, Curt D. | 2010 | University of Wisconsin Press | 9780299249045 |
| At Nature's Pace: Farming and the American Dream | Logsdon, Gene | 1994 | Pantheon | 9780679427414 |
| Wendell Berry and Higher Education: Cultivating Virtues of Place | Baker, Jack R. and Jeffrey Bilbro | 2017 | University Press of Kentucky | 978081316902 |
| The Caudills of the Cumberlands: Anne's Story of Life with Harry | Cummins, Terry | 2013 | Butler Books | 9781935497684 |
| Driftwood Valley: A Woman Naturalist in the Northern Wilderness | Stanwell-Fletcher, Theodora C. | 1999 | Oregon State University Press | 9780870715242 |
| Enduring Seeds: Native American Agriculture and Wild Plant Conservation | Nabhan, Gary Paul | 2002 | University of Arizona Press | 9780816522590 |
| God and Work: Aspects of Art and Tradition | Keeble, Brian | 2009 | World Wisdom Books | 9781933316680 |
| Great Possessions: An Amish Farmer's Journal | Kline, David | 2001 | The Wooster Book Company | 9781888683226 |
| A Holy Tradition of Working: Passages From the Writings of Eric Gill | Gill, Eric | 2021 | Angelico Press | 9781621386827 |
| The Holy Earth | Bailey, Liberty Hyde | 2015 | Counterpoint | 9781619025875 |
| Hope Beneath Our Feet: Restoring Our Place in the Natural World | Keogh, Martin (ed.) | 2010 | North Atlantic Books | 9781556439193 |
| James Archambeault's Historic Kentucky | Archambeault, James | 2006 | University Press of Kentucky | 9780813124209 |
| Kentucky's Natural Heritage: An Illustrated Guide to Biodiversity | Abernathy, Greg (ed.) | 2010 | University Press of Kentucky | 9780813125756 |
| Letter to a Young Farmer: How to Live Richly without Wealth on the New Garden Farm | Logsdon, Gene | 2017 | Chelsea Green Pub. | 9781603587259 |
| Letters from Larksong: An Amish Naturalist Explores His Organic Farm | Kline, David | 2010 | Wooster Book Co. | 9781590982013 |
| Living the Sabbath: Discovering the Rhythms of Rest and Delight | Wirzba, Norman | 2006 | Brazos Press | 9781587431654 |
| Lost Mountain: A Year in the Vanishing Wilderness | Reece, Erik | 2006 | Riverbed | 9781594482366 |
| The Man Who Created Paradise | Logsdon, Gene | 2001 | Ohio University Press | 9780821414071 |
| The Meat You Eat: How Corporate Farming Has Endangered America's Food Supply | Midriff, Ken | 2005 | St. Martin's Griffin | 9780312325367 |
| Missing Mountains | Johansen, Kristin (ed.) | 2005 | Wind Publications | 9781893239494 |
| My Mercy Encompasses All: The Koran's Teachings on Compassion, Peace and Love | Shah-Kazemi, Reza | 2007 | Counterpoint | 9781593761448 |
| Nature as Measure: The Selected Essays of Wes Jackson | Jackson, Wes | 2011 | Counterpoint | 9781582437002 |
| The One-Straw Revolution | Fukuoka, Masanobu | 2009 | NYRB Classics | 9781590173138 |
| The Pattern of a Man & Other Stories | Still, James | 2001 | Gnomon Press | 9780917788758 |
| Pedestrian Photographs | Merrill, Larry | 2008 | University of Rochester Press | 9781580462907 |
| The Prince's Speech: On the Future of Food | HRH The Prince of Wales | 2012 | Rodale, Inc. | 9781609614713 |
| Ralph Eugene Meatyard | Gassan, Arnold | 1970 | Gnomon Press | ASIN: B001GECZNY |
| Round of a Country Year: A Farmer's Day Book | Kline, David | 2017 | Counterpoint | 9781619029248 |
| Scripture, Culture, and Agriculture: An Agrarian Reading of the Bible | Davis, Ellen F. | 2008 | Cambridge University Press | 9780521732239 |
| Soil And Health: A Study of Organic Agriculture | Howard, Albert | 2007 | University Press of Kentucky | 9780813191713 |
| Stone Walls: Personal Boundaries | Cook, Mariana | 2011 | Damiani | 9788862081696 |
| That Wondrous Pattern: Essays on Poetry and Poets | Raine, Kathleen | 2017 | Counterpoint | 9781619029231 |
| The Embattled Wilderness: The Natural and Human History of the Robinson Forest and the Fight for Its Future | Reece, Erik and James J. Krupka | 2013 | University of Georgia Press | 9780820341231 |
| The Toilet Papers: Recycling Waste and Conserving Water | Van der Ryn, Sim | 1978 | Ecological Design Press | 9781890132583 |
| To a Young Writer | Stegner, Wallace | 2009 | Red Butte Press | 9780874809985 |
| Tree Crops: A Permanent Agriculture | Smith, J. Russell | 1987 | Island Press | 9780933280441 |
| Waste Land: Meditations on a Ravaged Landscape | Hanson, David T. | 1997 | Aperture | 9780893817268 |
| We All Live Downstream: Writings About Mountaintop Removal | Howard, Jason | 2009 | MotesBooks | 9781934894071 |
| The Woodcuts of Harlan Hubbard | Hubbard, Harlan | 1994 | University Press of Kentucky | 9780813118796 |
| Of the Land and the Spirit: The Essential Lord Northbourne on Ecology and Religion | Christopher James; Joseph A. Fitzgerald, eds. | 2008 | World Wisdom | 9781933316611 |

=== Musical settings and responses ===
| Title | Composer | Year | Performer | Notes/sources |
|---|---|---|---|---|
| Celebrating Wendell Berry in Music, Vol. 1 | Andrew Maxfield and Wendell Berry | 2013 | Salt Lake Vocal Artists | Disc 1 contains ten poems read by Wendell Berry and then sung. Out of print. |
| Celebrating Wendell Berry in Music, Vol 1 | Eric Bibb | 2013 | Eric Bibb | Disc 2 contains fifteen songs for solo voice and one instrumental. Out of print. |
| Celebrating Wendell Berry in Music, Vol 2: All the Earth Shall Sing | Andrew Maxfield | 2016 | Salt Lake Vocal Artists and Wendell Berry | This one-volume edition contains ten more poems and songs. Now out of print. A selection |
| Celebrating Wendell Berry in Music | Andrew Maxfield | 2017 | Salt Lake Vocal Artists and Wendell Berry | This edition republishes Maxfield/Berry pieces from the earlier, now out of print, volumes. |
| A Native Hill | Gavin Bryars | 2019 | The Crossing | A choral work in twelve parts, each a setting of a passage from the title essay originally published in The Long-Legged House (1969). Recording |
| Hymnody of Earth | Malcolm Dalglish | 1990 | The American Boychoir; James Litton, Conductor, Glen Velez, percussion. Other recording with The Ooolites (1997). | Performance at KET (PBS) |
| Payne Hollow | Shawn Jaeger | 2014 | Bard Conservatory Graduate Vocal Arts Program | An opera based on "Sonata at Payne Hollow," a verse drama published in 2001. Video preview |
| The Cold Pane | Shawn Jaeger | 2013 | Written for Dawn Upshaw. Commissioned by Saint Paul Chamber Orchestra | "A cycle of five songs on poems by Wendell Berry about death" |
| Various Vocal and Choral Works based on Wendell Berry Poems | Philip Orem | | | Orem has used more than 90 of Berry's texts in his music. Composer's website |
| Three Poems | William Campbell | 2014 | St. Ambrose University | "The Clearing Rests in Song and Shade," "I Go Among the Trees and Sit Still" and "All the Earth Shall Sing" from A Timbered Choir. Concert report |
| Anniversary Song | David Leisner | 1996 | Nina Faia, soprano, Anthony Zoeller, baritone, and Terry Decima, piano | Recording at Song of America |
| "And When I Rise" | Wendy Tuck and Peter Amidon (arr.) | 2020 | Wendy Tuck and Peter Amidon (arr.) | A setting of section VIII of "Prayers and Sayings of the Mad Farmer" from Farming: A Hand Book (1970). Video |
| "Leavings (The Wendell Berry Song)" | Rachel and Stephen Mosley | 2018 | The Mosleys | An adaptation of text from Sabbath Poems 2005 XVIII, XIX, 2006 I, II, III. Performance |
| Settings of selected poems | David Brunner | | | "The Circles of Our Lives," "The Wheel," "We Clasp the Hands," "A Timbered Choir" "The Peace of Wild Things," "A Music in the Air" |
| "The Peace of Wild Things/dayblind" | Crooked Still | 2011 | Crooked Still | On the album Friends of Fall. Recording |
| Seven Songs for Planet Earth | Olli Kortekangas | 2011 | Choral Arts Society of Washington and the Tampere Philharmonic Orchestra | Four of the movements are poems by Wendell Berry. |
| "Desolation" and "The Wheel" | Richard Carlson | 2010 | Richard Carlson | Two songs on the album Thus Spake Zarathustra |
| "Burley Coulter at the Bank" | John McCutcheon | 2018 | John McCutcheon | A song inspired by Berry's fictional character, on the album Ghost Light |
| "Wendell Berry in the Fields at Night" | Charlie Peacock | 2018 | Charlie Peacock | An instrumental jazz piece from the album When Light Flashes Help Is on the Way |
| "A Decent Man" | James McMurtry | 2021 | James McMurtry | A retelling of Berry's short story "Pray Without Ceasing." On the album The Horses and the Hounds |
| "The Peace of Wild Things" | Jake Runestad | 2018 | Stellenbosch University Chamber Choir: Martin Berger (conductor), Carmen van Renssen (piano) | Performance |
| "Great Trees" | Mary Alice Amidon, Peter Amidon (arr.) | 2020 | Guilford (VT) Community Church UCC choir | A setting of Sabbath Poem I from 1986. Performance |
| The Great Trees | Gwyneth Walker | 2010 | Commissioned and premiered by the Wolf River Singers, Germantown, TN. | A setting of five poems (identified as "The Peace of Wild Things," "The Dark Around Us," "The Timbered Choir," "Silence," and "Steps of the City"). |
| "The Peace of Wild Things" | Sean Ivory | 2020 | | Performance Publication |
| "The Porch Over the River" | Daniel Gilliam | 2018 | Chad Sloan (baritone), Carrie RavenStem (clarinetist) and Jessica Dorman (pianist) | Uses the poem from Openings (1968). Performed June 26, 2019, at Crescent Hill Baptist Church reception for launch of Berry's What I Stand On (Library of America). Score |
| "The Magic Hour" and "Planting Trees" | Andrew Peterson | 2010 | Andrew Peterson | On the album Counting Stars, cites Berry's phrase "The Peace of Wild Things". "Planting Trees" is inspired by the poem of the same name in The Country of Marriage (1973). Recording |
| "The Wild Rose" | Caroline Herring | 2009 | Caroline Herring | On the album Golden Apples of the Sun, uses imagery from Berry's poem of same name from Entries (1994). Recording |
| "Tanya's Edit" | Alanna Boudreau | 2021 | Alanna Boudreau | On the album Spanish Toast. Based on Berry's "Song" from The Country of Marriage (1973). Recording |
| "The Bluebells in Kentucky" | Mark Dvorak | 2008 | Mark Dvorak | On the album Time Ain't Got Nothin' On Me. Elements of the Port William stories are woven into the lyrics. Recording Lyrics |
| At Home | Timothy C. Takach | 2019 | Premiered by The Singers – Minnesota Choral Artists | A setting of four poems by Berry and one by Julia Klatt Singer. Comments, texts and video at the composer's site |
| "The Peace of Wild Things" | Joan Szymko | 2010 | The Milwaukee Choral Artists | Information at the composer's site Performance |
| "A Hard History of Love" and "1934" | Matt Wheeler | 2022 | Matt Wheeler | A response to two stories by Berry, "The Hurt Man" and "The Solemn Boy" |
| This Rock We're On: Imaginary Letters | Mike Holober | 2023 | Mike Holober & The Gotham Jazz Orchestra | Uses text by Berry to evoke "a farmer's commitment to soil and weather." |

== See also ==
- Agrarianism
- Fellowship of Southern Writers
- Front Porch Republic
- Wes Jackson
- The Land Institute
- Local food
- Localism (politics)
- Southern Agrarians
- Sustainability
- Subsidiarity
- John Seymour (author)
- Wallace Stegner
