= Counterpoint (publisher) =

American publishing company

- Founded: 2007
- Successor: Catapult
- Country of origin: United States
- Headquarters location: Berkeley, California
- Distribution: PenguinRandomHouse
- Key people: Charlie Winton, CEO; Jack Shoemaker, Vice President, Editorial director Richard Nash, Executive Editor
- Imprints: Counterpoint Press, Soft Skull Press, Sierra Club/Counterpoint
- Official website: counterpointpress.com

Counterpoint LLC was a publishing company that Perseus Books Group launched in 2007. It was formed from the consolidation of three presses: Perseus' Counterpoint Press, Shoemaker & Hoard, and Soft Skull Press. The company published books under both the Counterpoint Press and Soft Skull Press imprints. Counterpoint also entered into an agreement for the production, marketing, and distribution of approximately eight Sierra Club book titles each year.

Both Wendell Berry and poet Gary Snyder were investors in Counterpoint, with both having works published by the imprint. Jack Shoemaker, Vice-president and editorial director of Counterpoint, had worked with both authors in other companies for more than thirty years. Counterpoint notably published works by Albanian author Ismail Kadare, including A Girl in Exile, The Traitor’s Niche, and The Doll: A Portrait of My Mother.

Counterpoint merged into fellow publisher Catapult in 2016.

== Soft Skull Press ==
Soft Skull Press
- Parent company: Catapult, funded and co-founded by Elizabeth Koch
- Founded: 1992
- Founder: Sander Hicks
- Country of origin: United States
- Headquarters location: New York City
- Distribution: PenguinRandomHouse
- Key people: Yuka Igarashi, editor
- Nonfiction topics: Alternative culture, LGBTQ literature
- Imprints: Red Rattle Books
- Official website: softskull.com

Soft Skull Press is an independent book publisher founded by Sander Hicks in 1992, and run by Yuka Igarashi from 2017 until 2022, when she was hired by Graywolf Press.

In 2007, Richard Nash, who had taken Soft Skull over from Hicks in 2001, sold the publisher to Counterpoint, who closed Soft Skull's New York operation in 2010.

Counterpoint merged with fellow publisher Catapult in 2016. Subsequently, Soft Skull reopened its New York office with Yuka Igarashi as editor-in-chief, and began to reissue backlist books. These included The Amputee's Guide to Sex by Jillian Weise, Something Bright, Then Holes by Maggie Nelson, and Wayne Koestenbaum's 2004 novel, Moira Orfei in Aigues-Mortes under the new title, Circus. The publisher has since acquired and published new works.

== Bibliography ==
- Fost, Dan (2002-12-12). "Jack Shoemaker starts new book venture: Loyal authors follow him to division of Avalon Publishing". San Francisco Chronicle.
- Italie, Hillel (2007-05-10). "Publisher Perseus Announces Layoffs". Fox News. Archived from the original on January 22, 2016.
- Jain, Priya (2007-06-21). "The struggle for independents". Salon. Archived from the original on 2012-05-05.
- Kinsella, Bridget (2007-05-10). "Winton, Shoemaker & Co. Buys Counterpoint". Publishers Weekly. Archived from the original on October 9, 2007.
- Kinsella, Bridget (2007-05-16). "Winton Buys Soft Skull Press". Publishers Weekly.
- Kinsella, Bridget (2007-08-16). "Counterpoint, Sierra Club Team Up". Publishers Weekly. Archived from the original on 2016-01-22.
- Maher, John (2016-05-16). "Counterpoint, OR Books Partner on New Fall List". Publishers Weekly.
