= Townsend Entertainment =

American entertainment company

- Industry: Entertainment
- Founder: Robert Townsend
- Headquarters: Los Angeles, California, United States
- Products: Films television

Townsend Entertainment (also known as The Townsend Entertainment Company and officially, Townsend Entertainment Corporation) is an American entertainment company, involved primarily in the production of films and television programs. Townsend Entertainment was founded by actor, producer, director and writer Robert Townsend. Its headquarters are located in Beverly Hills, California.

== Overview ==
Townsend Entertainment was founded by Robert Townsend in July 1995. It is just one of several entertainment companies that Townsend has founded. His others include Tinsel Townsend Productions, Inc. which produced The Meteor Man (1993) and Townsend Television (1993), Conquering Unicorn Inc. producing Hollywood Shuffle in 1987, and more.

== History ==
In 1995, Townsend Entertainment partnered with Warner Bros. for the production of The Parent 'Hood, a family sitcom starring Townsend as Robert Peterson. The show was first released on January 18, 1995 and aired until July 25, 1999. In the show's earlier seasons, it was revered as "the 'Cosby Show' of the '90's" intertwining family morals and values with comedy.

Townsend Entertainment collaborated with V Studio to produce In the Hive (2012), a drama film starring Jonathan McDaniel, Michael Clarke Duncan, Vivica A. Fox and Loretta Devine. The film was written by Cheryl West and directed and produced by Robert Townsend.

In more recent years, Townsend Entertainment released Playin' for Love, a romantic comedy about a high school basketball coach and his star player's mother. Starring Robert Townsend and Salli Richardson, the film was released on January 16, 2015. The film made its debut at the 17th Annual American Black Film Festival (ABFF) in Miami Beach, Florida in 2013 at the Colony Theatre. The screening was a red carpet event featuring a live mural by MLK Mural. Townsend was awarded a grant from the City of Miami Community Redevelopment Agency for the film and employed students from the University of Miami to assist in the making of the final product.

== Films ==
- Why We Laugh: Black Comedians on Black Comedy, 2009
- In the Hive, 2012
- Playin' for Love, 2015

== Television shows ==
- The Parent 'Hood, 1995
- Musical Theater of Hope, 2009
- Diary of a Single Mom, 2012

== Awards and nominations ==
The Parent 'Hood

- American Cinema Foundation, 1997
  - E Pluribus Unum Award – Television Series Comedy
- NCLR Bravo Awards Nominations, 1996
  - Outstanding Television Series Actress in a Crossover Role, Reagan Gomez-Preston
- Young Artist Award Nominations, 1996
  - Best Performance by an Actress Under Ten – Television, Kylie Erica Mar
- Young Artist Award Winners, 1997
  - Best Performance in a TV Comedy/Drama – Supporting Young Actress Age Ten or Under, Ashli Adams
  - Best Performance in a TV Comedy/Drama – Supporting Young Actor Age Ten or Under, Curtis Williams
- Young Artist Award Nominations, 1998
  - Best Family TV Comedy Series
  - Best Performance in a TV Comedy Series – Young Actress Age Ten or Under, Ashli Adams
  - Best Performance in a TV Comedy Series – Young Actor Age Ten or Under, Curtis Williams
  - Best Performance in a TV Comedy Series – Guest Starring Young Actor, Billee Thomas
  - Best Performance in a TV Comedy Series – Guest Starring Young Actor, Cody McMains

In the Hive

- NAACP Image Awards Nominations, 2013
  - Outstanding Actress in a Motion Picture, Loretta Devine

== See also ==
- Robert Townsend
- Tinsel Townsend
- Conquering Unicorn
- Making the Five Heartbeats
