= Moumita =

Moumita is an Indian feminine given name and may refer to:

- Moumita Das, Indian physicist
- Moumita Dutta Indian physicist
- Moumita Gupta Indian actress in Bengali film and television

== See also ==
- Mamta (disambiguation)
- Mamita (disambiguation)
