= Lydia Nicole =

American actress

- Occupations: Actress, comedian, writer, producer
- Known for: Common Sense Mamita
- Height: 5 ft 4 in (163 cm)

Lydia Nicole is an American actress, comedian, writer and producer based out of Los Angeles, California. Her career in the entertainment industry began in 1972 with the Inner City Broadcasting Corporation at New York City R&B station, WBLS-FM. In 1981, she made her debut as an actress guest starring on The Greatest American Hero. Nicole is best known for her role as Rafaela in Stand and Deliver, and her current project, web series Common Sense Mamita.

== Early life and education ==
Nicole grew up in Spanish Harlem, New York City. From 13 to 18 years old, she worked for radio station WBLS-FM, New York as assistant music director.

== Career ==
Nicole landed her first role on television in 1981 when she guest starred in The Greatest American Hero. She made appearances in shows such as Hill Street Blues (1981) and The Fall Guy (1981), and movies like Murder in Texas (1981). In a 1983 issue of Ebony Magazine, Nicole was named one of the "New Faces in Hollywood". In 1982, she appeared in a two-part episode of The Jeffersons as gang leader, Rachel, who robs and stabs George Jefferson. She then landed the role as Rafaela costarring with Edward James Olmos in Stand and Deliver.

=== Common Sense Mamita ===
Common Sense Mamita is a comedic web series written, produced and hosted by Nicole. The show premiered on Latin Heat Entertainment in 2013 and has run weekly every Thursday since.

=== Acting Smarter Now ===
Acting Smarter Now is a weekly podcast produced and hosted by Lydia Nicole. The podcast was created to help actors and creatives navigate the entertainment industry, covering topics such as auditioning, craft, branding, publicity, representation, standup comedy, writing and more. On the podcast, Lydia has interviewed iconic filmmakers, actors, comedians, acting coaches, casting directors and writers such as Robert Townsend, Blair Underwood, Ivana Chubbuck, Andrea Romano and Danny Kallis. The show premiered in early 2023 and releases a new episode every week.

== Other ventures ==
Nicole co-produced comedy shows "Funny Ladies of Color" and the "Hot & Spicy Mamitas", and also wrote, produced and starred in her second one-woman show, A Rose Grows in Spanish Harlem. Starting in 1985, Nicole began working alongside filmmaker Robert Townsend" on the movie Hollywood Shuffle (1988). She worked with him again in 2002 on film and web series productions. She started as a basic assistant and became associate producer of Code Black Entertainment's Why We Laugh: Black Comedians on Black Comedy, Los Americans, and In the Hive. In 2015, she produced Townsend's film Playin' for Love, a romantic comedy film with Townsend Entertainment.

=== Philanthropy ===
From 1991 to 2002, Nicole took her childhood story Calling up Papi to high schools across the country and youth authorities around Southern California in an effort to promote the importance of education to inner city kids and juvenile offenders.

She spoke for various organizations such as Athletes and Entertainers For Kids, The Ryan White program, Kareem's Kids and Kathy Ireland's Mother's and Daughter's Tea.

== Filmography ==
Year	Title	Role	Director
1981	The Greatest American Hero		
1981	Murder in Texas	Nurse Pollard	Billy Hale
1981	Hill Street Blues	Girl/rape victim	Randa Haines
1982	The Jeffersons	Rachel	Bob Lally
1982	Honeyboy	Soledad	John Barry
1983	Max Dugan Returns	Celia	Herbert Ross
1984	Shattered Vows	Nun	Jack Bender
1984	The Fall Guy		
1985	A Death in California	Delores	Delbert Mann
1985	Hell Town - TV series	Milo	Don Medford
1987	Sister Margaret and the Saturday Night Ladies	Isabel	Paul Wendkos
1987	Hollywood Shuffle	Make-up woman	Robert Townsend (actor)
1988	Stand and Deliver	Rafaela Fuentes	Ramón Menéndez
1989	Thirtysomething	Janet	Peter Horton
1990	Cop Rock	Miriam Hernandez	Gregory Hoblit
1993	Rock the Vote		
1993	Indecent Proposal	Citizenship student	Adrian Lyne
1994	Stranger By Night	Hooker #1	Gregory Brown
1998	Martial Law - TV series	Maria	John Kretchmer
2000	Rave	Rosa	Ron Krauss
2001	10 Attitudes	Claire	Michael Gallant
2006	Sweet Deadly Dreams	Detective Rodriguez	Walter Stewart
2013	Common Sense Mamita	Hostess	
2014	Latinas Chat Media		
2015	Absolutely Jason Stuart		

By 1988, Nicole took up comedy in the Latino standup world. She was one of very few Latinas on the comedy circuit and a regular at the World Famous Comedy Store. She also opened for her former employer, R&B singer Patrice Rushen. In 1993, Nicole was featured on BET's Comic View. In 1991, the lack of racial and gender diversity in stand up prompted Nicole to co-find "Funny Ladies of Color" with comic Cha Cha Sandoval and agent Sharona Fae. The group was composed of women of color including Sherri Shepherd, Jackie Guerra, Dyana Ortelli, Lotus Weinstock and Carlease Burke. She also co-founded "The Hot & Spicy Mamitas", the first all female Latina stand-up comedy show, featuring Sully Diaz, Marilyn Martinez, Ludo Vika and Dyana Ortelli. Together, they released a stand-up comedy album on Uproar Records. The group was mentioned in Darryl J. Littleton and Tuezdae Littleton's book, Comediennes: Laugh Be a Lady along with female comedians Whoopi Goldberg, Lily Tomlin, Lucille Ball, and Margaret Cho.

Nicole took her standup and created her first one-woman show entitled "Calling Up Papi" at the World Famous Comedy Store in which she performs the roles of 26 characters.
