= Mamita =

Mamita may refer to:

== Arts ==
- Mamitas, 2011 film with E.J. Bonilla
- "Mamita", tango sung by Carlos Gardel lyrics by Francisco Bohigas and words by Ángel Félix Danesi, 1929
- "Mamita" (song), a 2017 song by CNCO

=== Festival ===
- Mamita (dance), a dance of the Mamita festival
- Mamita Festival, a harvest festival of Tripura, India

== People ==
- Walter Calderón (born 1977), Ecuadorian football player
- Mamita Fox (born 1943), Curaçao-born writer
- The Hot & Spicy Mamitas, LA comedy group

=== Fictional ===
- Mamita, played by Pilita Corrales, in Lagot Ka, Isusumbong Kita
- Mamita in Gigi (musical)
- Mamita, character in the web series Common Sense Mamita, played by Lydia Nicole
- Mamita Yunai, a 1940 novel by Carlos Luis Fallas

== Other ==
- Mamita (originally from marmita) in Berber cuisine, pan full with different kinds of vegetables, meat and spices

== See also ==
- Moumita (disambiguation)
