= The Hot & Spicy Mamitas =

American Latina comedy group

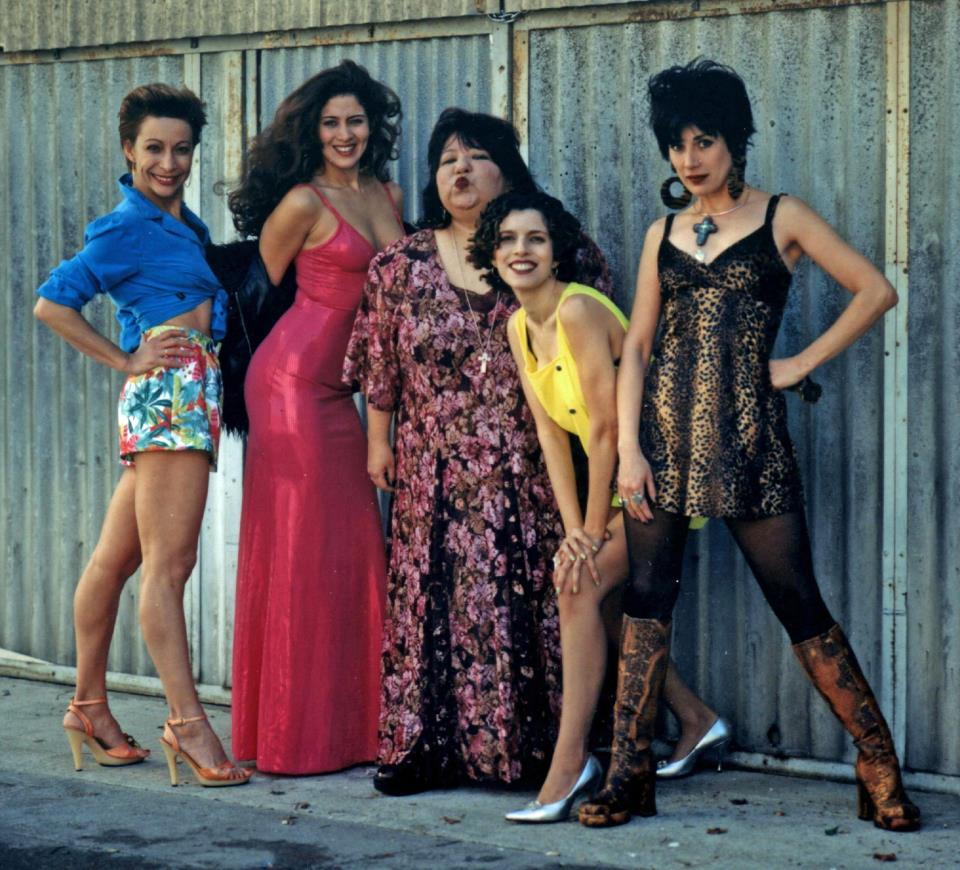
- Notable work: Hot and Spicy Mamitas (1998)

Comedy career
- Years active: 1994
- Members: Marilyn Martinez, Sully Diaz, Lydia Nicole, Ludo Vika, Dyana Ortelli
- Former members: Debi Guttierez

The Hot & Spicy Mamitas were an American Latino comedy group based out of Los Angeles, California. The group included comedians Debi Guttierez, Sully Diaz, Marilyn Martinez, Lydia Nicole, Ludo Vika, and later, Dyana Ortelli. In 1994, these women joined forces and became the first all female Latina comedy group. They were instrumental in creating social change through comedy which benefitted both the female, and Latino minorities.

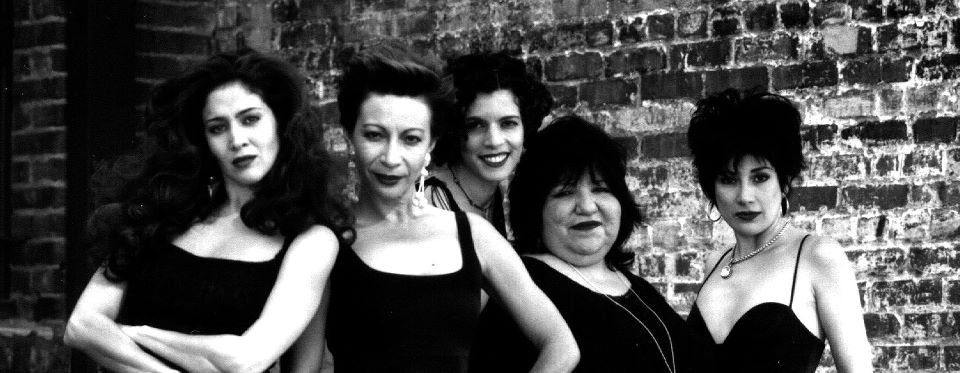

== Members ==
- Sully Diaz
- Marilyn Martinez
- Lydia Nicole
- Dyana Ortelli
- Ludo Vika,

== Media ==
In 1998, the Mamitas put out a self-titled comedy album with Uproar Entertainment.
