= Another Page (TV series) =

1981 American television program

- Genre: Educational; Instructional; Soap opera
- Written by: Guy Mendes
- Directed by: Thomas Wood
- Presented by: Jonas Cheney (1981); Wally Amos (1988)
- Starring: Jonas Cheney; Wally Amos; Robert Townsend; Joe Seneca; Roxanne Reese; Ellis Williams; Tania Myren; Sarah Woods; Mike Houlihan
- Country of origin: United States
- Original language: English
- No. of seasons: 1
- No. of episodes: 15 (plus an introduction episode)

Production
- Producers: Guy Mendes; Judy Tipton
- Production location: Lexington, Kentucky
- Camera setup: Multi-camera
- Running time: 30 minutes
- Production company: Kentucky Educational Television

Original release
- Network: KET
- Release: October 14, 1981 – January 1982
- Network: PBS
- Release: February 1988 – March 1988

Related
- Learn to Read

Another Page is a 1981 adult educational television series consisting of 15 episodes designed for adults looking to improve their reading skills. Produced by the Kentucky Educational Television (KET) network following the original version of its successful GED on TV series, the program was originally hosted by then-future WPXI-TV news anchor Jonas Cheney. The program was revised in 1988 as a follow-up program to fellow adult literacy series, Learn to Read, which was first broadcast in 1987; that program's host, cookie entrepreneur and literacy advocate Wally Amos, hosted the introduction and instructional segments in the 1988 revision, with the story segments and some instructional sequences from the original version retained.

The 1988 revision was broadcast nationally through PBS, and continued to air in reruns as late as the early- to mid-2000s.

== Format ==
In addition to aiding adults in studying for the GED tests, the series was designed to teach intermediate reading skills to adults who read on a fifth through eighth grade level. The first and third segments of each episode features a soap opera-like continuing story in which the characters use reading materials to help cope with situations that can and would usually be expected in real life. The mid-episode segment known as "The Inside Story" (known as the "News and Features" segment in the original version), tips and advice on how to comprehend reading, including the pursuit of the main idea of sentences and/or paragraphs, are provided in each episode by the host and a few additional instructors.

In a similar manner with KET's GED on TV series, accompanying the series were three workbooks (five for the 1988 revival), which provided further instruction and reading practice to further improve the student's reading skills.

== Cast ==
=== Hosts ===
- Jonas Cheney - Host/Anchor person (original version)
- Wally Amos - Host/Anchor person (1988 revision)

=== Instructional segments/"The Inside Story" ===
- Dr. Felix Goode
- Connie Clampett
- Joe Holcomb
- Leo Anders - "Leo Gets Letters"

=== Cast of characters in the story segments ===
- Robert Townsend as Darrell Foster
- Roxanne Reese as Gloria
- Ellis Williams as Martin
- Joe Seneca as Mr. John
- Tania Myren as Rhonda
- Sara Woods as Candy
- Mike Houlihan as Bobby
