= Joe Seneca =

American actor, singer and songwriter (1919–1996)

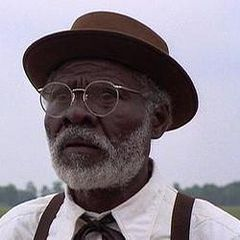
- Seneca during filming of 1986's Crossroads
- Born: Joel McGhee Jr. January 14, 1919; Cleveland, Ohio, U.S.
- Died: August 15, 1996 (aged 77); Roosevelt Island, New York City, U.S.
- Occupations: Actor; Singer; Songwriter
- Years active: 1940s–1996

Joe Seneca (January 14, 1919 – August 15, 1996) was an American actor, singer, and songwriter. He is known for his roles as Willie Brown in Crossroads (1986), Dr. Meadows in The Blob (1988), and Dr. Hanes in The Cosby Show, among others.

== Life and career ==
Seneca was born Joel McGhee Jr. in Cleveland, Ohio.

Music

Before his acting career, he belonged to the R&B singing group The Three Riffs, which was active from the late 1940s to the mid 1970s, and performed at upscale supper clubs in New York City.

He was also a songwriter and had big hits with "Talk to Me", sung by Little Willie John, and "Break It to Me Gently," which was a smash hit by Brenda Lee in 1962 and by Juice Newton in 1982.

Theatre

In the early 1970s, Seneca transitioned into acting, beginning in regional theatre at the Eugene O'Neill National Playwrights Conference in Waterford, Connecticut. He debuted on Broadway in Of Mice and Men with James Earl Jones (1974). In 1981, he performed in The Little Foxes with Elizabeth Taylor. In 1982, he had a role in Rhinestone, an off-Broadway musical. Seneca could play piano, but in the 1984 Broadway production of August Wilson's play, Ma Rainey's Black Bottom, he was asked to portray the old blues trombonist, Cutler. He learned the trombone specifically for the part.

Film

Seneca's theatrical film career includes The Verdict (1982), in which he played Dr. Thompson, a small-town women's hospital physician brought in by attorney Frank Galvin (Paul Newman) to support his belief that two famous doctors' incompetence left his client alive but in a coma. Arguably his most well-known role is blues-man Willie Brown in Crossroads (1986). He also played Dr. Meddows in The Blob (1988), the evil head of a government team who created, and was sent to contain, the title creature. That same year, Seneca appeared in Spike Lee's School Daze as Mission College President McPherson.

Television

On television he appeared in more than twenty series, including The Cosby Show as Hillman President, Dr. Zachariah J. Hanes. He also played Alvin Newcastle, a man suffering from Alzheimer's disease, on The Golden Girls in the 1987 episode "Old Friends". That same year, He appeared in Michael Jackson's music video "The Way You Make Me Feel." On The Equalizer he played Fossil Williams, a mission worker looking after the spiritual and physical well-being of the down-and-out homeless of Skid row in The Bowery neighborhood of New York City in the episode, "17 Zebra". He played Eddie Haynes on Matlock in "The Blues Singer" (1989). Seneca played "Blind Otis Lemon" (based on Muddy Waters), a homeless blues legend who gets one last chance to sing and play in a club the night before an operation that may leave him deaf in the Doogie Howser, M.D. episode "Doogie Sings the Blues" (1990). He later played murder witness Lionel Jackson in the Law & Order episode "Profile" (1993).

He also appeared in several television films, including Wilma (1977), The House of Dies Drear (1984), A Gathering of Old Men (1987), and The Vernon Johns Story (1994). Seneca's final screen role was portraying Whitechaple in the British television film The Longest Memory (1997) which he completed just two weeks prior to his death.

== Death ==
He died at his home on Roosevelt Island, New York City from coronary arrest after an asthma attack August 15, 1996, at the age of 77. He was married to his wife, Betty Seneca, until his death.

== Filmography ==
=== Film ===
Joe Seneca film credits
Year	Title	Role	Notes
1974	The Taking of Pelham One Two Three	Police Sergeant	
1979	The Fish That Saved Pittsburgh	Mr. Sweets	
1979	Kramer vs. Kramer	Partygoer #6	
1982	The Verdict	Dr. Thompson	
1984	The Evil That Men Do	Santiago	
1985	Heart of the Garden	Unknown	
1985	Silverado	Ezra	
1986	Crossroads	Willie Brown	
1987	Big Shots	Ferryman	
1987	Moments Without Proper Names		Directed by Gordon Parks
1988	School Daze	President McPherson	
1988	The Blob	Dr. Meddows	
1990	Mo' Better Blues	Big Stop's Friend	
1991	Mississippi Masala	Williben Williams	
1992	Malcolm X	Toomer	
1993	The Saint of Fort Washington	Spits	
1996	A Time to Kill	Reverend Isaiah Street	

=== Television ===
Joe Seneca film credits
Year	Title	Role	Notes	Ref.
1977	Wilma	Ed Rudolph	Television film	
1981	Another Page	Mr. John	15 episodes	
1984	The House of Dies Drear	Pluto	Television film	
1987	A Gathering of Old Men	Clatoo	Television film	
1987	The Cosby Show	Dr. Zachariah J. Hanes	Episode: "Hillman" (S3.E23)	
1987	The Golden Girls	Alvin Newcastle	Episode: "Old Friends" (S3.E1)	
1988	227	Wailing Eddie Tompkins	Episode: "Blues"	
1989	The Equalizer	Fossil Williams	Episode: "17 Zebra"	
1989	Matlock	Eddie Hayns	Episode: "The Blues Singer" (S3.E19)	
1989	In the Heat of the Night	Rev. John Carter	Episode: "Anniversary"	
1990	China Beach	Ernie	Episode: "Skylark" (S3.E18)	
1990	Doogie Howser, M.D.	Blind Otis Lemon	Episode: "Doogie Sings the Blues"	
1993	Law & Order	Lionel Jackson	Episode: "Profile" (S4.E4)	
1994	The Vernon Johns Story	Deacon Wilkes	Television film	
1997	The Longest Memory	Whitechapel	Television film (final screen role)	
