= List of The Parent 'Hood episodes =

This page lists the episodes of the 1995–99 television sitcom The Parent 'Hood. There is a total of 90 episodes in this series.

== Series overview ==
Season	Episodes	Originally released	
Season	Episodes	First released	Last released
1	13	January 18, 1995	May 17, 1995
2	22	September 6, 1995	May 15, 1996
3	22	September 8, 1996	May 18, 1997
4	22	September 7, 1997	May 17, 1998
5	11	May 30, 1999	July 25, 1999

== Episodes ==
=== Season 1 (1995) ===
No. overall	No. in season	Title	Directed by	Written by	Original release date	Prod. code	Viewers (millions)
1	1	"Ring Around the Nosey"	John Bowab	Ellen L. Fogle	January 18, 1995	456902	4.1
Michael and Zaria use reverse psychology to get their parents to let them have their grandmother's car by pretending Michael wants a tattoo and Zaria a nose ring, but the plan backfires. Robert and Jerri trick the kids by encouraging them and even driving them to the tattoo/piercing parlor. Meanwhile, Mrs. Wilcox dates a young man and asks Robert's advice on lovemaking—and the disturbing images this arouses in Robert's mind affect his performance with Jerri.
2	2	"The Rake, the Fake and the Gopher Snake"	John Bowab	Michelle Jones	January 25, 1995	456904	3.6
Robert is concerned when Zaria goes on a date with Michael's shallow friend Troy, and resorts to hiring a woman from Derek's acting class to lure Troy away. When Jerri catches Robert in the closet with this woman, he's got a lot of explaining to do. Meanwhile, Nicholas's beloved pet snake gets loose in the house, and when he replaces it with a dummy snake, Jerri thinks it died due to her neglect.
3	3	"Pizza Man"	Rob Schiller	Steve Billnitzer	February 1, 1995	456906	2.9
In an attempt to establish a strong work ethic in Michael, Robert makes a bet that he can work side by side with Michael at his pizza parlor job. Unbeknownst to Robert, the manager of the pizza parlor once flunked Robert's class. Meanwhile, worried about gaining weight, Zaria appoints Nicholas her "health cop." Every time she takes an unnecessary bite of food, Nicholas gets to punish her by looking at a page from her diary.
4	4	"Crappy Anniversary"	Rob Schiller	Andy Guerdat	February 8, 1995	456905	3.9
Robert pretends to forget his anniversary, while all the while he's made special plans for a surprise romantic evening with Jerri; but when the evening arrives, he must first attend a lecture with special guest Jeffrey Osborne. When an unexpected blizzard ruins Robert's special anniversary plans, he convinces the singing star to come to his house and help save his marriage. Meanwhile, when Michael is unable to repay a loan to Zaria, she forces him to perform humiliating tasks around the house.
5	5	"Like Father, Like Hell"	Rob Schiller	Valerie Ahern & Christian McLaughlin	February 15, 1995	456907	3.4
Robert, who has been critical of Michael's former girlfriends, agrees to be nice to college sophomore Patrice when she comes to dinner. But Patrice makes a pass at a shocked Robert when they are alone—and nobody believes his story. Later, Patrice suggests to Jerri that she and Michael accompany the young couple on a double date at a restaurant, where Jerri catches Patrice in action.
6	6	"The Paw that Rocks the Cradle"	Linda Day	Andrew Nicholls & Darrell Vickers	February 22, 1995	456908	3.1
Robert hopes a stray mutt will replace Nicholas' imaginary friend—if they can keep the pup hidden from pooch-hater Jerri. The school psychologist convinces Robert than an imaginary friend is completely normal—but when he relievedly tells Jerri about the dog, Jerri and the psychologist are convinced he's the delusional one.
7	7	"IQ, UQ, We All Q"	John Bowab	Rob Edwards	March 1, 1995	456903	3.1
A dinner visit from Robert's classmate, now an arrogant Princeton professor who believes men are smarter than women, sparks a battle of the sexes when Jerri scores higher than Robert on an I.Q. test included in the professor's latest book.
8	8	"Byte Me"	David Steinberg	Ricky Blitt	March 15, 1995	456909	3.1
To avoid a sex chat, Robert puts Michael on-line with a health program, which the teen uses to access a computer sex line catering to swingers. Before Robert catches on, Michael makes a date with a female correspondent—and is shocked when his date, LaWanda, turns out to be an elderly woman with a moustache.
9	9	"Trial by Jerri"	John Bowab	Story by : Rob Edwards; Teleplay by : Andrew Guerdat & Michelle Jones	March 22, 1995	456911	3.5
Robert charges Michael and Zaria with being too irresponsible to have a party---so the family holds a mock trial, with Jerri serving as the defense attorney.
10	10	"Don't Be Alarmed"	David Steinberg	Wayne Kline	March 29, 1995	456910	3.0
A series of burglaries, followed by Nicholas's bike being stolen, prompt Robert and Jerri to buy an alarm system. Robert doesn't want to pay for the high cost of installation so he hires Derek and Wendell to do the job. Derek and Wendell are complete amateurs and fail to install the system properly. That evening the alarm goes off several times waking the family and bringing police to the door. When the alarm is finally disabled, Robert and Jerri talk about what happened and decide they can feel safe without a security device.
11	11	"Nice Guys Finish Last"	John Bowab	Andrew Nicholls & Darrell Vickers	May 3, 1995	456913	2.7
Robert is so impressed with Zaria's new boyfriend, Daryl Cooper, that he actually envisions him as his future son-in-law. Zaria is not nearly as taken with Daryl and tells her father she intends to break up with him. Robert is crushed by the news. He believes that if Zaria spent more time with Daryl she would grow to like him. He lets Daryl use his Volvo to take Zaria to a concert. Zaria spends some quality time with Daryl and decides not to break up with him.
12	12	"The Bully Pulpit"	John Bowab	Valerie Ahern & Christian McLaughlin	May 10, 1995	456912	2.9
When a bully picks on Nicholas, it brings back memories of Robert's own childhood nemesis---and he decides to track the man down and settle the score.
13	13	"Trust a Move"	Joel Zwick	Story by : Robert Townsend & Andrew Nicholls & Darrell Vickers; Teleplay by : Andrew Nicholls & Darrell Vickers	May 17, 1995	456901	3.5
When 15-year-old Michael asks if he can attend a basketball game, Robert says "yes." But Robert denies 14-year-old Zaria's request for permission to go to a "gangsta" rap concert. Later, Jerri reminds Robert that their parents objected to the music they used to listen to and convinces him that he is too protective of Zaria. Robert relents and allows Zaria to go to the concert—but he and Derek secretly follow her in what they imagine to be hip-hop attire.

=== Season 2 (1995–96) ===
No. overall	No. in season	Title	Directed by	Written by	Original release date	Prod. code	Viewers (millions)
14	1	"Robert in the 'Hood"	Gerren Keith	Franklyn Ajaye & Barry "Berry" Douglas	September 6, 1995	457951	3.9
Robert is accused of being out of touch when he voices objection to the lyrics of a rap song written by Michael and his posse, so he takes Michael to the "hood" to show him he hasn't forgotten his roots. Meanwhile, Zaria wants her own phone line after discovering Nicholas and Cece are listening in on her phone conversations, and Jerri insists she do chores in exchange; and Wendell fails miserably on his first day of substitute teaching.
15	2	"A Kiss is Just a Kiss"	Gerren Keith	Carolyn Omine	September 13, 1995	457952	3.3
It's a case of kiss and tell for Nicholas when he kisses a classmate and his teacher tells his parents that he is sexually harassing the girl. Meanwhile, after seeing Zaria kiss the son of a record company executive, Michael tries to get the executive to listen to his demo tape.
16	3	"Don't Take My Wife, Please"	Gerren Keith	Sara V. Finney & Vida Spears	September 20, 1995	457953	4.0
Jerri's new study partner is funny, smart, handsome—and a male dancer. Robert becomes even more jealous after Jerri, due to time constraints, agrees to meet her study partner at the dance club where he works, and follows Jerri only to find himself thrust on stage as the MC, with Wendell as a supposed erotic dancer. Jerri, busy backstage studying, has no interest in seeing the show until she hears Robert's voice. Meanwhile, Michael and Nicholas scheme to sell the family collection of baby teeth to the neighborhood kids, who in turn use them to get money from their parents/the tooth fairy.
17	4	"Track Dreams"	Paul Miller	Greg Fields	September 27, 1995	457954	4.3
Zaria runs into trouble when her parents discover she's received preferential treatment from her track coach—and her grades start to slip. Meanwhile, Wendell tries to earn extra money selling cosmetics to Jerri and her friends.
18	5	"Wendell and Muriel's Wedding"	Joel Zwick	Rushion McDonald & J. Anthony Brown	October 4, 1995	457955	4.4
Robert and Jerri finds themselves stuck in the middle when Wendell proposes to a woman he met at Cece's fourth birthday party after a 24-hour whirlwind courtship - and then proposes that the Peterson hold the reception at their house.
19	6	"The Taxi Man"	Leonard R. Garner, Jr.	Franklyn Ajaye & Barry "Berry" Douglas	October 25, 1995	457959	4.7
Nicholas thinks Halloween is going to be anything but a treat after he hears a local legend about a cab-driving ghost, who appears if his name is called three times. Meanwhile, Michael tries come up with a brilliant way to scare Zaria.
20	7	"Poppa Was a Rolling Stone"	Glynn R. Turman	Al Sonja L. Rice	November 8, 1995	457958	4.3
Robert is overwhelmed when the kids throw him a surprise party. Unable to cope with the surprise, Robert leaves the party. Jerri explains that Robert's father left him and his family on his eighth birthday and never returned. The kids put an ad in the newspaper trying to track down their missing grandfather. Their grandfather eventually responds to the ad. Jerri encourages Robert to confront his father to mend their relationship so that the kids can know their grandfather. Robert attempts reconciliation, but they end up butting heads. Robert contemplates the negative cycle of fathers leaving their families and decides to break the cycle. He returns to his father's house with his kids to celebrate his birthday and their reunion.
21	8	"Welcome Back, Robert"	Linda Day	Greg Fields	November 15, 1995	457961	4.5
Wendell needs a positive role model to speak to his class of troubled youths, so he asks Robert, who has trouble gaining the class's respect. Meanwhile, Michael and Zaria believe that their mother may be pregnant.
22	9	"Not With My Daughter"	Linda Day	Rushion McDonald & J. Anthony Brown	November 22, 1995	457962	4.0
Robert lends a helping hand to reformed gang member Ricky, but when Zaria takes a romantic interest in the young man, her father gets up in arms.
23	10	"Just say Yes, No or Maybe"	Paul Miller	Marc Warren & Dennis Rinsler	November 29, 1995	457956	4.3
Robert overhears Michael and his girlfriend planning to take the next big step in their relationship, so he cautions his son about sexual responsibility. But the boy mistakenly interprets it as a parental OK. Meanwhile, Nicholas becomes obsessed with superstition when Wendell gives him a good luck charm.
24	11	"The Man Who Canceled Christmas"	Glynn R. Turman	Carolyn Omine	December 20, 1995	457964	5.5
Robert decides to cancel the Christmas holiday because he is disgusted with his children's greedy behavior. On Christmas Eve, all of the children have the same strange dream where they are visited by elves, which look a lot like Wendell and Robert. The elves make each of the kids realize how terrible they've been acting. The next morning Robert has a change of heart and decides to celebrate Christmas as usual. However the kids decide to celebrate Christmas a different way by giving all of their presents to needy children.
25	12	"One Man and a Baby"	Paul Miller	Franklin Ajaye & Barry "Berry" Douglas	January 10, 1996	457965	5.1
Michael thinks he's found the perfect girl in Chantel, one with looks, charm, a sense of humor—and an infant son. Meanwhile, Wendell tries to win the grand prize on America's Funniest Home Videos.
26	13	"Little Bitty Pretty One"	Linda Day	Carolyn Omine	January 31, 1996	457960	4.8
Cece wins a kids regional beauty contest, turning her into an insufferable egotist and prompting Robert to launch "Operation Shrink Cece's Head."
27	14	"Substitute's Pet"	Howard Ritter	Al Sonja L. Rice	February 7, 1996	457963	4.4
Wendell subs in Nicholas' class and makes him the teacher's pet. Nicholas' classmates are jealous of the preferential treatment he is getting so they begin to taunt him relentlessly. In order to get back into his friends' good graces, Nicholas plays a practical joke on Wendell. His classmates stop harassing him but Nicholas feels very guilty about pulling the prank. The next day he goes to Wendell and admits he was the one who played the practical joke. He says he only did it so his classmates would stop teasing him. Wendell accepts Nicholas' apology and begins treating him like a normal student, including making him sit in the corner as punishment for his prank.
28	15	"The Lost Weekend"	Paul Miller	Andrea Allen	February 14, 1996	457966	4.6
There's a slight hitch in Wendell's offer to take Robert and Jerri on a "free" Valentine's getaway to a romantic Pocono Mountains resort: the free weekend is a gimmick used to sell vacation time shares, and Robert and Jerri spend most of their time being hounded by a relentless salesman from the resort. Meanwhile, while the kids have the house to themselves for the first time, Ira runs away from home.
29	16	"I'm O'Tay, Your O-Tay"	David Steinberg	Billiam Coronel	February 21, 1996	457969	4.6
In observance of Black History Month, Nicholas must choose a famous African-American to portray at a school assembly, but shocks his family when he tells them he wants to be Buckwheat from The Little Rascals. Robert suggests to Nicholas that he choose an African-American figure with a more positive image, but Nicholas is adamant about his choice, so Robert decides to lend his son support. At the assembly, Nicholas comes out dressed in Buckwheat garb and speaks in an almost unintelligible style, which was Buckwheat's trademark. However, midway through his speech, Nicholas takes off his Buckwheat wig to explain that during Buckwheat's era, black actors had to portray stereotypical characters if they wanted to be in movies at all, and that we should honor these black film pioneers for making it easier for future generations of African-American actors. Meanwhile, Cece wants to be more like her big sister Zaria by emulating her.
30	17	"Torn Between Two Brothers"	Paul Miller	Greg Fields	February 28, 1996	457967	3.8
Robert's fraternity brother Greg comes to New York to oversee an art auction. Robert, who hasn't seen Greg in ten years, spends all of his free time with his old buddy, alienating Wendell, who becomes particularly upset after Robert passes up going to the Knicks/Bulls game with him in favor of attending Greg's auction. Wendell has the last laugh when he shows up at the auction with proof that Greg's supposed masterpieces are really common, mass-produced works. Meanwhile, Zaria tries not to become jealous when an ex-boyfriend asks out one of her friends.
31	18	"An American Class President"	Glynn R. Turman	Carolyn Omine & Rushion McDonald & J. Anthony Brown	March 13, 1996	457971	4.8
Zaria runs for class president against Bradley, a popular senior who stoops to use dirty politics by spreading false rumors about her. Furious, Zaria discovers that Bradley has a drug problem and was about to enter the school's counseling program before it was cancelled. Her moral dilemma is whether to sling the mud back at Bradley.
32	19	"We Don't Need Another Hero"	Shelley Jensen	Sara V. Finner & Vida Spears	April 21, 1996	457957	2.4
Zaria gets chosen to appear in a music video with her friends for her favorite performer, Sashay, but Robert forbids her, saying the videos are offensive. Zaria secretly goes to the taping anyway, and Michael accompanies her so he can promote his music. Meanwhile, Nicholas imitates his favorite sports hero and upsets Jerri by acting tough and disobeying her. Robert and Jerri punish him and teach him to distinguish a fantasy figure from reality. Also, Robert and Wendell fantasize about being in a 1970s action film defeating a criminal named Slick.
33	20	"I Never Danced for My Mother"	David Steinberg	Rushion McDonald & J. Anthony Brown	May 1, 1996	457968	3.4
When Nicholas decides to show off his dance moves in a school talent show, Jerri, who was classically trained, steps in as his teacher; but he finds studying with her akin to attending boot camp. Also, Wendell and Robert stumble upon Zaria's diary.
34	21	"Ode to Billy Stankbreath"	Glynn R. Turman	Greg Fields & Franklin Ajaye & Barry "Berry" Douglas	May 8, 1996	457972	3.8
Robert begins to appreciate life more when an old acquaintance of his passes away. He plans a picnic for the family, and when the bad weather keeps them from going outdoors, they wind up delivering the baby of Wendell's pregnant passenger.
35	22	"Reconcilable Differences"	David Steinberg	Andrea Allen	May 15, 1996	457970	4.0
Nicholas overhears a difference of opinion between his parents and mistakenly thinks they are getting a divorce because of him, and enlists Wendell's help in trying to keep them together. Meanwhile, an overworked Jerri asks Michael and Zaria to babysit Cece.

=== Season 3 (1996–97) ===
No. overall	No. in season	Title	Directed by	Written by	Original release date	Prod. code	Viewers (millions)
36	1	"The Critic"	Gerren Keith	Charmaine Dixon	September 8, 1996	466051	4.0
As film critic of the local cable show "Brothers in the Balcony," Robert becomes unpopular when he gives a thumbs down to a prominent black filmmaker's new movie because of his consistently negative portrayal of African-Americans. Meanwhile, Zaria dates her opinionated classmate Shakim.
37	2	"Our Gang"	Gerren Keith	Rushion McDonald & J. Anthony Brown	September 15, 1996	466052	4.4
Nicholas is being bullied and shaken down by "a bunch of baggy-pants, bandana wearin' hoodlums" and figures the only way to beat them may be to join them. That is, until he learns about their gang initiation.
38	3	"Voice in the 'Hood"	Glynn R. Turman	Danny Smith	September 22, 1996	466054	3.9
Michael auditions female singers for his band, and the front-runner is Zaria's annoying friend Theresa.
39	4	"Love, African-American Style"	Gerren Keith	Greg Fields	September 29, 1996	466053	3.7
Wendell has romantic designs on Karen, an interior decorator working at the Peterson house, so Robert decides to play Cupid. Meanwhile, Cece calls on big brother Nicholas to champion her against school bully Daniel.
40	5	"Inspiration"	Glynn R. Turman	Barry "Berry" Douglas	October 6, 1996	466055	4.5
Michael thinks he might be able to clear up his songwriter's block by smoking some marijuana that he received from a jazz trumpeter. Meanwhile, Nicholas gets upset when Arnie and his other friends taunt Nicholas because he's not good at sports.
41	6	"Labor Daze"	Glynn R. Turman	Al Sonja L. Rice	October 13, 1996	466056	3.9
Upset when her parents refuse to front her the cash for a pair of expensive running shoes, Zaria takes a second job at a clothing store where she discovers the wonderful world of buying on credit. Olympic gold medalist Gail Devers plays herself.
42	7	"Clothes Call"	Glynn R. Turman	Al Sonja L. Rice	October 20, 1996	466058	4.6
Against their better judgment, Robert and Jerri allow daughter Zaria to wear a revealing dress to a dance, where the teen finds that her "hoochie-mama get-up" may be sending the wrong message and attracting the wrong type of guy. Meanwhile, Wendell continues to court Karen. When he learns that she wants a man who likes children, he sets out to prove it by taking her and the Petersons' younger children to a fancy restaurant. Chaos results when the children let lobsters loose.
43	8	"Nick the Brick"	Glynn R. Turman	Mark Fink	November 3, 1996	466057	3.7
Nicholas has been having a ball playing on a losing basketball team. But when Robert takes over as coach, the fun is done even when the wins come. Meanwhile, Michael and his friend Theresa are confused about their feelings for each other after they unexpectedly share a few kisses.
44	9	"Chimney Boy"	Gerren Keith	Greg Fields	November 10, 1996	466059	4.0
With Robert and Jerri bedridden with the flu, Wendell volunteers to baby-sit. But during his watch, Nicholas gets stuck in the chimney while trying to free a trapped bird. R&B group Immature has a cameo.
45	10	"Goodfella"	Paul Miller	Barry "Berry" Douglas	November 17, 1996	466060	3.9
Wendell is too terrified to go to the police after he witnesses a crime. Robert urges him to provide a good role model for Nicholas, who is writing an essay on heroes. After cooperating, Wendell learns the chief suspect is associated with organized crime, and hides out in the Peterson home. Meanwhile, Daniel decides he wants Zaria as his new girlfriend.
46	11	"The Parade-y Bunch"	Robert Townsend	Danny Smith	November 24, 1996	466061	4.4
Robert and Jerri take the kids on a pilgrimage downtown to stake out a spot to view the Thanksgiving parade, but Robert and Wendell get taken by street cardsharks and wind up being arrested. Meanwhile, Jerri and the kids are looked out for by a kind homeless man.
47	12	"Fight the Power"	Robert Townsend	Rushion McDonald	December 8, 1996	466063	3.0
Activists Zaria and Shakim disagree over how to organize a protest against a company that's polluting a river. Meanwhile, Nicholas wants a dog and tries to convince his parents he's ready for responsibility by "caring" for a loaf of bread.
48	13	"Baby Oprah"	Paul Miller	Mark Fink	January 12, 1997	466062	3.66
The Petersons "could be working for the next Oprah" when Cece gets her own talk show sponsored by a toy company. But her talent for being "refreshingly honest" may be more than the company's president bargained for when he insists she endorse a new toy. Meanwhile, Theresa wins two tickets to a great concert, but must decide who will accompany her: new boyfriend Michael, or best friend Zaria.
49	14	"Home Loan"	Paul Miller	Greg Fields	January 19, 1997	466066	3.82
While the Petersons are out of town at a wedding, Wendell tries to make a good impression on Karen's parents by telling them the Petersons' house is really his and they are welcome to spend the night. All goes well until the Petersons arrive home a day early....
50	15	"A Star is Torn"	Robert Townsend	Steve Chivers & Curt Shepard	February 2, 1997	466065	3.37
Michael and Theresa impress record execs at a musicians' showcase, so much so that one of them is offered a contract—Theresa. Meanwhile, Wendell bets on basketball games using Cece as his lucky charm.
51	16	"Nick the Player"	Paul Miller	Al Sonja L. Rice	February 9, 1997	466064	3.39
Nicholas works the playground and accidentally smooth talks himself into two dates—for the same afternoon. Meanwhile, Wendell thinks he's inherited a fortune and happily spends the money in advance.
52	17	"Double Date"	Paul Miller	Mark Fink	February 16, 1997	466069	3.84
Wendell claims that he met Peabo Bryson while working as a part-time cabbie, and that he's been invited to Atlantic City to attend Bryson's concert. But when the Petersons reluctantly accompany him, they find the promised free tickets have not materialized. Meanwhile, left to care for their younger siblings, Michael and Zaria decide to hire a babysitter instead.
53	18	"Tango & Cash"	Robert Townsend	Rushion McDonald	February 23, 1997	466068	3.79
Shakim insists on driving old flame Alexis home from a party, and the resulting misunderstanding leads to a rift in his relationship with Zaria—until she learns Alexis has a drinking problem. Meanwhile, Nicholas and Cece find money in the street but don't realize it is counterfeit.
54	19	"When Robert Met Jerri"	Paul Miller	Anthony C. Hill	April 27, 1997	466070	2.75
With Zaria's senior prom approaching, Robert and Jerri are reminded how their school dance turned into a magical night—even though they didn't go together. To this day, it still bothers Robert that he never got to ask her to the big event; so Wendell and the kids come up with a plan to rectify the situation. R&B group The O'Jays guest stars as Themselves.
55	20	"The Peterson Redemption"	Paul Miller	Barry "Berry" Douglas	May 4, 1997	466067	2.67
The last time Robert saw Parris, the elder Peterson brother was doing time in prison. Now he's out and visiting the family, but Robert thinks Parris has some kind of scam cooking, especially after some appliances mysteriously disappear. Meanwhile, Michael is upset when Nicholas continually breaks his big brother's possessions.
56	21	"Mother and Law"	Loretha Jones	Lisa Payton	May 11, 1997	466072	1.93
On the eve of Jerri's graduation from law school, her "stay-at-home, full-service" mother Elizabeth objects to her putting career before family, and announces that she is moving in as a full-time housekeeper. Meanwhile, Wendell gets bad news over the psychic hotline.
57	22	"Rappin' It Up"	Gerren Keith	Greg Fields & Al Sonja L. Rice	May 18, 1997	466071	2.35
Zaria is surprised to overhear Skye professing his love for her, just after learning that boyfriend Shakim is heading off to college earlier than expected. And in a fantasy sequence, her Frankensteinish father thinks he's created the perfect guys—Gary Coleman and singer Tevin Campbell (who appear as themselves). Meanwhile, Wendell enters a Bugs Bunny stamp essay contest for kids using Nicholas' name. Note: This is the last episode with Kenny Blank as Michael Peterson.

=== Season 4 (1997–98) ===
No. overall	No. in season	Title	Directed by	Written by	Original release date	Prod. code	Viewers (millions)
58	1	"House Arrest"	Gerren Keith	Barry "Berry" Douglas	September 7, 1997	466751	3.43
Sixteen-year-old T.K. tries to steal from the Petersons and Jerri decides to save him from the criminal justice system. She brings him into the Peterson home as Robert thinks Jerri is trying to replace Michael, who left for college. Note: First appearance of Tyrone Burton as T.K. Anderson.
59	2	"Curfew-sion"	Loretha Jones	Greg Fields	September 14, 1997	466754	2.82
T.K.'s stay is negatively affecting the younger kids: he's got Nicholas and Cece talking trash and flashing gang signs. Meanwhile, Wendell tutors the high school basketball star Big Mo, hoping the student will turn professional and repay Wendell's kindness with a generous sum of money.
60	3	"No Soul on Ice"	Robert Townsend	Al Sonja L. Rice	September 21, 1997	466753	3.10
Nicholas faces off against a racist hockey coach who believes that the game is "not the sport for (black) people." Meanwhile, Zaria to impress members of the art club to get a scholarship, and T.K. looks for an easy way to succeed in school by having a girl in class write his history paper.
61	4	"Beauty Call"	Gerren Keith	Steve Chivers & Curt Shepard	September 28, 1997	466752	3.12
Zaria tries to become part of an elite, all-girls social group at school, but the price of admission may be too much for her conscience to bear: as part of an initiation rite she must date a nerd, but finds herself genuinely charmed by him. Meanwhile, Nicholas and Cece try to help Wendell get a line on his love life by hooking him up with a dial-a-date service they saw advertised on TV.
62	5	"Wendell and I Spy"	Robert Townsend	Lamont Ferrell & Norman Vance Jr.	October 5, 1997	466755	3.41
After Robert hesitates to call T.K. on his need to have a personal pager, he overhears the boy making a deal to have some "stuff" delivered to the Peterson house. Meanwhile, Zaria takes a job as her mother's legal aide, and Jerri discovers that Nicholas and Cece have sorted her legal briefs with sticky finger.
63	6	"Father Wendell"	Gerren Keith	Eunetta T. Boone	October 12, 1997	466756	3.24
Robert and Jerri smell a rat when Wendell's former lover (Dawnn Lewis) show up claiming he's the father of her 10-year-old son. Meanwhile, T.K. attempts to protect Zaria when she expresses a romantic interest in his oversexed friend Devaughn.
64	7	"Zaria Peterson's Day Off"	Gerren Keith	T. Faye Griffin	October 26, 1997	466757	3.36
Kellita Smith - Zaria recruits T.K. to help spy on her father, whom she suspects is having an affair. Meanwhile, after learning that with weddings come bountiful gifts, Cece decides to marry her young boyfriend Jesse.
65	8	"The Play's the Thang"	Robert Townsend	Barry "Berry" Douglas	November 2, 1997	466759	2.38
Nicholas writes a play for the school arts festival, but has problems with the star—Wendell—who wants to make his role as a giant even bigger. Meanwhile, with Jerri away at a law seminar, much to the horror of her siblings Zaria must assume the cooking duties.
66	9	"Don't Go There"	Loretha Jones	Steve Chivers & Curt Shepard	November 9, 1997	466758	3.93
When Nicholas' best friend Drew is abducted from school, Nicholas refuses to leave the house for fear he will be next. Meanwhile, Zaria conducts a study of men for her psychology class using T.K. and Wendell as subjects.
67	10	"Fast Cash"	Robert Townsend	Eunetta T. Boone	November 16, 1997	466760	4.78
When T.K. gets a job at a pizza place, two of his old street homeys smell a target for a holdup, and try to get T.K. to cut them in for a slice of the action. Also, aspiring magician Nicholas's assistants have a little something up their sleeves when he refuses to share with them the profits from his show.
68	11	"Bad Rap"	Gerren Keith	Al Sonja L. Rice	November 23, 1997	466761	3.11
Zaria's lovestruck friend Jasmine is making beautiful music with her new rap-star boyfriend, but his act hits a sour note with Zaria when he hits on her. Also, Robert and Jerri go on a game show to try and win a trip to Europe for the entire family, including "Uncle" Wendell.
69	12	"Me and Ms. Robinson"	Robert Townsend	Jesse Collins	December 7, 1997	466763	3.82
Nick and T.K. have crushes on older women—the former on Zaria's friend Jamie (Stephanie Charles), the latter on Jerri's new intern.
70	13	"Money Shot"	Loretha Jones	Lamont Ferrell & Norman Vance Jr.	January 11, 1998	466764	3.07
Racketeer Sonny offers T.K. big money to throw the next basketball game; Nicholas tries to manipulate Cece and Jesse and profit from their cupcake-selling business.
71	14	"Stand by Boo"	Robert Townsend	Barry "Berry" Douglas	January 18, 1998	466765	2.71
T.K.'s friend Boo, who's "the smartest high-school dropout (he) knows," prepares for her general-equivalency diploma with help from Robert - but not from her skeptical dad. Meanwhile, Cece is promoted to a gifted class taught by substitute Wendell.
72	15	"A Sister Scorned"	Gerren Keith	Greg Fields	February 1, 1998	466762	4.31
Jerri's now beautiful fashion-photographer sister Celeste develops a plan to get back at Wendell, who incessantly taunted her when she was a homely high-schooler. Meanwhile, T.K. promises to help the kids with a science project but gets sidetracked by Jesse's comely sister Vivica. Note: This is the last episode with Faizon Love as Wendell Wilcox.
73	16	"Flaked Out"	Gerren Keith	Steve Chivers & Curt Shepard	February 8, 1998	466766	3.88
Zaria's special 17th birthday outing turns into a real disaster - a natural one - after a blizzard hits, stranding her and her girlfriends at the Peterson house. The party is saved by a surprise visit from R&B star Usher.
74	17	"Color Him Father"	Loretha Jones	Eunetta T. Boone	February 15, 1998	466767	3.77
T.K. doesn't want to attend the basketball team's Father & Son banquet because his father has been in jail for the past 10 years. Meanwhile Zariah is considering going into music.
75	18	"I Want My Z-TV"	Robert Townsend	Jesse Collins	February 22, 1998	466769	4.31
Zaria becomes "the voice of teenage America" as host of a New York-based TV talk show aimed at fellow high-schoolers. But success may be going to Zaria's head when she decides to drop out. Also, almost everyone in the house is missing money at the same time that T.K. starts showing up with new threads and jewelry.
76	19	"An Affair to Forget"	Robert Townsend	Lamont Ferrell & Norman Vance Jr.	March 1, 1998	466768	3.96
On an awards show telecast, a famous singer credits Robert with teaching her "all about love and passion." Meanwhile, flirtatious T.K. gives Zaria's socially inept friend Gordon lessons in dating.
77	20	"Hurricane Linda"	Gerren Keith	Michael Fry	April 26, 1998	466772	2.60
Things get tense when Jerri's best friend Linda blows into town and meddles in everything about the Peterson household.
78	21	"Here Comes Z Bride"	Loretha Jones	Al Sonja L. Rice	May 3, 1998	466770	2.93
Zaria and her new boyfriend decide to get married. Meanwhile Nicholas wants to try boxing.
79	22	"'Hood Sweet 'Hood: Part 1"	Gerren Keith	T. Faye Griffin	May 17, 1998	466771	3.28
T.K. ponders violence after being assaulted in front of Nicholas. He gets a gun and threatens to shoot Stone (De'Aundre Bonds), but Robert talks him out of it. The two get ready to leave as Stone aims his gun at the both of them and fires. Meanwhile Cece fights with Skylar over the affections of Jesse. R&B singer Tyrese guest stars.

=== Season 5 (1999) ===
No. overall	No. in season	Title	Directed by	Written by	Original release date	Prod. code	Viewers (millions)
80	1	"'Hood Sweet 'Hood: Part 2"	Robert Townsend	Warren Hutcherson	May 30, 1999	467752	1.81
Trying to stop T.K.'s revenge on the thugs who robbed him, Robert is shot (in an embarrassing part of his anatomy), hits his head and lapses into a coma. Angry Jerri decides it is time T.K. was removed from the Peterson home; and an angel named Max appears to convey Robert to Heaven. Just as a tearful T.K. comes to Robert's bedside to beg his forgiveness, Robert recovers, and all is forgiven
81	2	"Front Window"	Robert Townsend	Al Sonja L. Rice	June 6, 1999	467751	2.12
Kelly spots Robert's neighbor hoisting strange bags out of the house and become convinced he is a murderer. Meanwhile, T.K. tries to shed his streetwise image for a more conservative one—which the other kids hate.
82	3	"Talkin' Trash"	Loretha Jones	Darryl Quarles	June 13, 1999	467753	2.91
When Zaria loses her deejay gig to T.K.'s less positive but more popular style, Robert takes action. Meanwhile, Jerri lets Robert's brother Kelly play plumber, despite Robert's doubts about Kelly's competence.
83	4	"Poco-No-No"	Loretha Jones	Steve Chivers & Curt Shepard	June 20, 1999	467754	2.0
Zaria convinces her parents to let her go to the Poconos unsupervised. But her parents-free, girls-only weekend seems headed for trouble when unexpected visitors crash the party. Meanwhile, Nicholas schemes to find the cash to buy a pricey pair of sneakers.
84	5	"Mommy Dearest"	Robert Townsend	T. Faye Griffin	June 27, 1999	467756	2.02
T.K.'s mother L'Tonya shows up after eight years and wants to take the boy home with her, but Jerri isn't sure that L'Tonya has shaken her former drug habit for good. Meanwhile, Kelly dumps his girlfriend Traci but can't seem to shake her voodoo curse.
85	6	"Deserving Honors"	Loretha Jones	Nguyen Orange & Tracey Rice	June 27, 1999	467757	2.39
Zaria tries to console her friend Simone, a teenage single mother whose award and scholarship are rescinded. Meanwhile, Kelly's latest moneymaking scheme is to act as a manager for second-rate entertainers, including a ventriloquist and the world's oldest living gymnast.
86	7	"Integrity to Block"	Robert Townsend	Jesse Collins	July 4, 1999	467758	1.22
Kelly gains new respect when he does well on the quiz show "Deep Knowledge," until Robert learns he wasn't exactly using an ethical approach. Meanwhile, Cece and her pal Jesse hatch a scheme to get her parents to let him move in.
87	8	"Old Men Can't Jump"	Robert Townsend	Al Sonja L. Rice	July 4, 1999	467759	1.28
Robert and Kelly resort to using a ringer to save themselves from almost certain defeat in an upcoming basketball match. Meanwhile, Jerri faces unintended consequences after telling Cece and Nicholas never to lie.
88	9	"To Kiss or Not to Kiss"	Robert Townsend	Lamont Ferrell & Norman Vance Jr.	July 11, 1999	467755	2.06
Zaria and T.K. must share an embarrassing passionate kiss in the senior play or fail the course. Meanwhile, Nicholas adopts a "bad boy" attitude in hopes of attracting classmate Monica.
89	10	"Something About Queenie"	Loretha Jones	Greg Fields	July 18, 1999	467760	1.92
T.K. and Kelly find themselves in the doghouse when an unexpected turn of events disrupts their plan to neutralize Queenie, visiting Aunt Josephine's mean pet. Meanwhile, Zaria fumes when Robert's editing of her valedictory speech leaves no trace of her personality.
90	11	"Wedding Bell Blues"	Robert Townsend	Darryl Quarles	July 25, 1999	467761	2.40
Jerri's sister Celeste pays a visit and unintentionally strains Robert and Jerri's marriage with her extravagant suggestions for their 20th anniversary party and Zaria and T.K. find themselves riding to the rescue.
