= Black Listed =

- DVD cover
- Directed by: Robert Townsend
- Written by: Robert Townsend
- Produced by: Graig Hutchison
- Starring: Robert Townsend
- Cinematography: Charles Mills
- Production company: Greenlight Productions
- Distributed by: York Entertainment
- Release date: January 21, 2003
- Running time: 95 minutes
- Country: United States
- Language: English

Black Listed is a 2003 crime drama film directed by, and starring, Robert Townsend.

== Premise ==
Lawyer Alan Chambers (Robert Townsend) grows tired of watching criminals being released and takes it upon himself to create a list of criminals, he feels should be put to death. He sends it to his closest friends, only to find later that the killing has already begun without his involvement.

== Cast ==
- Robert Townsend as Alan Chambers
- Harry Lennix as Karl Bennett
- Vanessa Estelle Williams as J.W.
- Calvin Levels as Trouble Truman
- Eugene Lee as Derrick Cox
- Dick Anthony Williams as Missouri
- John Dennis Johnston as Lt. Rayson
- Keith Amos as Kushon Barnes
- Richard Lawson as Agent Gordon
- Victoria Rowell as Patricia Chambers
- Kore'n Anderson as Speed
- Derrick Jones as Jail House
- Bobby McGee as Officer Gaby
- Gary Clancy as Officer Shamrock
- Angelle Brooks as Marcella
