= Learn to Read =

1987 American adult educational television series

- Genre: Educational
- Written by: Guy Mendes; Alan Garinger
- Directed by: Jerry Rimmer; Janet Whitaker
- Presented by: Wally Amos
- Starring: Doris Biscoe; Charlotte Scot; Les Raebel; Sylvia Glover; Jim Johnson
- Theme music composer: Dennis Carnevale
- Composer: Dennis Carnevale
- Country of origin: United States
- Original language: English
- No. of seasons: 1
- No. of episodes: 30

Production
- Producer: Guy Mendes
- Production locations: Detroit, Michigan; Lexington, Kentucky
- Camera setup: Multi-camera
- Running time: 30 minutes
- Production companies: KET; WXYZ-TV

Original release
- Network: PBS / syndicated
- Release: August 31, 1987

Related
- Another Page

Learn To Read is a 1987 adult educational TV series that consists of 30 programs, hosted by entrepreneur and literacy advocate Wally Amos, who previously hosted the reading section of the network's second GED on TV series in 1985. Co-instructors include Doris Biscoe (who was an anchorwoman for WXYZ-TV in Detroit, Michigan) and Charlotte Scot. Caitlyn Jenner (Note: Jenner changed her name from Bruce to Caitlyn during gender transition in 2015.) guest-starred on the first episode. The series was based on 27 million Americans having almost no reading skills.

Learn to Read was produced by Kentucky Educational Television in association with WXYZ-TV (the copyright is owned by both KET and E.W. Scripps, originally known as Scripps Howard Broadcasting), funded by the Kmart Corporation, the Corporation for Public Broadcasting and financial contributions to PBS. The program was produced at WXYZ's studios in Southfield, Michigan, with additional production done at KET studios in Lexington, Kentucky. The program was televised on many PBS member stations, and syndicated to commercial stations. In Detroit, the program was seen locally on WXYZ-TV, generally weekday mornings at 5AM.

== Format ==
On Friday, there is a review of each week. The final program reviews the entire series. In every episode (except programs 1, 5, 10, 15 and 30) there is a "Getting Along" segment, either with Sylvia Glover or Jim Johnson (both formerly of WXYZ's Good Afternoon Detroit) as instructors. Also, there's Les the Letter Man and Nancy the Word Woman. Finally, there is Billy Green, referred to as the "Book Guy", telling viewers to get their workbook.

== Episode status ==
While episodes originally consist of a 6-week daily course, some stations air episodes on a less-frequent basis, as little as once a week. New York City PBS station WNET was the final PBS member station to air the show and aired it daily (occasionally twice daily) before pulling it from its lineup in 2009.

The first episode is available on YouTube.

== Broadcasts ==
Initially, Learn To Read was produced solely at WXYZ-TV in Detroit. It was originally offered free to all ABC affiliated television stations in the United States by VP/General Manager Jeanne Findlater, who created the idea and wrote the format. She sold the whole underwriting costs to Chrysler, K-Mart, Kroger, and McDonald's after convincing them that they had to use their commercial time to promote literacy but not their products. On behalf of the station, she got the national Charles W. Scripps Literacy Award which Barbara Bush presented.

Learn To Read was later syndicated to PBS state network Kentucky Educational Television. KET marketed it throughout the United States. In the first broadcast, Findlater scheduled the program at 5:30 am, and at 10:00 am. The idea for the early morning time slot was conceived by Doug Frazier years before. Frazier, then president of the UAW-CIO, urged Findlater to create a literacy series and run it after or before a work-shift. Findlater said ratings for the early morning slot were not available, but many letters sent to her indicated that those viewers did not want their kids to understand they could not read. The series was widely used in prisons. Estimates of total viewership (from 2002) were more than 18 million people.

== Cast ==
- Wally Amos as the host
- Doris Biscoe as a co-instructor
- Charlotte Scot as a co-instructor
- Sylvia Glover as herself, in some Getting Along segments
- Jim Johnson as himself, in some Getting Along segments
- Billy Green as himself
- Les Raebel as Les the Letter Man

== Spinoff ==
In late 1987, KET produced a follow-up series, Another Page, a similar literacy program for intermediate-level readers. That program premiered in February 1988.

== See also ==
- Operation Alphabet
- A Place of Our Own
