= Wally Amos =

American television personality, entrepreneur, and author (1936–2024)

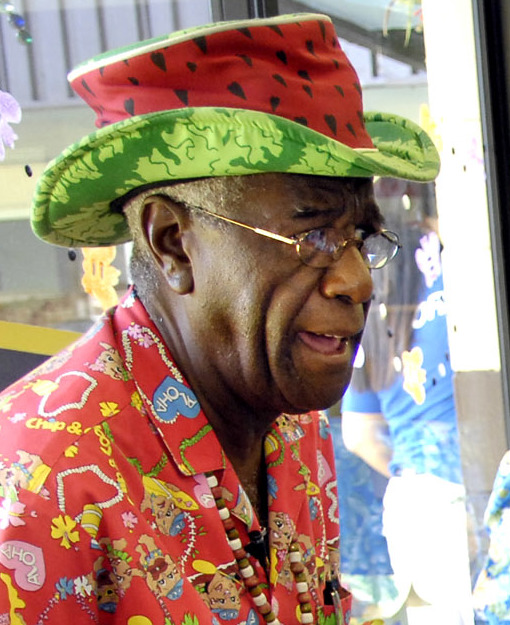
- Amos in 2007
- Born: Wallace Amos Jr. July 1, 1936; Tallahassee, Florida, U.S.
- Died: August 13, 2024 (aged 88); Honolulu, Hawaii, U.S.
- Other name: Famous Amos
- Occupations: Businessman; writer
- Years active: 1954–2018
- Known for: Famous Amos; Learn to Read
- Spouse: 5
- Children: 4

Signature
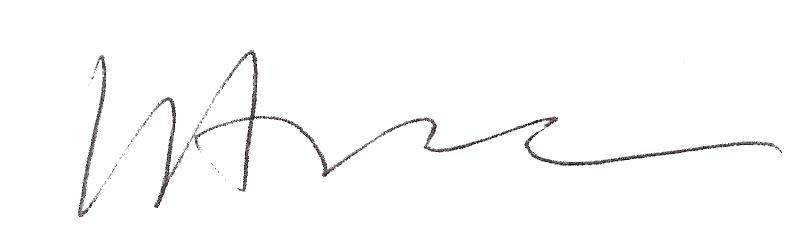

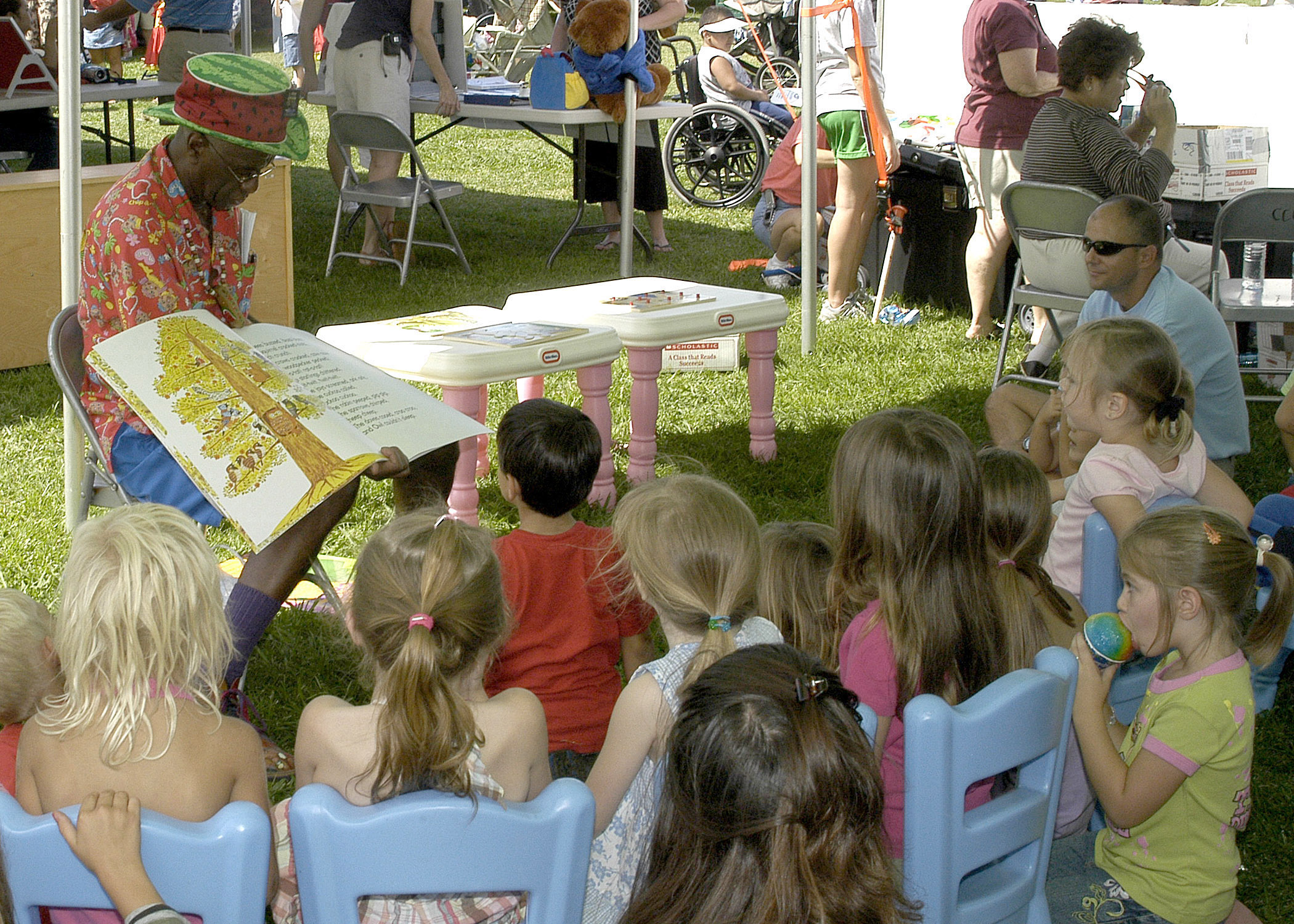
Wally Amos reading to children during Springfest at Naval Station Pearl Harbor, 2007

Wallace Amos Jr. (July 1, 1936 – August 13, 2024) was an American writer and businessman. He was the founder of the Famous Amos chocolate chip cookie, the Cookie Kahuna, and Aunt Della's Cookies gourmet cookie brands. He was also the host of the adult reading programs Learn to Read.

== Early life ==
Wallace Amos Jr. was born July 1, 1936, to Wallace and Ruby Amos. He was born and raised in Tallahassee, Florida, until he was 12 years old. When his parents divorced, he moved to New York City with his aunt, where he enrolled at the Food Trades Vocational High School. He showed his interest in cooking at a young age. It was from his aunt Della Bryant, who would bake cookies for him, that Amos later developed his chocolate chip cookie recipe.

Amos dropped out of high school to join the United States Air Force. He served at Hickam Air Force Base in Honolulu, Hawaii, from 1954 until 1957. He earned his high school equivalency diploma before being honorably discharged from the military.

== Career ==
Returning to New York City, Amos took classes to become a secretary and took a mailroom clerk job with the William Morris Agency. Eventually, he became the agency's first African American talent agent. He signed Simon & Garfunkel and headed the agency's rock 'n' roll department. Amos attracted clients by sending them chocolate chip cookies along with an invitation to visit him. The musicians he represented included The Temptations and Marvin Gaye.

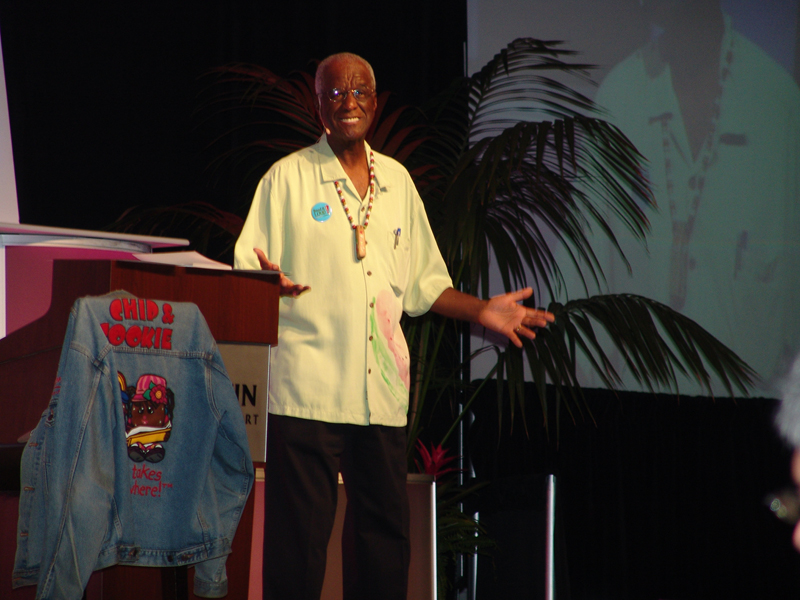
Amos attending Mark Victor Hansen's MEGA Marketing Seminar in 2006

In 1975, a friend suggested to Amos that he set up a store to sell his cookies. In March of that year, the first Famous Amos cookie store opened in Los Angeles, California. He started the business with the help of a $25,000 loan from Marvin Gaye and Helen Reddy. The company began to expand, and eventually, Famous Amos chocolate chip cookies could be found on supermarket shelves across the United States. He became such a known figure culturally that he appeared as himself in the Taxi episode "Latka's Cookies", in 1981. Thanks in part to the success of his cookie company, he was hired to deliver speeches. He wrote several books, many of which have a self-help theme, including The Cookie Never Crumbles and The Power in You.

In 1979, Amos's long-time friend and publicist John Rosica introduced him to Literacy Volunteers of America. Amos advocated literacy and helped thousands of adults learn to read. In 1987, he also hosted a television series designed to teach others how to read, entitled Learn to Read, produced by Kentucky Educational Television and WXYZ-TV. The following year, Amos also hosted an updated revision of Another Page, another KET-produced reading program.

In 1986, Amos was awarded the Entrepreneurial Excellence Award by President Ronald Reagan at the White House Conference on Small Business.

Due to financial troubles, Amos was forced to sell the Famous Amos Company in 1988. Because the name "Famous Amos" was trademarked by his former company, he had to use Uncle Noname's Cookie Company as his new company's name. A Famous Amos distributor at the time, Lou Avignone, heard Amos on a local radio talk show and contacted Amos with the idea for starting a new business. In 1994, the two became partners and subsequently launched Uncle Noname Gourmet Muffins. The company focused on fat-free, nutritious muffins. Uncle Noname became Uncle Wally's Muffin Company in 1999. The muffins were sold in more than 3,500 stores nationwide.

In 2014, an article in Fortune magazine lauded "The cookie comeback of 'Famous' Wally Amos" as Amos brought back his handmade cookies under a new name, The Cookie Kahuna. These cookies were marketed in a store in Hawaii, where Amos was based. They come in the flavors original chocolate chip, chocolate chip with pecans, and butterscotch with macadamia nuts. Amos appeared on the reality television show Shark Tank in October 2016, pitching Cookie Kahuna, but failed to get a deal. The business folded in 2018.

In 2019, Amos was called the "King of Cookies" by NBC affiliate KSNV in Las Vegas.

In 2020, Content Media Group released a documentary on the life of Wally Amos, The Great Cookie Comeback: reBaking Wally Amos. The film was directed by Jeff MacIntyre.

== Personal life ==
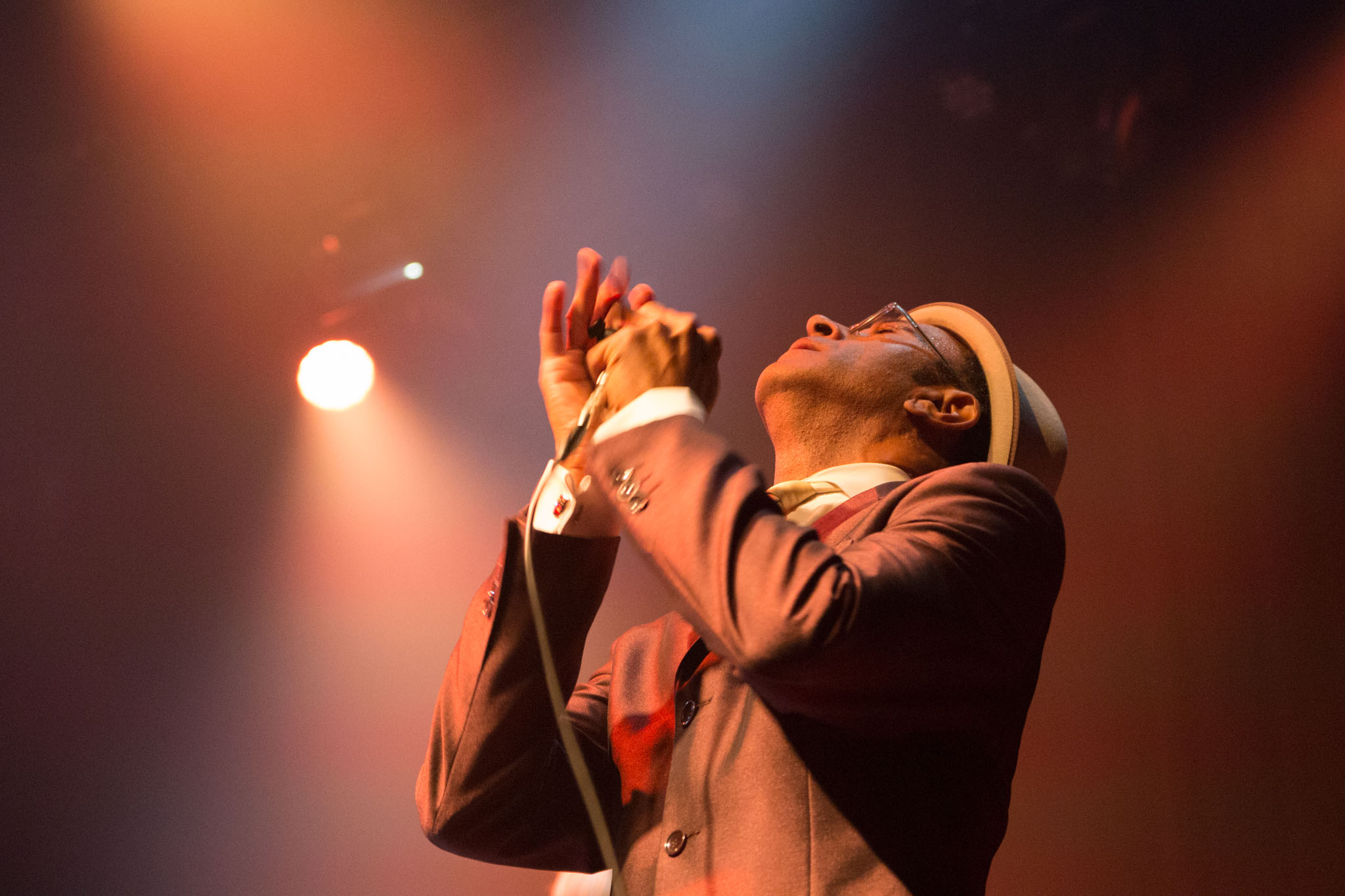
Shawn Amos

Amos was married five times, most recently to Carol Williams. He had four children: Michael Amos, Gregory Amos, Sarah Amos, and musician Shawn Amos. Amos lived in Hawaii from 1977 until 2018, and was again living in the state at the time of his death. He also lived in Columbia, South Carolina, where he was working on Aunt Della's Cookies until 2018.

Amos died due to complications from dementia at his home in Honolulu on August 13, 2024, at the age of 88.

== Publications ==
=== Author ===
- Amos, Wally; Robinson, Leroy (1983). The Famous Amos Story: The Face That Launched a Thousand Chips. Doubleday. ISBN 978-0385193788.
- Amos, Wally; Amos, Gregory (1988). The Power In You. Penguin Books. ISBN 978-1556110931.
- Amos, Wally; Kehret, Peg (1991). Wally Amos Presents Chip and Cookie: The First Adventure. Leslie Beaber (illustrator). Acropolis Books Inc. ISBN 978-0874919882.
- Amos, Wally; Denton, Camilla (1994). Man with No Name: Turn Lemons Into Lemonade. Aslan Pub. ISBN 978-0944031575.
- Amos, Wally; Murray, Eden-Lee (2002). The Cookie Never Crumbles: Practical Recipes for Everyday Living. St. Martin's Griffin. ISBN 978-0312304980.
- Amos, Wally (2006). Be Positive! Insights On How To Live An Inspiring And Joy Filled Life. Blue Mountain Press. ISBN 978-1598420685.
- Amos, Wally; Glauberman, Stu (2006). Live an Inspiring Life: 10 Secret Ingredients for Inner Strength. Blue Mountain Arts, Inc. ISBN 978-1598421675.
- Amos, Wally; Glauberman, Stu (2006). The Power of Self-Esteem. Blue Mountain Arts Inc. ISBN 978-1598421705.
- Amos, Wally; Glauberman, Stu (2008). Watermelon Magic: Seeds Of Wisdom, Slices Of Life. Jack Canfield (foreword). Atria Books/Beyond Words. ISBN 978-1416598534.
- Amos, Wally; Glauberman, Stu (2008). The Path to Success Is Paved with Positive Thinking: How to Live a Joy-Filled Life and Make Your Dreams Come True. Blue Mountain Arts Inc. ISBN 978-1598422573.
- Amos, Wally (2010). Watermelon Credo: The Book. Suzanne Hallerman (illustration). Credo Press. ISBN 978-0615349473.

=== Contributor ===
==== Print books ====
- Thomas, R. David; Walton, Sam (1993). Higher Than the Top: What Do These People Have In Common? They Dynamic Faith. Dave Thomas, Orville Redenbacher, Wally Amos, Gayle Miller, Bill Bowerman. Dimensions for Living. ISBN 978-0687170029.
- Hansen, Mark Victor; Amos, Wally; Tracy, Brian (2002). Mission Possible!: Volume One. Insight Publishing Company. ISBN 978-1885640840.
- Cathy, S. Truett; Tracy, Brian; Amos, Wally (2003). Conversations on Success. Insight Publishing. ISBN 978-1885640123.
- Dunston, Marc (2010). The Magic of Giving (children's book). Katie Cantrell (illustrator), Wally Amos (foreword). Pelican. ISBN 978-1589808058.

==== Audiobooks ====
- Amos, Wally (1998). Let Go, Let God (Audio book). Unity School of Christianity. ISBN 978-0871598424.
- Amos, Wally (2001). Faith: Inspirational Messages (Audio book). ISBN 978-0871598677.

== Filmography ==
Year	Name	Type	Role	Notes
1980	The Jeffersons	Television sitcom	Man #1	Season 7, episode 3
1981	Taxi	Television sitcom	Himself	Episode: "Latka's Cookies"
1984	Sunset People	Documentary film	Himself	
1987	Learn to Read	Educational TV series	Host	
1987	Traxx	Movie	Himself	
1988	Another Page	Educational TV series	Host	
2001	Biography	Television documentary	Himself	Episode: "Famous Wally Amos: The Cookie King".
2012	The Office	Television sitcom	Himself	Episode: "Tallahassee"
2016	Shark Tank	Television reality show	Himself	Amos appeared in the October 6, 2016 episode, seeking $50,000 funding for 20% equity of his company "Cookie Kahuna". The Sharks all passed on the opportunity.
2018	The Great Cookie Comeback: Re-Baking Wally Amos	Documentary film	Himself	Released in February 2020, a documentary film on the life of Wally Amos, released by Content Media Group.
