= Townsend Television =

- Genre: Sketch/variety
- Starring: Robert Townsend; John Witherspoon; Barry Diamond; Paula Jai Parker
- Country of origin: United States
- Original language: English
- No. of seasons: 1
- No. of episodes: 10

Production
- Running time: 45 minutes

Original release
- Network: Fox
- Release: September 12 – December 26, 1993

Townsend Television is an American sketch comedy/variety show starring Robert Townsend who also served as the series’ executive producer. The series featured an ensemble cast including John Witherspoon, Barry Diamond and Paula Jai Parker and aired on Fox from September 12, 1993 to December 26, 1993.

== Overview ==
Each episode featured stand-up comedy from Robert Townsend. There were also musical numbers and comedy sketches, including spoofs of movies and commercials, performed by the regulars and guests.

== Regulars ==
- Robert Townsend
- John Witherspoon
- Barry Diamond
- Paula Jai Parker
- Roxanne Beckford
- Darrel Heath
- Lester Barrie
- Biz Markie
- The Paul Jackson Orchestra
- The Russel Clark Dancers
