= Diary of a Single Mom =

- Written by: Cheryl L. West
- Directed by: Robert Townsend
- Original language: English
- No. of seasons: 3
- No. of episodes: 26

Production
- Producer: Robert Townsend
- Production locations: Los Angeles, California
- Editor: Robert Pergament
- Production companies: One Economy, V Studio, Townsend Entertainment

Original release
- Release: January 27, 2009 - May 26, 2011

Diary of a Single Mom is a drama web series. This series is about three single mothers and their fight through obstacles while trying to get ahead.

== Cast ==
- Monica Calhoun as Ocean
- Valery M. Ortiz as Lupe
- Janice Lynde as Peggy
- Jonathan Biggs as Sammy
- Nieko Mann as Trina
- Billy Dee Williams as Uncle Bo

== Episodes ==
=== Season 1 ===
- Episode 1: "Life Raft"
- Episode 2: "School Maze"
- Episode 3: "Creating a Village"
- Episode 4: "Eyes Don't Lie"
- Episode 5: "Halloween Ghosts"
- Episode 6: "Aftermath"
- Episode 7: "Solstice"
- Episode 8: "Thanksgiving End"

=== Season 2 ===
- Episode 9: "Anybody for a Miracle?"
- Episode 10: "Trick Play"
- Episode 11: "Flexing"
- Episode 12: "The Meek Shall Inherit the Earth"
- Episode 13: "Hiding Out"
- Episode 14: "Snap-back"
- Episode 15: "Promise Keeper"
- Episode 16: "Emasculated"

=== Season 3 ===
- Episode 17: "By Omission"
- Episode 18: "Struggling or Surviving"
- Episode 19: "Running on Empty"
- Episode 20: "Burnt Beans"
- Episode 21: "The Gift of Rosary"
- Episode 22: "Aplomb"
- Episode 23: "Paradox"
- Episode 24: "In the Meantime"
- Episode 25: "Dream Cart"
- Episode 26: "Friday"

== Awards and recognition ==
At the 2010 Indie Soap Awards, the series won Best Web Series and Billy Dee Williams won Best Guest Actor for his appearance on the series. At the 2011 Indie Soap Awards, the series won Best Web Series again and Monica Calhoun won Outstanding Lead Actress. The series was nominated for 13 awards at the Indie Soap Awards that year.
