= Playin' for Love =

Playin' For Love
- Film poster
- Directed by: Robert Townsend
- Written by: Michelle Amor, Cheryl L. West, Robert Townsend
- Produced by: Jeff Friday, Lydia Nicole, Messiah Jacobs, Bobby McGee, Jason Price, Robert Townsend, Isiah Thomas
- Starring: Salli Richardson-Whitfield, Esai Morales, Jenifer Lewis, Robert Townsend
- Cinematography: John L. Demps Jr.
- Edited by: Robert Pergament
- Release dates: June 23, 2013 (American Black Film Festival); January 16, 2015
- Running time: 84 minutes
- Country: United States
- Language: English

Playin' for Love is a 2013 comedy film starring Salli Richardson-Whitfield and Robert Townsend and directed by Townsend. The film, produced by Townsend Entertainment, premiered in 2013 at the American Black Film Festival and released theatrically in the United States on January 16, 2015.

== Cast ==
- Salli Richardson-Whitfield as Talisa McCoy
- Esai Morales as Principle Jose Marti
- Jenifer Lewis as Alize Gates
- Lawrence Hilton-Jacobs as Coach Preston Reid
- Robert Townsend as Coach Banks
- Bobby McGee as Milton Dudley
- Melyssa Ford as Bella
- Steve White as Reesie
