= The Parent 'Hood =

American sitcom (1995–1999)

- Genre: Family sitcom
- Created by: Robert Townsend; Andrew Nicholls & Darrell Vickers
- Starring: Robert Townsend; Suzzanne Douglas; Kenny Blank; Reagan Gomez-Preston; Curtis Williams; Ashli Amari Adams; Bobby McGee; Carol Woods; Faizon Love; Tyrone Dorzell Burton; Kelly Perine
- Theme music composer: Monty Seward
- Composers: Christopher Tyng (seasons 1–3); Kenny Blank (seasons 3–5)
- Country of origin: United States
- Original language: English
- No. of seasons: 5
- No. of episodes: 90 (list of episodes)

Production
- Executive producers: Robert Townsend; Andrew Nicholls; Darrell Vickers; Dennis Rinsler; Marc Warren; Loretha Jones; Warren Hutcherson
- Camera setup: Videotape; Multi-camera
- Running time: 22–24 minutes
- Production companies: Highest Common Denominator Productions (Season 1); The Townsend Entertainment Company (Seasons 2–5); Warren & Rinsler Productions (Seasons 2–4); Warner Bros. Television

Original release
- Network: The WB
- Release: January 18, 1995 – July 25, 1999

The Parent 'Hood is an American sitcom television series that aired on The WB from January 18, 1995, to July 25, 1999. The series starred Robert Townsend and Suzzanne Douglas. Originally to be titled Father Knows Nothing (a parody of the title of the 1950s sitcom Father Knows Best), the series was one of the four sitcoms that aired as part of the original two-hour Wednesday night lineup that helped launch The WB (along with The Wayans Bros., Unhappily Ever After, and the short-lived Muscle).

From November 2021 to 2023, The Parent 'Hood streamed several episodes on HBO Max.

== Premise ==
The series revolves around a NYU Communications professor, Robert Peterson, who must cope with fatherhood after his wife, Jerri decides to return to the working field to their four children which they share in their brownstone townhouse in an upper middle class Manhattan neighborhood. Robert quickly learns that he needs to rule his house with an iron fist as he realizes the world his kids are growing up in was different from how he grew up.

== Cast ==
- Robert Townsend as Robert Peterson
- Suzzanne Douglas as Geraldine "Jerri" Peterson
- Kenny Blank as Michael Peterson (seasons 1–3)
- Reagan Gomez-Preston as Zaria Peterson
- Curtis Williams as Nicholas Peterson
- Ashli Amari Adams as Cecilia "CeCe" Peterson
- Bobby McGee as Derek Sawyer (season 1)
- Carol Woods as Mrs. Wilcox (season 1)
- Faizon Love as Wendell Wilcox (seasons 2–4, main; season 1, recurring)
- Tyrone Dorzell Burton as T.K. Anderson (seasons 4–5)
- Kelly Perine as Kelly Peterson (season 5)

== Episodes ==
Season	Episodes	Originally released	
Season	Episodes	First released	Last released
1	13	January 18, 1995	May 17, 1995
2	22	September 6, 1995	May 15, 1996
3	22	September 8, 1996	May 18, 1997
4	22	September 7, 1997	May 17, 1998
5	11	May 30, 1999	July 25, 1999
