= A Death in California =

- Original newspaper advertisement
- Genre: Crime drama
- Teleplay by: E. Jack Neuman
- Directed by: Delbert Mann
- Starring: Cheryl Ladd; Sam Elliott; Alexis Smith; Fritz Weaver
- Country of origin: United States
- Original language: English
- No. of episodes: 2

Production
- Running time: 188 minutes

Original release
- Network: ABC
- Release: May 12 – May 13, 1985

A Death in California is a 1985 American crime drama television miniseries directed by Delbert Mann and starring Cheryl Ladd, Sam Elliott, Alexis Smith, and Fritz Weaver. It follows a Beverly Hills socialite (Ladd) who experiences Stockholm syndrome over a psychotic killer (Elliott) after he murders her fiancé and then rapes and terrorizes her at a ranch in Tulare County, California. It is based on the 1981 book of the same name by Joan Barthel, which chronicled the real-life assault against Los Angeles socialite Hope Masters and the murder of her fiancé, Bill Ashlock, in 1973.

The series received some critical acclaim, and was nominated for two Primetime Emmy Awards.

== Cast ==
- Cheryl Ladd as Hope Masters
- Sam Elliott as D. Jordan Williams
- Alexis Smith as Honey Niven
- Fritz Weaver as Van Niven
- John Ashton as Det. Bob Swalwell
- Barry Corbin as Asst. Dist. Atty. Jim Heusdens
- Jim Haynie as Dob Fowler
- Kerrie Keane as Shannon Foley
- George Wyner as Joe Haley
- Chad Allen as Glenn
- Liam Sullivan as Ned Nelson
- Michael Cavanaugh as Gene Brooks
- Tom Fuccello as Tony Matteo
- Jennie Gassman as Nancy Ellen
- Joshua Harris as Tommy
- Michael Laskin as Bart Finch
- Lydia Nicole as Delores
- Don Dubbins as Rev. Pruitt
- Rance Howard as Ralph Lee
- Dick McGarvin as Clete Baker
- William Lucking as Dan Ward
- Granville Van Dusen as Richard Morgan
- Joel Polis as Tom Breslin
- John McLiam as Judge Carter
- Bruce Gray as Powell
- Richard Bull as Judge Leonard Ginsburg
- John Carter as Green
- Kenneth Tigar as Raymond

== Release ==
A Death in California premiered in two parts, the first airing on ABC on May 12, 1985, followed by the second on May 13, 1985.

=== Home media ===
The Warner Archive Collection released A Death in California on made-on-demand DVD on January 10, 2010.

== Reception ==
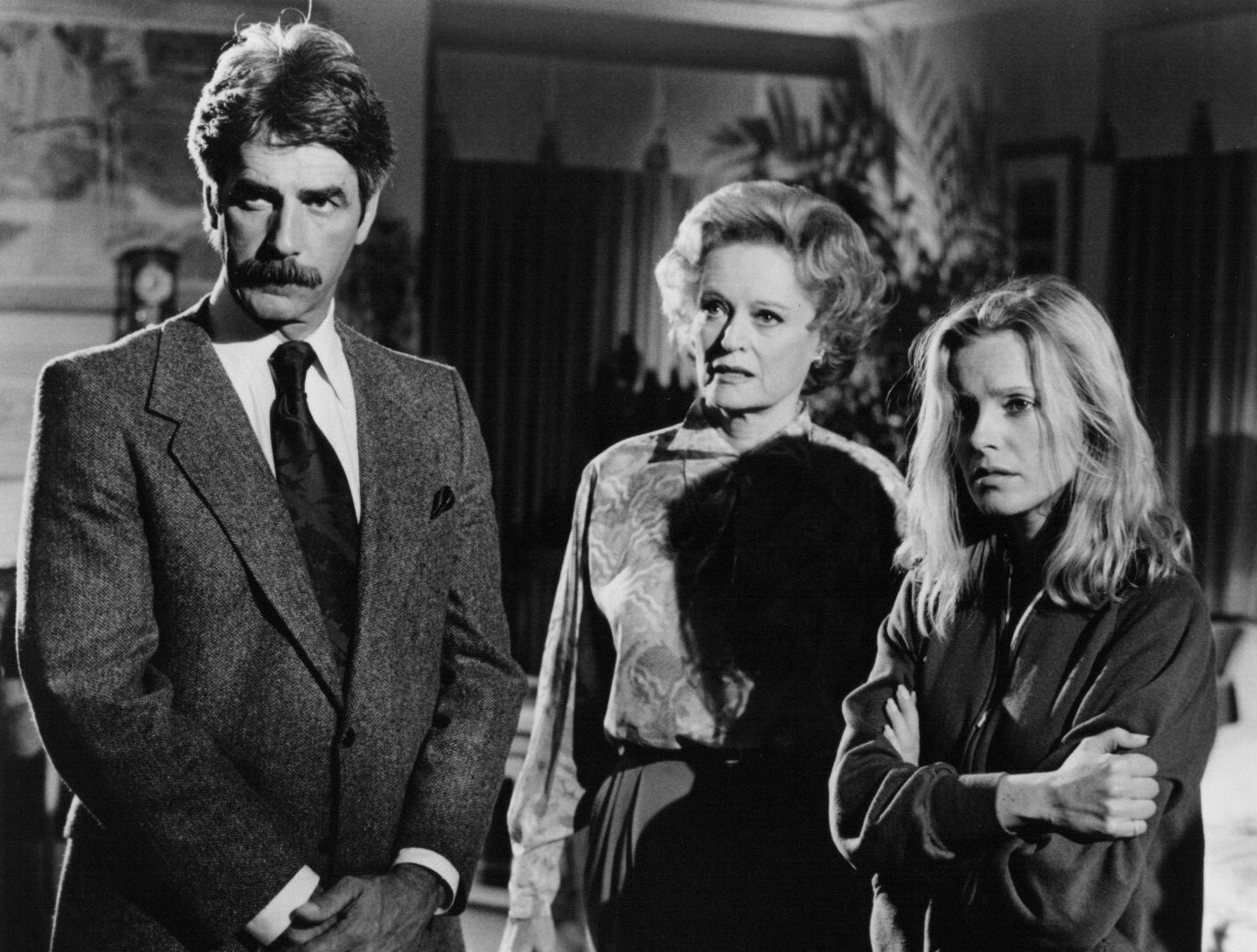
Sam Elliott, Alexis Smith, and Cheryl Ladd in a publicity still for A Death in California

=== Critical response ===
Lawrence Van Gelder of The New York Times praised Ladd and Elliot's lead performances, concluding: "At four hours—A Death in California... is slightly padded. But the story, which gets off to a violent beginning, possesses an eerie fascination throughout and maintains suspense to its chilling finish." Judy Flander of the United Feature Syndicate was also impressed by the lead performances, writing that Ladd "combines fragility with a misguided inner strength for her role. Sam Elliott is surely one of the most mesmerizing screen villains in recent years."

Joe Meyers of the Connecticut Post praised Ladd's performance and described the first part of the miniseries as "harrowing." However, he felt Elliott was miscast in his role, and also criticized the second part of the miniseries, which he felt narratively "falls apart." The Baltimore Sun's Bill Carter gave the film a mixed assessment, writing that Ladd "underplays throughout, almost to the point of bloodlessness. Elliott has it easier because he is mostly required to provide soulful mystery and unrelenting sex appeal. As a production, Death in California is not as taut as it should be, but overall as a psychological suspense story it works."

The Courier Journal's Tom Dorsey wrote that "Ladd finally breaks out of the gilded Charlie's Angels cage with the same kind of acting job that freed Farrah Fawcett from that image in The Burning Bed," but felt that, despite the series' strong performances, it's "a Ripley's-Believe-It-or-Not scenario from the start."

=== Accolades ===
Award/association	Year	Category	Recipient(s) and nominee(s)	Result	Ref.
Primetime Emmy Awards	1985	Outstanding Art Direction For A Limited Series Or A Special	Hub Braden; Don Remacle	Nominated	
Primetime Emmy Awards	1985	Outstanding Cinematography For A Limited Series Or A Special	Joseph Biroc	Nominated	
