= Mamta =

Mamta or Mamata may refer to:

== Films and television ==
- Mamta (1936 film), see Bollywood films of the 1930s
- Mamta (1942 film), a 1942 Indian film
- Mamta (1952 film), a 1952 Indian film
- Mamta (1965 film), see Bollywood films of 1965
- Mamta (1966 film), a 1966 Indian film by Asit Sen
- Mamta (TV series), a serial appearing on the Indian Zee TV satellite television network
- Mamata, a fictional character played by Mamata Shankar in the Indian films Agantuk (1991) and Agantuker Pore (2016)

== Given name ==
- Mamta Kulkarni, Indian actress in Hindi cinema
- Mamta Mohandas, Indian actress in South Indian cinema
- Mamta Sagar, Indian poet and playwright
- Mamata Bala Thakur, Indian politician, former Member of Parliament, Lok Sabha from Bangaon
- Mamata Banerjee, Indian politician, Chief Minister of West Bengal and former Member of Parliament, Lok Sabha
- Mamata Bhunia, Indian politician, member of the West Bengal Legislative Assembly
- Mamata Dash, Indian poet writing in Odia
- Mamata Mohanta, Indian politician, Member of Parliament, Rajya Sabha from Odisha
- Mamata Roy, Indian politician, former member of the West Bengal Legislative Assembly
- Mamata Shankar, Indian actress and classical dancer in Bengali cinema

== Other uses ==
- Mamta, Tibet

== See also ==
- Moumita (disambiguation)
