= The House of Dies Drear =

Children's mystery novel by Virginia Hamilton

The House Of Dies Drear
- First edition
- Author: Virginia Hamilton
- Illustrator: Eros Keith
- Language: English
- Series: Dies Drear
- Genre: Children's mystery fiction
- Publisher: Macmillan Publishers
- Publication date: 1968
- Publication place: United States
- Media type: Print (hardcover & paperback)
- Pages: 279 pp
- Awards: Edgar Award
- LC Class: PZ7.H1828 Ho
- Followed by: The Mystery of Drear House

The House of Dies Drear is a children's mystery novel by Virginia Hamilton, with sinister goings-on in a reputedly haunted house. It was published by Macmillan in 1968 with illustrations by Eros Keith. The novel received the 1969 Edgar Award for Best Juvenile Mystery. The House of Dies Drear is the first book in the Dies Drear Chronicles; the second is The Mystery of Drear House (1987).

== Setting ==
The story is set in Ohio, in 1968.

== Summary ==
Thomas Small is a 13-year-old African American boy, who has moved with his family from North Carolina to Ohio. His father is a history professor who has leased the historic home of the abolitionist Dies Drear. The house has been mostly empty for years, and is riddled with hidden passageways that were used to hide escaping slaves on the Underground Railroad. An elderly caretaker, named Mr. Pluto, lives in a cave on the property, which he has converted into a home. There are rumors that the house is haunted by the ghosts of two escaped slaves who were captured and killed, and by the ghost of Dies Drear himself.

After many strange happenings in the house, Thomas and his father find a secret passage leading to a cavern full of historic artwork, tapestries, glasswork, ledgers, and carvings. The Smalls' neighbors, the Darrows, have been looking for this collection for years. Mr. Pluto and Mr. Darrow's father were both descendants of escaped slaves who had passed through Dies Drear's house and later returned. Mr. Pluto feared that the Smalls would be like the Darrows and pose a threat to the historic artifacts in the cavern, but he now sees that Mr. Small has a great appreciation for history and can be trusted with the secret.

After the Darrows are driven off, Mr. Small helps Mr. Pluto catalog the artifacts in the cavern. They agree to keep the secret, at least until the cataloging is done and the collection is ready to show to the historical society. Thomas looks forward to starting school and making friends, possibly including young Mac Darrow.

== Subjects ==
Library of Congress Subject Headings for The House of Dies Drear are: African Americans, Mystery and detective stories, Underground Railroad, and Ohio-History.

== Television adaptation ==
The film was adapted into the 1984 television film The House of Dies Drear directed by Allan A. Goldstein.

== See also ==
- National Underground Railroad Freedom Center
