= Ludo Vika =

Dominican Republic actress

- Born: Milagros Padilla; July 7, 1955 (age 70); Santa Cruz, Barahona, Dominican Republic
- Occupations: actress, dancer, choreographer, comedian
- Years active: 1970s - present
- Spouse: Lonesome Dave Conrades
- Website: http://www.funnyludo.com http://www.ludovika.net

Ludo Vika (born July 7, 1955), sometimes credited as Ludo Vica, born Milagros Padilla, is a Dominican-born actress and comedian.

Born in the Dominican Republic, Ludo came from a working middle-class family. At age nine, she and her family emigrated to Puerto Rico in search of better opportunities and a new life. She became a staple of local television on the island, and by age 15 was a cast member of Iris Chacón's variety show, El Show de Iris Chacón (The Iris Chacón Show) .

In later years, she relocated to the United States where she succeeded in acting and stand-up comedy. First starting out in Las Vegas and later in Hollywood, Ludo guest starred on such shows as Beverly Hills, 90210, ER, The Steve Harvey Show, and In Living Color. She also served as a choreographer for Growing Pains spin-off sitcom, Just the Ten of Us in the late 1980s. She was also a regular cast member on the also Telemundo sitcoms ¡Viva Vegas! and Solo en America. Throughout the years she has made guest appearances on television programs including on the sitcom Hot Properties where she played the mother of Sofia Vergara's character.

Today, she resides in Los Angeles with her husband, local musician and actor Lonesome Dave Conrades where she is active in local productions that spotlights Latina comedians.
