= Jonathan McDaniel =

American actor (born 1985)

- Born: Jonathan Richard McDaniel; May 17, 1985 (age 41); Long Beach, California, U.S.
- Occupations: Actor; rapper
- Years active: 2000–present
- Height: 1.82 m (5 ft 11 1/2 in)
- Children: 3

Jonathan Richard McDaniel (born May 17, 1985), better known by his stage name Lil J, is an American actor and rapper. He is best known for his role as Devon Carter (Raven Baxter's boyfriend, and later ex-husband) on the hit Disney Channel shows That's So Raven and Raven's Home, as well as German Vega on VH1's Hit the Floor.

== Career ==
In 2002, he came on the music scene with his debut single "It's the Weekend" from his debut album All About J, which was also featured on the soundtrack of the movie Clockstoppers the same year. He later released a follow-up album the next year titled Back 2 J, which featured the single "Baby Girl".

During this period, he started his acting career, landing his noteworthy role on the Disney Channel series That's So Raven. He also appeared in the film Nora's Hair Salon which starred Jenifer Lewis and Tatyana Ali in 2004. After the release of his studio albums on Hollywood Records, he left and joined 845 Entertainment/SMC Recordings, releasing his third album Back Like I Left Somethin' in 2006.

McDaniel signed with London-based record label Transmission Records in 2009 and released his digital single 'London Girl' on May 16, 2010. In 2012, McDaniel starred in In the Hive to much acclaim. The film was shot in only 18 days. In 2013, he joined the cast of BET's new series Hit the Floor.

In 2017, McDaniel reprised his role as Devon Carter on the revamp of Disney Channel's That's So Raven, titled Raven's Home. He appears as the ex-husband of Raven-Symoné's character Raven Baxter, with whom Devon shares twins Nia and Booker.

== Personal life ==
McDaniel has a daughter, Aiza Jae McDaniel, born on August 21, 2013.

On July 30, 2017, McDaniel's son, Asher Levi, was born.

== Filmography ==
=== Film ===
Year	Title	Role	Notes
2004	Ring of Darkness	Coordinator	
2004	Nora's Hair Salon	Leronne	Video
2006	Da Jammies	Mike Fresh	Short film
2007	South of Pico	Fernando	
2010	Kill Katie Malone	Dixie	
2010	Burning Palms	Trey	
2010	Detention	T-Loc	
2012	In the Hive	Xtra Keys	
2016	My Many Sons	Pete Froedden	
2015	Call Me King	Zho	

=== Television ===
Year	Title	Role	Notes
2003–06	That's So Raven	Devon Carter	Recurring role; 10 episodes
2007	Johnny Kapahala: Back on Board	Sam Sterling	Television film
2009	Cougar Town	Ryan	Episode: "Pilot"
2013–2018	Hit the Floor	German Vega	Series regular
2015	Real Husbands of Hollywood	Chad	Episode: "Broad Talk"
2017–2021	Raven's Home	Devon Carter	Recurring role; 11 episodes
2019	Michael Caine	Brad Pryce	Episode: "Disloyalty" and "Informant"

=== Web ===
Year	Title	Role	Notes
2011	Aim High	Derek Long	6 episodes

== Discography ==
=== Albums ===
Year	Title
2002	All About J
2003	Back 2 J
2006	Back Like I Left Somethin'

=== Singles ===
Year	Title
2001	"It's The Weekend"
2002	"Baby Girl"
2006	"I Know (When We First Met)"
2010	"'London Girl"
2013	"Birthday Feat. Fletcher & iE-Z"
