= In the Hive =

- Directed by: Robert Townsend
- Written by: Cheryl L. West
- Produced by: Messiah Jacobs; Bobby McGee; Lydia Nicole; Rey Ramsey; David Saunier; Robert Townsend
- Starring: Michael Clarke Duncan; Vivica A. Fox; Jonathan McDaniel
- Cinematography: John L. Demps Jr.
- Edited by: Robert Pergament
- Music by: Dontae Winslow
- Production company: V Studio
- Distributed by: Entertainment One
- Release date: December 14, 2012
- Running time: 111 minutes
- Country: United States
- Language: English

In the Hive is a 2012 drama film starring Michael Clarke Duncan (in his first posthumous release following his death earlier that year), Vivica A. Fox, and Jonathan McDaniel. It was directed by Robert Townsend and released in the USA on December 14, 2012.

== Cast ==
- Jonathan McDaniel as "Xtra Keys"
- Loretta Devine as Mrs. Inez
- Michael Clarke Duncan as Mr. Hollis
- Vivica A. Fox as Billie

== Accolades ==
Loretta Devine was nominated for the award for Best Actress in a Motion Picture at the 2013 NAACP Image Awards for her role in In the Hive.
