= Hollywood Shuffle =

1987 film by Robert Townsend

- Theatrical release poster
- Directed by: Robert Townsend
- Written by: Keenen Ivory Wayans; Robert Townsend; Dom Irrera (uncredited)
- Produced by: Robert Townsend; Lydia Nicole
- Starring: The Hollywood Shuffle Players
- Cinematography: Peter Deming
- Edited by: W.O. Garrett
- Music by: Udi Harpaz
- Distributed by: The Samuel Goldwyn Company
- Release date: March 20, 1987
- Running time: 78 minutes
- Country: United States
- Language: English
- Budget: $100,000 (estimated)
- Box office: $5.2 million

Hollywood Shuffle is a 1987 American satirical comedy film about the racial stereotypes of African Americans in film and television. The film tracks the attempts of Bobby Taylor to become a successful actor and the mental and external roadblocks he encounters, represented through a series of interspersed vignettes and fantasies. Produced, directed, and co-written by Robert Townsend, the film is semi-autobiographical, reflecting Townsend's experiences as a black actor when he was told he was not "black enough" for certain roles.

== Plot ==
Bobby Taylor is a young black man aspiring to become an actor. His younger brother Stevie watches him prepare to audition for a part in Jivetime Jimmy's Revenge, a movie about street gangs which is so full of stereotypes that the light-skinned black actors who audition are cast as Latino gang members and have to speak with cartoonish Spanish accents. Bobby's grandmother overhears the "jive talk" of Bobby's lines and expresses disapproval. His mother is more supportive, but Bobby's grandmother says that if he desires a respectable job, there is honest work at the post office. Bobby assures his mother that if he lands the part, their lives will change for the better.

After the audition, Mr. Jones questions Bobby's dedication to his job at Jones's restaurant, Winky Dinky Dog, because Bobby frequently misses work so he can attend auditions and casting calls. A limousine arrives, and its passenger is B. B. Sanders, a famous actor who plays a stereotypical black comedy character, Batty Boy, in the popular television sitcom There's a Bat in My House. Ecstatic to meet a potential role model, Bobby asks Sanders how to determine if a role is worth taking. Sanders says if Bobby's character does not die, then "it's a good script." He tells Bobby that acting is not about art, but making money through sequels, merchandising, etc.

Bobby's agent calls to say his audition went well, and he got a callback, but the producers want an "Eddie Murphy-type". That night, he has a nightmare in which the director, writer, and casting director hound him to become Eddie Murphy. Waiting in line with a group of Eddie Murphy clones, Bobby also starts turning into Eddie Murphy, then wakes up in shock.

The next day, Bobby's restaurant co-workers, Donald and Tiny, tell him he will never succeed as an actor, so Bobby quits. That night, he visits his uncle Ray, a singer who gave up a chance at stardom to take a "real" job and provide for his family. Bobby expresses doubts about pursuing acting, but Ray encourages Bobby to follow his dreams. During his callback, the director, writer, and casting director are thrilled at Bobby's performance, and he wins the lead role.

After getting the part, Bobby begins to experience attacks of conscience that manifest as daydreams based on what people around him are saying or doing, including one ("Black Acting School") where white coaches teach black performers how to act "more black", and one where two young black men gain entry to a theater without paying and review films that spoof popular titles à la At the Movies, including Amadeus Meets Salieri, Chicago Jones and the Temple of Doom, Dirty Larry, and Attack of the Street Pimps.

At home, Bobby is celebrating with his girlfriend Lydia when his grandmother arrives. The three of them watch a film noir, which causes Bobby to fantasize about playing the lead in his own film noir, Death of a Breakdancer. That night, Bobby dreams of the roles that he wants to play, from a Shakespearean king, to a black superhero, to a black version of Rambo ("Rambro"). His final dream depicts him winning his fifth Oscar. The next day, Bobby starts filming Jivetime Jimmy's Revenge with his family in attendance. His guilt about playing a stereotypical character finally overwhelms him, and Bobby quits. Another cast member who previously complained about the stereotypical film hypocritically takes over Bobby's part, but Bobby and his family leave the set with their pride intact.

In the closing scene, Bobby is completing preparations on a different set for an on-camera scene that is about to begin. In an echo of his grandmother's earlier admonition, Hollywood Shuffle ends with Bobby filming a TV PSA for the US Postal Service.

== Cast ==
- Robert Townsend as Bobby Taylor, an aspiring young black actor who dreams of making it big in Hollywood. Townsend was also the producer, director, and co-writer of the film. Among the characters Townsend appears as in his daydreaming vignettes are Jasper, the butler in "Black Acting School"; Speed, the film critic in "Sneakin' in the Movies"; Sam Ace, the private investigator in Death of a Breakdancer; and Rambro, the black Rambo-like war hero in Bobby's dream about winning an Oscar.
- Anne-Marie Johnson as Lydia, Bobby's girlfriend who remains supportive even as he begins to question his career choice. She also appears in the "Black Acting School" segment as runaway slave Willie Mae and as a hooker in the "Sneakin' in the Movies" clip of Attack of the Street Pimps.
- Craigus R. Johnson as Stevie Taylor, Bobby Taylor's younger brother who admires Bobby and his career as an actor.
- Helen Martin as Bobby's Grandmother. She disapproves of Bobby's willingness to depict degrading black stereotypes.
- Starletta DuPois as Bobby's Mother. She is supportive of Bobby even though she agrees with Bobby's grandmother that degrading roles serve as poor examples for black youth.
- David McKnight as Uncle Ray. A former singer, he now works at a barbershop. Bobby comes to Ray with his doubts about his acting career. Ray serves as a guiding light, telling Bobby to follow his dreams.
- Keenen Ivory Wayans as Donald, Bobby's co-worker at Winky Dinky Dog. He discourages Bobby from acting and thinks that Bobby will not make it in Hollywood. Wayans also plays Jheri Curl in Death of a Breakdancer.
- Lou B. Washington as Tiny, another one of Bobby's co-workers who discourages him from acting.
- Brad Sanders as B. B. Sanders/Batty Boy, the wealthy and cynical star of the television sitcom, There's a Bat in My House.
- John Witherspoon as Mr. Jones, Bobby's boss at Winky Dinky Dog. Tries his best to keep Bobby a steady employee but becomes exasperated by Bobby's constant need to attend auditions.
- Eugene Robert Glazer as Director, the director of Jivetime Jimmy's Revenge. He also appears in the "Black Acting School" segment as an instructor, as Amadeus in Amadeus Meets Salieri, as Chicago Jones in Chicago Jones and the Temple of Doom, and as Larry in Dirty Larry.
- Lisa Mende as Casting Director, the casting director of Jivetime Jimmy's Revenge who constantly demands "more black" from the actors.
- Dom Irrera as Writer, the writer of Jivetime Jimmy's Revenge who admits in a rap song at the end of the film that everything he knows about African Americans he learned from movies and television.
- The Hollywood Shuffle Players as various cast members. As Bobby dreams and daydreams, several actors appear in the vignettes multiple times, including Conni Marie Brazelton, Sena Ayn Black, Jesse Aragon, Verda Bridges, Grand L. Bush, and Damon Wayans.

== Production ==
Townsend financed the film himself using his own savings and multiple pre-approved credit card applications, raising an estimated $60,000 to $100,000. The film was shot over two and a half years, with twelve days of filming. Townsend would rent camera equipment on Thursday, say they were shooting on Friday, and return the equipment on Monday, getting three days shooting for the cost of one. The Los Angeles Times said the movie cost "less than $1 million" and later said it cost $400,000.

== Reception ==
=== Critical response ===
The film received generally positive reviews. On review aggregator Rotten Tomatoes, 88% of 32 reviews were positive, with a rating average of 6.5 out of 10. The site’s critical consensus reads, “Hollywood Shuffle overcomes budgetary constraints with sharp humor and infectious energy, heralding the arrival of an exciting new filmmaking talent in the bargain.” On Metacritic, the film has a weighted average score of 74% based on reviews from 14 critics, indicating "generally favorable" reviews.

Roger Ebert of the Chicago Sun-Times called the film "an artistic compromise but a logistical triumph, announcing the arrival of a new talent whose next movie should really be something." Richard Harrington of The Washington Post called Hollywood Shuffle "a funny, poignant and technically proficient film."

The film has been criticized for its use of stereotypes of women and homosexuals. Jami Bernard of the New York Post claims that Townsend is "passing the buck", addressing the misrepresentation of black Americans, but maintaining stereotypes of other groups of people, such as the image of the stereotypical homosexual hairdresser. Harriet Margolis claims that "Townsend ignores gender issues, thereby weakening certain aspects of his own attack on Hollywood's misuse of stereotypes." In 2023, Townsend said: "I never want to hurt anybody or anything [...] we were just being comedians going for any joke that was on the table" but with hindsight there were certain jokes that he would not do now.

=== Accolades ===
1987 Deauville Film Festival

- Grand Special Prize (Critics Award) — Robert Townsend (winner)

1988 Independent Spirit Awards

- Best First Feature — Carl Craig, Robert Townsend (Nominated)

== Home media ==
A restored 4K Blu-ray edition of Hollywood Shuffle with new audio commentary from Townsend was released by The Criterion Collection on February 28, 2023.

== See also ==
- I'm Gonna Git You Sucka (1988)
