= Famous Amos =

Cookie company founded by Wally Amos

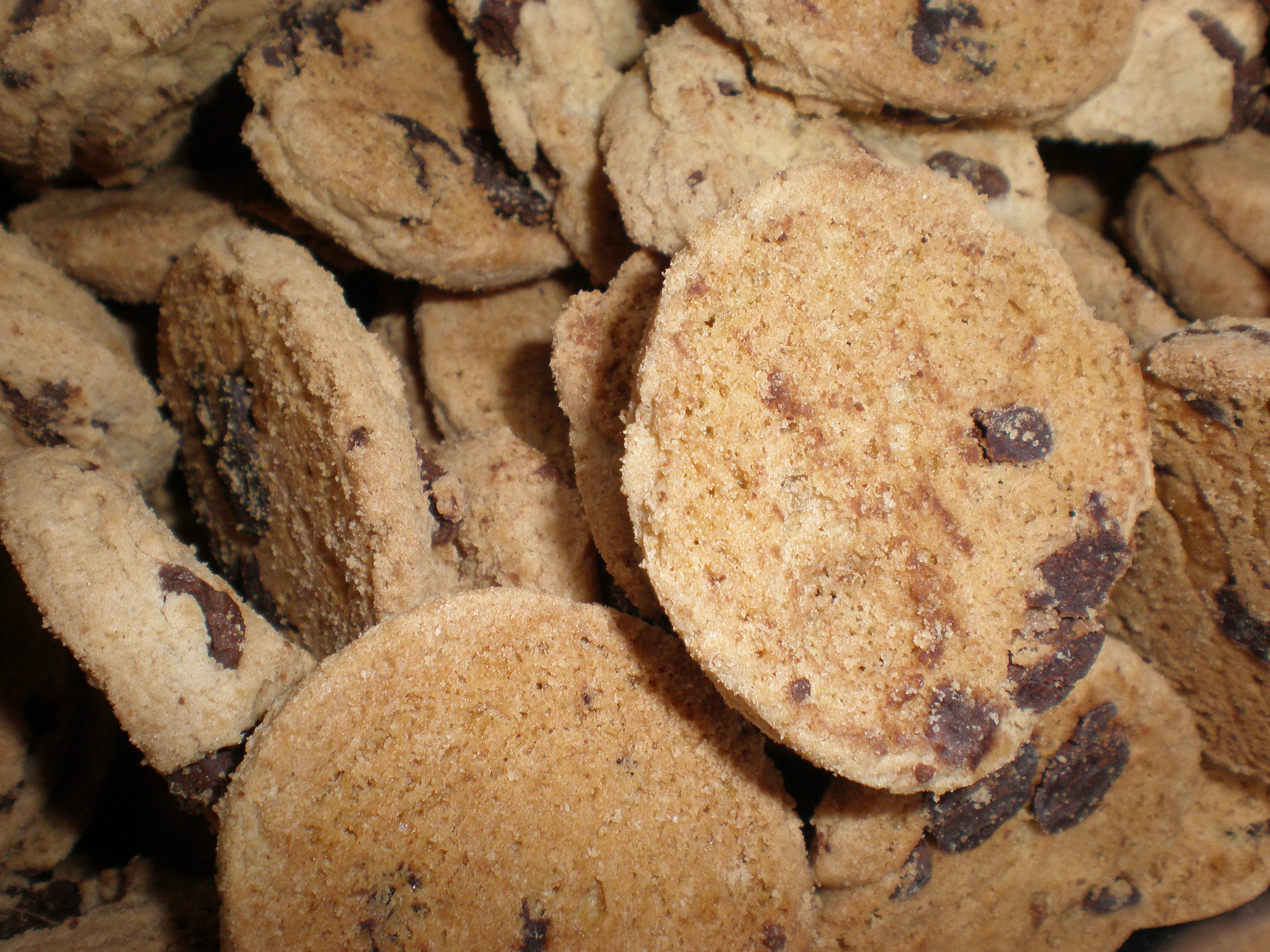
- Product type: Cookie
- Current owner: Ferrero SpA
- Introduced: 1975; 51 years ago
- Markets: Worldwide
- Previous owners: Kellogg Company
- Website: famousamos.com

Famous Amos is a brand of cookies founded in Los Angeles in 1975 by Wally Amos.

== History ==
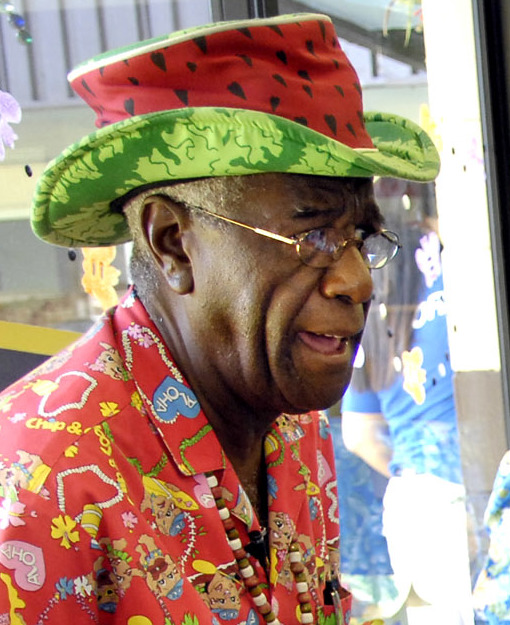
Wally Amos, founder

Wallace "Wally" Amos was born in Tallahassee, Florida, United States, on July 1, 1936. In 1948, he moved to New York City to live with his aunt where they often baked cookies together. As an adult, Amos, an Air Force veteran who worked as a talent agent with the William Morris Agency, would send his home-baked chocolate chip cookies to celebrities to entice them to meet and perhaps sign a deal with his agency.

On March 10, 1975, Amos took the advice of friends, and with $25,000 from singers Marvin Gaye and Helen Reddy, he opened a cookie store at 7181 Sunset Boulevard in the Hollywood neighborhood of Los Angeles, California, naming it "Famous Amos". In the first year he sold $300,000 worth of cookies, followed by more than $1,000,000 in sales in the store's second year of operation. By 1982, the company's revenues reached $12 million. The store proved so popular that the "Famous Amos" brand eventually branched out to sell cookies in supermarkets, a move that would later be emulated by other specialty stores such as Baskin-Robbins, TGI Fridays, and Starbucks.

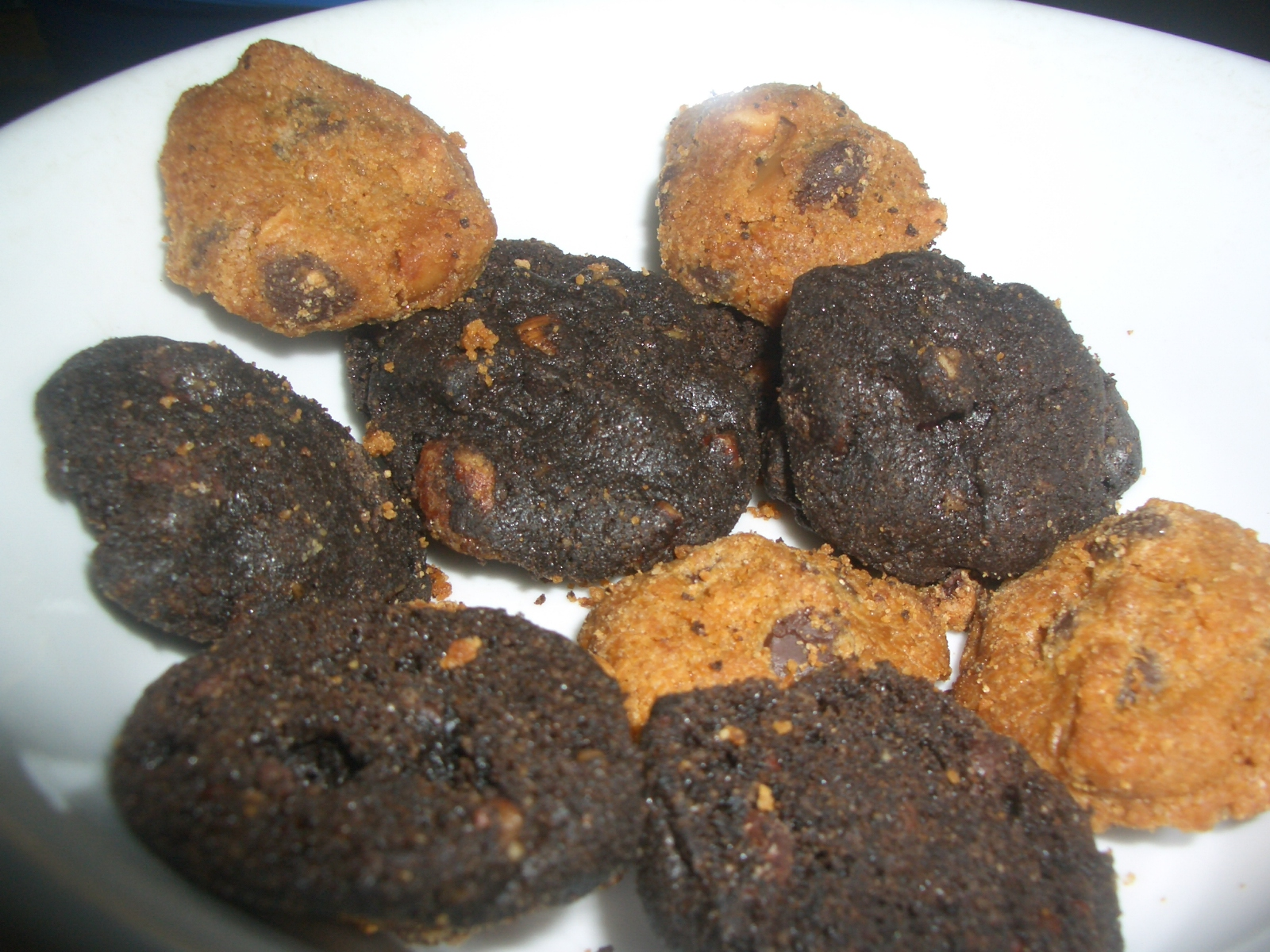
Close-up of assorted Famous Amos cookies

However, by 1984, sales had started to slow and Amos began to sell parts of the business. In March 1985, Amos sold 51% interest to Bass Brothers Enterprises in an attempt to salvage the business. That year, the company had lost $300,000 as revenues fell to $10 million. Investors got involved to try to stop the downward spiral, but according to Amos, they took more of an equity stake each time and did not stay long enough to get the company back on track. By August 1985, Bass Brothers had sold a majority share to an investor group, who planned a major expansion. By 1988, the company had lost $2.5 million. That year, the Shansby Group purchased Famous Amos for $3 million. After one year as a paid spokesman for the company, Amos quit in frustration.

The Famous Amos brand has gone through a number of owners since inception. Between 1988 and 2001, the Famous Amos company went through more than five different owners. In 1992, the President Baking Company purchased the brand from the Shansby Group. In 1998, Keebler purchased the President Baking Company. It was owned by Keebler until the Kellogg Company purchased Keebler in 2001.

In July 2019, the Kellogg company completed the sale of Keebler cookies (including Famous Amos) to Ferrero SpA. The Keebler brand is manufactured by the Ferrero Groups US subsidiary Ferrara. In 2025, Nutella maker Ferrero purchased Kellogg, along with the Famous Amos brand.

Wally Amos died on August 13, 2024, due to complications from dementia at his home in Honolulu, Hawaii.

There is a sign commemorating the first Famous Amos store in Los Angeles, located at West Sunset Boulevard and North Formosa Avenue in Hollywood.

Wally Amos created another brand of cookie called "Chip and Cookie", named after two characters he created in the 1980s. The Chip and Cookie brand was owned by Amos, and has a slightly different recipe than the one used by Kellogg's.

== Packages ==
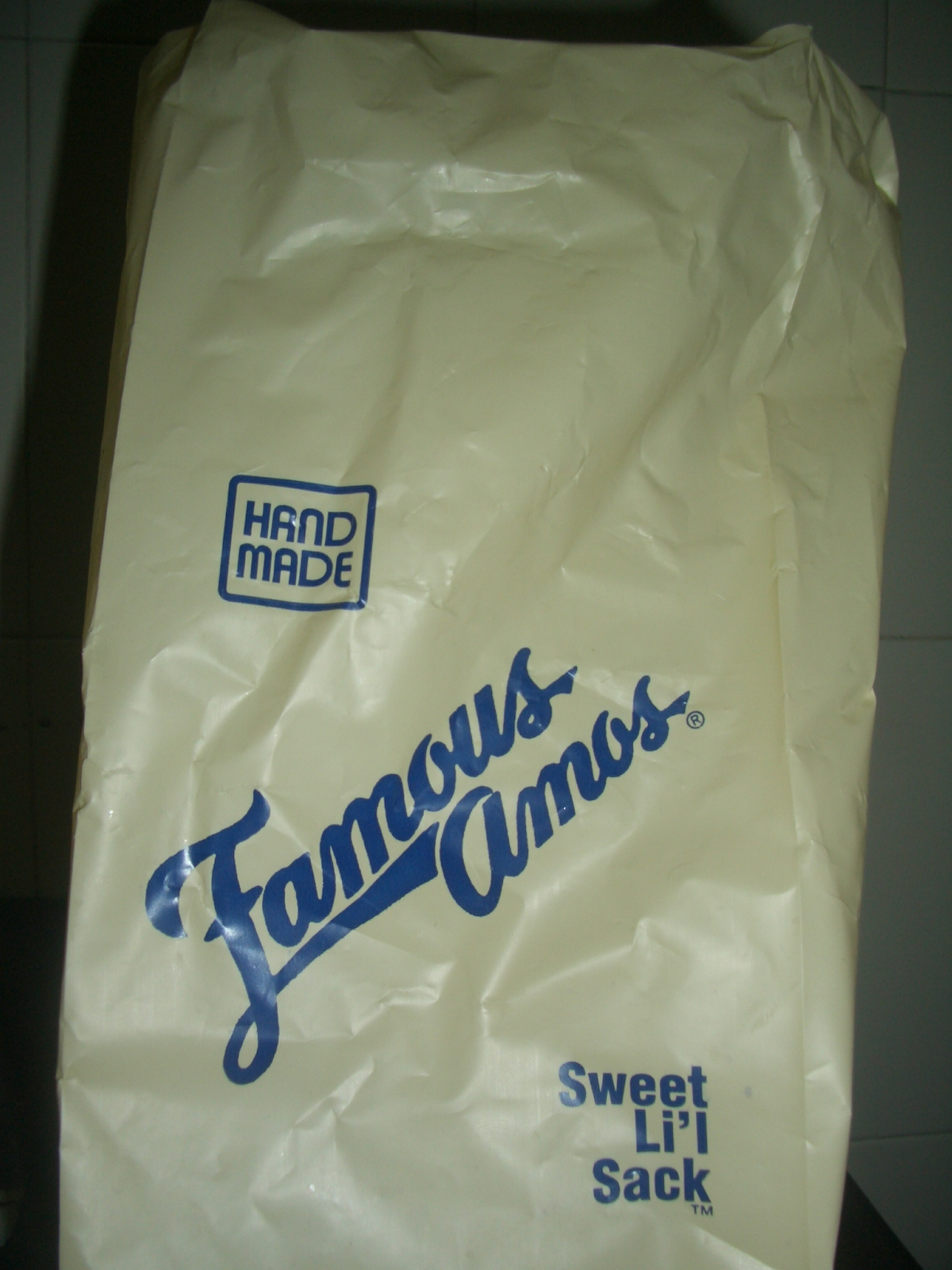
Package from a Singapore outlet, c. 2007

The Famous Amos cookie brand has gone through four package designs. The original package consisted of a round, tin metal box, similar to the blue packages of a European brand of cookies, except that Famous Amos's package was white, and with a photo of what seemed to be a large chocolate chip cookie spinning on Wally Amos's finger. Amos himself was pictured on these packages, wearing his trademark straw hat and cotton shirt.

The 1980s packages consisted of small plastic bags that resembled the larger bags of the same material used by supermarkets during that period. They had the brand's name inscribed in small letters, and once again, with a photo of Amos apparently spinning a large chocolate chip cookie on his finger, in a way that was similar to the basketball-spinning trick made famous by the Harlem Globetrotters.

The 1990s packages were much larger than those of the 1980s, with the name "Famous Amos" prominently displayed on the cover. These packages marked the end of Wally Amos's cover appearances, and featured a number of small cookies pictured instead, with a blue ribbon reading "chocolate chip".

The 2000s Famous Amos packages are very similar to the ones used during the 1990s, except for a couple of differences, such as the ribbon's color (almond has replaced blue). Part of Wally Amos's biography is featured on the back of the newest packages.

The design of the 2000s Famous Amos package does not include the biography on the back of the Not for Resale editions, or packages that come in large boxes or packs, usually found at Sam's Club and Costco.

International franchise owners in franchise locations overseas sometimes design their own cookie bags printed with 3D ribbons.

== Bibliography ==
- Man With No Name: Turn Lemons into Lemonade, Aslan, ISBN 978-0944031575
- The Famous Amos Story: The Face That Launched a Thousand Chips, Bantam Doubleday, ISBN 0385193785
- Making Mistakes is Natural: Chicken Soup for the African American Soul. Health Communications, Inc. ISBN 978-0757301421
