= Barry Diamond =

American comedian

- Born: November 14, 1951 (age 74); Bronx, New York, U.S.

Barry Diamond (born November 14, 1951) is an American comedian who released one album, Fighter Pilot, on IRS Records in 1983. He has made several appearances on film and television, acting on episodes of Diff'rent Strokes, Seinfeld, Friends, Curb Your Enthusiasm, as well as in the 1984 film Bachelor Party.

As a stand-up comedian he was a regular on ABC's The 1/2 Hour Comedy Hour.

== Fighter Pilot ==
Fighter Pilot was released on IRS Records in June 1983 after Diamond was discovered by IRS's Miles Copeland III. It was released on vinyl LP (SP-70035) and cassette tape only, and has never been released on CD.

=== Track listing ===
1. What Pisses Me Off
2. How I Got Started In Showbiz
3. The South Bronx
4. Gay Whale Hunting In Hawaii
5. Live And Let Live
6. Killed My Girlfriend
7. Everything Except The...
8. Nuclear Missile Silo Repairman
9. Tribute To The Boss
10. Health, Money, Herpes
11. College In Peru
12. Fighter Pilot
13. My House After The Show
