= Marilyn Martinez =

American actress

- Born: February 9, 1955
- Died: November 3, 2007 (aged 52); Los Angeles
- Spouse: John David Crowder

Comedy career
- Years active: 1977–2007
- Medium: Stand-up comedy
- Website: http://www.marilynmartinez.com

Marilyn Martinez (February 9, 1955 – November 3, 2007) was an American stand up comedian and actress. She was a regular performer at The Comedy Store in Hollywood.

Martinez was of Mexican descent. She appeared in numerous television comedy specials including 1st Amendment Stand Up; Hot Tamales Live: Spicy, Hot and Hilarious; and The Latin Divas of Comedy. Her acting credits included My Wife and Kids and the film Pauly Shore Is Dead.

According to her website, Martinez died on Saturday, November 3, 2007 at 10:16 a.m. She had been diagnosed with colon cancer almost nine months before.
