= Robert Townsend (actor) =

American actor and director (born 1957)

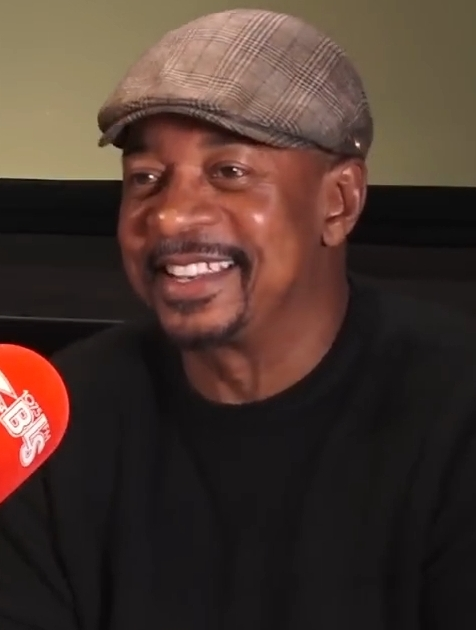
- Townsend in 2018
- Born: February 6, 1957 (age 69); Chicago, Illinois, U.S.
- Education: Austin High School; Illinois State University
- Occupations: Actor; comedian; film director; writer
- Years active: 1974–present
- Notable work: Hollywood Shuffle; The Five Heartbeats; The Meteor Man; The Parent 'Hood
- Spouse: Cheri Jones (m. 1990; div. 2001)
- Children: 3, including Skye
- Website: roberttownsend.com

Robert Townsend (born February 6, 1957) is an American actor, director, comedian, and writer. During the 1980s and early-1990s, Townsend gained national exposure through his stand-up comedy routines and appearances on The Tonight Show Starring Johnny Carson.

Townsend is best known for directing and starring in the feature films Hollywood Shuffle (1987) and The Five Heartbeats (1991). He is well recognized for his leading role Robert Peterson in The WB's sitcom The Parent 'Hood, the series he created and directed select episodes of ran from 1995 to 1999.

== Early life, family and education ==
Townsend was born in Chicago, Illinois, the second of four children to Shirley (née Jenkins), who was of Puerto Rican descent, and Robert Townsend. His mother raised the children as a single parent on the city's west side. Townsend attended Austin High School, graduating in 1975. He became interested in acting as a teenager. During a reading of Sophocles' Oedipus Rex in high school, Townsend captured the attention of Chicago's X-Bag Theatre, The Experimental Black Actors Guild. He performed and studied at the Second City comedy workshop for improvisation in 1974.

After high school, Townsend studied for a year at Illinois State University. Although Townsend's mother believed that he should complete his college education, he felt that college took time away from his passion for acting, so he left school to pursue his acting career full-time. He relocated to New York City to study at the Negro Ensemble Company.

== Career ==
As a teenager, Townsend auditioned for parts at Chicago's Experimental Black Actors' Guild and performed in local plays. Townsend had a brief uncredited role in the 1975 movie Cooley High. He has stated that the film "changed his life" for what he perceived as its true-to-life portrayal of people like him.

Townsend auditioned to be part of Saturday Night Live's 1980–1981 cast, but he lost the slot to Eddie Murphy. In 1982, Townsend appeared as one of the main characters in the PBS series Another Page, produced by Kentucky Educational Television that taught literacy to adults through serialized stories. Townsend later appeared in small parts in films like A Soldier's Story (1984), directed by Norman Jewison, and after its success garnered much more substantial parts in films like The Mighty Quinn (1989) with Denzel Washington. In 1985, Townsend appeared in a significant supporting role in the cycling drama American Flyers, starring alongside Kevin Costner and Rae Dawn Chong. He portrayed Jerome, a close friend and teammate to the lead characters.

In 1987, Townsend wrote, directed and produced Hollywood Shuffle, a satire based on the hardships and obstacles that African-American actors undergo in the film industry. The success of his first project helped him establish himself in the industry. He directed the very popular stand-up comedy performance Eddie Murphy Raw (1987) which was released in theaters. Another of his films, The Five Heartbeats, was based on 1960s R&B male groups and the tribulations of the music industry. (He later wrote, directed and produced Making the Five Heartbeats (2018), a documentary film about the production and behind-the-scenes insight into creating the film.) Townsend's production company Townsend Entertainment has produced films Playin' for Love, In the Hive and more.

Townsend created and produced two television variety shows—the CableACE award–winning Robert Townsend and His Partners in Crime for HBO, and the Fox Television variety show Townsend Television (1993). He also created and starred in the WB Network's sitcom The Parent 'Hood which originally ran from January 1995 to July 1999. In 2018, Townsend also directed two episodes for the BET Series American Soul which began airing in 2019. The show is about Don Cornelius and Soul Train. Townsend was programming director for the Black Family Channel, but the network folded in 2007. Townsend created The Robert Townsend Foundation, a nonprofit organization whose mission is to introduce and help new unsigned filmmakers. Townsend directed the 2001 TV movie, Livin' for Love: The Natalie Cole Story, for which Cole won the NAACP Image Award as Outstanding Actress in a Television Movie, Mini-Series or Dramatic Special. Townsend also directed two television movies in 2001 and 2002 respectively, Carmen: A Hip Hopera and 10,000 Black Men Named George.

== Awards and other credits ==
In 2013, Townsend was nominated for an Ovation Award in the category of "Lead Actor in a Musical" for his role as Dan in the La Mirada Theatre for the Performing Arts production of Next to Normal. Townsend won Indie Soap Awards in 2010 and 2011 as executive producer of the webseries Diary of a Single Mom, which was named Indie Soap of the Year two consecutive years.

== Personal life ==
Townsend was married to Cheri Jones from September 15, 1990, to August 9, 2001. They have three children, including singer/actress Skye Townsend.

== Filmography ==
=== Film ===
Year	Title	Director	Producer	Writer
1987	Hollywood Shuffle	Yes	Yes	Yes
1987	Eddie Murphy Raw	Yes	No	No
1991	The Five Heartbeats	Yes	Yes	Yes
1993	The Meteor Man	Yes	Yes	Yes
1997	B*A*P*S	Yes	No	No
2008	Of Boys and Men	No	Yes	No
2009	Phantom Punch	Yes	No	No
2012	In the Hive	Yes	Yes	No
2015	Playin' for Love	Yes	Yes	Yes

Direct-to-video

- Black Listed (2003) (Also writer)
- Bill Cosby 77 (2014) (Unreleased)

Acting roles

Year	Title	Role	Notes
1975	Cooley High	Basketball player seen in the gym room	Uncredited
1975	Mahogany	Extra	Uncredited
1976	The Monkey Hustle	Musician	
1979	The Warriors	Baseball Fury	Uncredited
1980	Willie & Phil	Thin Boy	
1984	Streets of Fire	Lester - The Sorels	
1984	A Soldier's Story	Cpl. Ellis	
1985	American Flyers	Jerome	
1986	Ratboy	Manny	
1986	Odd Jobs	Dwight	
1987	Hollywood Shuffle	Bobby Taylor	
1989	The Mighty Quinn	Maubee	
1991	The Five Heartbeats	Donald "Duck" Matthews	
1993	The Meteor Man	Jefferson Reed/Meteor Man	
1999	Joseph's Gift	James Saunders	
2000	Up, Up and Away	Jim Marshall/Bronze Eagle	
2003	Black Listed	Alan Chambers	Direct-to-video
2008	Of Boys and Men	Holden Cole	
2012	Scooby-Doo! Music of the Vampire	Vampire Actor #1	Voice role
2015	Playin' for Love	Coach Banks	

=== Television ===
Year	Title	Director	Writer	Executive Producer	Creator	Notes
1981	Another Page	No	No	No	No	15 episodes
1987	The Late Show	No	Yes	No	No	1 episode
1993	Townsend Television	Yes	Yes	Yes	Yes	10 episodes
1995–1999	The Parent 'Hood	Yes	Yes	Yes	Yes	Directed 17 episodes
2002	Soul Food	Yes	No	No	No	Episode: "Tonight at Noon"
2005–2006	South of Nowhere	Yes	No	No	No	4 episodes
2007	Unfabulous	Yes	No	No	No	Episode: "The Quest"
2009	Diary of a Single Mom	Yes	No	Yes	No	All 26 episodes
2018	Love Is	Yes	No	No	No	Episode: "First Date"
2019	American Soul	Yes	No	No	No	Episodes: "Lost and Found" and Just Us
2019	Black Lightning	Yes	No	No	No	Episodes: "Pillar of Fire" and "Requiem for Tavon"
2020	The Last O.G.	Yes	No	No	No	Episodes: "Family Feud" and "Come Clean"
2021	The Wonder Years	Yes	No	No	No	Episode: "Independence Day"
2023–2026	Power Book IV: Force	Yes	No	No	No	Episodes: "Here There Be Monsters", "The Last Dance" and "The Beginning of the End"
2024–2025	Poppa's House	Yes	No	No	No	5 episodes

TV special

Year	Title	Director	Writer	Executive Producer	Notes
1987	Uptown Comedy Express	No	Yes	No	
1991	The Best of Robert Townsend and His Partners in Crime	Yes	Yes	Yes	
1991	A Party for Richard Pryor	No	Yes	No	
1991	A Comedy Salute to Michael Jordan	No	Yes	No	Event from Comic Relief USA
1992	Comic Relief V	No	Yes	No	Event from Comic Relief USA
2013	Bill Cosby: Far from Finished	Yes	No	No	
2022	Ms. Pat: Y'all Wanna Hear Something Crazy?	Yes	No	No	

TV movies

Year	Title	Director	Writer	Executive Producer
1991	Robert Townsend and His Partners in Crime	Yes	Yes	Yes
1999	Jackie's Back	Yes	No	No
2000	Up, Up and Away	Yes	No	No
2000	Little Richard	Yes	No	No
2000	Holiday Heart	Yes	No	No
2001	Livin' for Love: The Natalie Cole Story	Yes	No	No
2001	Carmen: A Hip Hopera	Yes	No	No
2002	10,000 Black Men Named George	Yes	No	No
2009	Musical Theater of Hope	Yes	Yes	No

Miniseries

Year	Title	Episodes
2021	Colin in Black & White	"Road Trip"
2021	Colin in Black & White	"The Decision"
2022	The Best Man: The Final Chapters	"Brown Girl Dreaming"
2022	The Best Man: The Final Chapters	"An American Marriage"
2023	Kaleidoscope	"Green: 7 Years Before the Heist"
2023	Kaleidoscope	"Violet: 24 Years Before the Heist"

Acting roles

Year	Title	Role	Notes
1978	Watch Your Mouth	Prince Otoma	Episodes "The Outcast" and "The Student Prince"
1979	Women at West Point	Russell Baker	TV movie
1981	Senior Trip	Randy	TV movie
1982	In Love with an Older Woman	James	TV movie
1982	M*A*S*H	Patient	Episode "Bombshells"
1995–1999	The Parent 'Hood	Robert Peterson	90 episodes
2002	I Was a Teenage Faust	Mr. Five	TV movie
2023–2026	The Bear	Emmanuel Adamu	12 episodes

== See also ==
- New Black Cinema
