= Library of America =

Nonprofit publisher of classic American literature and name of its book series

- Parent company: Literary Classics of the United States, Inc. (d.b.a.)
- Status: Active
- Founded: 1979; 47 years ago
- Founders: Edmund Wilson (idea); Jason Epstein; Daniel Aaron; Richard Poirier; G. Thomas Tanselle
- Country of origin: United States
- Headquarters location: New York City
- Distribution: Penguin Random House Publisher Services
- Key people: Daniel Aaron; Cheryl Hurley; Max Rudin; Hanna M. Bercovitch; Geoffrey O'Brien
- Publication types: Books
- Nonfiction topics: American documents, memoirs, criticism, and journalism
- Fiction genres: Classic American literature
- Revenue: $8.78 million (2022)
- No. of employees: 22 (staff, 2023)
- Official website: www.loa.org

The Library of America (LOA) is a nonprofit publisher of classic American literature. Founded in 1979 with seed money from the National Endowment for the Humanities and the Ford Foundation, the LOA has published more than 300 volumes by authors ranging from Nathaniel Hawthorne to Saul Bellow, Frederick Douglass to Ursula K. Le Guin, including selected writing of several U.S. presidents. Anthologies and works containing historical documents, criticism, and journalism are also published. Library of America volumes seek to print authoritative versions of works; include extensive notes, chronologies, and other back matter; and are known for their distinctive physical appearance and characteristics.

== Overview and history ==
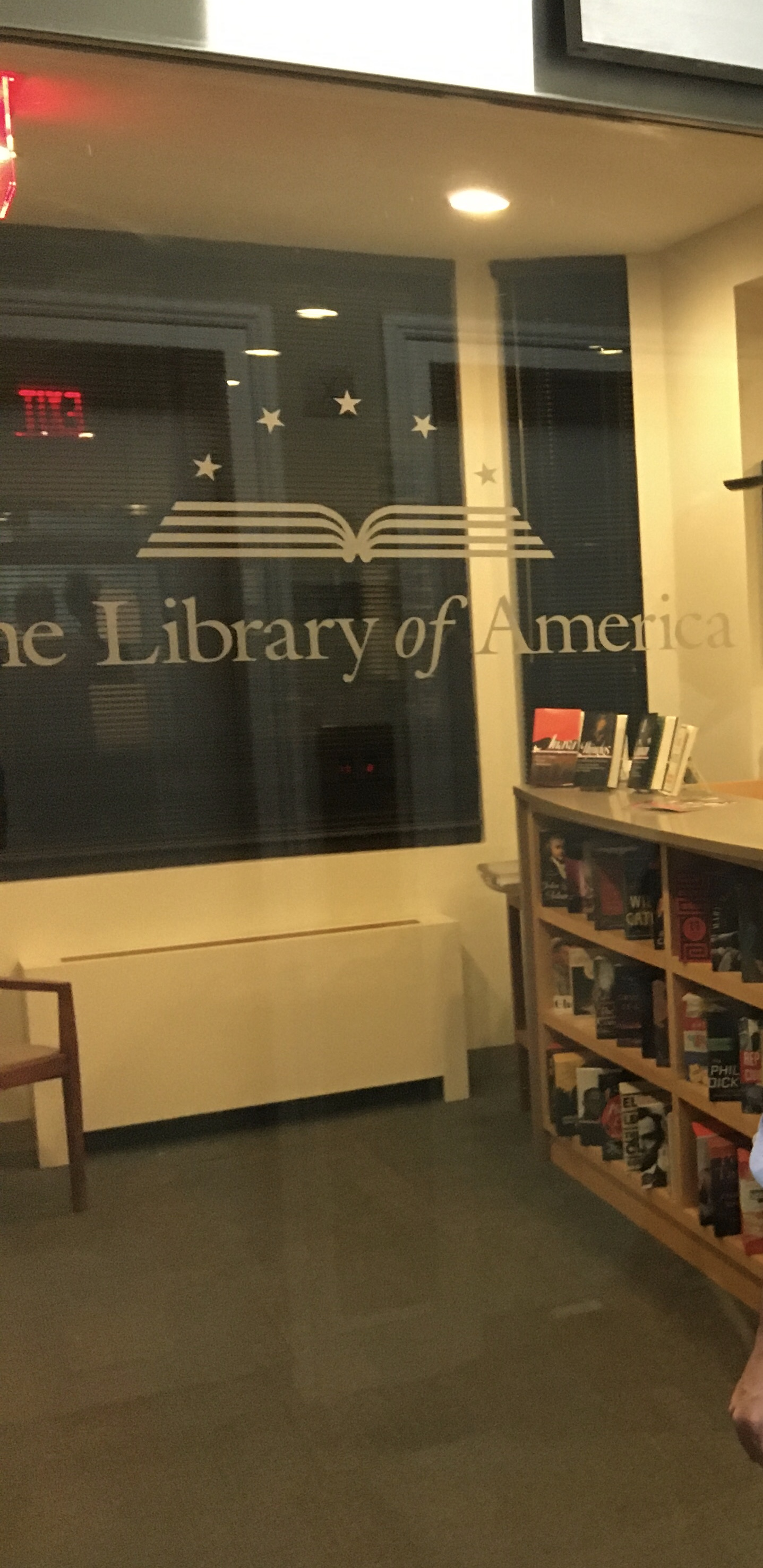
Entrance to the Library of America offices, 14 East 60th Street, New York

The Bibliothèque de la Pléiade ("La Pléiade") series published in France provided the model for the LOA, which was long a dream of critic and author Edmund Wilson. During the 1960s and 1970s, there was a long saga of rival literary outfits attempting to assemble and finding funding for much the same thing.

The founding of the Library of America took place in 1979, with the creation of an entity known as Literary Classics of the United States, Inc. (This remains the entity under which LOA notes, chronologies, and other auxiliary materials are copyrighted; and, officially, employees work for Literary Classics of the United States, Inc.) Publishers associated in some way with the creation include Lawrence Hughes, Helen Honig Meyer, and Roger W. Straus Jr. The initial board of advisers included Robert Penn Warren, C. Vann Woodward, R. W. B. Lewis, Robert Coles, Irving Howe, and Eudora Welty. Funding at the start came from two sources, the National Endowment for the Humanities and the Ford Foundation, in the total amount of $1.8 million.

The initial president of the new entity was the American academic Daniel Aaron, who had been a friend of Wilson's since the 1950s. The executive director was Cheryl Hurley, who had worked at the Modern Language Association. Other founding officers included the literary critic Richard Poirier, as vice president, and the publisher Jason Epstein, as treasurer. Epstein, and later Aaron and Poirier, had all been involved in the long series of proposals and discussions that led up to the creation of the Library of America. Another founder was the textual scholar G. Thomas Tanselle; he too had been involved in the discussions prior to creation, and after that he chaired the committee that was the arbiter of LOA textual policy.

"Its black dust jackets with an image of the author and a simple red, white, and blue stripe running below the author's name, rendered in a fountain-pen-like hand, help give the clothbound volumes a timeless feel"

— David Skinner, Humanities, 2015

Aaron remained in his position until 1985, and was responsible for navigating the shoals between the orthodoxies of literary criticism and a wider view of what the Library of America could publish. He was followed as president by executive director Hurley. In 2017, she retired as president and was replaced by Max Rudin, who was already the entity's publisher.

Hanna M. "Gila" Bercovitch served as founding editor, senior editor, and then editor-in-chief until her death in 1997. Upon her death, Henry Louis Gates said that "It is hard to find anyone who has been more central to institutionalizing the canon of American literature." She was followed as editor-in-chief by the poet and critic Geoffrey O'Brien. He retired in 2017, and was followed in 2018 by John Kulka, who was given the title of editorial director.

The first volumes were published in 1982, ten years after Wilson's death. They were priced moderately. The launch was accompanied by considerable amounts of publicity. Public response was in terms of sales positive from the beginning; by 1986, the non-profit was breaking even, although it accepted special grants for specific projects, such as one from the Bradley Foundation to enable the two-volume The Debate on the Constitution set. The response to the series continued to grow over time; between 1993 and 1996, the publisher's frontlist sales doubled. By 1996, the Library of America was getting two-thirds of its sales via subscription programs and one-third through bookstores. While for a long time the series published only the works of authors who were deceased, this changed in the late 1990s when Eudora Welty was published, soon to be followed by Philip Roth. Similarly, the rule that authors had to be American-born was later relaxed when Vladimir Nabokov was added to the list. While a nonprofit entity, the Library has not been immune to commercial considerations, often going further into genre works such as detective fiction and science fiction than some of its founders would have imagined.

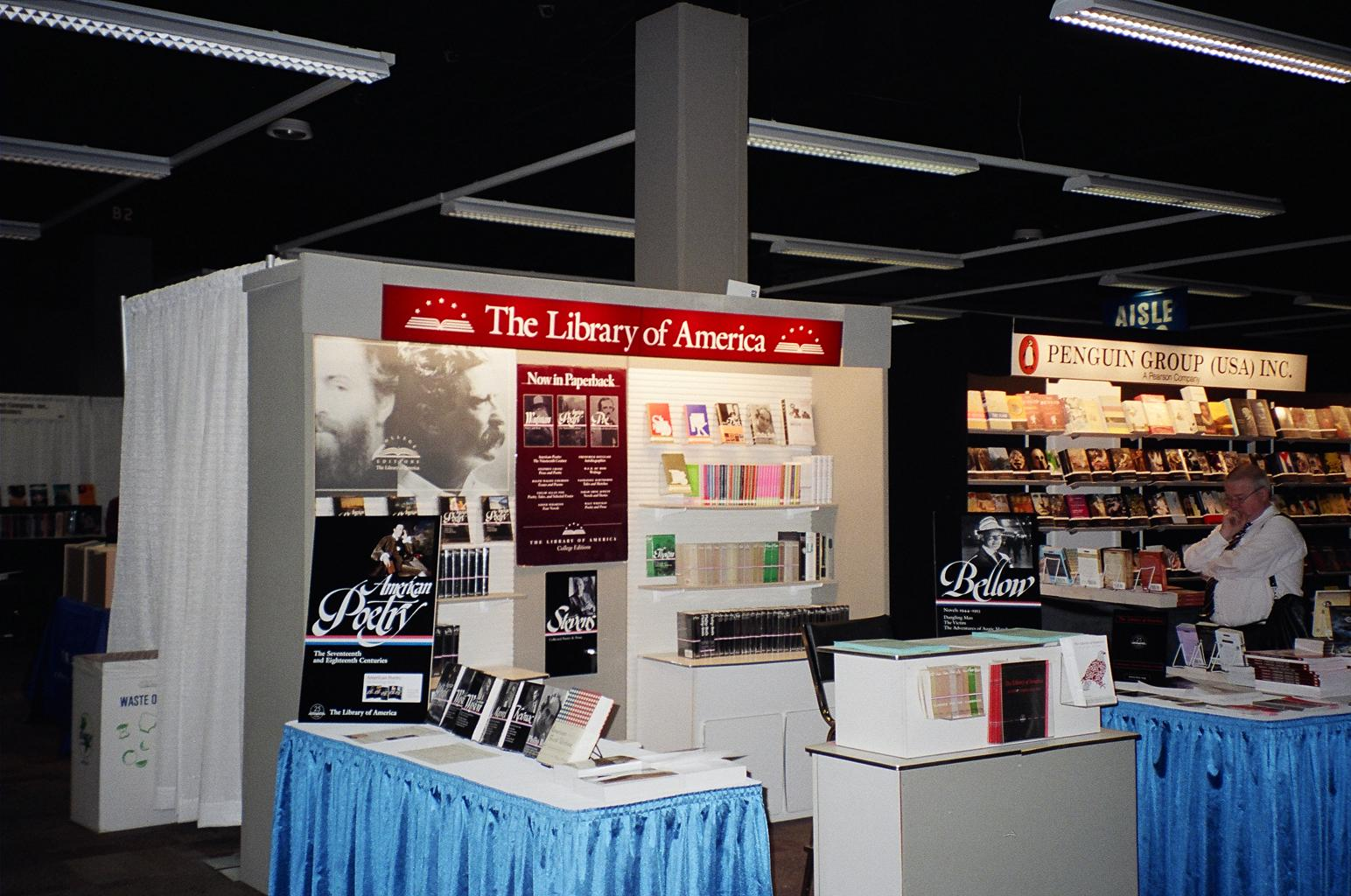
Library of America exhibit booth at MLA convention Chicago December 2007

Besides the works of many individual writers, the series includes anthologies such as (in a different format from the above illustration) Writing Los Angeles. The Library of America introduced coverage of American journalism with the 1995 two-volume set Reporting World War II, which not only garnered positive reviews, but soon became one of the publisher's five best-selling offerings to that point, the others being volumes about Abraham Lincoln, Ulysses S. Grant, William Tecumseh Sherman, and Walt Whitman. That those others all concerned the Civil War era was did not go unnoticed; one of the publisher's most ambitious later efforts, a multi-volume collection of first-person narratives, revolved around the same topic, as did such volumes as a collection of letters that Grant wrote to his wife Julia.

The publisher aims to keep classics and notable historical and genre works in print permanently to preserve America's literary and cultural heritage. Previously, often only the best-known works of an author remained in print, as exemplified by Stephen Crane, whose novels and short stories were but whose poetry and journalism were not. As LOA chief executive Cheryl Hurley stated in 2001, "We're not only a publisher, we're a cultural institution." Although the LOA sells more than a quarter-million volumes annually, with the original seed money having run out, the publisher depends on individual contributions to help meet the costs of preparing, marketing, manufacturing, and maintaining its books. In one large form of donation, as of 2001 a $50,000 contribution could sponsor a particular book being kept in print.

== Research and scholarship ==
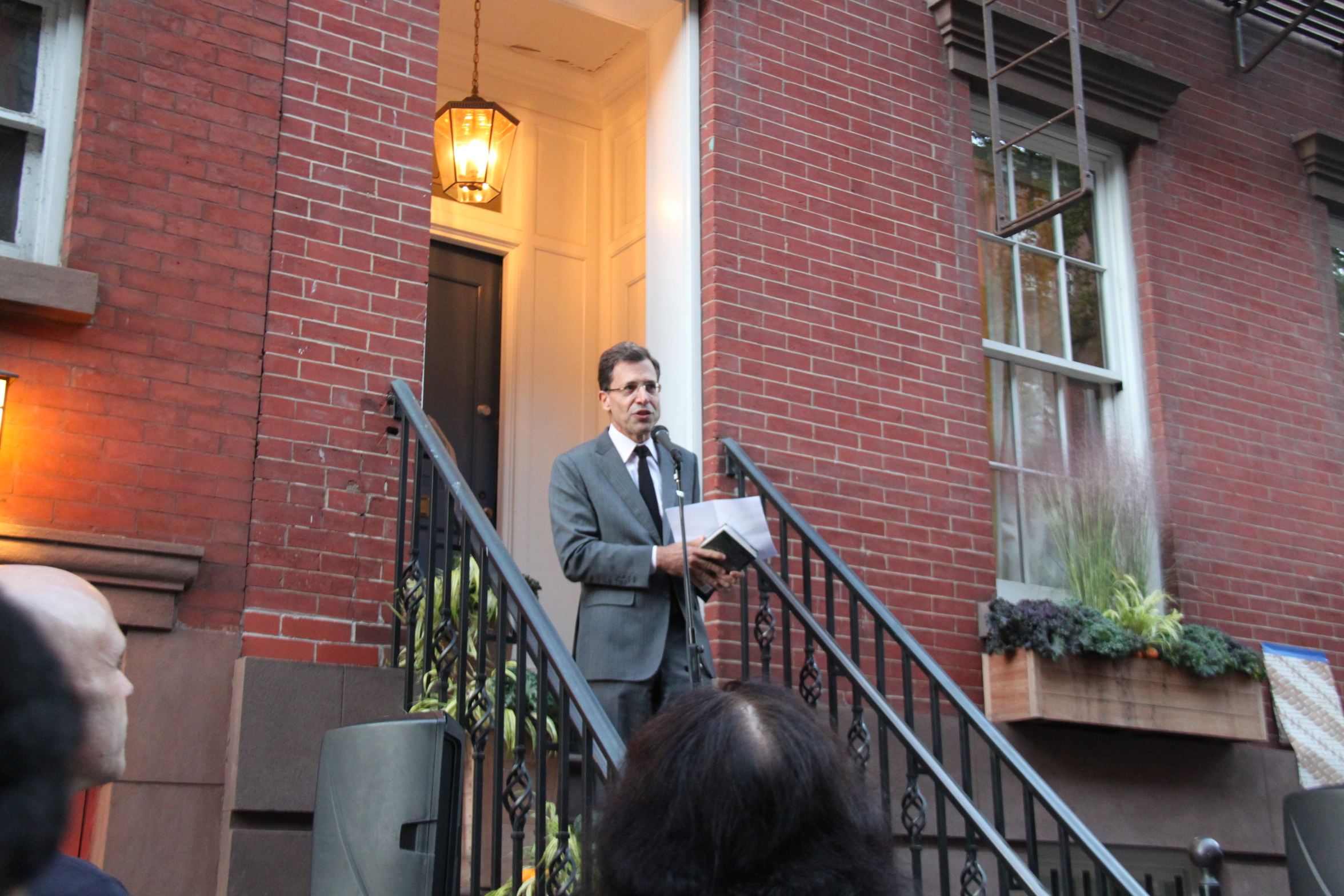
Max Rudin, publisher of the Library of America, speaking at a 2015 Greenwich Village event that unveiled a plaque at a building where author James Baldwin lived

Library of America volumes are prepared and edited by recognized scholars on the subject. Notes on the text are normally included and the source texts identified; these notes have been called "fascinating in themselves". This is part of the extensive back matter typically included with each volume, behind which large amounts of research and scholarship are conducted.

Efforts are made to correct errors and omissions in previous editions and create a definitive version of the material. For instance, under the guidance of Bercovitch, the LOA text of Richard Wright's Native Son restored a number of passages that had been previously cut to make the work more palatable to the Book-of-the-Month Club. The LOA also commissioned a new translation of Alexis de Tocqueville's Democracy in America by Arthur Goldhammer for their edition of the text. Library of America volumes of letters tend to be representative rather than exhaustive in terms of inclusion criteria.

Unlike some other series such as the Norton Critical Editions, Library of America volumes provide no introductory essays or critical examinations of the work involved. This is per Wilson's original design. At times this omission can lead to frustration based on the inability to know the basis upon which material for a volume was selected.

Each volume also includes a chronology of the author's career or significant incidents in the case of the anthology volumes. Indeed, Library of America volumes are noted for their chronologies; The New York Times has called them "predictably superb". The author and journalist Gloria Emerson's review of the Reporting World War II volumes notes that they include "an excellent chronology of the war". The poet and literary critic Stephen Yenser, in reviewing of volume about the work of the poet Elizabeth Bishop, noted that the chronology was "so packed with pertinent details it amounts to a mini-biography". The notes and chronologies are often put together by LOA staff members and in some cases have informed the perspective of the guest editors working on the volume in question. LOA staff have also sometimes helped scholars working on related projects.

== Special publications ==
Some books published as additions to the series are not kept in print in perpetuity. Special publications include thematic anthologies and sole-author works. The former collect writings about particular subjects, often related to sports, popular culture, or geographical customs, while the latter bring forward unusual items such as an unpublished novel by Richard Wright, previously unjuxtaposed essays by Hannah Arendt, or the unpublished-in-book-form testimony of the freedman Henry Adams during the post-Civil War South.

Such works often include interpretative introductions, unlike in the main series. Special publications have different designs, sizes, and bindings that depart in look and feel from the main Library of America titles. They may be cloth-covered or paperback, although as with the main series, they typically appear on acid-free paper.

== Critical reception ==
"The Library of America is well-known for its compact primary source collections with their minimalist black covers. These collections have long been a trusty resource for historians, writers, and anyone else interested in a variety of historical and literary eras, especially the American founding and early republic."

— Jeffrey J. Malanson, History: Reviews of New Books, 2017

The Library of America has received considerable praise for its endeavors. After the initial series were published, the critic Charles Champlin wrote that "The volumes in the series are in fact marvels of scholarship, unobtrusively displayed, and a prime effort has been to work from the text that reflects the author's final word." The aforementioned poet and critic Stephen Yenser has called the Library of America "invaluable"; that same term has been used to describe Library of America by the Cox News Service, by the Los Angeles Times, and by a book prize committee.

Newsweek magazine said in 2010 that "For three decades, the LOA has done a splendid job of making good on" its initial goals. Writing for the New York Times Book Review, the essayist and teacher William Deresiewicz has referred to the Library of America as "our quasi-official national canon". Indeed, whether an American writer has achieved a level of greatness is sometimes associated with whether they have the imprimatur of the Library of America. Writing for The Sewanee Review, the academic Michael Gorra has said that "the Library has shaped and indeed expanded our sense of what counts as American literature ... what makes the Library of America so valuable is the risks it takes around the edges of what used to be American literature".

The Library of America has attracted a number of criticisms as well, including accusations of selection biases in favor of literary and political trends and the questionable inclusion of certain writers ostensibly non-canonical. An offshoot series put out in 1989 by Vintage Books that was associated with the Library of America name was faulted as overly commercial and exploitative. Even the marketing for the main series has been reproved as overbearing, in that it exaggerated the degree to which the preservation of American literature was in peril and the degree to which the Library of America was saving it.

The LOA has been satirized by the essayist Arthur Krystal as "confer[ing] value on writers by encasing their work in handsome black-jacketed covers with a stripe of red, white, and blue on the spine." The oft-perceived requirement that writers have passed from the scene led to one wry comment that "one sympathizes with the directors of a publishing venture increasingly dependent on the idea that great American writers just can't die fast enough." The series even prompted a mocking poem that began:

It's like heaven: you've got to die
To get there. And you can't be sure.
The publisher might go out of business.

In an April Fools' Day swipe at the Library of America's selection standards, another satirical piece proclaimed that the LOA "would publish volumes of Paris Hilton's and William Shatner's memoirs, and possibly those of Jersey Shore's Snooki." Images of the faux volumes were included.

In his 2001 book Book Business: Publishing Past, Present, and Future, LOA co-founder Jason Epstein, who by his own account had lost out in an internal power struggle and departed the venture, sharply criticized the Library of America's finances and what he saw as the publication of unnecessary anthologies and authors whose qualifications for the series were suspect. He concluded:

The Library of America has now published substantially all the work for which it was created and for which rights are available. Its obligation hereafter is to husband its resources so that this work remains in print and accessible to readers, and to ensure that funds are on hand for the publication of twentieth-century writers as rights permit.

What Edmund Wilson would think of the series as it has evolved is unknowable, but writing for The Antioch Review in 1986, the fellow Paul M. Wright ventures that "We might reasonably infer that he would be pleased but not, I think, entirely pleased." Less reservedly, the editor and commentator Norman Podhoretz, writing for Commentary in 1992, said that "the Library of America is as close to the kind of thing [Wilson] envisaged as it could conceivably be."

== Build and manufacture ==
The designer of the appearance of Library of America books is Bruce Campbell. When the first LOA volumes appeared in 1982, the "Book Design & Manufacturing" column of Publishers Weekly headlined that the series's physical appearance was "a triumph of the bookmaker's art".

The LOA uses paper that meets guidelines for permanence originally set out by a committee of the Council on Library Resources and subsequently by the American National Standards Institute. Each volume is printed on thin but opaque acid-free paper, allowing books ranging from 700 to 1,600 pages to remain fairly compact (although not as small as those in La Pléiade). The paper used means the books will last a very long time without crumbling or yellowing. All volumes in the main series have the same trim size, 4 7/8 inches (120 mm) by 7 7/8 inches (200 mm), dimensions that are based on the golden section. The weight of each volume is around 2 pounds (0.9 kg).

For the hardcover editions, the binding cloth is woven rayon, and the books are Smyth-sewn. Each includes a ribbon bookmark. Pages in the books will lie flat when open. The uniform typeface is Galliard.

The LOA publishes selected titles in paperback, mainly for the college textbook market.

=== Main series ===
#	Author	Title	Editor(s)	Year	ISBN
1	Herman Melville	Typee, Omoo, Mardi	G. Thomas Tanselle	1982	978-0-940450-00-4
2	Nathaniel Hawthorne	Tales and Sketches	Roy Harvey Pearce	1982	978-0-940450-03-5
3	Walt Whitman	Poetry and Prose	Justin Kaplan	1982	978-0-940450-02-8
4	Harriet Beecher Stowe	Three Novels	Kathryn Kish Sklar	1982	978-0-940450-01-1
5	Mark Twain	Mississippi Writings	Guy Cardwell	1982	978-0-940450-07-3
6	Jack London	Novels and Stories	Donald Pizer	1982	978-0-940450-05-9
7	Jack London	Novels and Social Writings	Donald Pizer	1982	978-0-940450-06-6
8	William Dean Howells	Novels 1875–1886	Edwin H. Cady	1982	978-0-940450-04-2
9	Herman Melville	Redburn, White-Jacket, Moby-Dick	G. Thomas Tanselle	1983	978-0-940450-09-7
10	Nathaniel Hawthorne	Collected Novels	Millicent Bell	1983	978-0-940450-08-0
11	Francis Parkman	France and England in North America: Volume One	David Levin	1983	978-0-940450-10-3
12	Francis Parkman	France and England in North America: Volume Two	David Levin	1983	978-0-940450-11-0
13	Henry James	Novels 1871–1880	William T. Stafford	1983	978-0-940450-13-4
14	Henry Adams	Novels, Mont Saint Michel, The Education	Ernest Samuels & Jayne N. Samuels	1983	978-0-940450-12-7
15	Ralph Waldo Emerson	Essays and Lectures	Joel Porte	1983	978-0-940450-15-8
16	Washington Irving	History, Tales and Sketches	James W. Tuttleton	1983	978-0-940450-14-1
17	Thomas Jefferson	Writings	Merrill D. Peterson	1984	978-0-940450-16-5
18	Stephen Crane	Prose and Poetry	J. C. Levenson	1984	978-0-940450-17-2
19	Edgar Allan Poe	Poetry and Tales	Patrick Quinn	1984	978-0-940450-18-9
20	Edgar Allan Poe	Essays and Reviews	G. R. Thompson	1984	978-0-940450-19-6
21	Mark Twain	The Innocents Abroad, Roughing It	Guy Cardwell	1984	978-0-940450-25-7
22	Henry James	Literary Criticism: Essays on Literature, American Writers, English Writers	Leon Edel & Mark Wilson	1984	978-0-940450-22-6
23	Henry James	Literary Criticism: French Writers, Other European Writers, Prefaces to the New York Edition	Leon Edel & Mark Wilson	1984	978-0-940450-23-3
24	Herman Melville	Pierre, Israel Potter, The Piazza Tales, The Confidence-Man, Billy Budd, Uncollected Prose	Harrison Hayford	1985	978-0-940450-24-0
25	William Faulkner	Novels 1930–1935	Joseph Blotner & Noel Polk	1985	978-0-940450-26-4
26	James Fenimore Cooper	The Leatherstocking Tales: Volume One	Blake Nevius	1985	978-0-940450-20-2
27	James Fenimore Cooper	The Leatherstocking Tales: Volume Two	Blake Nevius	1985	978-0-940450-21-9
28	Henry David Thoreau	A Week, Walden, The Maine Woods, Cape Cod	Robert F. Sayre	1985	978-0-940450-27-1
29	Henry James	Novels 1881–1886	William T. Stafford	1985	978-0-940450-30-1
30	Edith Wharton	Novels	R. W. B. Lewis	1986	978-0-940450-31-8
31	Henry Adams	History of the United States during the Administrations of Thomas Jefferson (1801–1809)	Earl N. Harbert	1986	978-0-940450-34-9
32	Henry Adams	History of the United States during the Administrations of James Madison (1809–1817)	Earl N. Harbert	1986	978-0-940450-35-6
33	Frank Norris	Novels and Essays	Donald Pizer	1986	978-0-940450-40-0
34	W. E. B. Du Bois	Writings	Nathan Huggins	1986	978-0-940450-33-2
35	Willa Cather	Early Novels and Stories	Sharon O'Brien	1987	978-0-940450-39-4
36	Theodore Dreiser	Sister Carrie, Jennie Gerhardt, Twelve Men	Richard Lehan	1987	978-0-940450-41-7
37.1	Benjamin Franklin	Silence Dogood, The Busy-Body, and Early Writings	J. A. Leo Lemay	1987	978-1-931082-22-8
37.2	Benjamin Franklin	Autobiography, Poor Richard, and Later Writings	J. A. Leo Lemay	1987	978-1-883011-53-6
38	William James	Writings 1902–1910	Bruce Kuklick	1987	978-0-940450-38-7
39	Flannery O'Connor	Collected Works	Sally Fitzgerald	1988	978-0-940450-37-0
40	Eugene O'Neill	Complete Plays 1913–1920	Travis Bogard	1988	978-0-940450-48-6
41	Eugene O'Neill	Complete Plays 1920–1931	Travis Bogard	1988	978-0-940450-49-3
42	Eugene O'Neill	Complete Plays 1932–1943	Travis Bogard	1988	978-0-940450-50-9
43	Henry James	Novels 1886–1890	Daniel Mark Fogel	1989	978-0-940450-56-1
44	William Dean Howells	Novels 1886–1888	Don L. Cook	1989	978-0-940450-51-6
45	Abraham Lincoln	Speeches and Writings 1832–1858	Don E. Fehrenbacher	1989	978-0-940450-43-1
46	Abraham Lincoln	Speeches and Writings 1859–1865	Don E. Fehrenbacher	1989	978-0-940450-63-9
47	Edith Wharton	Novellas and Other Writings	Cynthia Griffin Wolff	1990	978-0-940450-53-0
48	William Faulkner	Novels 1936–1940	Joseph Blotner & Noel Polk	1990	978-0-940450-55-4
49	Willa Cather	Later Novels	Sharon O'Brien	1990	978-0-940450-52-3
50	Ulysses S. Grant	Memoirs and Selected Letters	Mary Drake McFeeley & William S. McFeeley	1990	978-0-940450-58-5
51	William Tecumseh Sherman	Memoirs of General W. T. Sherman	Charles Royster	1990	978-0-940450-65-3
52	Washington Irving	Bracebridge Hall, Tales of a Traveller, The Alhambra	Andrew B. Myers	1991	978-0-940450-59-2
53	Francis Parkman	The Oregon Trail and The Conspiracy of Pontiac	William R. Taylor	1991	978-0-940450-54-7
54	James Fenimore Cooper	Sea Tales	Kay Seymour House & Thomas Philbrick	1991	978-0-940450-70-7
55	Richard Wright	Early Works	Arnold Rampersad	1991	978-0-94045066-0
56	Richard Wright	Later Works	Arnold Rampersad	1991	978-0-940450-67-7
57	Willa Cather	Stories, Poems, and Other Writings	Sharon O'Brien	1991	978-0-940450-71-4
58	William James	Writings 1878–1899	Gerald E. Myers	1992	978-0-940450-72-1
59	Sinclair Lewis	Main Street and Babbitt	John Hersey	1992	978-0-940450-61-5
60	Mark Twain	Collected Tales, Sketches, Speeches, and Essays 1852–1890	Louis J. Budd	1992	978-0-940450-36-3
61	Mark Twain	Collected Tales, Sketches, Speeches, and Essays 1891–1910	Louis J. Budd	1992	978-0-940450-73-8
62	various	The Debate on the Constitution: Part One: September 1787 to February 1788	Bernard Bailyn	1993	978-0-940450-42-4
63	various	The Debate on the Constitution: Part Two: January to August 1788	Bernard Bailyn	1993	978-0-940450-64-6
64	Henry James	Collected Travel Writings: Great Britain and America	Richard Howard	1993	978-0-940450-76-9
65	Henry James	Collected Travel Writings: The Continent	Richard Howard	1993	978-0-940450-77-6
66	various	American Poetry: The Nineteenth Century, Volume One: Freneau to Whitman	John Hollander	1993	978-0-940450-60-8
67	various	American Poetry: The Nineteenth Century, Volume Two: Melville to Stickney, American Indian Poetry, Folk Songs and Spirituals	John Hollander	1993	978-0-940450-78-3
68	Frederick Douglass	Autobiographies	Henry Louis Gates Jr.	1994	978-0-940450-79-0
69	Sarah Orne Jewett	Novels and Stories	Michael Davitt Bell	1994	978-0-940450-74-5
70	Ralph Waldo Emerson	Collected Poems and Translations	Harold Bloom & Paul Kane	1994	978-0-940450-28-8
71	Mark Twain	Historical Romances	Susan K. Harris	1994	978-0-940450-82-0
72	John Steinbeck	Novels and Stories 1932–1937	Robert DeMott & Elaine A. Steinbeck	1994	978-1-883011-01-7
73	William Faulkner	Novels 1942–1954	Joseph Blotner & Noel Polk	1994	978-0-940450-85-1
74	Zora Neale Hurston	Novels and Stories	Cheryl A. Wall	1995	978-0-940450-83-7
75	Zora Neale Hurston	Folklore, Memoirs, and Other Writings	Cheryl A. Wall	1995	978-0-940450-84-4
76	Thomas Paine	Collected Writings	Eric Foner	1995	978-1-883011-03-1
77	various	Reporting World War II: American Journalism 1938–1944	Samuel Hynes, Anne Matthews, et al.	1995	978-1-883011-04-8
78	various	Reporting World War II: American Journalism 1944–1946	Samuel Hynes, Anne Matthews, et al.	1995	978-1-883011-05-5
79	Raymond Chandler	Stories and Early Novels	Frank MacShane	1995	978-1-883011-07-9
80	Raymond Chandler	Later Novels and Other Writings	Frank MacShane	1995	978-1-883011-08-6
81	Robert Frost	Collected Poems, Prose, and Plays	Richard Poirier & Mark Richardson	1995	978-1-883011-06-2
82	Henry James	Complete Stories 1892–1898	John Hollander & David Bromwich	1996	978-1-883011-09-3
83	Henry James	Complete Stories 1898–1910	Denis Donoghue	1996	978-1-883011-10-9
84	William Bartram	Travels and Other Writings	Thomas Slaughter	1996	978-1-883011-11-6
85	John Dos Passos	U.S.A.	Townsend Ludington & Daniel Aaron	1996	978-1-883011-14-7
86	John Steinbeck	The Grapes of Wrath and Other Writings 1936–1941	Robert DeMott & Elaine A. Steinbeck	1996	978-1-883011-15-4
87	Vladimir Nabokov	Novels and Memoirs 1941–1953	Brian Boyd	1996	978-1-883011-18-5
88	Vladimir Nabokov	Novels 1955–1962	Brian Boyd	1996	978-1-883011-19-2
89	Vladimir Nabokov	Novels 1969–1974	Brian Boyd	1996	978-1-883011-20-8
90	James Thurber	Writings and Drawings	Garrison Keillor	1996	978-1-883011-22-2
91	George Washington	Writings	John Rhodehamel	1997	978-1-883011-23-9
92	John Muir	Nature Writings	William Cronon	1997	978-1-883011-24-6
93	Nathanael West	Novels and Other Writings	Sacvan Bercovitch	1997	978-1-883011-28-4
94	various	Crime Novels: American Noir of the 1930s and 40s	Robert Polito	1997	978-1-883011-46-8
95	various	Crime Novels: American Noir of the 1950s	Robert Polito	1997	978-1-883011-49-9
96	Wallace Stevens	Collected Poetry and Prose	Frank Kermode & Joan Richardson	1997	978-1-883011-45-1
97	James Baldwin	Early Novels and Stories	Toni Morrison	1998	978-1-883011-51-2
98	James Baldwin	Collected Essays	Toni Morrison	1998	978-1-883011-52-9
99	Gertrude Stein	Writings 1903–1932	Catharine R. Stimpson & Harriet Chessman	1998	978-1-883011-40-6
100	Gertrude Stein	Writings 1932–1946	Catharine R. Stimpson & Harriet Chessman	1998	978-1-883011-41-3
101	Eudora Welty	Complete Novels	Richard Ford & Michael Kreyling	1998	978-1-883011-54-3
102	Eudora Welty	Stories, Essays, and Memoir	Richard Ford & Michael Kreyling	1998	978-1-883011-55-0
103	Charles Brockden Brown	Three Gothic Novels	Sydney J. Krause	1998	978-1-883011-57-4
104	various	Reporting Vietnam: American Journalism 1959–1969	Milton J. Bates, Lawrence Lichty, et al.	1998	978-1-883011-58-1
105	various	Reporting Vietnam: American Journalism 1969–1975	Milton J. Bates, Lawrence Lichty, et al.	1998	978-1-883011-59-8
106	Henry James	Complete Stories 1874–1884	William L. Vance	1999	978-1-883011-63-5
107	Henry James	Complete Stories 1884–1891	Edward Said	1999	978-1-883011-64-2
108	various	American Sermons: The Pilgrims to Martin Luther King Jr.	Michael Warner	1999	978-1-883011-65-9
109	James Madison	Writings	Jack N. Rakove	1999	978-1-883011-66-6
110	Dashiell Hammett	Complete Novels	Steven Marcus	1999	978-1-883011-67-3
111	Henry James	Complete Stories 1864–1874	Jean Strouse	1999	978-1-883011-70-3
112	William Faulkner	Novels 1957–1962	Noel Polk & Joseph Blotner	1999	978-1-883011-69-7
113	John James Audubon	Writings and Drawings	Christoph Irmscher	1999	978-1-883011-68-0
114	various	Slave Narratives	William L. Andrews & Henry Louis Gates Jr.	2000	978-1-883011-76-5
115	various	American Poetry: The Twentieth Century, Volume One: Henry Adams to Dorothy Parker	Robert Hass, John Hollander, et al.	2000	978-1-883011-77-2
116	various	American Poetry: The Twentieth Century, Volume Two: E.E. Cummings to May Swenson	Robert Hass, John Hollander, et al.	2000	978-1-883011-78-9
117	F. Scott Fitzgerald	Novels and Stories 1920–1922	Jackson R. Bryer	2000	978-1-883011-84-0
118	Henry Wadsworth Longfellow	Poems and Other Writings	J. D. McClatchy	2000	978-1-883011-85-7
119	Tennessee Williams	Plays 1937–1955	Mel Gussow & Kenneth Holditch	2000	978-1-883011-86-4
120	Tennessee Williams	Plays 1957–1980	Mel Gussow & Kenneth Holditch	2000	978-1-883011-87-1
121	Edith Wharton	Collected Stories 1891–1910	Maureen Howard	2001	978-1-883011-93-2
122	Edith Wharton	Collected Stories 1911–1937	Maureen Howard	2001	978-1-883011-94-9
123	various	The American Revolution: Writings from the War of Independence 1775–1783	John Rhodehamel	2001	978-1-883011-91-8
124	Henry David Thoreau	Collected Essays and Poems	Elizabeth Hall Witherell	2001	978-1-883011-95-6
125	Dashiell Hammett	Crime Stories and Other Writings	Steven Marcus	2001	978-1-931082-00-6
126	Dawn Powell	Novels 1930–1942	Tim Page	2001	978-1-931082-01-3
127	Dawn Powell	Novels 1944–1962	Tim Page	2001	978-1-931082-02-0
128	Carson McCullers	Complete Novels	Carlos L. Dews	2001	978-1-931082-03-7
129	Alexander Hamilton	Writings	Joanne B. Freeman	2001	978-1-931082-04-4
130	Mark Twain	The Gilded Age and Later Novels	Hamlin L. Hill	2002	978-1-931082-10-5
131	Charles W. Chesnutt	Stories, Novels, and Essays	Werner Sollors	2002	978-1-931082-06-8
132	John Steinbeck	Novels 1942–1952	Robert DeMott	2002	978-1-931082-07-5
133	Sinclair Lewis	Arrowsmith, Elmer Gantry, Dodsworth	Richard Lingeman	2002	978-1-931082-08-2
134	Paul Bowles	The Sheltering Sky, Let It Come Down, The Spider's House	Daniel Halpern	2002	978-1-931082-19-8
135	Paul Bowles	Complete Stories and Later Writings	Daniel Halpern	2002	978-1-931082-20-4
136	Kate Chopin	Complete Novels and Stories	Sandra M. Gilbert	2002	978-1-931082-21-1
137	various	Reporting Civil Rights: American Journalism 1941–1963	Clayborne Carson, David J. Garrow, et al.	2003	978-1-931082-28-0
138	various	Reporting Civil Rights: American Journalism 1963–1973	Clayborne Carson, David J. Garrow, et al.	2003	978-1-931082-29-7
139	Henry James	Novels 1896–1899	Myra Jehlen	2003	978-1-931082-30-3
140	Theodore Dreiser	An American Tragedy	Thomas P. Riggio	2003	978-1-931082-31-0
141	Saul Bellow	Novels 1944–1953	James Wood	2003	978-1-931082-38-9
142	John Dos Passos	Novels 1920–1925	Townsend Ludington	2003	978-1-931082-39-6
143	John Dos Passos	Travel Books and Other Writings 1916–1941	Townsend Ludington	2003	978-1-931082-40-2
144	Ezra Pound	Poems and Translations	Richard Sieburth	2003	978-1-931082-41-9
145	James Weldon Johnson	Writings	William L. Andrews	2004	978-1-931082-52-5
146	Washington Irving	Three Western Narratives	James P. Ronda	2004	978-1-931082-53-2
147	Alexis de Tocqueville	Democracy in America	Olivier Zunz	2004	978-1-931082-54-9
148	James T. Farrell	Studs Lonigan: A Trilogy	Pete Hamill	2004	978-1-931082-55-6
149	Isaac Bashevis Singer	Collected Stories: Gimpel the Fool to The Letter Writer	Ilan Stavans	2004	978-1-931082-61-7
150	Isaac Bashevis Singer	Collected Stories: A Friend of Kafka to Passions	Ilan Stavans	2004	978-1-931082-62-4
151	Isaac Bashevis Singer	Collected Stories: One Night in Brazil to The Death of Methuselah	Ilan Stavans	2004	978-1-931082-63-1
152	George S. Kaufman & Co.	Broadway Comedies	Laurence Maslon	2004	978-1-931082-67-9
153	Theodore Roosevelt	The Rough Riders, An Autobiography	Louis Auchincloss	2004	978-1-931082-65-5
154	Theodore Roosevelt	Letters and Speeches	Louis Auchincloss	2004	978-1-931082-66-2
155	H. P. Lovecraft	Tales	Peter Straub	2005	978-1-931082-72-3
156	Louisa May Alcott	Little Women, Little Men, Jo's Boys	Elaine Showalter	2005	978-1-931082-73-0
157	Philip Roth	Novels and Stories 1959–1962	Ross Miller	2005	978-1-931082-79-2
158	Philip Roth	Novels 1967–1972	Ross Miller	2005	978-1-931082-80-8
159	James Agee	Let Us Now Praise Famous Men, A Death in the Family, and Shorter Fiction	Michael Sragow	2005	978-1-931082-81-5
160	James Agee	Film Writing and Selected Journalism	Michael Sragow	2005	978-1-931082-82-2
161	Richard Henry Dana Jr.	Two Years Before the Mast and Other Voyages	Thomas L. Philbrick	2005	978-1-931082-83-9
162	Henry James	Novels 1901–1902	Leo Bersani	2006	978-1-931082-88-4
163	Arthur Miller	Collected Plays 1944–1961	Tony Kushner	2006	978-1-931082-91-4
164	William Faulkner	Novels 1926–1929	Joseph Blotner & Noel Polk	2006	978-1-931082-89-1
165	Philip Roth	Novels 1973–1977	Ross Miller	2006	978-1-931082-96-9
166	various	American Speeches: Political Oratory from the Revolution to the Civil War	Ted Widmer	2006	978-1-931082-97-6
167	various	American Speeches: Political Oratory from Abraham Lincoln to Bill Clinton	Ted Widmer	2006	978-1-931082-98-3
168	Hart Crane	Complete Poems and Selected Letters	Langdon Hammer	2006	978-1-931082-99-0
169	Saul Bellow	Novels 1956–1964	James Wood	2007	978-1-59853-002-5
170	John Steinbeck	Travels with Charley and Later Novels 1947–1962	Robert DeMott & Brian Railsback	2007	978-1-59853-004-9
171	Capt. John Smith	Writings, with Other Narratives of Roanoke, Jamestown, and the First English Settlement of America	James Horn	2007	978-1-59853-001-8
172	Thornton Wilder	Collected Plays and Writings on Theater	J. D. McClatchy	2007	978-1-59853-003-2
173	Philip K. Dick	Four Novels of the 1960s	Jonathan Lethem	2007	978-1-59853-009-4
174	Jack Kerouac	Road Novels 1957–1960	Douglas Brinkley	2007	978-1-59853-012-4
175	Philip Roth	Zuckerman Bound: A Trilogy and Epilogue 1979–1985	Ross Miller	2007	978-1-59853-011-7
176	Edmund Wilson	Literary Essays and Reviews of the 1920s and 30s	Lewis M. Dabney	2007	978-1-59853-013-1
177	Edmund Wilson	Literary Essays and Reviews of the 1930s and 40s	Lewis M. Dabney	2007	978-1-59853-014-8
178	various	American Poetry: The Seventeenth and Eighteenth Centuries	David S. Shields	2007	978-1-931082-90-7
179	William Maxwell	Early Novels and Stories	Christopher Carduff	2008	978-1-59853-026-1
180	Elizabeth Bishop	Poems, Prose, and Letters	Robert Giroux & Lloyd Schwartz	2008	978-1-59853-017-9
181	A. J. Liebling	World War II Writings	Pete Hamill	2008	978-1-59853-040-7
182	various	American Earth: Environmental Writing Since Thoreau	Bill McKibben	2008	978-1-59853-020-9
183	Philip K. Dick	Five Novels of the 1960s and 70s	Jonathan Lethem	2008	978-1-59853-025-4
184	William Maxwell	Later Novels and Stories	Christopher Carduff	2008	978-1-59853-026-1
185	Philip Roth	Novels and Other Narratives 1986–1991	Ross Miller	2008	978-1-59853-030-8
186	Katherine Anne Porter	Collected Stories and Other Writings	Darlene Harbour Unrue	2008	978-1-59853-029-2
187	John Ashbery	Collected Poems 1956–1987	Mark Ford	2008	978-1-59853-028-5
188	John Cheever	Collected Stories and Other Writings	Blake Bailey	2009	978-1-59853-034-6
189	John Cheever	Complete Novels	Blake Bailey	2009	978-1-59853-035-3
190	Lafcadio Hearn	American Writings	Christopher Benfey	2009	978-1-59853-039-1
191	A. J. Liebling	The Sweet Science and Other Writings	Pete Hamill	2009	978-1-59853-040-7
192	various	The Lincoln Anthology: Great Writers on His Life and Legacy from 1860 to Now	Harold Holzer	2009	978-1-59853-033-9
193	Philip K. Dick	VALIS and Later Novels	Jonathan Lethem	2009	978-1-59853-044-5
194	Thornton Wilder	The Bridge of San Luis Rey and Other Novels 1926–1948	J. D. McClatchy	2009	978-1-59853-045-2
195	Raymond Carver	Collected Stories	William L. Stull & Maureen P. Carroll	2009	978-1-59853-046-9
196	various	American Fantastic Tales: Terror and the Uncanny from Poe to the Pulps	Peter Straub	2009	978-1-59853-047-6
197	various	American Fantastic Tales: Terror and the Uncanny from the 1940s to Now	Peter Straub	2009	978-1-59853-048-3
198	John Marshall	Writings	Charles F. Hobson	2010	978-1-59853-064-3
199	various	The Mark Twain Anthology: Great Writers on His Life and Works	Shelley Fisher Fishkin	2010	978-1-59853-065-0
200	Mark Twain	A Tramp Abroad, Following the Equator, Other Travels	Roy Blount Jr.	2010	978-1-59853-066-7
201	Ralph Waldo Emerson	Selected Journals 1820–1842	Lawrence Rosenwald	2010	978-1-59853-067-4
202	Ralph Waldo Emerson	Selected Journals 1841–1877	Lawrence Rosenwald	2010	978-1-59853-068-1
203	various	The American Stage: Writing on Theater from Washington Irving to Tony Kushner	Laurence Senelick	2010	978-1-59853-069-8
204	Shirley Jackson	Novels and Stories	Joyce Carol Oates	2010	978-1-59853-072-8
205	Philip Roth	Novels 1993–1995	Ross Miller	2010	978-1-59853-078-0
206	H. L. Mencken	Prejudices: First, Second, and Third Series	Marion Elizabeth Rodgers	2010	978-1-59853-074-2
207	H. L. Mencken	Prejudices: Fourth, Fifth, and Sixth Series	Marion Elizabeth Rodgers	2010	978-1-59853-075-9
208	John Kenneth Galbraith	The Affluent Society and Other Writings 1952–1967	James K. Galbraith	2010	978-1-59853-077-3
209	Saul Bellow	Novels 1970–1982	James Wood	2010	978-1-59853-079-7
210	Lynd Ward	Gods' Man, Madman's Drum, Wild Pilgrimage	Art Spiegelman	2010	978-1-59853-080-3
211	Lynd Ward	Prelude to a Million Years, Song Without Words, Vertigo	Art Spiegelman	2010	978-1-59853-081-0
212	various	The Civil War: The First Year Told by Those Who Lived It	Brooks D. Simpson, Stephen W. Sears, et al.	2011	978-1-59853-088-9
213	John Adams	Revolutionary Writings 1755–1775	Gordon S. Wood	2011	978-1-59853-089-6
214	John Adams	Revolutionary Writings 1775–1783	Gordon S. Wood	2011	978-1-59853-090-2
215	Henry James	Novels 1903–1911	Ross Posnock	2011	978-1-59853-091-9
216	Kurt Vonnegut	Novels and Stories 1963–1973	Sidney Offit	2011	978-1-59853-098-8
217	various	Harlem Renaissance: Five Novels of the 1920s	Rafia Zafar	2011	978-1-59853-099-5
218	various	Harlem Renaissance: Five Novels of the 1930s	Rafia Zafar	2011	978-1-59853-101-5
219	Ambrose Bierce	The Devil's Dictionary, Tales, and Memoirs	S. T. Joshi	2011	978-1-59853-102-2
220	Philip Roth	The American Trilogy 1997–2000	Ross Miller	2011	978-1-59853-103-9
221	various	The Civil War: The Second Year Told by Those Who Lived It	Stephen W. Sears	2012	978-1-59853-144-2
222	Barbara W. Tuchman	The Guns of August, The Proud Tower	Margaret MacMillan	2012	978-1-59853-145-9
223	Arthur Miller	Collected Plays 1964–1982	Tony Kushner	2012	978-1-59853-147-3
224	Thornton Wilder	The Eighth Day, Theophilus North, Autobiographical Writings	J. D. McClatchy	2012	978-1-59853-146-6
225	David Goodis	Five Noir Novels of the 1940s and 50s	Robert Polito	2012	978-1-59853-148-0
226	Kurt Vonnegut	Novels and Stories 1950–1962	Sidney Offit	2012	978-1-59853-150-3
227	various	American Science Fiction: Four Classic Novels 1953–1956	Gary K. Wolfe	2012	978-1-59853-158-9
228	various	American Science Fiction: Five Classic Novels 1956–1958	Gary K. Wolfe	2012	978-1-59853-159-6
229	Laura Ingalls Wilder	The Little House Books, Volume 1	Caroline Fraser	2012	978-1-59853-160-2
230	Laura Ingalls Wilder	The Little House Books, Volume 2	Caroline Fraser	2012	978-1-59853-161-9
231	Jack Kerouac	Collected Poems	Marilène Phipps-Kettlewell	2012	978-1-59853-193-0
232	various	The War of 1812: Writings from America's Second War of Independence	Donald R. Hickey	2012	978-1-59853-195-4
233	various	American Antislavery Writings: Colonial Beginnings to Emancipation	James G. Basker	2012	978-1-59853-196-1
234	various	The Civil War: The Third Year Told by Those Who Lived It	Brooks D. Simpson	2013	978-1-59853-197-8
235	Sherwood Anderson	Collected Stories	Charles Baxter	2013	978-1-59853-204-3
236	Philip Roth	Novels 2001–2007	Ross Miller	2013	978-1-59853-198-5
237	Philip Roth	Nemeses	Ross Miller	2013	978-1-59853-199-2
238	Aldo Leopold	A Sand County Almanac and Other Writings on Ecology and Conservation	Curt Meine	2013	978-1-59853-206-7
239	May Swenson	Collected Poems	Langdon Hammer	2013	978-1-59853-210-4
240	W. S. Merwin	Collected Poems 1952–1993	J. D. McClatchy	2013	978-1-59853-208-1
241	W. S. Merwin	Collected Poems 1996–2011	J. D. McClatchy	2013	978-1-59853-209-8
242	John Updike	Collected Early Stories	Christopher Carduff	2013	978-1-59853-251-7
243	John Updike	Collected Later Stories	Christopher Carduff	2013	978-1-59853-252-4
244	Ring Lardner	Stories and Other Writings	Ian Frazier	2013	978-1-59853-253-1
245	Jonathan Edwards	Writings from the Great Awakening	Philip F. Gura	2013	978-1-59853-254-8
246	Susan Sontag	Essays of the 1960s and 70s	David Rieff	2013	978-1-59853-255-5
247	William Wells Brown	Clotel and Other Writings	Ezra Greenspan	2014	978-1-59853-291-3
248	Bernard Malamud	Novels and Stories of the 1940s and 50s	Philip Davis	2014	978-1-59853-292-0
249	Bernard Malamud	Novels and Stories of the 1960s	Philip Davis	2014	978-1-59853-293-7
250	various	The Civil War: The Final Year Told by Those Who Lived It	Aaron Sheehan-Dean	2014	978-1-59853-294-4
251	various	Shakespeare in America: An Anthology from the Revolution to Now	James Shapiro	2014	978-1-59853-295-1
252	Kurt Vonnegut	Novels 1976–1985	Sidney Offit	2014	978-1-59853-304-0
253	various	American Musicals 1927–1949: The Complete Books and Lyrics of Eight Broadway Classics	Laurence Maslon	2014	978-1-59853-258-6
254	various	American Musicals 1950–1969: The Complete Books and Lyrics of Eight Broadway Classics	Laurence Maslon	2014	978-1-59853-259-3
255	Elmore Leonard	Four Novels of the 1970s	Gregg Sutter	2014	978-1-59853-305-7
256	Louisa May Alcott	Work, Eight Cousins, Rose in Bloom, Stories and Other Writings	Susan Cheever	2014	978-1-59853-306-4
257	H. L. Mencken	The Days Trilogy, Expanded Edition	Marion Elizabeth Rodgers	2014	978-1-59853-308-8
258	Virgil Thomson	Music Chronicles 1940–1954	Tim Page	2014	978-1-59853-309-5
259	various	Art in America 1945–1970: Writings from the Age of Abstract Expressionism, Pop Art, and Minimalism	Jed Perl	2014	978-1-59853-310-1
260	Saul Bellow	Novels 1984–2000	James Wood	2015	978-1-59853-352-1
261	Arthur Miller	Collected Plays 1987–2004, with Stage and Radio Plays of the 1930s and 40s	Tony Kushner	2015	978-1-59853-353-8
262	Jack Kerouac	Visions of Cody, Visions of Gerard, Big Sur	Todd Tietchen	2015	978-1-59853-374-3
263	Reinhold Niebuhr	Major Works on Religion and Politics	Elisabeth Sifton	2015	978-1-59853-375-0
264	Ross Macdonald	Four Crime Novels of the 1950s	Tom Nolan	2015	978-1-59853-376-7
265	various	The American Revolution: Writings from the Pamphlet Debate: Volume 1, 1764–1772	Gordon S. Wood	2015	978-1-59853-377-4
266	various	The American Revolution: Writings from the Pamphlet Debate: Volume 2, 1773–1776	Gordon S. Wood	2015	978-1-59853-378-1
267	Elmore Leonard	Four Novels of the 1980s	Gregg Sutter	2015	978-1-59853-412-2
268	various	Women Crime Writers: Four Suspense Novels of the 1940s	Sarah Weinman	2015	978-1-59853-430-6
269	various	Women Crime Writers: Four Suspense Novels of the 1950s	Sarah Weinman	2015	978-1-59853-431-3
270	Frederick Law Olmsted	Writings on Landscape, Culture, and Society	Charles E. Beveridge	2015	978-1-59853-452-8
271	Edith Wharton	Four Novels of the 1920s	Hermione Lee	2015	978-1-59853-453-5
272	James Baldwin	Later Novels	Darryl Pinckney	2015	978-1-59853-454-2
273	Kurt Vonnegut	Novels 1987–1997	Sidney Offit	2016	978-1-59853-464-1
274	Henry James	Autobiographies	Philip Horne	2016	978-1-59853-471-9
275	Abigail Adams	Letters	Edith Gelles	2016	978-1-59853-465-8
276	John Adams	Writings from the New Nation 1784–1826	Gordon S. Wood	2016	978-1-59853-466-5
277	Virgil Thomson	The State of Music and Other Writings	Tim Page	2016	978-1-59853-467-2
278	various	War No More: Three Centuries of American Antiwar and Peace Writing	Lawrence Rosenwald	2016	978-1-59853-473-3
279	Ross Macdonald	Three Novels of the Early 1960s	Tom Nolan	2016	978-1-59853-479-5
280	Elmore Leonard	Four Later Novels	Gregg Sutter	2016	978-1-59853-492-4
281	Ursula K. Le Guin	The Complete Orsinia	Brian Attebery	2016	978-1-59853-493-1
282	John O'Hara	Stories	Charles McGrath	2016	978-1-59853-497-9
283	Jack Kerouac	The Unknown Kerouac: Rare, Unpublished and Newly Translated Writings	Todd Tietchen	2016	978-1-59853-498-6
284	Albert Murray	Collected Essays and Memoirs	Henry Louis Gates Jr. & Paul Devlin	2016	978-1-59853-503-7
285	Loren Eiseley	Collected Essays on Evolution, Nature, and the Cosmos, Volume One	William Cronon	2016	978-1-59853-506-8
286	Loren Eiseley	Collected Essays on Evolution, Nature, and the Cosmos, Volume Two	William Cronon	2016	978-1-59853-507-5
287	Carson McCullers	Stories, Plays and Other Writings	Carlos L. Dews	2017	978-1-59853-511-2
288	Jane Bowles	Collected Writings	Millicent Dillon	2017	978-1-59853-513-6
289	various	World War I and America: Told by the Americans Who Lived It	A. Scott Berg	2017	978-1-59853-514-3
290	Mary McCarthy	Novels and Stories 1942–1963	Thomas Mallon	2017	978-1-59853-516-7
291	Mary McCarthy	Novels 1963–1979	Thomas Mallon	2017	978-1-59853-517-4
292	Susan Sontag	Later Essays	David Rieff	2017	978-1-59853-519-8
293	John Quincy Adams	Diaries 1779–1821	David Waldstreicher	2017	978-1-59853-520-4
294	John Quincy Adams	Diaries 1821–1848	David Waldstreicher	2017	978-1-59853-522-8
295	Ross Macdonald	Four Later Novels	Tom Nolan	2017	978-1-59853-534-1
296	Ursula K. Le Guin	Hainish Novels and Stories, Volume One	Brian Attebery	2017	978-1-59853-538-9
297	Ursula K. Le Guin	Hainish Novels and Stories, Volume Two	Brian Attebery	2017	978-1-59853-539-6
298	Peter Taylor	Complete Stories 1938–1959	Ann Beattie	2017	978-1-59853-542-6
299	Peter Taylor	Complete Stories 1960–1992	Ann Beattie	2017	978-1-59853-543-3
300	Philip Roth	Why Write? Collected Nonfiction 1960–2013		2017	978-1-59853-540-2
301	John Ashbery	Complete Poems 1991‒2000	Mark Ford	2017	978-1-59853-535-8
302	Wendell Berry	Port William Novels and Stories: The Civil War to World War II	Jack Shoemaker	2018	978-1-59853-554-9
303	various	Reconstruction: Voices from America's First Great Struggle for Racial Equality	Brooks D. Simpson	2018	978-1-59853-555-6
304	Albert Murray	Collected Novels and Poems	Henry Louis Gates Jr. & Paul Devlin	2018	978-1-59853-561-7
305	Norman Mailer	Four Books of the 1960s	J. Michael Lennon	2018	978-1-59853-558-7
306	Norman Mailer	Collected Essays of the 1960s	J. Michael Lennon	2018	978-1-59853-559-4
307	Rachel Carson	Silent Spring and Other Writings on the Environment	Sandra Steingraber	2018	978-1-59853-560-0
308	Elmore Leonard	Westerns	Terrence Rafferty	2018	978-1-59853-562-4
309	Madeleine L'Engle	The Wrinkle in Time Quartet	Leonard S. Marcus	2018	978-1-59853-578-5
310	Madeleine L'Engle	The Polly O'Keefe Quartet	Leonard S. Marcus	2018	978-1-59853-579-2
311	John Updike	Novels 1959–1965	Christopher Carduff	2018	978-1-59853-581-5
312	James Fenimore Cooper	Two Novels of the American Revolution	Alan Taylor	2018	978-1-59853-582-2
313	John O'Hara	Four Novels of the 1930s	Steven Goldleaf	2019	978-1-59853-600-3
314	Ann Petry	The Street, The Narrows	Farah Jasmine Griffin	2019	978-1-59853-601-0
315	Ursula K. Le Guin	Always Coming Home (Author's Expanded Edition)	Brian Attebery	2019	978-1-59853-603-4
316	Wendell Berry	Essays 1969–1990	Jack Shoemaker	2019	978-1-59853-606-5
317	Wendell Berry	Essays 1993–2017	Jack Shoemaker	2019	978-1-59853-608-9
318	Cornelius Ryan	The Longest Day, A Bridge Too Far	Rick Atkinson	2019	978-1-59853-611-9
319	Booth Tarkington	Novels and Stories	Thomas Mallon	2019	978-1-59853-620-1
320	Herman Melville	Complete Poems	Hershel Parker	2019	978-1-59853-618-8
321	various	American Science Fiction: Four Classic Novels 1960–1966	Gary K. Wolfe	2019	978-1-59853-501-3
322	various	American Science Fiction: Four Classic Novels 1968–1969	Gary K. Wolfe	2019	978-1-59853-502-0
323	Frances Hodgson Burnett	The Secret Garden, A Little Princess, Little Lord Fauntleroy	Gretchen Holbrook Gerzina	2019	978-1-59853-638-6
324	Jean Stafford	Complete Novels	Kathryn Davis	2019	978-1-59853-644-7
325	Joan Didion	The 1960s and 70s	David L. Ulin	2019	978-1-59853-645-4
326	John Updike	Novels 1968–1975	Christopher Carduff	2020	978-1-59853-649-2
327	Constance Fenimore Woolson	Collected Stories	Anne Boyd Rioux	2020	978-1-59853-650-8
328	Robert Stone	Dog Soldiers, A Flag for Sunrise, Outerbridge Reach	Madison Smartt Bell	2020	978-1-59853-654-6
329	Jonathan Schell	The Fate of the Earth, The Abolition, The Unconquerable World	Martin J. Sherwin	2020	978-1-59853-658-4
330	Richard Hofstadter	Anti-Intellectualism in American Life, The Paranoid Style in American Politics, Uncollected Essays 1956–1965	Sean Wilentz	2020	978-1-59853-659-1
331	various	The Western: Four Classic Novels of the 1940s and 50s	Ron Hansen	2020	978-1-59853-661-4
332	various	American Women's Suffrage: Voices from the Long Struggle for the Vote 1776–1965	Susan Ware	2020	978-1-59853-664-5
333	various	African American Poetry: 250 Years of Struggle and Song	Kevin Young	2020	978-1-59853-666-9
334	Ernest Hemingway	The Sun Also Rises and Other Writings 1918–1926	Robert W. Trogdon	2020	978-1-59853-667-6
335	Ursula K. Le Guin	Annals of the Western Shore	Brian Attebery	2020	978-1-59853-668-3
336	Shirley Jackson	Four Novels of the 1940s and 50s	Ruth Franklin	2020	978-1-59853-670-6
337	various	Plymouth Colony	Lisa Brooks & Kelly Wisecup	2020	978-1-59853-673-7
338	Octavia E. Butler	Kindred, Fledgling, Collected Stories	Gerry Canavan & Nisi Shawl	2021	978-1-59853-675-1
339	John Updike	Novels 1978–1984	Christopher Carduff	2021	978-1-59853-677-5
340	Edward O. Wilson	Biophilia, The Diversity of Life, Naturalist	David Quammen	2021	978-1-59853-679-9
341	Joan Didion	The 1980s and 90s	David L. Ulin	2021	978-1-59853-683-6
342	Jean Stafford	Complete Stories and Other Writings	Kathryn Davis	2021	978-1-59853-682-9
343	Donald Barthelme	Collected Stories	Charles McGrath	2021	978-1-59853-684-3
344	Elizabeth Spencer	Novels and Stories	Michael Gorra	2021	978-1-59853-686-7
345	O. Henry	101 Stories	Ben Yagoda	2021	978-1-59853-690-4
346	S. J. Perelman	Writings	Adam Gopnik	2021	978-1-59853-692-8
347	Ray Bradbury	Novels and Story Cycles	Jonathan R. Eller	2021	978-1-59853-700-0
348	Virginia Hamilton	Five Novels	Julie K. Rubini	2021	978-1-59853-701-7
349	John Williams	Collected Novels	Daniel Mendelsohn	2021	978-1-59853-702-4
350	W. E. B. Du Bois	Black Reconstruction	Eric Foner & Henry Louis Gates Jr.	2021	978-1-59853-703-1
351	various	World War II Memoirs: The Pacific Theater	Elizabeth D. Samet	2021	978-1-59853-704-8
352	Rachel Carson	The Sea Trilogy	Sandra Steingraber	2021	978-1-59853-705-5
353	F. Scott Fitzgerald	The Great Gatsby, All the Sad Young Men and Other Writings 1920–1926	James L. W. West III	2022	978-1-59853-714-7
354	John Updike	Novels 1986–1990	Christopher Carduff	2022	978-1-59853-717-8
355	Maxine Hong Kingston	The Woman Warrior, China Men, Tripmaster Monkey, Hawaiʻi One Summer, and Other Writings	Viet Thanh Nguyen	2022	978-1-59853-724-6
356	Charlotte Perkins Gilman	Novels, Stories and Poems	Alfred Bendixen	2022	978-1-59853-719-2
357	Gary Snyder	Collected Poems	Jack Shoemaker & Anthony Hunt	2022	978-1-59853-721-5
358	Frederick Douglass	Speeches and Writings	David W. Blight	2022	978-1-59853-722-2
359	Bruce Catton	The Army of the Potomac Trilogy	Gary W. Gallagher	2022	978-1-59853-725-3
360	Ray Bradbury	The Illustrated Man, The October Country, Other Stories	Jonathan R. Eller	2022	978-1-59853-728-4
361	Rudolfo Anaya	Bless Me, Ultima; Tortuga; Alburquerque	Luis Alberto Urrea	2022	978-1-59853-729-1
362	Oscar Hijuelos	The Mambo Kings and Other Novels	Lori Marie Carlson-Hijuelos & Laura P. Alonso-Gall	2022	978-1-59853-730-7
363	Don DeLillo	Three Novels of the 1980s	Mark Osteen	2022	978-1-59853-733-8
364	Norman Mailer	The Naked and the Dead and Selected Letters 1945–1946	J. Michael Lennon	2023	978-1-59853-743-7
365	John Updike	Novels 1996–2000	Christopher Carduff	2023	978-1-59853-744-4
366	various	Black Writers of the Founding Era	James G. Basker & Nicole Seary	2023	978-1-59853-734-5
367	Bernard Malamud	Novels and Stories of the 1970s and 80s	Philip Davis	2023	978-1-59853-745-1
368	Ursula K. Le Guin	Collected Poems	Harold Bloom	2023	978-1-59853-736-9
369	Charles Portis	Collected Works	Jay Jennings	2023	978-1-59853-746-8
370	various	Crime Novels: Five Classic Thrillers 1961–1964	Geoffrey O'Brien	2023	978-1-59853-737-6
371	various	Crime Novels: Four Classic Thrillers 1964–1969	Geoffrey O'Brien	2023	978-1-59853-738-3
372	Adrienne Kennedy	Collected Plays and Other Writings	Marc Robinson	2023	978-1-59853-751-2
373	Joanna Russ	Novels and Stories	Nicole Rudick	2023	978-1-59853-753-6
374	Don DeLillo	Mao II and Underworld	Mark Osteen	2023	978-1-59853-755-0
375	William Faulkner	Stories	Theresa M. Towner	2023	978-1-59853-752-9
376	various	Jim Crow: Voices from a Century of Struggle: Part One: 1876–1919	Tyina L. Steptoe	2024	978-1-59853-766-6
377	Jimmy Breslin	Essential Writings	Dan Barry	2024	978-1-59853-768-0
378	Helen Keller	Autobiographies and Other Writings	Kim E. Nielsen	2024	978-1-59853-772-7
379	Ursula K. Le Guin	Five Novels	Brian Attebery	2024	978-1-59853-773-4
380	Walker Percy	The Moviegoer and Other Novels 1961–1971	Paul Elie	2024	978-1-59853-775-8
381	Wendell Berry	Port William Novels and Stories: The Postwar Years	Jack Shoemaker	2024	978-1-59853-776-5
382	various	Latino Poetry	Rigoberto González	2024	978-1-59853-783-3
383	Ernest J. Gaines	Four Novels	John Wharton Lowe	2024	978-1-59853-790-1
384	Ernest Hemingway	A Farewell to Arms and Other Writings 1927–1932	Robert W. Trogdon	2024	978-1-59853-784-0
385	various	World War II Memoirs: The European Theater	Elizabeth D. Samet	2024	978-1-59853-785-7
386	Joan Didion	Memoirs and Later Writings	David L. Ulin	2024	978-1-59853-787-1
387	various	Jim Crow: Voices from a Century of Struggle: Part Two: 1919–1976	Tyina L. Steptoe	2025	978-1-59853-801-4
388	Margaret Fuller	Collected Writings	Brigitte Bailey, Noelle Baker & Megan Marshall	2025	978-1-59853-803-8
389	Hannah Arendt	The Origins of Totalitarianism, Expanded Edition	Jerome Kohn & Thomas Wild	2025	978-1-59853-806-9
390	John Quincy Adams	Speeches and Writings	David Waldstreicher	2025	978-1-59853-808-3
391	Gary Snyder	Essential Prose	Jack Shoemaker	2025	978-1-59853-810-6
392	John Guare	Plays	Tony Kushner, Michael Paller & Anne Cattaneo	2025	978-1-59853-816-8
393	Octavia E. Butler	Lilith's Brood: The Xenogenesis Trilogy	Imani Perry	2025	978-1-59853-818-2
394	various	The American Short Story: The Nineteenth Century, Volume I	John Stauffer	2025	978-1-59853-820-5
395	various	The American Short Story: The Nineteenth Century, Volume II	John Stauffer	2025	978-1-59853-822-9
396	George Templeton Strong	Civil War Diaries	Geoff Wisner	2025	978-1-59853-825-0
397	William Kennedy	The Albany Trilogy	Paul Grondahl	2026	978-1-59853-841-0
398	John McPhee	Encounters in Wild America	David Remnick	2026	978-1-59853-842-7
399	Jim Thompson	Five Noir Novels of the 1950s and 60s	Robert Polito	2026	978-1-59853-843-4
400	Ursula K. Le Guin	The Complete Earthsea, Volume One	Brian Attebery	2026	978-1-59853-850-2
401	Ursula K. Le Guin	The Complete Earthsea, Volume Two	Brian Attebery	2026	978-1-59853-851-9
402	Peter Straub	Three Novels of the 1970s	Emma Straub	2026	978-1-59853-854-0
403	E. L. Doctorow	Three Early Novels	Bruce Weber	2027	978-1-59853-877-9
404	Eleanor Roosevelt	Autobiographies and Political Writings, Volume One	Susan Ware	2027	978-1-59853-866-3
405	Eleanor Roosevelt	Autobiographies and Political Writings, Volume Two	Susan Ware	2027	978-1-59853-867-0
406	Wendell Berry	Port William Novels and Stories: The Final Years	Jack Shoemaker	2027	978-1-59853-870-0
407	James Tiptree Jr.	Novellas and Stories	Stephanie Burt	2027	978-1-59853-875-5

=== Special anthologies ===
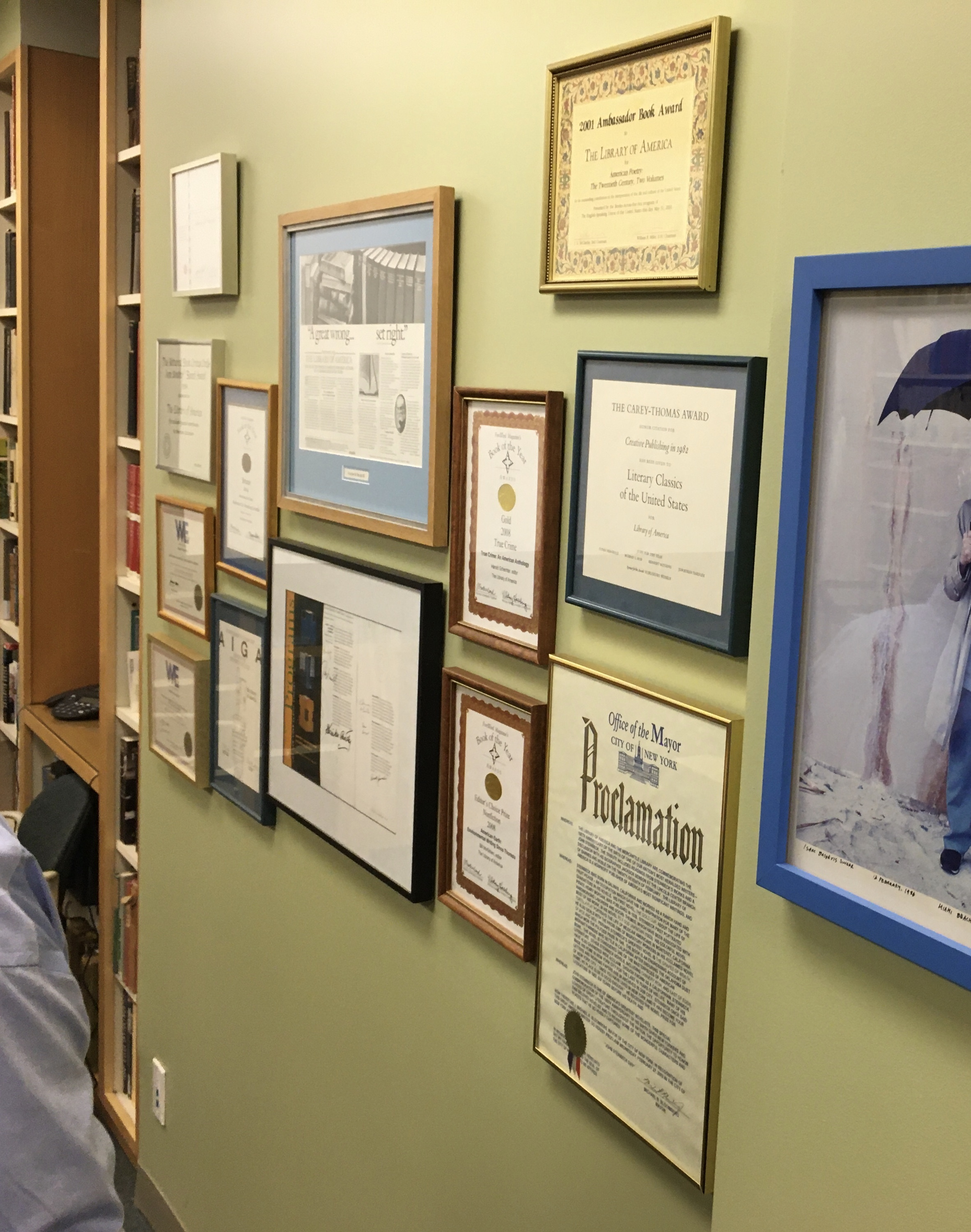
Wall containing commemorate plaques and other items, within the Library of America offices in New York

- Writing New York (Phillip Lopate, ed. 1998) ISBN 978-1-883011-62-8
- American Sea Writing (Peter Neill, ed. 2000) ISBN 978-1-883011-83-3
- Baseball (Nicholas Dawidoff, ed. 2002) ISBN 978-1-931082-09-9
- Writing Los Angeles (David L. Ulin, ed. 2002) ISBN 978-1-931082-27-3
- Americans in Paris (Adam Gopnik, ed. 2004) ISBN 1-931082-56-1
- American Writers at Home (J. D. McClatchy, author, Erica Lennar, photographer 2004) ISBN 978-1-931082-75-4
- American Movie Critics (Phillip Lopate, ed. 2006) ISBN 978-1-931082-92-1
- American Religious Poems (Harold Bloom and Jesse Zuba, eds., 2006) ISBN 978-1-931082-74-7
- American Food Writing (Molly O'Neill, ed., 2007) ISBN 978-1-59853-005-6
- True Crime: An American Anthology (Harold Schechter, ed., 2008) ISBN 978-1-59853-031-5
- Becoming Americans: Four Centuries of Immigrant Writing (Ilan Stavans, ed., 2009) ISBN 978-1-59853-051-3
- At the Fights: American Writers on Boxing (George Kimball and John Schulian, eds., 2011) ISBN 978-1-59853-092-6
- The 50 Funniest American Writers: An Anthology of Humor from Mark Twain to The Onion (Andy Borowitz ed., 2011) ISBN 978-1-59853-107-7
- Into the Blue: American Writing on Aviation and Spaceflight (Joseph J. Corn, ed., 2011) ISBN 978-1-59853-108-4
- The Cool School: Writing from America's Hip Underground (Glenn O'Brien, ed., 2013) ISBN 978-1-59853-256-2
- Football: Great Writing about the National Sport (John Schulian, ed., 2014) ISBN 978-1-59853-307-1
- Shake It Up: Great American Writing on Rock and Pop from Elvis to Jay Z (Kevin Dettmar and Jonathan Lethem, eds., 2017) ISBN 978-1-59853-531-0
- Basketball: Great Writing About America's Game (Alexander Wolff, ed., 2018) ISBN 978-1-59853-556-3
- Dance in America: A Reader's Anthology (Mindy Aloff, ed., 2018) ISBN 978-1-59853-584-6
- The Future Is Female! 25 Classic Science Fiction Stories by Women, from Pulp Pioneers to Ursula K. Le Guin (Lisa Yaszek, ed., 2018) ISBN 978-1-59853-580-8
- The Great American Sports Page: A Century of Classic Columns from Ring Lardner to Sally Jenkins (John Schulian, ed., 2019) ISBN 978-1-59853-612-6
- American Birds (Andrew Rubenfeld and Terry Tempest Williams, eds., 2020) ISBN 978-1-59853-655-3
- American Christmas Stories (Connie Willis, ed., 2021) ISBN 978-1-59853-706-2
- Women's Liberation! Feminist Writings that Inspired a Revolution and Still Can (Alix Kates Shulman and Honor Moore, eds., 2021) ISBN 978-1-59853-678-2
- The Future Is Female! More Classic Science Fiction Stories by Women (Lisa Yaszek, ed., 2022) ISBN 978-1-59853-732-1
- The Black Fantastic: 20 Afrofuturist Stories (André M. Carrington, ed., 2025) ISBN 978-1-59853-811-3
- American Flash Fiction: An Anthology (David L. Ulin, ed., 2026) ISBN 978-1-59853-853-3

=== American poets project ===
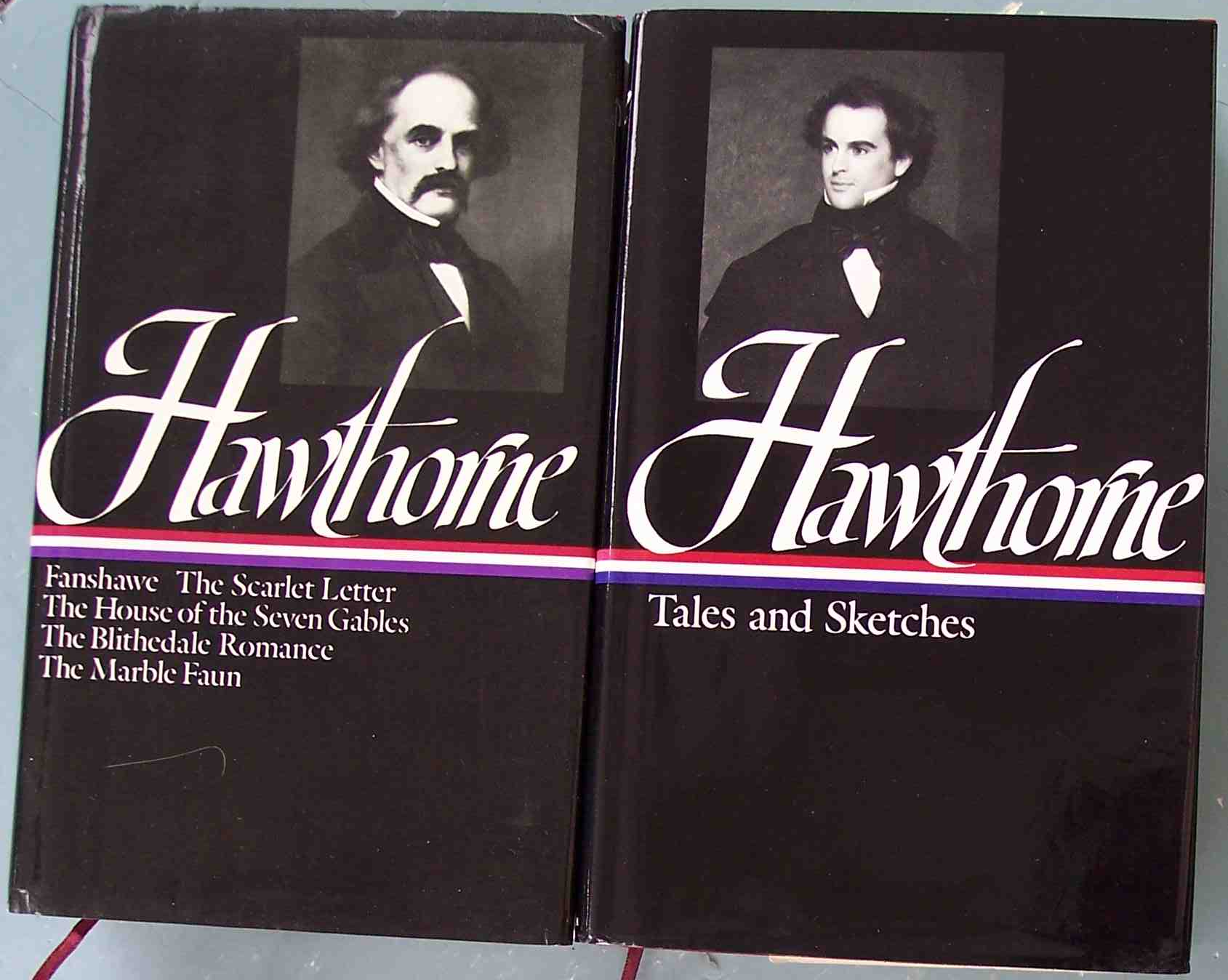
Two of Library of America's earliest volumes

- American Wits: An Anthology of Light Verse (John Hollander, editor 2003) ISBN 978-1-931082-49-5
- Edna St. Vincent Millay: Selected Poems (J. D. McClatchy, editor 2003) ISBN 978-1-931082-35-8
- Edgar Allan Poe: Poems and Poetics (Richard Wilbur, editor 2003) ISBN 978-1-931082-51-8
- Poets of World War II (Harvey Shapiro, editor 2003) ISBN 978-1-931082-33-4
- Karl Shapiro: Selected Poems (John Updike, editor 2003) ISBN 978-1-931082-34-1
- Walt Whitman: Selected Poems (Harold Bloom, editor 2003) ISBN 978-1-931082-32-7
- Yvor Winters: Selected Poems (Thom Gunn, editor 2003) ISBN 978-1-931082-50-1
- John Berryman: Selected Poems (Kevin Young, editor 2004) ISBN 978-1-931082-69-3
- Kenneth Fearing: Selected Poems (Robert Polito, editor 2004) ISBN 978-1-931082-57-0
- Amy Lowell: Selected Poems (Honor Moore, editor 2004) ISBN 978-1-931082-70-9
- Muriel Rukeyser: Selected Poems (Adrienne Rich, editor 2004) ISBN 978-1-931082-58-7
- John Greenleaf Whittier: Selected Poems (Brenda Wineapple, editor 2004) ISBN 978-1-931082-59-4
- William Carlos Williams: Selected Poems (Robert Pinsky, editor 2004) ISBN 978-1-931082-71-6
- The Essential Gwendolyn Brooks (Elizabeth Alexander, editor 2005) ISBN 978-1-931082-87-7
- Emma Lazarus: Selected Poems (John Hollander, editor 2005) ISBN 978-1-931082-77-8
- Samuel Menashe: New and Selected Poems (Christopher Ricks, editor 2005) ISBN 978-1-931082-85-3
- Poets of the Civil War (J. D. McClatchy, editor 2005) ISBN 978-1-931082-76-1
- Theodore Roethke: Selected Poems (Edward Hirsch, editor 2005) ISBN 978-1-931082-78-5
- Edith Wharton: Selected Poems (Louis Auchincloss, editor 2005) ISBN 978-1-931082-86-0
- A. R. Ammons: Selected Poems (David Lehman, editor 2006) ISBN 978-1-931082-93-8
- Cole Porter: Selected Lyrics (Robert Kimball, editor 2006) ISBN 978-1-931082-94-5
- Louis Zukofsky: Selected Poems (Charles Bernstein, editor 2006) ISBN 978-1-931082-95-2
- American Sonnets (David Bromwich, editor 2007) ISBN 978-1-59853-015-5
- Kenneth Koch: Selected Poems (Ron Padgett, editor 2007) ISBN 978-1-59853-006-3
- Carl Sandburg: Selected Poems (Paul Berman, editor 2007) ISBN 978-1-59853-100-8
- Anne Stevenson: Selected Poems (Andrew Motion, editor 2007) ISBN 978-1-59853-018-6
- James Agee: Selected Poems (Andrew Hudgins, editor 2008) ISBN 978-1-59853-032-2
- Ira Gershwin: Selected Lyrics (Robert Kimball, editor 2009) ISBN 978-1-59853-052-0
- Poems from the Women's Movement (Honor Moore, editor 2009) ISBN 978-1-59853-042-1
- Stephen Foster & Co.: Lyrics of America's First Great Popular Songs (Ken Emerson, editor 2010) ISBN 978-1-59853-070-4
- Stephen Crane: Complete Poems (Christopher Benfey, editor 2011) ISBN 978-1-59853-093-3
- Countee Cullen: Collected Poems (Major Jackson, editor 2013) ISBN 978-1-59853-083-4

=== Special publications ===
- Isaac Bashevis Singer: An Album (Ilan Stavans, editor, 2004) ISBN 978-1-931082-64-8
- Farber on Film: The Complete Film Writings of Manny Farber (Robert Polito, editor, 2009) ISBN 978-1-59853-050-6
- Hub Fans Bid Kid Adieu: John Updike on Ted Williams (2010) ISBN 978-1-59853-071-1
- The Age of Movies: Selected Writings of Pauline Kael (Sanford Schwartz, editor, 2011) ISBN 978-1-59853-109-1
- The Collected Writings of Joe Brainard (Ron Padgett, editor, 2012) ISBN 978-1-59853-149-7
- Edgar Rice Burroughs, A Princess of Mars (2012) ISBN 978-1-59853-165-7; Tarzan of the Apes (2012) ISBN 978-1-59853-164-0
- American Pastimes: The Very Best of Red Smith (Daniel Okrent, editor, 2013) ISBN 978-1-59853-217-3
- The Top of His Game: The Best Sportswriting of W. C. Heinz (Bill Littlefield, editor, 2015) ISBN 978-1-59853-372-9
- President Lincoln Assassinated!! The Firsthand Story of the Murder, Manhunt, Trial, and Mourning (Harold Holzer, editor, 2015) ISBN 978-1-59853-373-6
- String Theory: David Foster Wallace on Tennis (2016) ISBN 978-1-59853-480-1
- My Dearest Julia: The Wartime Letters of Ulysses S. Grant to His Wife (2018) ISBN 978-1-59853-589-1
- Harold Bloom, The American Canon: Literary Genius from Emerson to Pynchon (David Mikics, editor, 2019) ISBN 978-1-59853-640-9
- Kate Bolick, Jenny Zhang, Carmen Maria Machado, and Jane Smiley, March Sisters: On Life, Death, and Little Women (2019) ISBN 978-1-59853-628-7
- Where the Light Falls: Selected Stories of Nancy Hale (Lauren Groff, editor, 2019) ISBN 978-1-59853-642-3
- The Peanuts Papers: Writers and Cartoonists on Charlie Brown, Snoopy and the Gang, and the Meaning of Life (Andrew Blauner, editor, 2019) ISBN 978-1-59853-616-4
- Walt Whitman Speaks: His Final Thoughts on Life, Writing, Spirituality, and the Promise of America, as Told to Horace Traubel (Brenda Wineapple, editor, 2019) ISBN 978-1-59853-614-0
- American Conservatism: Reclaiming an Intellectual Tradition (Andrew J. Bacevich, editor, 2020) ISBN 978-1-59853-656-0
- American Democracy: 21 Historic Answers to 5 Urgent Questions (Nicholas Lemann, editor, 2020) ISBN 978-1-59853-662-1
- The Collected Breece D'J Pancake: Stories, Fragments, Letters (2020) ISBN 978-1-59853-672-0
- Dolores Hitchens, Sleep with Strangers (2021) ISBN 978-1-59853-697-3; Sleep with Slander (2021) ISBN 978-1-59853-698-0
- Molière, The Complete Richard Wilbur Translations, volume 1 (2021) ISBN 978-1-59853-707-9; volume 2 (2021) ISBN 978-1-59853-708-6
- Mary Jane Ward, The Snake Pit (2021) ISBN 978-1-59853-680-5
- Richard Wright, The Man Who Lived Underground (2021) ISBN 978-1-59853-676-8
- Hannah Arendt, On Lying and Politics (2022) ISBN 978-1-59853-731-4
- Edward Hirsch, The Heart of American Poetry (2022) ISBN 978-1-59853-726-0
- Ronald L. Fair, Many Thousand Gone: An American Fable (2023) ISBN 978-1-59853-763-5
- Nancy Hale, The Prodigal Women (2023) ISBN 978-1-59853-749-9
- John A. Williams, The Man Who Cried I Am (2023) ISBN 978-1-59853-761-1
- The MAD Files: Writers and Cartoonists on the Magazine that Warped America's Brain! (David Mikics, editor, 2024) ISBN 978-1-59853-792-5
- Jay Parini, Robert Frost: Sixteen Poems to Learn by Heart (2024) ISBN 978-1-59853-770-3
- S. J. Perelman, Cloudland Revisited: A Misspent Youth in Books and Film (2024) ISBN 978-1-59853-780-2; Crazy Like a Fox (2024) ISBN 978-1-59853-778-9
- Henry David Thoreau and Hannah Arendt, On Civil Disobedience (2024) ISBN 978-1-59853-791-8
- O. Henry for the Holidays: Seven Classic Thanksgiving and Christmas Stories (2025) ISBN 978-1-59853-833-5
- Sarah Ruden, I Am the Arrow: The Life and Art of Sylvia Plath in Six Poems (2025) ISBN 978-1-59853-813-7
- Ursula K. Le Guin's Book of Cats (2025) ISBN 978-1-59853-829-8
- Helen Vendler, Inhabit the Poem: Last Essays (2025) ISBN 978-1-59853-827-4
- The Testimony of Henry Adams, Freedman: Hope, Terror, and Exodus in the Post-Civil War South (2026) ISBN 978-1-59853-836-6
- Nathaniel Hawthorne, Parables, Fantasies, Fragments (Robert S. Levine, editor, 2026) ISBN 978-1-59853-860-1
- James Thurber, Thurber's Dogs (2026) ISBN 978-1-59853-856-4
- Walt Whitman, On Democracy (2026) ISBN 978-1-59853-846-5
- Ted Widmer, The Living Declaration: A Biography of America's Founding Text (2026) ISBN 978-1-59853-844-1
- Hannah Arendt, On Totalitarianism (2027) ISBN 978-1-59853-864-9
- Flannery O'Connor on Writing (2027) ISBN 978-1-59853-876-2
- Tracy K. Smith, On Dickinson (2027) ISBN 978-1-59853-873-1

== See also ==
- Bibliothèque de la Pléiade
