= Henry Adams (disambiguation) =

Henry Adams (1838–1918), was an American novelist, journalist, and historian.

Henry Adams may also refer to:

- Henry Adams (MP) (by 1532–1611), Welsh politician
- Henry Adams (farmer) (1583–1646), ancestor of U.S. presidents John Adams and John Quincy Adams
- Henry Adams (shipbuilder) (1713–1805), British shipbuilder
- Henry Adams (pastor) (1802–1872), American Baptist minister
- Henry Adams (Wisconsin politician) (1811–1871), American politician
- Henry Adams (zoologist) (1813–1877), English naturalist
- Henry Adams (activist) (1843–?), American civil rights activist
- Henry Adams (Australian politician) (1851–1926), South Australian politician
- Henry Adams (cricketer) (1853–1922), English cricketer
- Henry Adams (mechanical engineer) (1858–1929), American engineer
- Henry Adams (American football) (1915–2005), American football player
- Henry Adams (rower) (born 1980), British competitor at the 2001 World Rowing Championships
- Henry Cadwallader Adams (1817–1899), English cleric and writer of children's novels
- Henry Carter Adams (1851–1921), American economist
- Henry Cullen Adams (1850–1906), American politician
- Henry Foster Adams (1882–1973), American psychologist and writer
- Henry Gardiner Adams (c. 1811–1881), English author and anthologist
- Henry Lee Adams Jr. (born 1945), American lawyer and judge
- Henry Percy Adams (1865–1930), English architect
- Henry Adams, main character in Mark Twain's short story The Million Pound Bank Note

== See also ==
- Henry Adams Building, in Algona, Iowa, United States
- Harry Adams (disambiguation)
- Adams (surname)
