= Offit =

Offit is a surname. Notable people with the surname include:

- Kenneth Offit (born 1955), American cancer geneticist and oncologist
- Morris W. Offit (born c. 1937), American businessman
- Paul Offit (born 1951), American pediatrician
- Sidney Offit (born 1928), American writer

== See also ==
- Offutt (surname)
