= Offutt =

Offutt may refer to:

- Offutt (surname)
- Offutt, Kentucky
- Offutt Air Force Base, United States Air Force airbase in Sarpy County, Nebraska
- Offutt Field (Greensburg), Professional baseball and American football venue in Greensburg, Pennsylvania
