= Jehlen =

Jehlen is a surname. Notable people with the surname include:

- Myra Jehlen, American academic
- Patricia D. Jehlen (born 1943), American politician
