= Harold Adams =

Harold Adams may refer to:

- Richard Adams (British politician) (Harold Richard Adams, 1912–1978)
- Doug Adams (baseball) (Harold Douglas Adams, born 1943), American baseball player

== See also ==
- Harry Adams (disambiguation)
