= Harry Adams =

Harry Adams may refer to:

- Harry Adams (footballer) (1855–1910), Druids F.C. and Wales international footballer
- Harry Adams (baseball umpire) (1863–1941), Major League Baseball umpire
- Harry Adams (sport shooter) (1880–1968), American Olympic sport shooter
- Harry Adams (cricket umpire) (1881–1946), South African cricket umpire
- Harry F. Adams (1895–1977), American college sports coach, notably track and field coach for the University of Montana
- Harry C. Adams (1915–2011), head basketball coach at Kent State University, 1946–1948
- Harry Adams (photographer) (1918–1985), African-American photographer
- Harry Adams (sprinter) (born 1989), American sprinter

== See also ==
- Henry Adams (disambiguation)
- Harold Adams (disambiguation)
