= Leo Lemay =

American philosopher (1935–2008)

J. A. Leo Lemay (January 17, 1935 – October 15, 2008) was du Pont Winterthur Professor of English at the University of Delaware. He was most renowned for his lifelong fascination with Benjamin Franklin, although he wrote on many topics, including Edgar Allan Poe, Ebenezer Cooke, and Joel Barlow.

== Biography ==
Lemay was a 1953 graduate of Baltimore City College in Baltimore, Maryland. Lemay was also a graduate of the University of Maryland, where he earned his master's degree, and obtained his doctorate from the University of Pennsylvania. He died on October 15, 2008, at home, shortly after returning home from a hospital stay.

Lemay was selected by Library of America to edit two of its selections on Franklin. His edition of The Autobiography of Benjamin Franklin, co-edited with Paul Zall, is generally recognized as the most authoritative.

In the 1990s, he put up the first substantial web resource to share with Franklin scholars and biographers in "Benjamin Franklin: A Documentary History."

The Documentary History was preparation for arguably his greatest investigation, a projected seven-volume biography of Franklin. Two of the volumes were published in 2006, by the University of Pennsylvania Press, in time for Franklin's Tercentennial.

The American Historical Review (Feb. 2007) called his first two volumes, "a labor of love balanced by thoughtful criticism. There is nothing like it."

== Selected writings ==
The Life of Benjamin Franklin Vol 3, Soldier, Scientist, and Politician, 1748-1757 Copyright 2009 University of Pennsylvania Press ISBN 978-0-8122-4121-1
