= David Mikics =

American literary scholar

- Awards: Guggenheim Fellowship (2017)

Academic work
- Discipline: English literature
- Sub-discipline: 20th-century Jewish arts and culture
- Institutions: New College of Florida; University of Houston
- Main interests: Jewish arts and culture, Saul Bellow, Stanley Kubrick

David Mikics is a professor of English at the New College of Florida. He was the Moores Distinguished Professor in the Department of English and the Honors College, University of Houston.

His book on Stanley Kubrick in the Yale University Press Jewish Lives series was published in 2020. His book about Saul Bellow entitled Bellow’s People: How Saul Bellow Made Life Into Art (W. W. Norton & Company) was published in 2016. Mikics was a Guggenheim Fellow for 2017. He is a regular reviewer and columnist for Tablet magazine and the Jewish Review of Books, writing about 20th-century Jewish arts and culture. He lives with his wife and son in Brooklyn.

== Bibliography ==
- The Limits of Moralizing: Pathos and Subjectivity in Spenser and Milton, Bucknell University Press, 1994
- The Romance of Individualism in Emerson and Nietzsche, Ohio University Press, 2003
- A New Handbook of Literary Terms, Yale University Press, 2007
- Who Was Jacques Derrida?: An Intellectual Biography, Yale University Press, 2009
- The Art of the Sonnet (with Stephanie Burt), Belknap Press, 2011
- The Annotated Emerson (editor), Belknap Press, 2012
- Slow Reading in a Hurried Age, Belknap Press, 2013
- Bellow's People: How Saul Bellow Made Life Into Art, W. W. Norton & Company, 2016
- The American Canon by Harold Bloom (editor), Library of America, 2020
- Stanley Kubrick: American Filmmaker, Yale University Press, 2020
- The MAD Files: Writers and Cartoonists on the Magazine that Warped America’s Brain! (editor), Library of America, 2024
