= Susan Ware =

American scholar, writer and editor (born 1950)

- Born: August 22, 1950 (age 74)
- Education: A.B., Wellesley College, History 1972 Ph.D., Harvard University, History 1978
- Occupations: Historian; editor
- Years active: 1978–present
- Employer: Oxford University Press
- Known for: Women's history scholar
- Spouse: Donald R. Ware
- Website: http://www.susanware.net

Susan Ware (born August 22, 1950) is an American independent scholar, writer and editor who lives in Cambridge, Massachusetts, and Hopkinton, New Hampshire. The author of eight biographies, two edited collections, and co-editor of a textbook, Ware is a specialist on 20th-century women's political and cultural history, and the history of popular feminism.

== Life ==
Ware graduated from Wellesley College in 1972. She matriculated in the graduate program in history at Harvard University in the fall of 1972, completing her A.M in 1973. Ware completed the Ph.D. in 1978, writing a dissertation about feminists in the New Deal under the direction of Barbara Miller Solomon, a pioneering scholar in American women's history. A second mentor was political historian Frank Freidel.

Ware began her career in teaching as a lecturer at Harvard from 1973 to 1978, and in the years her following completion of the Ph.D., taught at Tufts University, the University of New Hampshire, and Harvard. In 1986, she was appointed as an assistant professor of history at New York University. Ware attained the rank of professor with tenure before she left NYU in 1995 to pursue a full-time career in writing, editing and speaking. Since 1995 she has taught at Harvard and at the Massachusetts Institute of Technology.

In 2014, upon the retirement of historian Nancy Cott, Ware was appointed as Senior Advisor to the Schlesinger Library at the Radcliffe Institute, Harvard University. Ware held this post until Jane Kamensky was appointed Carl and Lily Pforzheimer Foundation Director in May 2015.

In her early work as a political historian, Ware established herself as an authority on women in the federal government during the New Deal. Her revised dissertation, Beyond Suffrage: Women and the New Deal (Harvard University Press, 1981) was the first historical monograph to show the pivotal role played by feminist progressive reformers like Frances Perkins and Molly Dewson in implementing social welfare at the federal level. As Nancy F. Cott wrote in a review of Ware's book, perhaps its most vital contribution to the field of women's history was its emphasis on "historical generation" and its recognition that political women "relied on each other for mutual support, advice and patronage"—much as political men did. Ware's research on women has been influential across fields. Political scientist Jo Freeman rated Ware's follow-up volume, Partner and I: Molly Dewson, Feminism, and New Deal Politics, as "excellent". Ware showed how Dewson not only brought hundreds of women into the federal government, but also revolutionized presidential campaign practices to such an extent that presidential advisor James Farley referred to her as "the General".

Since becoming an independent scholar, Ware has published and edited numerous books. In 2001, she became the general editor of Notable American Women, a multi-volume reference work that documents the history of women in the United States, Under Ware's direction, Harvard University Press published Volume 5 of this crucial biographical resource in 2004. Since 2012, Ware has been the general editor of American National Biography Online, published by Oxford University Press.

Ware serves as Chair of the Associate Board of Clio Visualizing History, a nonprofit group dedicated to creating innovative online history exhibits designed to attract students and educators and appeal to a wide public audience. She was part of the collaborative team that created and she wrote the text for Click! The Ongoing Feminist Revolution and a companion exhibit to her book Why They Marched: Untold Stories of the Women Who Fought for the Right to Vote (Harvard, 2019) was published as Visualizing Votes for Women: Nineteen Objects from the 19th Amendment Campaign.

Ware is married to Donald R. Ware, head of the Intellectual Property Department at Foley Hoag LLP in Boston.

== Books ==
- Ware, Susan (1981). Beyond Suffrage: Women in the New Deal. Cambridge: Harvard University Press. ISBN 978-0674069220.
- Ware, Susan (1989). Partner and I: Molly Dewson, Feminism, and New Deal Politics. New Haven: Yale University Press. ISBN 978-0300046212.
- Ware, Susan (2005). It's One O'Clock and Here Is Mary Margaret McBride: A Radio Biography. New York: New York University Press. ISBN 978-0814794012.
- Ware, Susan (2011). Game, Set, Match: Billie Jean King and the Revolution in Women's Sports. Chapel Hill: The University of North Carolina Press. ISBN 978-1469622033.
- Ware, Susan (2014). Title IX: A Brief History with Documents. Waveland Press, Inc. ISBN 978-1478618812.
- Ware, Susan (2018). Why They Marched: Untold Stories of the Women Who Fought for the Right to Vote. Cambridge: Harvard University Press. ISBN 9780674986688.
