= Laurence Maslon =

American music writer and historian

Laurence Maslon (born 1959) is an American music writer and historian, best known for his publications Broadway: The American Musical (2004), Make 'Em Laugh: The Funny Business of America (2008), and Broadway to Main Street: How Show Tunes Enchanted America (2018) about the Broadway theatre and its musical history. He also coproduced the documentary Sammy Davis Jr.: I’ve Gotta Be Me (2017). He is also an arts professor at New York University's Tisch School of the Arts.
