= Nancy F. Cott =

American historian (born 1945)

- Born: Nancy Falik; November 8, 1945 (age 80); Philadelphia, Pennsylvania, U.S.
- Other names: Nancy Falik Cott
- Occupation: Historian
- Known for: Support of same-sex marriage

Nancy Falik Cott (born November 8, 1945) is an American historian and professor who has taught at Yale and Harvard universities, specializing in gender topics in the United States in the 19th and 20th centuries. She has testified on same-sex marriage in several US states.

== Early life and education ==
Cott was born in Philadelphia, Pennsylvania, on November 8, 1945. Her father was a textile manufacturer and her family origins are Austro-Hungarian Jewish. She attended public schools in Cheltenham Township, Pennsylvania and then Cornell University, where she graduated with a bachelor's degree in 1967. She then attended Brandeis University, where she obtained a master's degree in American civilization in 1969. She married Leland D. Cott in 1969. They have two children, born in 1974 and 1979. She obtained her doctorate in American civilization from Brandeis in 1974.

== Career ==
Cott became a lecturer at Boston Public Library, then in 1975 was appointed to teach history and American studies at Yale University. Cott was assistant professor 1975–79, associate professor 1979–86 and professor 1986–90. She obtained research fellowships from the Rockefeller Foundation and Guggenheim Foundation and from the National Endowment for the Humanities. Cott was one of the founders of the Women's Studies program at Yale. She chaired the American Studies Program at Yale in the mid-1990s, and then directed the Division of the Humanities. In 1990 she was appointed Stanley Woodward Professor of History and American Studies.

Cott was named Sterling Professor of History and American Studies in 2001 at Yale University. At the invitation of Drew Gilpin Faust of the Radcliffe Institute for Advanced Study she accepted a position as Carl and Lily Pforzheimer Foundation Director of the Schlesinger Library in 2001. She had a long association with the library, having used it to research her first book, Root of Bitterness: Documents of the Social History of American Women (1972). Cott was elected a member of the American Academy of Arts and Sciences in 2008. She left the Schlesinger Library in June 2014. As of 2014 Cott was Jonathan Trumbull Professor of American History at Harvard University. She was teaching undergraduate courses on the history of sexuality and gender, and graduate-level courses on the history of the US in the 20th century. In 2014 she was also president-elect of the Organization of American Historians.

== Same-sex marriage ==
Cott has helped write amicus curiae briefs on same-sex marriage in several states since 1999. These have included challenges to the federal Defense of Marriage Act. Cott testified as an expert witness in the case of Perry v. Schwarzenegger in California. Cott has pointed out that the Christian tradition of monogamous marriage only dates back to the time of Christ, and was not strongly enforced by Catholic ecclesiastical law until 1400 or 1500. Protestants, including the founders of the US, have historically seen marriage as a civil concern, mainly concerning child support. Views on marriage continue to change, with higher divorce rates, different views on the role of marriage and the legalization of interracial marriage.

Cott says she has come to favor same-sex marriages, "as a result of my historical research and study." In her view, "if gender symmetry and equality and the couples' own definition of spousal roles are characteristic of marriage, then same-sex couples seem perfectly able to fulfill those roles." When testifying in January 2010 in the challenge to California Proposition 8 (2008), which banned same sex marriage, she was asked to comment on the defense assertion that "the purpose of the institution of marriage, the central purpose, is to promote procreation and to channel naturally procreative sexual activity between men and women into stable and enduring unions." She responded that, "It rather reminded me of the story about the seven blind men and the elephant, in that each of them is feeling the animal at some side of it; and the one that feels the trunk says, oh, this animal is just like a snake."

== Publications ==
Publications include:

- Cott, Nancy F. (Winter 1978). "Passionlessness: An Interpretation of Victorian Sexual Ideology, 1790–1850". Signs. 4 (2). The University of Chicago Press: 219–236. doi:10.1086/493603. JSTOR 3173022. PMID 21213646. S2CID 145275606.
- Cott, Nancy F. (1972). Root of Bitterness: Documents of the Social History of American Women.ed.and with an Introd.by N.F.cott. E. P. Dutton.
- Cott, Nancy F. (Autumn 1976). "Eighteenth-century Family and Social Life Revealed in Massachusetts Divorce Records". Journal of Social History. 10 (1). Oxford University Press: 20–43. doi:10.1353/jsh/10.1.20. JSTOR 3786419.
- Cott, Nancy F. (1977). The Bonds of Womanhood: "Woman's Sphere" in New England, 1780–1835. Yale University Press. ISBN 978-0-300-07298-3.
- Cott, Nancy F.; Pleck, E.H., eds. (1980). A Heritage of Her Own: Towards a New Social History of American Women. Touchstone.
- Cott, Nancy F. (1987). The Grounding of Modern Feminism. Yale University Press. ISBN 978-0-300-04228-3.
- Mitchell, Juliet; Cott, Nancy F. (1989). What is Feminism?. Basil Blackwell.
- Cott, Nancy F. (1991). A Woman Making History: Mary Ritter Beard through Her Letters.
- Cott, Nancy F. (1995). The Young Oxford History of Women in the United States: The limits of independence. Oxford University Press. ISBN 978-0-19-508829-8.
- Deutsch, Sarah Jane (1998). Cott, Nancy F. (ed.). From Ballots to Breadlines: American Women 1920–1940. Topeka Bindery. ISBN 0613078284.
- Cott, Nancy F. (2000). Public Vows: A History of Marriage and the Nation. Harvard University Press. ISBN 978-0-674-02988-0.
- Cott, Nancy F. (2000). No Small Courage: A History of Women in the United States. Oxford University Press. ISBN 978-1-4223-5254-0.
- Harness, Cheryl; Cott, Nancy F. (2001). Remember the Ladies: 100 Great American Women. Collins. ISBN 0688170188.
- Cott, Nancy F. (2006). Love, Barbara J. (ed.). Feminists Who Changed America, 1963–1975. (Introduction). University of Illinois Press. ISBN 025203189X.
- Cott, Nancy F. (January 1, 2011). "No Objections: What history tells us about remaking marriage". Boston Review.
- Cott, Nancy F. (February 2013). "Revisiting the Transatlantic 1920s: Vincent Sheean vs. Malcolm Cowley". American Historical Review. 118: 46–75. doi:10.1093/ahr/118.1.46.
