= Henry Adams (cricketer) =

English cricketer

Personal information
- Full name: Henry James Adams
- Born: 25 April 1852; Croydon, Surrey, England
- Died: 21 February 1922 (aged 70); Edmonton, Middlesex, England
- Batting: Right-handed
- Bowling: Right-arm medium
- Role: Wicket-keeper

Domestic team information
- Years: Team
- 1887–1889: Surrey

Career statistics
Competition	First-class
Matches	5
Runs scored	25
Batting average	5.00
100s/50s	–/–
Top score	9
Balls bowled	–
Wickets	–
Bowling average	–
5 wickets in innings	–
10 wickets in match	–
Best bowling	–
Catches/stumpings	4/2
- Source: , 11 June 2012

Henry James Adams (25 April 1852 – 21 February 1922) was an English first-class cricketer. Adams' was a right-handed batsman who fielded as a wicket-keeper and who could also bowl right-arm medium pace. He was born at Croydon, Surrey.

Adams made his first-class debut for Surrey against Sussex in 1887. He made three further first-class appearances for the county, the last of which came against Cambridge University in 1889. In his five first-class matches for Surrey, he scored 25 runs at an average of 8.33, with a high score of 9. Behind the stumps he took 4 catches and made 2 stumpings. He also made a single first-class appearance for CI Thornton's XI against the touring Australians in 1888. He was dismissed for a duck twice in the match, both times by J. J. Ferris.

He died at Edmonton, Middlesex on 21 February 1922.
