= Elizabeth Samet =

Author

Elizabeth Dale Samet (born August 14, 1969) is an author of numerous books, essays, and reviews on United States military history.

== Biography ==
Samet has been a Professor of English at West Point since 1997, an experience that has significantly shaped her work. Samet earned her Ph.D. in English literature from Yale and her B.A. from Harvard University. She is the recipient of multiple awards and honors for her work.

Samet's autobiographical book Soldier's Heart: Reading Literature Through Peace and War at West Point describes her experience teaching literature at the United States Military Academy, or West Point, to soldiers preparing to fight a war. In an interview with Dallas News, Samet noted that her interest in Ulysses S. Grant was what originally piqued her interest in teaching at West Point, as the military commander and president was a West Point alumnus. Her work explores the soldier's experience and the heartbreaking difficulties of losing her former students to war. She also seeks to make a connection between the civilian experience and that of those in the military.

She frequently writes for The New Republic and Bloomberg's publications.

== Works ==
=== Books ===
- Samet, Elizabeth D. (2021). Looking for the Good War: American Amnesia and the Violent Pursuit of Happiness. New York: Farrar, Straus and Giroux. ISBN 9780374219925. OCLC 1227087002.
- Samet, Elizabeth D., ed. (2018). The Annotated Memoirs of Ulysses S. Grant. National Geographic Books. ISBN 9781631492440
- Samet, Elizabeth D. (2015). Leadership: Essential Writings by Our Greatest Thinkers: a Norton Anthology. New York: W. W. Norton & Company. ISBN 9780393239690. OCLC 902854149.
- Samet, Elizabeth D. (2014). No Man's Land: Preparing for War and Peace in Post-9/11 America. New York: Farrar, Straus and Giroux. ISBN 0374222770. OCLC 869263697.
- Samet, Elizabeth D. (2007). Soldier's Heart: Reading Literature Through Peace and War at West Point. New York: Farrar, Straus and Giroux. ISBN 0374180636. OCLC 85830737.
- Samet, Elizabeth D. (2004). Willing Obedience: Citizens, Soldiers, and the Progress of Consent in America, 1776-1898. Stanford: Stanford University Press. ISBN 0804747253. OCLC 53215712.

=== Other works ===
- McDonald, Robert M. S., ed. (2004). Thomas Jefferson's Military Academy: Founding West Point. Charlottesville: University of Virginia Press. ISBN 0813922984. OCLC 55016997.
- McPeak, Rick; Orwin, Donna Tussing (2012). Tolstoy on War: Narrative Art and Historical Truth in "War and Peace". Ithaca: Cornell University Press. ISBN 0801448980. OCLC 786161792.
- Samet, Elizabeth (July 6, 2011). "Happy Birthday, 'Catch-22': Reading the Novel in a Time of War". The New Republic.
- Samet, Elizabeth (March 25, 2013). "Bureaucratic Warriors: Is Foreign Policy Any Different When It's Crafted by Veterans?". The New Republic.

== Awards ==
- 2012 Hiett Prize in the Humanities
- 2012 Guggenheim Memorial Foundation Fellow
