= Kenneth Offit =

American geneticist (born 1955)

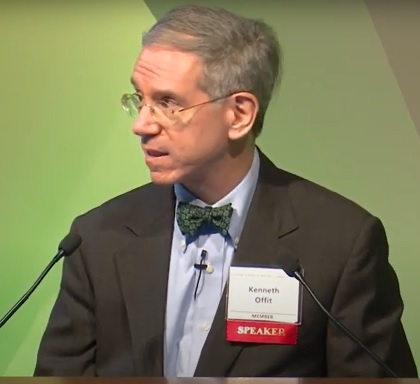
- Offit in 2018
- Born: February 19, 1955 (age 71); New York, New York, United States
- Education: Princeton University (BA); Harvard Medical School (MD); Harvard School of Public Health (MPH)
- Known for: Clinical oncogenomics BRCA2 founder mutation research
- Spouse: Emily Sonnenblick (m. 1984)
- Awards: Ellis Island Medal of Honor (2023); Basser Global Prize (2023)
- Scientific career
- Fields: Oncogenomics
- Workplaces: Memorial Sloan Kettering Cancer Center

Kenneth Offit (born February 19, 1955) is an American cancer geneticist and oncologist known for his discoveries with respect to the genetic bases of breast, colorectal, and lymphoid cancers. He is currently Chief of the Clinical Genetics Service and the Robert and Kate Niehaus Chair in Inherited Cancer Genomics at Memorial Sloan Kettering Cancer Center. Offit is also a member of the Program in Cancer Biology and Genetics at the Sloan-Kettering Institute and a Professor of Medicine and Healthcare Policy and Research at Weill Cornell Medical College. He was previously a member of both the Board of Scientific Counselors of the National Cancer Institute and the Evaluation of Genomic Applications in Practice and Prevention working group of the U.S. Centers for Disease Control.

Offit has garnered numerous honors for his contributions to the prevention and management of cancer. In 2013, he was selected for the American Society of Clinical Oncology-American Cancer Society Award and Lecture. In 2016, he was elected as a Member of the National Academy of Medicine and appointed to the Roundtable on Genomics and Precision Health. In 2018, he was named a Fellow of the American Society of Clinical Oncology. In 2021, he was elected a Fellow of the American Association for the Advancement of Science. In 2023, he was awarded the University of Pennsylvania's Basser Global Prize for BRCA1 and BRCA2-related research and an Ellis Island Medal of Honor for his national professional and civic contributions. In 2025, Offit was elected as a member of the American Academy of Arts and Sciences.

== Early life and education ==
Offit was born in New York City on February 19, 1955, to Dr. Avodah K. Offit (née Komito), a psychiatrist, and Sidney Offit, an author. Offit attended the Browning School and then Princeton University, where he was chairman of the campus humor magazine, Tiger Magazine. He would later recall that he had been drawn to astronomy and astrophysics but was nudged toward medicine by his mother.

Offit graduated magna cum laude in 1977 and joined the University Board of Trustees as a young alumni trustee. In this capacity, he worked closely with President William G. Bowen on issues pertaining to Princeton's residential system. In 1979, Offit voted to endorse the proposals of the Committee on Undergraduate Residential Life (CURL) that would become the basis for Princeton's current residential college system. Offit and other trustees would further propose that residential colleges be expanded to include upperclassmen who had not joined a selective eating club—a reform that, with some modification, would be adopted decades later.

After finishing his undergraduate degree, Offit completed an M.D. at Harvard Medical School and an M.P.H. at the Harvard School of Public Health. In the early 1980s, he worked for Environmental Protection Agency and Health Effects Institute on research that examined the relationship between air quality and lung cancer.

He returned to New York for a residency in internal medicine at the Lenox Hill Hospital. Upon finishing the residency in 1985, he moved to Memorial Sloan Kettering Cancer Center for a three-year fellowship in hematology and oncology.

== Career and research ==
Offit joined the faculty at Memorial Sloan Kettering Cancer Center upon the completion of his fellowship in 1988. His early work involved molecular cytogenetic studies of non-Hodgkin's lymphoma.

In 1992, Offit founded one of the world's first clinical cancer genetics services. In 1996, after the discovery of the BRCA2 gene, he and his research group successfully identified the most common mutation on the gene associated with breast and ovarian cancer among individuals of Ashkenazi Jewish ancestry. Offit would also lead the first American Society of Clinical Oncology policy statement following the identification of BRCA1 and BRCA2. In 1997, he wrote Clinical Cancer Genetics: Risk Counseling and Management, which received an award in Medical Sciences from the Association of American Publishers.

In 2002, Offit and his clinical team published the first prospective study establishing the role of risk-reducing ovarian surgery in women carrying BRCA1 and BRCA2 mutations. They would go on to discover or describe recurrent mutations causing increased risk for colon and prostate cancer, and, in 2013 and 2015, they described two genetic syndromes of inherited childhood lymphoblastic leukemia.

In 2018, Offit joined Beth Karlan, Judy Garber, Susan Domchek, and other physicians to launch the BRCA Founder Outreach Study (BFOR). BFOR provided free testing for three mutations for all insured people over the age of 25 with at least one grandparent of Ashkenazi heritage. Offit called BFOR "a model for the future of genetic testing in health care"—one that would, in contrast to direct-to-consumer genetics testing, allow participants to receive results from their primary care provider.

== Personal life ==
In 1984, Offit married Emily Sonnenblick. Sonnenblick is a radiologist at Mount Sinai Hospital and the daughter of cardiologist Edmund Sonnenblick. One of their daughters, Anna Offit, is a professor of law at William & Mary Law School.
