= Sidney Offit =

American writer (1928–2026)

- Born: October 13, 1928; Baltimore, Maryland, U.S.
- Died: October 3, 2026 (aged 97); New York City, U.S.
- Education: Johns Hopkins University (B.A., English Literature, 1950)
- Occupations: Writer, academic
- Spouse: Avodah Komito
- Children: Kenneth; Michael
- Writing career
- Genres: Children's books, memoir, young adult literature

Sidney Offit (October 13, 1928 – October 3, 2026) was an American writer best known for his contributions to civic and literary life in New York City. Offit, who found a broad readership with his children's books, served at different times as President of the Authors Guild Foundation, President of the Century Association, board member of PEN American Center, and curator of the George Polk Awards in Journalism. After his death in 2026, he was remembered by Pulitzer Prize-winning writer Robert Caro as “the central figure in the world of writers in New York for 40 years.”

As a fixture of the New York literary scene during the latter half of the 20th century, Offit befriended many of the era's most-celebrated writers, including Ralph Ellison, Joseph Heller and Kurt Vonnegut. Vonnegut regarded Offit as his best friend and included him at the "clambake" in his semi-autobiographical novel Timequake. After Vonnegut's death, Offit reminisced about their close friendship in various fora, and edited the Library of America's collection of the late author's novels and short stories. He also provided the foreword to Look at the Birdie, a volume of fourteen previously unpublished short stories by Vonnegut.

Offit himself wrote two novels, ten books for younger readers, and two memoirs. He was also a celebrated writing teacher at The New School, New York University and Hunter College, whose students included Marita Golden, Ann Jones, and Barry Beckham.

== Early life and education ==
Offit was born in Baltimore, Maryland, on October 13, 1928, to Lilian (née Cohen) and Barney Offit. His family was Jewish, and his father Barney was a second-generation immigrant whose family had come to the United States from the Russian Empire. Barney made a living as a bookmaker.

He attended Valley Forge Military Academy and College, graduating in 1946. He matriculated at Johns Hopkins University, where he was recruited to write for The Johns Hopkins News-Letter by its managing editor, Russell Baker. Offit would himself become the paper's managing editor before graduating in 1950 with a B.A. in English Literature.

== Career ==
Offit moved to New York City and began his literary career in the early 1950s as an editorial assistant at Mercury Publications and McFadden Publishers. In 1955, he became a contributing editor at Baseball Magazine, and the following year assembled The Best of Baseball, a collection of some of the publication's most celebrated stories from previous decades. During his summers he worked at the Aladdin, the hotel owned by his in-laws in the Catskills. His experiences there formed the basis of his 1959 debut novel, He Had It Made. Offit landed an appearance on Tonight Starring Jack Paar to promote the book.

Though Offit produced one more novel, 1962's The Other Side of the Street, he soon found greater success as a writer of children's books, which he published at a prodigious rate through the end of the decade. His stories covered topics ranging from sports to Greek mythology, and featured artwork by illustrators like Peter Burchard (Cadet Attack), Paul Galdone (The Adventures of Homer Fink), and Mercer Mayer (The Boy Who Made a Million). In 1971, Boys' Life wrote that "more than a few of BL's millions of readers must be among the millions who know Mr. Offit's books for young readers: The Adventures of Homer Fink, Soupbone, Cadet Attack, and Cadet Quarterback." During this same period Offit began teaching fiction writing at both New York University and The New School. In 1972, he was appointed curator of the annual George Polk Awards in Journalism at Long Island University.

== The Abend-Offit Debates ==
In 1975, Offit began appearing with television commentator Martin Abend for a nightly op-ed debate on the 10pm WNEW-TV (now WNYW) newscast. "Professor Offit" represented the liberal viewpoint against the arch-conservative Abend in heated back-and-forths about social, economic, and political issues. Years later, television critic Marvin Kitman remembered:

Offit was the liberal, the last of a long line Abend debated on 'The Ten O'Clock News.' Before him there was Ted Sorenson, Ramsey Clark, Ed Koch, Victor Riesel and even Dr. Joyce Brothers (briefly). 'It was like feeding raw meat to the lions,' a news executive said of the practice of engaging fresh partners for Abend. Offit stuck in Abend's throat. He lasted for 10 years and 1,000 debates.

The Abend-Offit debates often degenerated into outrageous ad hominem attacks, and were said to have inspired the CNN show "Crossfire" and Saturday Night Live's "Point/Counterpoint" sketch featuring Jane Curtin and Dan Aykroyd. The debates were a regular feature of the 10pm news until 1985. They were briefly revived on Channel 11 in New York in 1992.

== Later career ==
In the mid-1980s, Offit joined the board of PEN American Center, working with then-president Norman Mailer.

Following the 1977 publication of a young adult novel, What Kind of Guy Do You Think I Am?, Offit took an almost twenty-year hiatus from long-form writing. He returned in 1995, however, with Memoir of the Bookie's Son, an extended reflection on his relationship with his father, a notorious Great Depression-era Baltimore bookie. The memoir was a bestseller and proclaimed "recommended reading" by The New Yorker. A second memoir, Friends, Writers and Other Countrymen: A Memoir, describes his encounters with figures like H. L. Mencken, Robert Frost, Che Guevara, and Truman Capote.

In 1999, Offit was awarded an honorary degree from Long Island University – Brooklyn. In 2009, after 32 years, he retired as curator of the George Polk Awards in Journalism and was succeeded by John Darnton.

As a presence in New York's literary scene since the 1950s, Offit befriended and collaborated with many of the city's most storied writers. In recent decades, he has regularly been interviewed by historians and biographers, and his reminiscences have been featured in works on Kurt Vonnegut, Ralph Ellison, and Madeline L'Engle.

== Personal life and death ==
In the early 1950s, Offit married Avodah Komito, the daughter of Abraham Komito, civil engineer, and Carrie Komito (née Fortgang), the proprietor of the Aladdin, a Borscht Belt hotel in Woodbourne, New York, and the developer of several Manhattan apartment buildings. Together, the couple had two sons, Kenneth Offit, an oncologist, and Michael Offit, a Wall Street trader and author.

Offit died in New York City on October 3, 2026, at the age of 97.

== Bibliography ==
- (1959) He Had It Made
- (1960) The Boy who Won the World Series
- (1962) The Other Side of the Street
- (1962) Cadet Command
- (1963) Soupbone
- (1964) Cadet Attack
- (1965) Topsy Turvy
- (1966) The Adventures of Homer Fink
- (1968) The Boy Who Made a Million
- (1969) Cadet Quarterback
- (1971) Not All Girls Have Million Dollar Smiles
- (1972) Only a Girl Like You
- (1977) What Kind of Guy Do You Think I Am?
- (1995) Memoir of the Bookie's Son
- (2008) Friends, Writers, and Other Countrymen: A Memoir
