= Memoirs of General W.T. Sherman =

1875 autobiography by William Sherman

Original cover of the Memoirs of General W.T. Sherman published in 1875.

The Memoirs of General W.T. Sherman are an autobiography, in two volumes, of William Tecumseh Sherman. The book focuses on Sherman's early life growing up in Lancaster, Ohio, his military and professional career after graduating from the United States Military Academy in 1840, and his experience as a leading general in the United States Army during the American Civil War. At the urging of his close friends, and a desire to shape his own legacy, Sherman began writing his memoirs in the early 1870s. The set was officially published in May 1875 by D. Appleton & Company.

== Background ==
=== Defining Sherman’s historical reputation ===
Immediately following the conclusion of the American Civil War, Sherman's reputation as a general was viewed favorably by northerner historians and negatively by southerner Lost Cause historians. He was mostly criticized for his actions during the Atlanta campaign, the March to the Sea, and the Carolinas campaign. Prominent southern historian Edward A. Pollard wrote, "The man who is now known in Northern newspapers as a hero of the war and luminary of the military age will scarcely be known in future and just history, further than as the man who depopulated and destroyed Atlanta, essayed a new code of cruelty in war, marched so many miles, achieved much bad notoriety, and ended with a professional fame mediocre and insignificant, holding a place no longer conspicuous in the permanent records of the times." In 1865, northern historian, and civil war veteran, Samuel M. Bowman published Sherman and his Campaigns: A Military Biography. Bowman, a close friend of Sherman's, wrote, "The country...and the world will probably agree in according him military genius of a high order. Indeed, this judgement can hardly be withheld without obliterating the most brilliant achievements of the war, still fresh in the memory of all."

Sherman was aware of the criticism he faced from historians. In an address to the Society of the Army of the Tennessee in November 1867, Sherman crowed about his armies' victories during the war, and asserted, "How any Southern gentleman, with these facts, plain and palpable everywhere, staring him in the face, and recorded forever in the book of history, can still boast of his 'lost cause,' or speak of it in language other than that of shame and sorrow, passes my understanding..."

=== Composition ===
Inspired by a desire to challenge the record established by his detractors, Sherman began writing his memoirs in the early 1870s. In a letter to a friend, he wrote, "We the victors must stamp on all history that we were right and they wrong- that we beat them in Battle as well as in argument, and that we must give direction to future events." By 1874 Sherman had written a substantial portion of his autobiography. In mid-August 1874, Sherman sent an early version of his writings to English scholar John W. Draper. Sherman stated he had "written something not for publication but for his children and to help someone writing a history of the war." Draper was impressed by Sherman’s narrative style and encouraged him to publish the manuscript.

=== D. Appleton & Company publishing deal ===
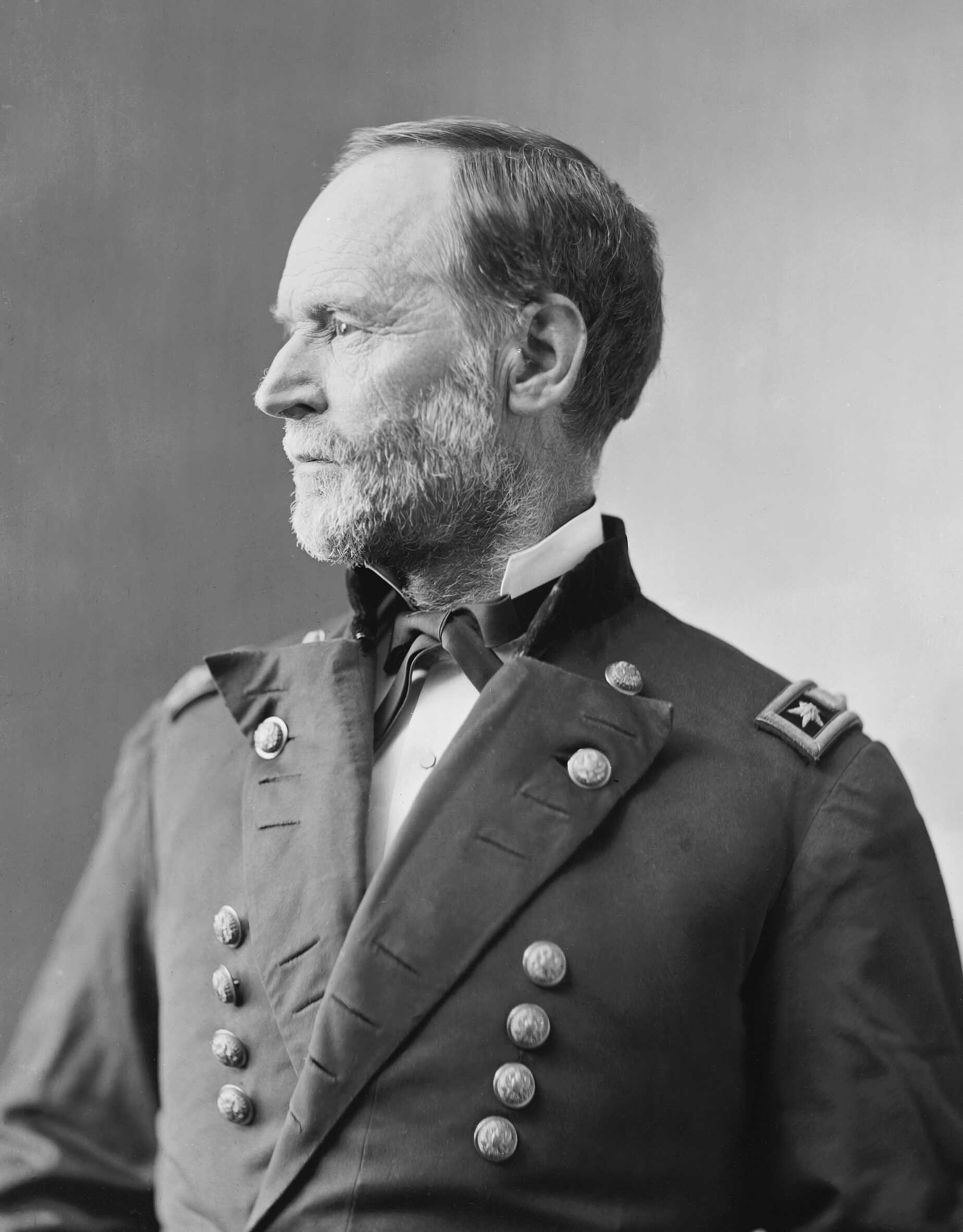
William Tecumseh Sherman pictured sometime between 1865-1870

Over the next few months, while living in St. Louis, Missouri, Sherman negotiated with multiple publishing companies to publish his memoirs. Finally, on January 21, 1875, Sherman signed a three-year contract with D. Appleton & Company. According to the contract, his memoirs would be published in two volumes with an average of four hundred pages per volume and would cover the years from 1846 to 1865. Sherman also agreed to pay the cost of the printing plates, which came out to $2,165.36, which meant he "absolutely owned the work." In a letter to his brother-in-law, Sherman lamented, "I have just done a thing that I may regret all my life, committed to the Appleton's of New York the manuscript of two volumes mostly on the Civil War that may bring me some profit but more controversy."

In May 1875, The Memoirs of General W.T. Sherman were officially published. The first printing was bound in blue cloth with the title in gold lettering on the cover. The two-volume set originally sold for $5.50, with Sherman earning $.40 per volume sold.

In letters to close friends and family, Sherman was open about his intention behind publishing his autobiography. He wrote to his brother, "In my book I have taken great pains to avoid objects of controversy, but have explained causes and reason, so that the Real Historian will find less trouble to account for actual events."

== Structure ==
The first edition of the Memoirs is divided into two volumes. The volumes contained twenty-four chapters and 814 pages. Sherman provided his motivation for writing his memoirs in the preface:

What is now offered is not designed as a history of the war, or even as a complete account of all the incidents in which the writer bore a part, but merely his recollection of events, corrected by a reference to his own memoranda, which may assist the future historian when he comes to describe the whole, and account for the motives and reasons which influenced some of the actors in the grand drama of war.

The first seven chapters cover Sherman’s life from 1846 to 1861, including his military experience in California during the Mexican-American War, his time as a banker in San Francisco during the Gold Rush, and his tenure as president of the Louisiana State Seminary of Learning and Military Academy. The remaining chapters cover his experience as a general in the American Civil War. Sherman’s writing style is meandering, and the narrative is interrupted with the occasional post-battle report and battlefield correspondence, but overall, Sherman’s storytelling and narrative technique is engaging and reveals his intentions and character.

According to historian John F. Marszalek, the books tone “is that of Sherman telling his story around a camp fire, forthrightly presenting his view of the nation’s great domestic crisis to friends and admirers, comrades and family, former enemies and current critics.

His opinionate and unapologetic demeanor is on full display in his story about having dinner with the Governor Thomas O. Moore of Louisiana and other prominent Southern political leaders in the months before the Civil War. When asked about his views on slavery, Sherman responded:

The people of Louisiana were hardly responsible for slavery, as they had inherited it; that I found two distinct conditions of slavery, domestic and field hands. The domestic slaves, employed by the families, were prob ably better treated than any slaves on earth; but the condition of the field- hands was different, depending more on the temper and disposition of their masters and overseers than were those employed about the house… Were I a citizen of Louisiana, and a member of the Legislature, I would deem it wise to bring the legal condition of the slaves more near the status of human beings under all Christian and civilized governments. In the first place, I argued that, in sales of slaves made by the State, I would forbid the separation of families, letting the father, mother, and children, be sold together to one person, instead of each to the highest bidder. And, again, I would advise the repeal of the statute which enacted a severe penalty for even the owner to teach his slave to read and write, because that actually qualified property and took away a part of its value; illustrating the assertion by the case of Henry Sampson, who had been the slave of Colonel Chambers, of Rapides Parish, who had gone to California as the servant of an officer of the army, and who was afterward employed by me in the bank at San Francisco. At first he could not write or read, and I could only afford to pay him one hundred dollars a month; but he was taught to read and write by Reilley, our bank-teller, when his services became worth two hundred and fifty dollars a month, which enabled him to buy his own freedom and that of his brother and his family.

Another example of Sherman's unapologetic nature can be found in his justification of expelling all the citizens of Atlanta from the city after he captured it in September 1864:

I peremptorily required that all the citizens and families resident in Atlanta should go away, giving to each the option to go south or north, as their interests or feelings dictated. I was resolved to make Atlanta a pure military garrison or depot, with no civil population to influence military measures. I had seen Memphis, Vicksburg, Natchez, and New Orleans, all captured from the enemy, and each at once was garrisoned by a full division of troops, if not more; so that success was actually crippling our armies in the field by detachments to guard and protect the interests of a hostile population.

I gave notice of this purpose, as early as the 4th of September, to General Halleck, in a letter concluding with these words: If the people raise a howl against my barbarity and cruelty, I will answer that war is war, and not popularity-seeking. If they want peace, they and their relatives must stop the war.

I knew, of course, that such a measure would be strongly criticised, but made up my mind to do it with the absolute certainty of its justness, and that time would sanction its wisdom. I knew that the people of the South would read in this measure two important conclusions: one, that we were in earnest; and the other, if they were sincere in their common and popular clamor 'to die in the last ditch,' that the opportunity would soon come.

== Legacy ==
Almost immediately after its publication, Sherman’s Memoirs were well received by the general reader and people interested in learning more about the Civil War. However, Sherman faced criticism from some of his fellow U.S. Army soldiers. One veteran in particular, Henry V. Boynton, wrote a book critical of Sherman’s Memoirs entitled Sherman's Historical Raid: The Memoirs in the Light of the Record. The book’s binding mirrored the blue and gold color scheme of Sherman's Memoirs because Boynton believed it should be on the shelves right next to Sherman’s two volumes. In the preface, Boynton stated, "This book is a criticism upon Sherman as a general, only so far as the official records presented furnish such criticism." In an 1880 interview with the Cleveland Leader, Sherman said of Boynton, "You could hire him to do anything for money. Why, for a thousand dollars he would slander his own mother." Boynton confronted Sherman about his comment in a letter. In response, Sherman asserted, "This is a hard thing to say of any man, but I believe it of you."

Simultaneously, Sherman's closest friends published their own works to counter Boynton's narrative. Sherman's brother-in-law, Charles W. Moulton published The Review of General Sherman’s Memoirs Examined, Chiefly in the Light of Its Own Evidence. In July 1875, Union general and future President of the United States, James A. Garfield, wrote to Sherman to praise him for his writings. Garfield was pleased with "the fresh and vivid style [and] the graphic description of persons and events." He added, "I do not believe that a just criticism will charge you with doing any intentional injustice to anyone."

In January 1876, then sitting President of the United States, Ulysses S. Grant, finally provided Sherman with his assessment of the Memoirs. He stated, "I will repeat that I do not believe a more correct history can be given of the events recorded by you in the 'Memoirs,'" Grant was influenced by Sherman's writing style and narrative technique when he wrote his own memoirs about ten years later.

In 1876, Prussian military captain A. von Clausewitz published a translated version of the Atlanta campaign chapter in a German military journal as “Ein Eisenbahnkrieg im Amerikanischen Sezessions-Krieg,” which roughly translates to “A Railroad War in the American Civil War."

=== Second edition ===
After nearly a decade of reviews and criticisms, Sherman decided it was time to publish a revised, second edition of his memoirs. The second edition contained a new preface, a new first chapter which focused on his life before 1846, and a new final chapter which touched on his post-Civil War life. Sherman also included two appendices containing numerous letters and other excerpts that were both complimentary and critical of the first edition. These documents provided the reader with the reasons why Sherman made changes to the text between the first and second editions. In total, Sherman made approximately fifty changes to the transcription of the first edition. Most of the changes were mundane, except for his criticism of General Joseph Hooker, which he softened in the second edition.

Subsequent editions of Sherman’s Memoirs were published with biographical sections added by others, but the second edition was the final edition that Sherman edited himself.

=== Modern annotated editions ===
On September 23, 2025, the first completely annotated edition of the memoirs was published by The Belknap Press of Harvard University Press. Titled The Memoirs of General William Tecumseh Sherman: The Complete Annotated Edition, it was edited by John F. Marszalek (Executive Director of the Ulysses S. Grant Association from 2008 to 2022), with Louie P. Gallo (Managing Editor of the Ulysses S. Grant Presidential Library) and David S. Nolen (Associate Dean of Archives and Special Collections at Mississippi State University). They completed the project as a follow-up to their 2017 work The Personal Memoirs of Ulysses S. Grant: The Complete Annotated Edition, also published by The Belknap Press of Harvard University Press.

== See also ==
- Bibliography of the American Civil War
