= Offutt (surname) =

Offutt is a surname. Notable people with the surname include:

- Andrew J. Offutt (1934–2013), American science-fiction and fantasy author
- Chris Offutt (born 1958), American author of fiction and memoirs
- Denton Offutt, 19th century American general store operator who gave Abraham Lincoln his first job
- Jarvis Offutt (1894–1918), American World War I aviator
- Jeff Offutt (born 1961), American university professor of software engineering
- T. Scott Offutt (1872–1943), justice of the Maryland Court of Appeals
- Warren B. Offutt (1928–2017), American astronomer

== See also ==
- Offit, a surname
