= Henry Adams (activist) =

American civil rights activist

Henry Adams (1843–?) was a formerly enslaved man who led what has been considered Louisiana's first civil rights campaign, which promoted voting rights for former slaves and advocated for African Americans to migrate from the South.

== Biography ==
Adams was born into slavery as Henry Houston in Newton County, Georgia, on March 16, 1843. In 1850, Adams' owner moved his plantation to DeSoto Parish, Louisiana. Adams and his family were freed by their owner on May 26, 1865, when Shreveport, Louisiana, surrendered to Union forces. After the Civil War ended, Adams worked as a drayman in Shreveport and also served in the army from 1866–1869.

In 1870, Adams organized a group of African American veterans from Shreveport, calling the group the Committee, with about 150 men travelling across the South to encourage African Americans to vote. In 1874, Adams' organization became part of the Colonization Council, a secret fraternal society. The council's objectives were to improve conditions for African Americans in the South; failing that, to petition the President of the United States for genuine protection of African Americans; then, to request land to establish an African American majority state; and finally, as a last resort, to have African Americans leave the United States. Realizing that conditions in the South would not improve, Adams advocated for migration from the South, first publicly announcing this in a speech to council members in 1877. A petition with more than 98,000 signatures was subsequently sent to President Rutherford B. Hayes, but the request for federal funding for the migration was denied. Support for these objectives began to decrease and after receiving threats from Whites, Adams moved to New Orleans in December 1878.

In 1879, Adams changed the focus of the Colonization Council to support Exodusters, African Americans who were migrating from the South to Kansas, becoming a prominent supporter of the movement. Around 30,000 African Americans moved to Kansas, but many faced economic hardships due to the fact that very little good farmland was available for purchase. Those that escaped poverty primarily worked in trades or as domestic workers in cities. In 1880, Adams travelled to Washington, D.C. to testify before a Senate special committee investigating "Negro Exodus from the Southern States", blaming the causes of the African American exodus from the South on anti-Black terror. Adams told the committee about "the nightmarish violence and insidious economic exploitation inflicted upon the freedpeople of the south by the very men who held us slaves." After the disappointing results of the migration to Kansas, Adams began supporting emigration to Liberia, which had been founded in 1824 by the American Colonization Society. Nothing is known of Adams after 1884 when the Colonization Council largely ceased to exist, although it is possible that Adams travelled to Liberia.
