= Myra Jehlen =

American academic

Myra Jehlen is Board of Governors Professor of English at Rutgers University in New Brunswick, New Jersey. She was awarded a Ph.D. from the Department of English at the University of California, Berkeley for her dissertation on William Faulkner, directed by Henry Nash Smith, a founding scholar of the field of American Studies. She holds a BA from City College of the City University of New York. She has taught at New York University, Columbia University, The State University of New York, College at Purchase, and the University of Pennsylvania. She has been a Woodrow Wilson Fellow, a Fellow of the National Endowment for the Humanities and the National Humanities Center, and has received a Guggenheim Fellowship.

== Publications ==
- The English Literatures of America 1500-1800. (with Michael Warner. New-York: Routledge, 1997.
- Readings at the Edge of Literature. Chicago: University of Chicago, 2002.
- Five Fictions in Search of Truth. Princeton: Princeton UP, 2008.
- American Incarnation: The Individual, the Nation, and the Continent. Cambridge, MA: Harvard UP, 1986.
