= KET ED =

Former television programming service in Kentucky, United States

KET ED: Education Channel
- Type: Non-commercial television network
- Branding: KET ED (on-air branding); KET Education Channel (alternate)
- Country: United States
- Availability: Kentucky (statewide) southern Illinois (limited) southern Indiana; Mississippi County, Missouri (OTA only) southwestern and south-central Ohio northern Tennessee (limited) southwestern Virginia; Huntington, West Virginia area
- Headquarters: Lexington, Kentucky
- Owner: Kentucky Authority for Educational Television
- Parent: Commonwealth of Kentucky
- Launch date: August 2007
- Dissolved: October 30, 2009 (as a linear channel); 2012 (as an online streaming service)
- Former names: KET Star Channel 704 (1988–2007); KET4 (2002–2008)
- Former affiliations: PBS digital sampler (early 2002); Annenberg/CPB Channel (2002–2009); PBS HD Channel (secondary, 2004–2008); PBS (2008–2009, replays of select programs from KET1)
- Official website: www.ket.org/kentuckychannel
- Replaced: KET4
- Replaced by: KET PBS Kids (2017-present)

KET ED, known as the Education Channel, was a digital television programming service operated by PBS member network Kentucky Educational Television. The service provided programming from the Annenberg/CPB project, along with encore presentations of some PBS programming, and much of KET's locally produced in-house instructional television (ITV) productions.

The service originated from KET's studios at the O. Leonard Press Telecommunications Center, at 600 Cooper Drive in Lexington, Kentucky.

== History ==
In May 2002, the Kentucky Educational Television network launched three additional subchannels on the digital companion signals of all fifteen of its principal transmitters. In addition to a simulcast of their analog signals, the digital channels now offered three additional services, including a statewide relaunch of Louisville-based WKMJ-TV’s signal known as KET2. The DT3 and DT4 subchannels were branded as KET3 and KET4. As a fourth digital subchannel In early 2002, KET4 began broadcasting a PBS digital sampler channel, mainly broadcasting certain PBS programs with the highest viewership in a downconverted high-definition-like quality picture. KET4 began simulcasting Star Channel 704 on September 2, 2002. The Star Channels were KET's direct broadcast satellite channels for schools, community colleges and public libraries launched in 1988 for KET's signature distance learning program.

KET4's programming lineup mostly consisted of programming from the Annenberg/CPB Channel, along with professional development seminars for educators, along with high school and college telecourses. On weeknights, KET4 also broadcast high-definition television programming from PBS from 8-11 p.m. Eastern time (7-10 p.m. Central time).

KET4 was rebranded as KET ED, also known as the Education Channel, in August 2007, broadcasting over both the DT3 and DT4 subchannels of all fifteen of KET's principal satellite stations. The channel was formed by merging the K-12 instructional programming from KET3 with the Annenberg/CPB project programming on KET4, and consolidating them into one 21-hour programming lineup. The three-hour prime time KET HD schedule remained on the KET ED service until the Kentucky Channel launched on KET's DT3 service in January 2008. When it did so, the HD schedule was relocated to the Kentucky Channel feed, and was expanded to include an additional hour of programming. After the Kentucky Channel launch in 2008, KET ED broadcast a 20-hour long schedule of mainly educational and instructional programming, along with Annenberg channel programming. The subchannel went off the air nightly during the hours that the Kentucky Channel broadcast the PBS HD schedule. Beginning in January 2009, KET ED ran programming on a 24-hour-a-day basis on Louisville's WKMJ through its DT3 subchannel.

KET ED was then discontinued as a linear channel on October 30, 2009, thus deleting the DT4 subchannels of all fifteen principal KET stations, but a KET ED programming block began to be broadcast overnights on KET KY for the next three years until the start of the 2012–13 season. KET ED still existed as a video on demand programming service on the network's website, allowing users to stream a limited selection of programming aired on the former television service, most of which is KET's original programming from the network, with some ITV programming from other producers also being offered. This action is somewhat comparable to The WB television network's 2008 relaunch as an online TV network after it went off the air as a result of the September 2006 merger with UPN to form The CW. The KET ED On Demand site was replaced by the KET Education online video library, and the nationwide online service PBS LearningMedia by 2016.

In terms of over-the-air digital broadcasting, after the KET ED channel permanently signed off of the over-the-air signals in Fall 2009, KET would never again broadcast a fourth digital subchannel on its fifteen main transmitters until December 2016, when it was reactivated and broadcasting a test card. The newly revived DT4 subchannel, which briefly revived the KET4 branding, broadcast the SMPTE color bars in the ensuing weeks prior to the launch of a new 24-hour national PBS Kids subchannel, branded as PBS Kids on KET. The new 24/7 PBS Kids began broadcasting on the DT4 subchannel on January 12, 2017 as a soft launch, four days earlier than the specified, or official launch date of January 16.

== Programming ==
The Education Channel broadcast a 20-hour schedule daily; it signed off the air at 8 p.m. Eastern Time (7 p.m. Central Time), and signs back on at 12 Midnight Eastern (11 p.m. Central). Unlike KET's other services, during the interstitials, KET ED showed various slides, often accompanied with the network's URL, and a toll-free telephone number, along with a digital clock showing the current time, as opposed to normal network promos, in between programs and/or videos. The on-screen digital clock was also used between programs on all of KET ED's predecessor services.

KET ED and its predecessors were also well known for broadcasting the network's original instructional television productions and mini-series, as well as the network's Electronic Field Trips series over the 20+ years the services were on the air. The network-produced series, which launched in 1995, were mostly documentaries about mainly historic and/or natural places in Kentucky (i.e. Mammoth Cave National Park, Old Fort Harrod State Park, Fort Boonesborough State Park, Louisville Zoo, southern Indiana’s Falls of the Ohio), but the EFT series also took students (vicariously through video) to a veterinary clinic, farms, museums, the Kentucky Center For the Arts, a dentist’s office, the Louisville National Weather Service forecast office, and even the KET network studio itself.

In addition to Annenberg Channel programming, the service also broadcast original instructional television productions syndicated from varied instructional programming producers such as the Agency for Instructional Technology, and other PBS member networks and/or affiliates, as well as replays of select PBS and PBS Kids programming that could be used for instructional programming. In many instances, select programs on KET ED, especially the network’s instructional mini-series produced for classroom use, were at several occasions aired in multi-hour “block feeds,” bunching several episodes—or in the case of some instructional programs an entire series—into a marathon of a single program. KET ED also broadcast a package of 30 select episodes of Fat Albert and the Cosby Kids that were shortened to 15 minutes each and edited specifically for instructional use.

== Availability ==
From 2007 to 2009, KET ED was broadcast over the fourth digital subchannel of all of KET's fifteen (15) principal broadcast relay stations throughout the network's coverage area, and on WKMJ-DT3/Louisville, serving much of Kentucky and some nearby sections of neighboring states. The channel was also available to several cable television systems throughout the state. After the KET3/KET4 merger in August 2007, KET ED was simulcast over the third digital subchannel until the Kentucky Channel began broadcasting on the DT3 channel in January 2008.

=== Original affiliates ===
Unless otherwise specified, the fourth subchannel of these affiliates were silent from 2009 to 2017, and now broadcast the 24-hour PBS Kids channel.

| City of license | Callsign | Virtual channel | Notes |
|---|---|---|---|
| Ashland (Huntington, West Virginia) | WKAS | 25.4 | |
| Augusta | W16EB-D | 38.4 | Originally W20CT-D 20.4 |
| Bowling Green | WKGB-TV | 53.4 | |
| Covington (Cincinnati, Ohio) | WCVN-TV | 54.4 | |
| Elizabethtown | WKZT-TV | 23.4 | |
| Falmouth | W23DM-D | 52.4 | |
| Hazard | WKHA | 35.4 | |
| Lexington | WKLE | 46.4 | |
| Louisa | W32FD-D | 25.4 | Originally W28DD-D 28.4 |
| Louisville | WKMJ-TV | 68.3 | KET ED was broadcast 24-hours a day on this affiliate. Became a World Channel affiliate in 2013. |
| Louisville | WKPC-TV | 15.4 | |
| Madisonville (Hopkinsville) | WKMA-TV | 35.4 | |
| Morehead | WKMR | 38.4 | |
| Murray (Mayfield, KY/Martin, TN) | WKMU | 21.4 | |
| Owensboro/Henderson (Evansville, Indiana) | WKOH | 31.4 | |
| Owenton (Frankfort) | WKON | 52.4 | |
| Paducah | WKPD | 29.4 | |
| Pikeville | WKPI-TV | 24.4 | |
| Somerset | WKSO-TV | 29.4 | |
