= Kentucky Channel =

Television programming service in Kentucky, United States

- Type: Non-commercial television network
- Branding: KET KY (on-air branding); KET Kentucky Channel (alternate)
- Country: United States
- Availability: Kentucky (statewide) southern Illinois (limited) southern Indiana; Mississippi County, Missouri (OTA only) southwestern and south-central Ohio northern Tennessee (limited) southwestern Virginia; Huntington, West Virginia area
- Headquarters: Lexington, Kentucky
- Owner: Kentucky Authority for Educational Television
- Parent: Commonwealth of Kentucky
- Launch date: January 1, 2008; 18 years ago
- Former names: KET Star Channel 703 (1989–2002); KET3 & Star Channel 703 (2002–2005); KET3 (2005–2007); KET ED (2007–2008)
- Affiliations: Educational independent (primary, 2008–present); PBS (encores of select programs only)
- Affiliates: List of affiliates
- Former affiliations: PBS Kids (locally-programmed 24/7 channel, 2002); PBS HD Channel (secondary, 2008–2009); KET ED (2009–2012, overnights)
- Official website: www.ket.org/kentuckychannel
- Replaced: KET3/KET Star Channel 703 (2002–07)

The Kentucky Channel, also known by its Program and System Information Protocol short name and on-screen logo bug as KET KY, is a full-time 24/7 statewide digital television programming service originating from PBS member state-network Kentucky Educational Television. The channel features programming related to the U.S. state of Kentucky (with some programming relevant to surrounding states such as Tennessee, Indiana or Virginia), as well as coverage of the Kentucky General Assembly when it is in session.

It is carried on the third digital subchannel of all fifteen (15) of KET's main satellite stations, plus Louisville-based ATSC 3.0 station and KET2 flagship station WKMJ-TV. The channel is programmed and broadcast from the O. Leonard Press Telecommunications Center at 600 Cooper Drive in Lexington, Kentucky.

== History ==
=== KET Star Channels ===
KET's Star Channels, the network's interactive distance learning services that were launched in late 1988, predated the advent of digital over-the-air television broadcasting of any kind by eleven years, and they were only available to schools, colleges, universities, and libraries throughout the state through satellite technology. Public schools were outfitted with satellite dishes and keypads, provided by NTN Communications, to provide two-way communications between the instructors at the KET studios in Lexington and students throughout the state; all public schools in Kentucky were outfitted with the technology by the end of 1989. This interactive service was inspired by a football player predictor game at a local sports bar in Lexington. The services were so successful in education centers, that the network earned the Innovations Award from the Ford Foundation for the star channels in 1991.

=== KET ITV satellite service ===
Shortly after the successful launch of the interactive Star Channels, in January 1989, KET expanded its instructional programming schedule, which had aired during school hours on the over-the-air KET network since its 1968 inception, to full-time services by launching a pair of closed-circuit satellite television instructional television services available free-to-air satellite systems made exclusively for use in education centers, one for elementary schools, and the other for middle and high schools. All schools in Kentucky were equipped with this technology by early 1990. Plans to launch these instructional television fixed services (ITFS) date back to the 1980s, when the network's over-the-air schedule was overly saturated with instructional programming, which led to the idea to launch the services and eventually, the interactive Star Channels after having conducted a study on how to expand its instructional television offerings. This, along with the 1981 inception of KET Etc, a cable-only service that was the first attempt to start a second broadcast service, helped the network to combat the overflow of programming on its primary network. A 1986 Lexington Herald-Leader interview with network founder and then-executive director O. Leonard Press revealed the plans to launch this satellite-based service.

Star Channel 703 provided PK-12 educational programming exclusively to public schools and libraries throughout the state, plus several other states. Star Channel 704 provided Annenberg/CPB Project programming, including college-credit telecourses and professional development series.

=== As KET3 ===
In early 2002, the statewide relaunch of KET2 through the facilities of WKMJ-TV (channel 68) in Louisville, along with two new digital services, KET3 and KET4, were launched over the air as multicast services that were made available through the digital signals of all fifteen principal KET satellites. Initially, KET3 began broadcasting as a locally programmed 24/7 PBS Kids channel programmed by KET, while KET4 began as a PBS digital sampler channel. KET's second, third, and fourth subchannels, which were launched in May 2002, were the first ever digital subchannels in most, if not all, of Kentucky's primary media markets (e.g. Paducah, Evansville, Bowling Green, Louisville, Cincinnati, Lexington, and Huntington markets), as most commercial outlets typically never began to launch digital signals or multicast services until the mid- to late-2000s.

On September 2, 2002, KET3 and KET4 were repurposed to become over-the-air digital relaunches of Star Channels 703 and 704 as both the then-new third and fourth subchannels began simulcasting the two respective channels, making them available to tens of thousands of homes via the digital over-the-air signals and on cable television systems for the first time. This has provided a benefit to parents of home-schooled children, and teachers at parochial schools (i.e. Christian and Catholic schools) in addition to teachers and students of public schools, as well as KET viewers that watch lifelong learning-oriented programming on a regular basis. In addition, KET4 also carried PBS HD programming during primetime hours. Sometime following that conversion, cable companies within the state began adding those digital channels to their channel lineups. The satellite-based services were discontinued on June 30, 2005, therefore making the instructional programming and Annenberg Channel programming exclusively available through KET3 and KET4, respectively.

=== Temporary KET-ED simulcast ===
From August until the end of December 2007, the network's subchannels went through a major realignment phase. Beginning in August 2007, the KET3 and KET4 services were merged to create the Education Channel, KET ED. KET ED and the PBS HD programming block were simulcast on both the DT3 and DT4 subchannels of all 15 of the network's primary transmitters for the remainder of that year.

=== Birth of The Kentucky Channel ===
On January 1, 2008, the third subchannel of KET's 15 transmitters began airing a new programming format: a then-new channel devoted to programming about Kentucky people, places, and/or events, in a schedule format similar to that of Twin Cities PBS’s Minnesota Channel. Beginning on January 1, 2008, KET3 was re-branded as the Kentucky Channel, or as identified by the network's voiceover announcer, The Kentucky Channel from KET.

Beginning with the debut of the then-new Kentucky Channel, approximately 20 hours of Kentucky-related programming was broadcast on the service. Outside of the 20 hours, the service aired the KET HD evening programming service (national PBS HD schedule) in primetime hours from 8 p.m. to 12 Midnight Eastern time (7-11 p.m. Central time), which was previously aired on KET4 outside of that service's 20 hours of Annenberg/CPB channel programming, hence the PSIP readers displaying the channel name as KETKYHD during the 2008-09 television season. The Kentucky Channel also replaced KET5 and KET6, which were discontinued at the end of December 2007, as the official broadcaster of the Kentucky General Assembly. Coverage of both the state House of Representatives and the state Senate is still available in the Frankfort area, overlapping C-SPAN3 and NASA TV on channels 16 and 17, respectively, on the Frankfort Plant Board cable system.

=== As a full-time service ===
Beginning with the 2009–10 television season, the Kentucky Channel expanded to a 24-hour programming schedule after all HD programming schedules began to be handled by the network, and moved onto the flagship service, the main channel of the fifteen principal satellite stations. An increase of fees for the usage of the national PBSHD channel feed caused the network to program PBS HD programming by itself on the main channel. After the KET ED linear service permanently signed off from the DT4 subchannels of KET's principal signals and from WKMJ-DT3, some of its former programming aired overnights on the Kentucky Channel from 1 to 6 a.m. Eastern (12 midnight to 5 a.m. Central) until that block was discontinued in 2012, making the Kentucky Channel truly full-time. KET ED still existed as an on-demand video service available on the network's website, offering a limited selection of the service's former programming until it was replaced by PBS LearningMedia in the mid-2010s.

Also in 2009, the Kentucky Channel began broadcasting over WKMJ-DT2/Louisville; it would move to that station's third subchannel upon WKMJ's conversion to the ATSC 3.0 (NextGen TV) format in 2022.

== Programming ==
Since the inception of the Kentucky Channel, it has been broadcasting an extensive programming schedule involving dozens of programs and documentaries about Kentucky-related issues, heritage, history, people and culture from KET's vast library of original programming. The channel's programming schedule also includes encore presentations of most of the current lineup of popular local programs, including the most recent episodes of the network's most watched programs, including several reruns of Kentucky Life, including the most recent episodes, along with that program's ever-popular telethon specials that originally aired from 1998 through the early- and mid-2000s during the network's annual telethons. Original programming from KET's archives broadcast on the Kentucky Channel includes several in-house productions of documentaries, including those hosted by several Kentucky authors and media personalities. The channel also airs archived episodes of original series such as Bywords, Distinguished Kentuckian, Run That By Me Again, From The Ground Up, and Kentucky Time Capsule, among others.

The channel also features programs and films produced by locally based independent production companies and film makers. Some of Kentucky's commercial television stations also produced some programs that would later air on the Kentucky Channel. For instance, in late Spring, and around the 4th of July holiday season, the channel airs some Thunder Over Louisville coverage from that city's local stations such as Fox affiliate WDRB, with the KET rebroadcast of the coverage presented commercial-free. Lexington CBS affiliate WKYT-TV even produced a documentary about former University of Kentucky basketball coach Adolph Rupp that is seldom rebroadcast on the channel as well.

Outside of KET's archives and independent production companies, some documentaries and short programs on the channel are also produced by the mass media divisions of some Kentucky colleges and universities. Following a similar format of public, educational, and/or Government access television stations, in addition to colleges, universities, and independent production companies, some programming is produced by Kentucky-based government agencies and non-profit organizations within the state, who can submit their programs for broadcast on the channel.

== Availability ==
The Kentucky Channel is broadcast over the third digital subchannel of all of KET's fifteen (15) principal broadcast relay stations, and on the network's ATSC 3.0 station WKMJ-DT3. The channel is also available to several cable television systems throughout and within the state, including Mediacom, Charter/Spectrum, Comcast/Xfinity, Zito Media, and Suddenlink Communications. It is also available on a few dozen locally owned cable companies in the state. A few out-of-state cable television systems also carry the Kentucky Channel, along with the flagship KET service; this is especially true with any out-of-state cable system that have a significant customer base in Kentucky communities along its boundaries, including the cable systems of Cincinnati Bell and the Lafayette, Tennessee-based North Central Telephone Cooperative. Depending on the program, some full episodes and a variety of video clips of KET's original programming (recent or archived) can also be viewed on the network's website.

=== Affiliates ===
==== Current ====
City of license	Callsign	Virtual channel
Ashland (Huntington/Charleston, West Virginia)	WKAS	25.3
Augusta	W16EB-D	38.3
Bowling Green	WKGB-TV	53.3
Covington (Cincinnati, Ohio)	WCVN-TV	54.3 (Note: ATSC 1.0 broadcast in the Covington/Cincinnati area is hosted by WCET (channel 48) as part of a partnership between KET and WCET.)
Elizabethtown	WKZT-TV	23.3
Falmouth	W23DM-D	52.3
Hazard	WKHA	35.3
Lexington	WKLE	46.3
Louisa	W32FD-D	25.3
Louisville	WKMJ-TV	68.3 (Note: ATSC 3.0 simulcast.)
Louisville	WKPC-TV	15.3
Madisonville (Hopkinsville)	WKMA-TV	35.3
Morehead	WKMR	38.3
Murray (Mayfield, KY/Martin, TN)	WKMU	21.3
Owensboro (Henderson, KY/Evansville, IN)	WKOH	31.3
Owenton (Frankfort)	WKON	52.3
Paducah	WKPD	29.3
Pikeville	WKPI-TV	24.3
Somerset	WKSO-TV	29.3

==== Former ====
City of license	Callsign	Virtual channel	Notes
Louisville	WKMJ-TV	68.2	Moved to WKMJ's third subchannel following the station's conversion to ATSC 3.0 in 2022

== See also ==
- Kentucky Educational Television
