= Inside/Out (American TV series) =

- Countries of origin: United States; Canada; (depending on episode)
- No. of episodes: 30

Production
- Running time: 15 Minutes

Original release
- Network: PBS
- Release: January 31, 1972 – December 21, 1973

Inside/Out is an American educational television series that aired from January 31, 1972, to December 21, 1973, on PBS.

The show was produced from 1972 to 1973 by the National Instructional Television Center (NIT), in association with various contributing stations, such as KETC in St. Louis, Missouri, WVIZ in Cleveland Ohio, WNVT-TV in Northern Virginia, and The Ontario Educational Communications Authority. It was one of the last programs to be produced by NIT; the organisation would be reformulated as the Agency for Instructional Television (AIT) in April 1973.

Funding for Inside/Out was provided by grants from 32 different educational agencies within the United States and Canada, with additional support from Exxon Corporation.

The series' uncredited theme music is an excerpt from "Ripple" by composer Simon Haseley and performed by "The London Studio Group", sourced from the De Wolfe production music library.

== Overview of series ==
Inside/Out was an anthology series of 15-minute shorts that were designed to teach children about social issues. Instead of resorting to happy endings, as many shows of this kind had done, Inside/Out typically had cliffhanger endings, leaving the viewers to draw their own conclusions as to what they would do in similar situations.

Due to the critical acclaim for this series, some PBS stations would double-run two Inside/Out episodes in a half-hour time slot in the evening so that parents could watch this series with their children.

This series was commonly watched on classroom TV broadcasts during school hours as well as on 16mm film reels. It was a staple of daytime instructional television blocks (generally programmed by local agencies or school boards rather than by PBS) on public TV stations for many years, until at least the late 1980s.

Inside/Out was the first in a series of similarly produced instructional programs made by AIT. Others that followed that used the similar formula included Bread and Butterflies (1974), Self Incorporated (1975), Trade-Offs (a program on economic theory, 1978), Thinkabout (a series on creativity, 1979), On The Level (1980) and Give & Take (a series about the economy in general and a sequel series to Trade-Offs, 1982). All of the series, including Inside/Out, were produced for only one season, but were frequently rerun on television and shown in schools for several years afterward, as the topics presented kept its currency.

In 1974, Bantam Books' young readers' Pathfinder series, in their Canadian branch, published Stories from Inside/Out by children's writer and screenwriter Ken Sobol, which adapted several of the series scripts to prose, and included discussion questions.

In 1996, AIT produced an updated version of the series, Looking from the Inside/Out.

== Program listing ==
- 1. Because It's Fun
- 2. How Do You Show?
- 3. Strong Feelings
- 4. Must I / May I?
- 5. Travelin' Shoes
- 6. Just Joking
- 7. But... Names Will Never Hurt?
- 8. Home Sweet Home
- 9. Jeff's Company
- 10. Buy and Buy
- 11. Can I Help?
- 12. Living with Love
- 13. Can Do / Can't Do
- 14. Breakup
- 15. Love, Susan
- 16. Brothers and Sisters
- 17. Someone Special
- 18. I Want To
- 19. When Is Help?
- 20. Bully
- 21. But They Might Laugh
- 22. Lost Is a Feeling
- 23. Donna
- 24. You Belong
- 25. Just One Place
- 26. In My Memory
- 27. I Dare You
- 28. Yes, I Can
- 29. A Sense of Joy
- 30. Getting Even

== Controversy ==
According to an article in the October 28, 1972 issue of TV Guide, WGBH Boston banned an episode about death from its airwaves (In My Memory), citing that the circumstances in the episode were too realistic and might scare some children.

== Awards ==
The series won the 1974 Emmy Award for 'Outstanding Instructional Children's Programming'.
