= K45AR =

Television station in Eagle Bend, Minnesota (1980–1998)

- Eagle Bend, Minnesota; United States
- Channels: Analog: 45 (UHF)

Programming
- Affiliations: Educational Independent

Ownership
- Owner: Eagle Bend schools; (Independent School District No. 790)

History
- Founded: 1980
- First air date: January 1980
- Last air date: 1998
- Former call signs: KXG2CB (1980–1984)

Technical information
- Licensing authority: FCC
- Facility ID: 28512
- Class: TX
- ERP: 1 kW
- Transmitter coordinates: 46°9′59.90″N 95°2′41.10″W

Links
- Public license information: Public file; LMS

K45AR (channel 45) was a low-power television station in Eagle Bend, Minnesota, United States. It started in the late 1970s under the call sign KXG2CB, then transmitting on a 100-watt transmitter under an experimental license from the Federal Communications Commission (FCC). K45AR was used for the first educational instructional television (ITV) system in the state. The station was run by the schools of Bertha–Hewitt, Clarissa, and Eagle Bend.

== History ==
K45AR was the idea of Eagle Bend High School principal Richard Lundgren. Lundgren was in search of getting a way to provide more educational opportunities to his students for a low cost. Instructional television allowed schools to share teachers without the teachers or students leaving their respective schools.

When K45AR first went on the air it operated under the experimental license KG2XCB. Its first transmitter was located in Eagle Bend. Its power was 100 watts and its tower was about 190 feet (58 m). Along with Eagle Bend Public Schools, the Bertha–Hewitt and Clarissa public schools each owned an Instructional Television Fixed Service (ITFS) microwave transmitter to broadcast via closed circuit between schools. Each school was located approximately five miles (8 km) apart from each other. With this system the schools could teach classes from each site and the students could interact with the teachers at each site. Because KG2XCB broadcast on a conventional UHF channel in the clear, people with a regular antenna could receive the signal at home and watch the classes being offered by the schools. The station also broadcast adult and children's educational programs when the three schools were not broadcasting, including PBS programs furnished by WDSE in Duluth.

In January 1980, the system was dedicated, attended by people from all over Minnesota and the United States.

In October 1984, the FCC granted a license to upgrade KG2XCB to become K45AR, a regular low-power UHF TV station. It now had a new 365-foot (111 m) tower and a new transmitter capable of 1,000 watts. Because of its new height and power, two more school districts were added to the ITV system: Parkers Prairie and Staples Public Schools.

Because of growing cost issues to the station's upkeep, the station was taken off the air and sold in 1998.
