= QB1 =

QB1 may refer to:

== Astronomy ==
- 1992 QB1, the first trans-Neptunian object to be discovered after Pluto and Charon, now named 15760 Albion
- Cubewano, a class of trans-Neptunian objects also known as classical Kuiper Belt objects
  - (5322) 1986 QB1
  - (7026) 1993 QB1
  - (31114) 1997 QB1
  - (36447) 2000 QB1
  - (52468) 1995 QB1

== Other uses ==
- QB1 (game), a NTN Buzztime interactive American football game of predicting what play the quarterback will make

Qb1 may refer to:

- Algebraic chess notation for a Queen moving to b1 in English
