= Thinkabout =

Thinkabout is a name used for two unrelated children's educational television series:

- Thinkabout (US TV series), US educational television series from 1979; seen mainly on PBS stations
- Thinkabout (UK TV series), a 1984 to 1986 BBC Two's in-school science programme for children; revived from 1990 to 1992 as Thinkabout Science
