= Ham's =

Defunct American restaurant chain

- Industry: Restaurant
- Founded: 1935
- Defunct: July 12, 2022
- Headquarters: Greensboro, North Carolina, United States
- Areas served: North Carolina and Virginia
- Key people: Charlie Erwin

Ham's Restaurant was a restaurant chain based in North Carolina and Virginia.

== History ==
Ham's was started in Greensboro, North Carolina in 1935. In 1984, Charlie Erwin acquired the original property. The business was expanded into the North Carolina and Southern Virginia region, and eventually comprised more than 20 restaurants under the Ham's logo. In 2009 the company filed for bankruptcy and was eventually sold at an auction. The new owners continued the business but changed parts of the business model, closed a lot of locations and opened new ones with different concepts. The last location in High Point, North Carolina closed down in 2022 due to short-staffing, effectively ending the chain.

== Former locations ==
Florida

- Jacksonville, FL

North Carolina

- Asheville, NC
- Blowing Rock, NC
- Burlington, NC
- Chapel Hill, NC
- Greensboro, NC- 4 locations
- Goldsboro, NC
- Greenville, NC
- Havelock, NC
- Hickory, North Carolina
- High Point, NC- 2 locations
- Kernersville, NC
- Kinston, NC
- New Bern, NC
- Rocky Mount, NC
- Salisbury, NC
- Sanford, NC
- Shelby, NC
- Winston-Salem, NC

Virginia

- Danville, VA
- Harrisonburg, VA
- Lynchburg, VA

== Entertainment ==
Ham's provided entertainment including live music, karaoke and NTN trivia.

== Notes ==
- Ham's menu
- accessmylibrary.com
