= WKMJ-TV =

Television station in Louisville, Kentucky

ATSC 3.0 station
- Louisville, Kentucky; United States
- Channels: Digital: 34 (UHF); Virtual: 68
- Branding: KET2

Programming
- Network: Kentucky Educational Television
- Affiliations: 68.1: KET2/PBS; 68.2: KET; for others, see § WKMJ digital channels

Ownership
- Owner: Kentucky Authority for Educational Television
- Sister stations: WKPC-TV

History
- First air date: September 2, 1970
- Former call signs: WKMJ (1970–1983)
- Former channel numbers: Analog: 68 (UHF, 1970–2009); Digital: 38 (UHF, 2003-2019)
- Former affiliations: NET (via KET, 1970); PBS (via KET, 1970–1997); Dark (1997)
- Call sign meaning: Kentucky Media and Journalism

Technical information
- Licensing authority: FCC
- Facility ID: 34195
- ERP: 40 kW
- HAAT: 257 m (843 ft)
- Transmitter coordinates: 38°22′1″N 85°49′54″W

Links
- Public license information: Public file; LMS
- Website: www.ket.org

WKMJ-TV (channel 68) is a PBS member television station in Louisville, Kentucky, United States. It is the flagship station for KET2, the second television service of Kentucky Educational Television (KET), which is owned by the Kentucky Authority for Educational Television. KET2 originates from KET's main studios at the O. Leonard Press Telecommunications Center on Cooper Drive in Lexington; in Louisville, KET has offices and production studios in the American Life Building at 471 West Main Street. Its transmitter tower is near Floyds Knobs, Indiana.

== History ==
=== As KET's original Louisville station ===
When Kentucky Educational Television began broadcasting in 1968, it was built to provide the widest statewide coverage with the fewest transmitters possible. Network officials expected that the transmitters in Elizabethtown (WKZT-TV, channel 23) and Owenton (WKON-TV, channel 54) would provide sufficient service in the Louisville area. Reception, however, was poorer than expected, prompting KET in March 1969 to announce plans to file for UHF channel 68 and strike a deal with NBC affiliate WAVE-TV (channel 3) for a new tower, which would also house a stronger transmitter for independently owned educational station WKPC-TV (channel 15). The station, with the callsign WKMJ (the -TV suffix was added in 1983), began test broadcasts on August 17, 1970, and full service began two weeks later. Channel 68 originally went off the air when the rest of the KET network was airing the same programming as WKPC-TV. Duplication remained low, and at the end of 1982, an agreement was reached for WKPC-TV to be the primary PBS outlet in Louisville.

However, after this arrangement, duplication returned. In 1995, after WKPC-TV experienced a series of financial reversals caused by for-profit ventures intended to bolster station income, talks about a merger between WKPC-TV and KET began, with the stronger channel 15 becoming KET's primary station in Louisville. An agreement was reached in December 1996, by which KET acquired certain technical assets, including the license, and the land to the Floyds Knobs tower it still shared with WKPC-TV.

=== The launch of KET2 ===
On July 1, 1997, KET's main programming moved to WKPC-TV. WKMJ-TV simultaneously suspended operations for a transmitter overhaul; it returned a month later at increased power, carrying a new service called KET2, which initially featured additional children's programs, adult education programming and local productions. Outside of Louisville, KET2 was seen on cable systems statewide; in Lexington, KET2 also replaced the cable-only KET Etc. service, which was an earlier attempt in launching a second programming service.

=== Digital subchannel history ===
In 2009, WKMJ-DT2 began broadcasting the Kentucky Channel, simulcasting the DT3 subchannel of KET's other stations. At the same time, KET ED, the Education Channel became available on WKMJ-DT3 on a 24-hour-a-day basis; this ended in September 2009, when WKMJ-DT3 went silent for four years following that linear service's discontinuation. In 2013, WKMJ-DT3 began broadcasting the World network by American Public Television (APT). As the only KET station broadcasting that network, Louisville was the only major market in Kentucky to receive that channel until 2023, when the network began offering it on WCVN-TV's ATSC 3.0 signal in Covington. In late 2020, WKMJ-TV's main channel was upgraded to 720p HD, with KETKY on 68.2 upgraded to widescreen standard definition. This upgrade also took place on the DT2 and DT3 feeds of all other KET satellites.

== Programming ==
As the second service of KET, WKMJ-TV broadcasts the national PBS schedule from the PBS Satellite Service along with additional syndicated programs from American Public Television (including how-to programs, documentaries, and imported comedy and drama series), Kentucky-focused public affairs programs, and some local programming focusing on the Louisville area. As of 2023, WKMJ-TV does not air children's programming broadcast by PBS or through independent distributors; this is despite that FCC Children's Television Act regulations (which require television stations to air a minimum of three hours of educational children's programming per week) apply to WKMJ, as it transmits the KET2 schedule locally. (While KET2 is simulcast on the DT2 subchannel of KET's other stations, exemptions to Children's Television Act enforcement—as implemented in January 2020—only apply to services transmitted exclusively through subchannels.)

== Availability ==
KET2 was originally available exclusively in the Louisville market over-the-air upon its launch in 1997; some cable systems elsewhere in Kentucky, including systems in Lexington, began to carry the service. The over-the-air statewide relaunch of KET2, via the digital television signals of all KET stations broadcasting the statewide feed, occurred in May 2002 with the network making KET2 available through a second digital subchannel. The 15 principal KET satellites and 3 accompanying digital low-powered translators presently provide KET2 on their respective DT2 subchannels.

Currently, KET2's cable carriage covers roughly 62% of all subscribers in the state. This includes most Charter Spectrum systems, including all of the state's major cities and several rural areas. It is also available on DirecTV and Dish Network satellite television in the Louisville market. KET2 is also available on cable in Louisville's southern Indiana suburbs.

In 2023, as part of a NextGenTV partnership between KET and WPTO in Oxford, Ohio (in the Cincinnati market), WCVN's simulcast of KET2 has relocated onto WPTO's signal following WCVN's conversion to ATSC 3.0.

== Digital television ==
=== WKMJ-DT ===
WKMJ-TV began broadcasting its digital television companion signal, WKMJ-DT, in 2003, making it the last television station in the KET system to do so.

=== Analog-to-digital conversion ===
On April 16, 2009, WKMJ-TV shut down its analog signal on UHF channel 68 in compliance with the federally-mandated digital television transition. The station's digital signal remained on its pre-transition UHF channel 38. Digital television receivers display the station's virtual channel as 68, its former UHF analog channel, which was one of the upper-band UHF channels (52–69) that was discontinued for broadcast television use with that transition.

=== Spectrum incentive auction results ===
In July 2017, WKMJ-TV held a construction permit to move its digital signal to UHF channel 34 as part of the network's participation in the 2016–17 FCC Spectrum incentive auction. WKMJ's digital signal was reallocated to its new position in October 2019.

=== ATSC 3.0 ===
On September 19, 2022, at 11 a.m. Eastern Daylight Time, the signal of WKMJ was upgraded to become the first ATSC 3.0 station in the KET system, and the second ATSC 3.0 station in the Louisville market after WBKI.

=== WKMJ digital channels ===
WKMJ is one of only two KET-network stations whose subchannels are not configured the same way as the other satellites. The station's signal is multiplexed in this manner:

Subchannels of WKMJ-TV
Subchannel	Res.	Short name	Programming
68.1	720p	KET2	PBS ("KET2")
68.2	720p	KET	KET
68.3	480i	KETKY	Kentucky Channel
68.4	480i	KETKIDS	PBS Kids

== See also ==
- Kentucky Educational Television
- List of ATSC 3.0 television stations in the United States
