= Kentucky Educational Television =

PBS member network serving Kentucky

- statewide Kentucky; United States

Programming
- Subchannels: .1: KET; .2: KET2; .3: Kentucky Channel; .4: PBS Kids
- Affiliations: PBS, APT

Ownership
- Owner: Kentucky Authority for Educational Television

History
- First air date: September 23, 1968

Links
- Website: ket.org
- For technical information, see § Stations.

Kentucky Educational Television (KET) is a statewide television network serving the U.S. commonwealth of Kentucky as a member of PBS. It is operated by the Kentucky Authority for Educational Television, an agency of the Kentucky state government, which provides more than half of its annual funding. KET is the dominant public broadcaster in the commonwealth, with transmitters covering the vast majority of the state as well as parts of adjacent states; the only other PBS member in Kentucky is WKYU-TV (channel 24) in Bowling Green. KET is the largest PBS state network in the United States; the broadcast signals of its sixteen stations cover almost all of the state, as well as parts of Illinois, Indiana, Missouri, Ohio, Tennessee, Virginia, and West Virginia. The network's offices, network center, and primary studio facilities are located at the O. Leonard Press Telecommunications Center on Cooper Drive in Lexington; KET also has production centers at the American Life Building on West Main Street in Louisville and at the Kentucky State Capitol Annex on Capitol Avenue in Frankfort.

The plan for a statewide educational broadcaster was first conceived in 1959 by O. Leonard Press, who served as the founding director for the Kentucky Authority for Educational Television when it was established in 1962 and remained with KET for three decades. Broadcasting began on September 23, 1968, and the network grew into a force in educational, cultural, and public affairs broadcasting in the state. Some of its educational programs, such as distance learning and adult education, attracted national interest. In 1997, KET took over WKPC-TV, which had formerly been a separate public television station in Louisville; in the years that followed, KET became the first digital broadcaster in Kentucky. In addition to offering national programming from PBS and other distributors, KET produces programs on Kentucky public affairs and culture as well as educational content. One of its four channels is the Kentucky Channel, which covers the Kentucky General Assembly. Beyond state government support, it receives funding from supporting viewers and, until 2025, the Corporation for Public Broadcasting.

== History ==
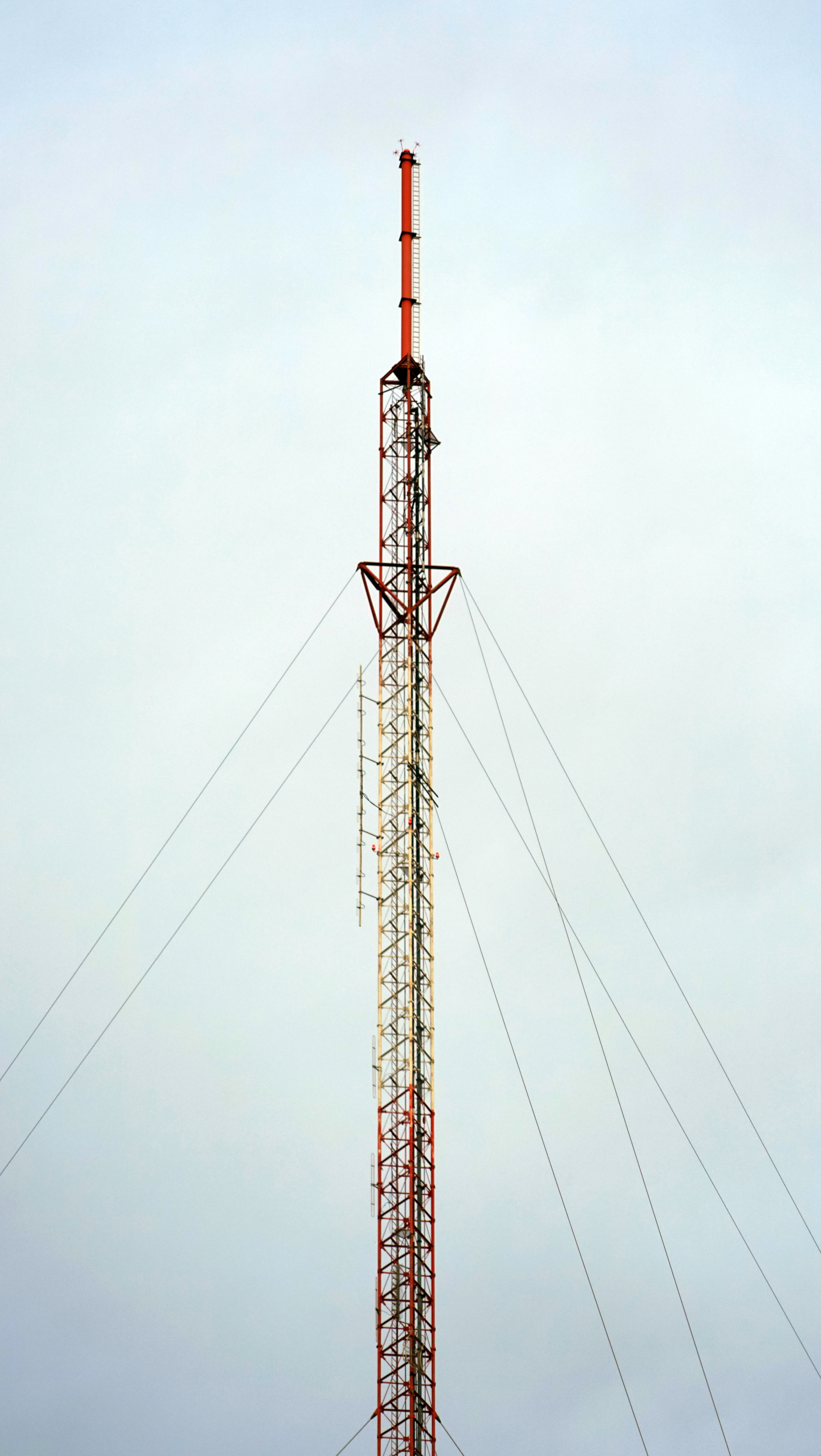
The KET tower in New Albany, Indiana, broadcasts WKPC-TV and WKMJ-TV to the Louisville area.

=== Creation of the network ===
Interest in educational television in Kentucky existed but was later compared to some other states. In 1953, an educational figure in Louisville told Bill Ladd of The Courier Journal, "I just hope that Arkansas, Mississippi, and Tennessee don't get so far ahead of us that we can't ever catch up. I hope that Kentucky doesn't start off 48th in educational television." While Jefferson County, home to Louisville, began the process to build what became WFPK-TV (now WKPC-TV) on channel 15 in 1957, and the station signed on the next year, the impetus for what became KET came on July 22, 1959, when O. Leonard Press, the director of the radio department at the University of Kentucky (UK)—owner of educational radio station WBKY, on air since 1940—proposed a statewide educational television network that would include studios at the university, interconnection with other universities, and a transmitter system to deliver educational programs to schools. This service was conceived along the lines of Alabama Educational Television, which had started in 1955 as the first statewide educational network. Press touted a system incorporating WFPK-TV as well as complete coverage of the Commonwealth with the capacity to "stamp out illiteracy" and ensure universal teaching of basic school subjects. He also pushed for the entire network to be built at once to ensure that rural areas, which most needed such a service, were just as well-served as Kentucky's population centers.

The network took an important step forward when the Federal Communications Commission (FCC) agreed to designate 10 new UHF television channels in the state for non-commercial educational use in August 1961; the original design did not include the transmitters at Elizabethtown or Owenton (as the existing WFPK-TV was included), though it did provide for programs to originate from Lexington, Louisville, or Murray. The plan gained the support of governor Bert T. Combs, and the 1962 Kentucky General Assembly passed a trio of bills to set up the Kentucky Authority for Educational Television, enable the State Board of Education to lease facilities, and allow the state to issue revenue bonds to finance construction. It was hoped to begin KET broadcasts by December 1963, but difficulties mounted, including the refusal of the Midwest Program on Airborne Television Instruction (MPATI) to sign a contract to furnish programs until schools enrolled in its service. In October 1963, the Kentucky Authority for Educational Television applied for the first construction permits to build the network after clarifying grant rules that initially seemed to make the state government ineligible for funding from the United States Department of Health, Education, and Welfare.

However, a two-year setback was experienced in 1964 when the General Assembly—which budgets on a biennial basis—refused to fund construction of the transmitters. Other state needs were prioritized: in education, these included issues in Jefferson County, low teacher pay, and transportation problems. Planning activities continued during the period. The Elizabethtown transmitter had been added to the proposed network by 1965, when a feature article in the Sunday Herald-Leader noted that Kentucky's plan for transmitter construction had been adopted by other states, notably Georgia. Schools, meanwhile, continued to depend on sources such as MPATI and commercial stations in bordering states, such as WSAZ-TV in Huntington, West Virginia. However, MPATI increased its fees, and WSAZ-TV dropped the mathematics program it was carrying due to scheduling difficulties, affecting 2,700 students in eastern Kentucky. Schools in south-central Kentucky continued to utilize educational programs from WDCN-TV in Nashville, Tennessee; Glasgow had been among the charter users of WDCN educational programming when it began in 1962, and Bowling Green followed suit in 1964.

The 1966 General Assembly budget provided the necessary funds to start work on building KET by including a $359,000 (equivalent to $3,562,385 in 2025) appropriation. Another impetus was given by the Stuart Blazer Foundation, set up by Ashland Oil founder Paul G. Blazer in memory of his deceased son. The foundation began buying and deeding transmitter sites to the state, beginning with the Somerset site in April 1966. Federal matching funds were applied for and received from the Department of Health, Education, and Welfare and the Appalachian Regional Commission, while the FCC granted the 12 construction permits later in the year. After awarding WCVN-TV in Covington in late September, the commission awarded the remaining construction permits in November, the largest single award of permits to one applicant in its history. Ground was broken on the Lexington production center in June 1967, followed by bids for the equipment needed at the studios and transmitters.

By May 1968, work on the Lexington and Somerset transmitters had been completed, and KET had announced its initial array of 19 in-school programs, mostly for elementary school students. However, site problems snarled work in Covington. Ashland Oil had provided property in the Taylor Mill area, though the city of Covington also provided sites. However, Taylor Mill met with citizen protest despite being approved by the city council, while sites in Covington would interfere with a new instrument landing system for the Greater Cincinnati Airport. As a result, KET opted to return to Taylor Mill, in spite of opposition whipped up by a local housewife who fretted the facility would be a hazard to aviation and generate interference to reception of other TV stations.

=== The O. Leonard Press years (1968–1992) ===
KET finally went on the air for the first time on September 23, 1968, at 7:30 a.m. Eastern Time (6:30 a.m. Central Time). The first broadcast started with Governor Louie B. Nunn speaking at the network's dedication ceremony; Nunn himself turned the dial to officially put the network on the air. That first day, eight transmitters opened, at Ashland, Bowling Green, Elizabethtown, Lexington, Madisonville, Morehead, Owenton, Somerset, plus two dependent translators at Hopkinsville and Owensboro. Initially unable to produce its own programs, the original set of courses broadcast by KET were leased or purchased from other producers. The initial broadcast was viewed by about 1,400 schools.

The Hazard, Murray and Pikeville transmitters, construction of which was delayed by weather, were not ready in time for the start of the network; Murray went into service on October 7, Hazard on November 13, and Pikeville followed suit in January 1969. WCVN-TV in Covington began broadcasting on September 8, 1969. Approximately 72 percent of the state's school districts were equipped to utilize KET programs at launch, a figure that grew to 85 to 90 percent within a year. After exclusively providing programs for schools, KET initiated evening broadcasting utilizing programs from National Educational Television on January 6, 1969, a delay that allowed time to train personnel and complete the studio setup. KET transitioned to become a member station of PBS in 1970 upon its creation. That same year, it debuted its first instructional series, the 17-lesson Kentucky Is My Land for use in 7th-grade history classes.

After the initial twelve-transmitter network was completed, three more stations were added between 1970 and 1980. Network reception turned out to be poor in the Louisville area, prompting the network to launch WKMJ-TV (channel 68) on August 31, 1970. In Paducah, unsuccessful commercial station WDXR-TV (channel 29) was donated to the network; it was rebuilt and returned as WKPD in 1979, and a full-power Owensboro transmitter, WKOH-TV (channel 31), started operating on February 14, 1980. After the sign-on of WKOH, the network was broadcasting over a total of 15 transmitters throughout the state and on eight low-power translator stations, primarily in eastern Kentucky. By this time, however, the production of programs from studios at the state universities had ceased except for taped content, with Lexington serving as KET's only studio site. KET began to receive PBS programming via satellite on April 15, 1978.

During the 1970s, KET also matured in the area of programming and structure. Friends of KET, a non-profit volunteer organization supporting KET's fundraising, was incorporated in 1971. Three years later, Comment on Kentucky, one of KET's flagship public affairs shows, debuted. In March 1975, KET broadcast the network's first telethon, dubbed Festival '75, a 10-day-long programming schedule that temporarily converted the network to an alternative channel to commercial outlets; this was done in hopes of expanding regular programming to a seven-day basis. Three months later, KET began broadcasting seven days a week with the debut of a Saturday schedule. In 1978, KET initiated nightly coverage during the sessions of the Kentucky General Assembly. In expanding its public affairs remit, KET had to deal with political controversy, notably around its legislative coverage.

These increased public affairs and other programs did not detract from KET's educational mission. By 1977, 75 percent of Kentucky schools used KET programming, primarily in elementary classes, including 99.3 percent of the state's students in special education. The network produced a GED adult education series sold to stations in 25 states and the Department of Defense. The nationally regarded GED program in several iterations has continued to be a part of KET. In 1989, country musician Waylon Jennings earned his GED by watching tapes of the KET programs on his tour bus.

The early 1980s were a time of budget cuts for many public broadcasters, including KET. The network was in part insulated by a timing quirk: federal construction credits from the new facilities in Paducah and Owensboro accrued to KET in 1980 and 1981 and offset most of the state's budget cuts. Despite this environment, Press continued to push for ambitious expansion. KET etc. began broadcasting on Lexington's new cable system in 1981 with adult education programs as well as replays of KET programming. In order to make the service more widely available in Lexington and statewide on translators, KET applied for the then-open commercial channel 62 in the area, but after three commercial groups also sought the channel, KET withdrew its proposal in June 1982. Despite budget cuts, Press was reluctant to cede to commercializing inroads. KET did not air regular annual pledge drives, branded as Telefund, until March 1981, and underwriting announcements were modest and did not use company logos.

I think of us as an educational institution that uses television as its method of reaching its clientele. Our business is education, not broadcasting. Broadcasting is just our means of accomplishing our mission.

— O. Leonard Press

Later in the decade, Press proposed that KET begin satellite delivery of its in-school programming directly to schools. This system began to take shape in 1988 under the name KET Star Channels. Schools were outfitted with satellite dishes as well as keypads designed to provide two-way communication between instructors in Lexington and students throughout the state, inspired by a football play predictor game at a Lexington sports bar; KET reached an agreement with the maker, NTN Communications, to use its technology. Additionally, ground was broken on an expansion to the KET facility. The first Star Channels course, on statistics and probability, was taught in January 1989 to 24 Kentucky high schools and another 41 high schools in 16 states. The program was then rolled out statewide in the wake of the Kentucky Supreme Court finding the state's education system unconstitutional. Star Channels attracted international attention, including delegations from China and Kuwait.

In 1990, the General Assembly established the KET Fund for Independent Productions, a grant program to support the development of independent films in Kentucky.

Press announced his retirement from KET effective June 30, 1992. He would be replaced by Virginia Gaines Fox of Campbellsville, whom Press had hired to KET at the network's launch in 1968. By his retirement, Press had been honored as national public television manager of the year and had also served as chair of the National Association of Educational Broadcasters and the PBS board of directors and the vice chair of the National Association of Public Television Stations. That October, KET opened a 67,000-square-foot (6,200 m^{2}) expansion of its Lexington facility, which was dedicated as the O. Leonard Press Telecommunications Center in this honor.

=== Acquisition of WKPC-TV and digitalization ===
Since opening WKMJ-TV in 1970, KET had competed with Louisville's WKPC-TV for viewers and supporters in that market. Attempts in the 1980s to reduce the duplication of programming between WKPC and KET had been largely unsuccessful. However, WKPC's owner, locally based Fifteen Telecommunications, Inc., had suffered a series of financial mishaps in the 1990s. As a result, in April 1996, the WKPC-TV board of directors opted to begin pursuing a merger into KET.

An agreement was reached between WKPC-TV and the Kentucky Authority for Educational Television in December 1996, by which KET acquired certain technical assets, including the land on which their shared transmission tower in New Albany, Indiana, sat, and the license. On July 1, 1997, KET's main programming moved to WKPC-TV. WKMJ-TV simultaneously suspended operations for a transmitter overhaul; it returned a month later at increased power, carrying a new service called KET2, which was designed with the Louisville metropolitan area in mind and initially featured additional children's programs, adult education programming and local productions. Outside of Louisville, KET2 was seen on cable systems statewide, and it replaced the former KET Etc. channel in Lexington. The state network also added to its schedule several programs that WKPC-TV had aired in the Louisville area but not KET in the rest of the state.

KET was the first Kentucky television station to begin digital broadcasts, with WKPC-DT in Louisville being activated on August 19, 1999, by governor Paul E. Patton as part of the opening day festivities of the Kentucky State Fair. This transition also placed KET among the first 10 public broadcasters to begin digital broadcasts. By late 2002, KET had completed digital rollout from all of its main transmitters and had begun multicasting four channels.

Gaines Fox retired at the end of 2002, having led KET through its digital television deployment and increased private support for the broadcaster. Local programming funding had tripled from 1989 to 2002, and the Kentucky independent film program ranked among the national leaders; 11,000 Kentucky high school students were enrolled in KET's distance learning classes. Fox was replaced by Malcolm "Mac" Wall, the executive director of the Oklahoma Educational Television Authority. Wall sought to improve engagement with Louisville by hiring a director of Louisville operations, the network's first executive based in the city, and opening an office there in addition to sharing studios with the Jefferson County school system. The network ceased analog broadcasting from all main transmitters on April 16, 2009. Later that year, KET opened a high-definition TV production center in Lexington. However, KET was one of the harder-hit PBS members by the Great Recession; in 2008, it lost $1.8 million in funding from the state of Kentucky and cut its staff by 18 percent.

=== Shae Hopkins leadership (2010–2026) ===
To replace Wall, KET tapped Shae Hopkins, who had been a senior executive for the network and had been a staff member since 1986; unlike with Wall, executives opted not to conduct a national search in order to save money during major state budget cuts.

KET consolidated its separate Louisville offices and studios in 2011, adding the second streetside studio in American public television to its Main Street facility.

On January 29, 2014, the United States Department of Agriculture awarded KET a grant worth $357,700, as part of its Public Television Digital Transition Grant program, to upgrade 20 analog microwave relays for WKSO, WKMR, WKHA and WKPI to digital, in order to provide digital television service to rural areas of Kentucky.

KET's distance learning offerings transitioned to online-only delivery before being discontinued in 2018 after 30 years due to state budget cuts in Kentucky. Enrollment had dwindled to 648 students; four full-time and 14 part-time employees lost their jobs as a result. On September 18, 2018, the Kentucky Historical Society dedicated a historical marker at the network's studio facility in observance of the network's 50th anniversary.

In 2025, the Corporation for Public Broadcasting was defunded by Congress. As a result, KET laid off 15 employees and eliminated 21 other positions.

Hopkins died on October 29, 2026; she announced her retirement two months before, intending to step down at year's end.

=== Renee Shaw leadership (2026–present) ===
On November 3, 2026, it was announced that longtime KET on-air personality Renee Shaw, who previously retired from hosting various public affairs programs in the summer prior, was named the new executive director and CEO, replacing Hopkins.

== Funding ==
In fiscal year 2022–23, KET raised $32.5 million in operating revenue, 52% of which was represented by $16.8 million in funding from the Kentucky state government. The Corporation for Public Broadcasting accounted for another 12% of revenue, with the remainder split between grants (15%) and private donations (21%). KET had 35,883 members in fiscal year 2021–22.

== Programming ==
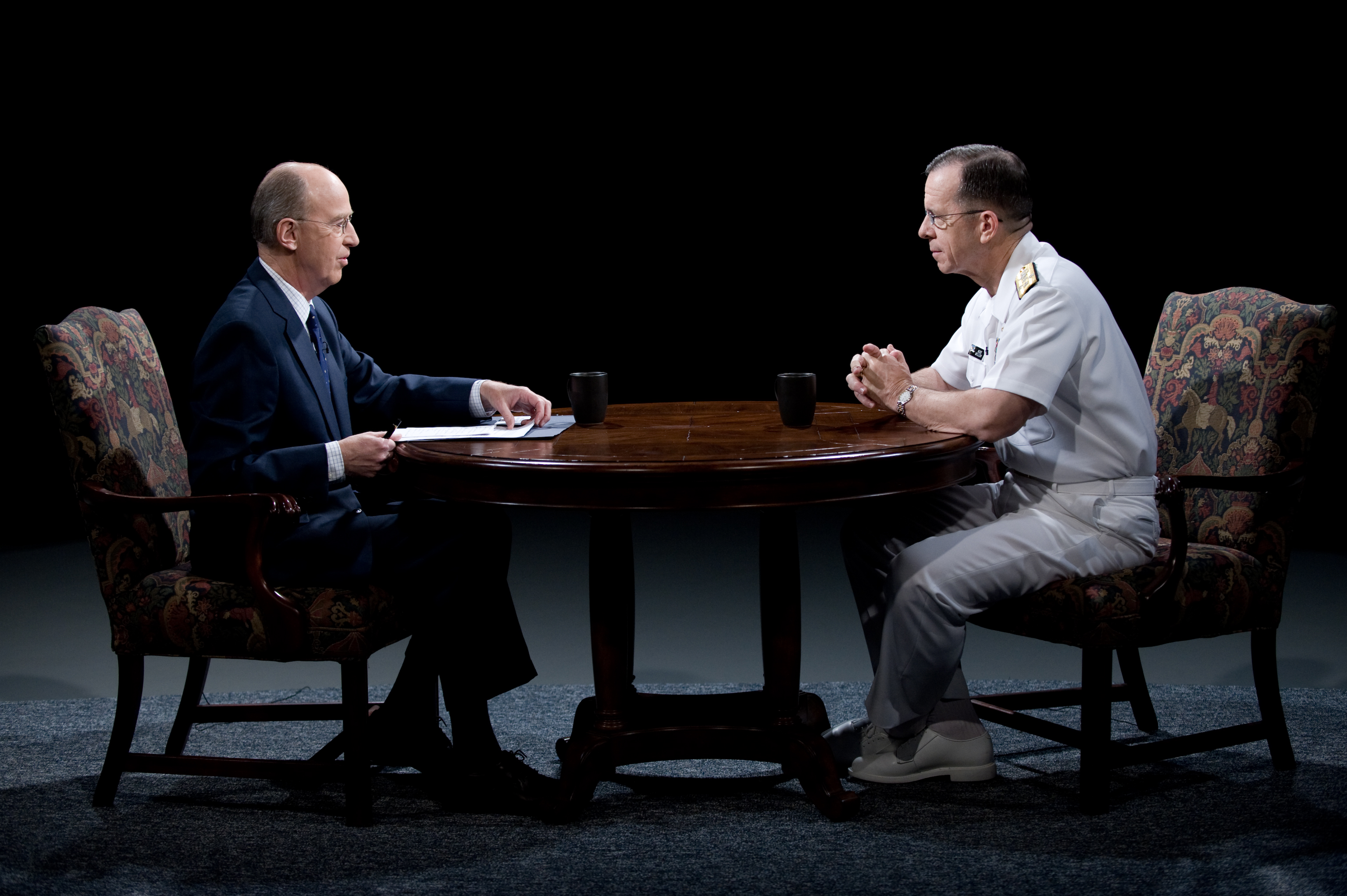
Bill Goodman interviews chairman of the Joint Chiefs of Staff Michael Mullen on KET's One on One in 2008

KET's local programs generally center around one of three topics: Kentucky public affairs, Kentucky history and culture, and education.

=== Public affairs ===
On November 15, 1974, KET debuted Comment on Kentucky, a weekly public affairs program and political roundtable hosted by Al Smith, a newspaper publisher from Russellville. Smith hosted the program from 1974 to 1979 and again from 1982 to 2007, taking leave from KET when he was named to co-chair the Appalachian Regional Commission. By the time of his retirement, Smith was the longest-tenured host of a public affairs program on public television. The program was credited with bringing the state together, utilizing KET's statewide reach to discuss Kentucky issues. After Smith's retirement, Ferrell Wellman hosted Comment on Kentucky until 2013; he was replaced, first on an interim and then on a permanent basis, by Bill Bryant, news anchor for Lexington commercial station WKYT-TV.

Comment on Kentucky was joined in 1994 by Kentucky Tonight, which originally was a nightly statewide newscast before being retooled into an interview program. In addition to Kentucky Tonight, KET public affairs director Renee Shaw hosts Connections, a community affairs and interview program that began production in 2005, and Kentucky Edition, a new nightly news program that premiered in 2022.

KET also organizes political debates. Its first gubernatorial debate took place in 1975 and was moderated by Smith. In each gubernatorial election year from 1979 through 1995, KET organized and broadcast two gubernatorial debates; in 1999, incumbent governor Paul E. Patton faced weak opposition, and no debate was organized.

=== History and culture ===
In 1985, KET began airing Kentucky Afield, an outdoors show produced by the Kentucky Department of Fish and Wildlife Resources. The program had been on the air for more than 30 years and was previously syndicated for air by local commercial stations around the commonwealth.

1995 saw the debut of Kentucky Life, a feature magazine originally hosted by Byron Crawford of The Courier-Journal and later by Dave Shuffett from 1999 to 2015. From 2015 to 2022, former baseball player Doug Flynn was host; he was replaced by Chip Polston, a frequent on-air volunteer during KET's pledge drives, starting with season 28 in January 2023.

Other KET productions over the years have covered diverse aspects of Kentucky culture. In 2020, KET debuted The Farmer and the Foodie, an educational food show with hosts traveling the state.

=== Education ===
While most of KET's educational content is now delivered outside of television, its production continues at KET. The network was one of the first PBS LearningMedia partners when the service was created in its present form in 2011; KET content on PBS LearningMedia generated 3.5 million views, more than half outside of Kentucky, in KET's 2020–21 fiscal year. KET also continues to offer GED education services under the brand FastForward.

In 1987, the KET Enterprises unit began syndicating Learn to Read, an adult literacy program produced by commercial station WXYZ-TV in Detroit for people with a fourth-grade education or less, to public television stations.

== Stations ==
KET broadcasts from 16 main transmitters and three low-powered translators on the ultra high frequency (UHF) band. In the Louisville area, KET has two transmitters: WKPC-TV (channel 15) and WKMJ-TV (channel 68), a legacy of when WKPC-TV was a separate station before being bought by KET in 1997. The latter converted to ATSC 3.0 (NextGen TV) operation on September 19, 2022. WCVN-TV in Covington began ATSC 3.0 broadcasts on June 5, 2023, as part of a partnership with Public Media Connect, the public broadcaster serving the Cincinnati area; KET provides transmission capacity in 3.0 format for WCET and WPTO (as well as datacasting capabilities for both organizations) and vice versa in 1.0 format, with fiber delivering signals between Lexington and Dayton, Ohio. This was the first partnership between separately owned public broadcasters.

Kentucky Educational Television transmitters
Station	City of license	Channel; TV (RF)	Facility ID	ERP	HAAT	Transmitter coordinates	First air date	Public license information
WCVN-TV	Covington	54 (22)	34204	39.9 kW	132 m (433 ft)	39°1′51″N 84°30′23″W	September 8, 1969	Public file; LMS
WKAS	Ashland	25 (36)	34171	63.2 kW	156 m (512 ft)	38°27′44″N 82°37′12″W	September 23, 1968	Public file; LMS
WKGB-TV	Bowling Green	53 (29)	34177	32.4 kW	248.3 m (814.6 ft)	37°5′23″N 86°38′5″W	September 23, 1968	Public file; LMS
WKHA	Hazard	35 (33)	34196	55.9 kW	384.8 m (1,262.5 ft)	37°11′35″N 83°11′17″W	November 13, 1968	Public file; LMS
WKLE	Lexington	46 (35)	34207	35.8 kW	268 m (879.3 ft)	37°52′45″N 84°19′33″W	September 23, 1968	Public file; LMS
WKMA-TV	Madisonville	35 (31)	34212	36.7 kW	316 m (1,037 ft)	37°11′21″N 87°30′49″W	September 23, 1968	Public file; LMS
WKMJ-TV	Louisville	68 (34)	34195	40 kW	257 m (843 ft)	38°22′1″N 85°49′54″W	September 2, 1970	Public file; LMS
WKMR	Morehead	38 (30)	34202	60.5 kW	297.2 m (975.1 ft)	38°10′38″N 83°24′17″W	September 23, 1968	Public file; LMS
WKMU	Murray	21 (17)	34174	32.7 kW	199.8 m (655.5 ft)	36°41′34″N 88°32′11″W	October 7, 1968	Public file; LMS
WKOH	Owensboro	31 (17)	34205	37.3 kW	142 m (466 ft)	37°51′7″N 87°19′44″W	February 14, 1980	Public file; LMS
WKON	Owenton	52 (24)	34211	28.7 kW	231 m (758 ft)	38°31′32″N 84°48′39″W	September 23, 1968	Public file; LMS
WKPC-TV	Louisville	15 (30)	21432	58 kW	266.1 m (873.0 ft)	38°22′1″N 85°49′54″W	September 8, 1958 (Note: As a separate non-commercial educational station. WKPC-TV joined KET on July 1, 1997.)	Public file; LMS
WKPD	Paducah	29 (23)	65758	90 kW	159 m (522 ft)	37°5′40″N 88°40′20″W	May 31, 1971 (Note: As commercial independent station WDXR-TV, which operated until October 22, 1975. The license was sold to KET and the facility rebuilt and returned to service as WKPD on September 9, 1979.)	Public file; LMS
WKPI-TV	Pikeville	22 (23)	34200	45.1 kW	427.7 m (1,403.2 ft)	37°17′6″N 82°31′28″W	January 1969	Public file; LMS
WKSO-TV	Somerset	29 (17)	34222	49.1 kW	452 m (1,483 ft)	37°10′3″N 84°49′30″W	September 23, 1968	Public file; LMS
WKZT-TV	Elizabethtown	23 (23)	34181	33.7 kW	192.8 m (632.5 ft)	37°40′55″N 85°50′31″W	September 23, 1968	Public file; LMS

=== Translators ===
KET also operates three translator stations:

KET translators
City of license	Call sign	Channel	Facility ID	ERP	HAAT	Transmitter coordinates	First air date	Translating
Augusta	W16EB-D	16	167571	0.8 kW	−18.2 m (−59.7 ft)	38°46′4.2″N 84°0′34.7″W	October 11, 2007	WKMR
Falmouth	W23DM-D	23	167570	0.8 kW	26.7 m (87.6 ft)	38°40′9.2″N 84°19′34.7″W	January 12, 2007	WKON
Louisa	W32FD-D	32	167569	0.12 kW	21.8 m (71.5 ft)	38°6′36.3″N 82°36′34.5″W	March 1, 1973 (as W10AR)	WKAS

KET previously had translators in other communities throughout the state. The original network design included translators at Hopkinsville and Owensboro. Another five were added by 1973, including Barbourville, Cowan Creek, Pineville, and Whitesburg. The Owensboro translator was taken out of service in 1974 when its location, the Daviess County Vocational School, was demolished; no good local KET signal was available there until WKOH-TV was built in 1979.

=== Network map ===
Map of all of KET's satellites in Kentucky

== Subchannels ==
KET's transmitters broadcast four subchannels in most areas:

- The main KET channel;
- KET2, a secondary service created in 1997 in the wake of the Louisville merger, with an emphasis on how-to and travel programs and replays of PBS programs;
- The Kentucky Channel (KET KY), established in 2008, which covers the Kentucky General Assembly and broadcasts programs about Kentucky topics and independently produced programs;
- and KET PBS Kids, which was introduced in 2017.

The ATSC 3.0 transmitters at Louisville and Covington also make the World Channel available as subchannel 5.

KET multiplex
Subchannel	Res.	Short name	Programming
xx.1	720p	KET	PBS
xx.2 (Note: In Louisville, 68.1 instead of 15.2)	720p	KET2	KET2
xx.3	480i	KETKY	Kentucky Channel
xx.4	480i	KETKIDS	PBS Kids

In northern Kentucky, WCET broadcasts subchannels 54.1 and 54.3 of WCVN-TV in ATSC 1.0 format, while WPTO broadcasts subchannels 54.2 and 54.4.

Subchannels of WKMJ-TV
Subchannel	Res.	Short name	Programming
68.1	720p	KET2	PBS ("KET2")
68.2	720p	KET	KET
68.3	480i	KETKY	Kentucky Channel
68.4	480i	KETKIDS	PBS Kids

Subchannels of WCVN-TV
Subchannel	Res.	Short name	Programming
54.1	1080p	KET	KET
54.2	1080p	KET2	KET2
54.5	480p	WorldSD	World
14.1	1080p	WPTO	WPTO 14.1
48.1	1080p	WCET	WCET 48.1

From 2007 to 2010, KET broadcast KET ED, the Education Channel, which provided professional development and instructional programming. Until 2008, dedicated KET5 and KET6 subchannels carried live coverage of the Kentucky House of Representatives and Senate.

== Bibliography ==
=== Books ===
- Press, O. Leonard (2008). The KET Story: A Personal Account. Lexington, Kentucky: The Clark Group. ISBN 978-1-883589-89-9.
- Nash, Francis M. (1995). Towers Over Kentucky: A History of Radio and TV in the Bluegrass State (PDF). Host Communications, Inc. ISBN 978-1-879688-93-3. Archived (PDF) from the original on April 27, 2022.
