= QB1 (game) =

QB1 game established in 1984 being revived by NTN Buzztime corporation

QB1: The Game is a trivia-based interactive entertainment platform developed by NTN Buzztime. Launched in 1984, QB1 has become a popular choice for entertainment in bars, restaurants, and other social venues.

== History ==
QB1 was developed by NTN Buzztime, a leader in interactive entertainment technology. Established in 1984, NTN_Buzztime has been providing innovative gaming solutions to businesses across various industries. QB1 was one of their earliest creations and quickly gained popularity due to its unique approach to trivia gaming.

== Gameplay ==
QB1 offers a competitive trivia experience where players can test their knowledge and compete against others. The game is played on a specialized console, typically found in bars and restaurants. The console consists of a screen and a set of multiple-choice buttons, allowing players to select their answers.

Players compete in real-time against others present in the same venue or even remotely connected to other locations. A host asks questions across a wide range of categories, such as sports, history, pop culture, and more. Participants have a limited time to select their answers, adding an element of speed to the gameplay.

The game keeps track of each player's score and displays rankings throughout the session. This competitive aspect adds excitement and encourages players to strive for high scores.

== Impact ==
QB1 has had a significant impact on the trivia gaming industry since its launch. By combining trivia with real-time competition, NTN Buzztime revolutionized the way people interacted with bar and restaurant entertainment. QB1 created a social and engaging atmosphere, encouraging patrons to stay longer, interact with each other, and return to participating venues.

The success of QB1 led to the creation of other trivia-based games by NTN Buzztime, further solidifying their position as a leader in the industry. Today, their interactive gaming solutions can be found in thousands of establishments worldwide, enhancing the overall entertainment experience for customers.

QB1 is a game where the player can predict outcomes drive by drive during live football games. The game must be played in-venue at participating locations that are customers of NTN_Buzztime
