= WUKY =

Coordinates: 37.879°N 84.326°W

- Lexington, Kentucky; United States
- Broadcast area: Lexington Metro Area; Central Kentucky
- Frequency: 91.3 MHz (HD Radio)
- Branding: NPR Rocks @ 91.3

Programming
- Format: Adult Album Alternative; Public radio
- Subchannels: HD2: Urban Alternative "The Break"; HD3: WUKY simulcast
- Affiliations: National Public Radio (NPR); Public Radio International (PRI); American Public Media (APM); BBC World Service

Ownership
- Owner: University of Kentucky

History
- First air date: October 17, 1940; 85 years ago (in Beattyville, moved to Lexington in 1944)
- Former call signs: WBKY (1940–1989)
- Former frequencies: 42.9 MHz (1940–1944; 1945–1947)
- Call sign meaning: W University of KentuckY

Technical information
- Facility ID: 4303
- Class: C1
- ERP: 100,000 watts
- HAAT: 237.4 meters (779 ft)

Links
- Webcast: Listen live
- Website: wuky.org

WUKY (91.3 FM) is a listener-supported, public radio station in Lexington, Kentucky. Owned by the University of Kentucky (UK), it has an Adult Album Alternative radio format, airing more than 100 hours of music per week. Some news and informational programming is supplied by National Public Radio (NPR), Public Radio International (PRI), American Public Media (APM) and the BBC. The station broadcasts from state-of-the-art radio studios known as the former Saint Claire Recording Company Studio in northwestern Lexington at the intersection of Greendale Road and Spurr Road.

WUKY is supported by its listeners, with periodic fundraisers airing during the year. It also receives funding from the university, as well as the Corporation for Public Broadcasting, and its underwriters. WUKY has an effective radiated power (ERP) of 100,000 watts, the maximum for most FM stations in the U.S.

== History ==
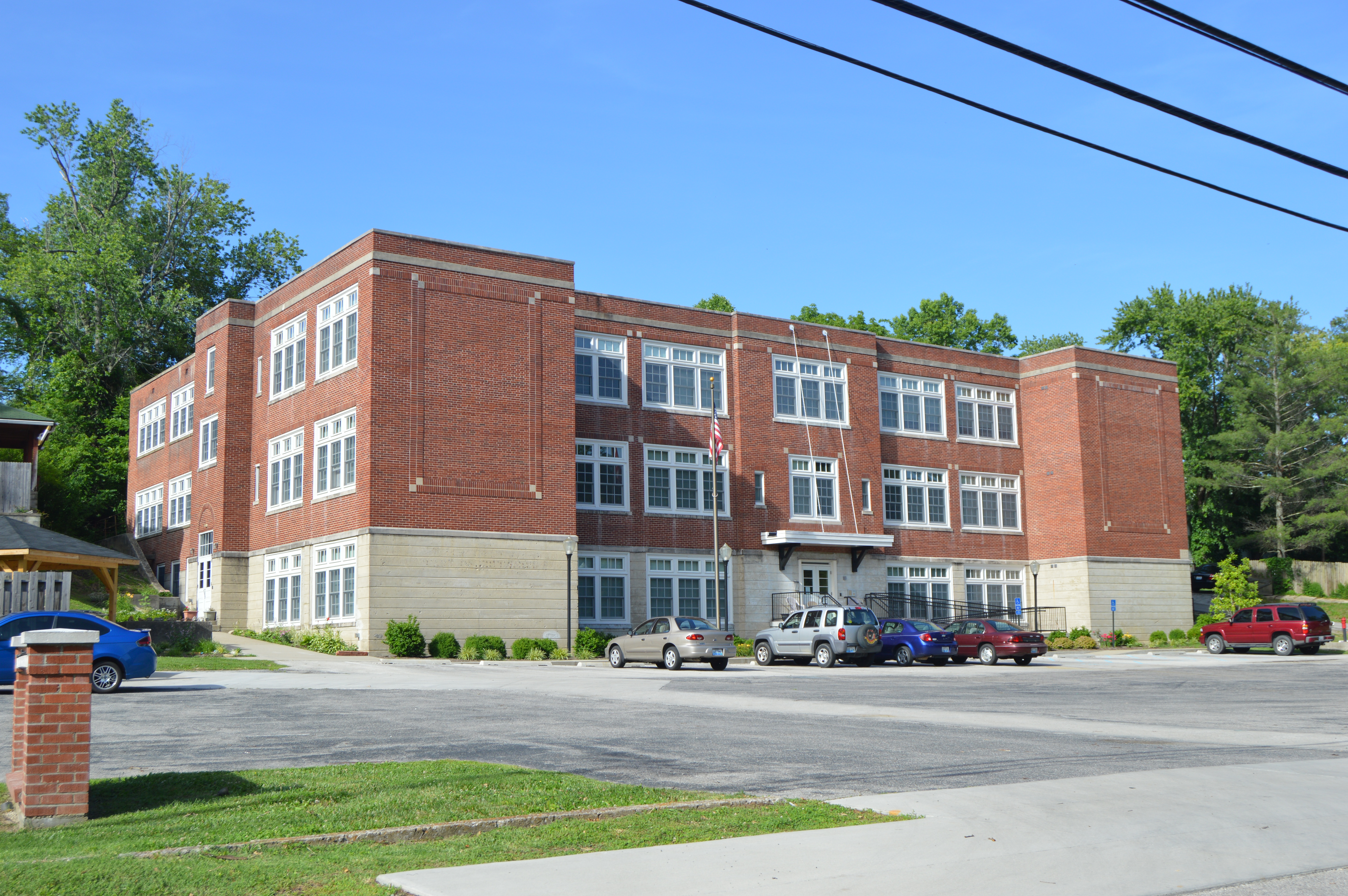
The station's original home office, the former Beattyville Grade School

=== Establishment as AM Apex station WBKY ===
Organized radio broadcasting was introduced in the United States in the early 1920s, and by the mid-1930s the standard AM broadcast band was considered to be too full to allow any meaningful increase in the number of stations. Looking to expand the number of available frequencies, the Federal Communications Commission (FCC) began to issue licenses to parties interested in testing the suitability of using higher transmitting frequencies between roughly 25 and 44 MHz. These stations were informally known as "Apex" stations, due to the tall height of their transmitter antennas, which were needed because coverage was primarily limited to local line-of-sight distances. These original Apex stations operated under experimental licenses, and like standard broadcasting stations used amplitude modulation (AM) transmissions.

In October 1937, the FCC announced a sweeping allocation of frequency assignments that included a band for Apex stations, consisting of 75 channels with 40 kHz separations, and spanning from 41.02 to 43.98 MHz. In addition, in January 1938 the band's first 25 channels, from 41.02 to 41.98 MHz, were reserved for non-commercial educational stations. (Although there had been stations operated by educational institutions on the standard AM band since the early 1920s, there had not been a separate license classification for them.)

WUKY began broadcasting on October 17, 1940, as WBKY, a 100-watt station on 42.90 MHz in Beattyville. The original program director was Ruth Foxx Newborg, and from the beginning the station was owned by University of Kentucky. Its primary mission was to serve rural schools, and at its start the schedule was limited to noon to 2:00 p.m. on weekdays. The station soon ran into technical and financial problems, and suspended operations after June 27, 1941.

WBKY was the last of three educational station assignments granted on the Apex band. At the time the Apex band was established the FCC noted that "The Commission at an early date will consider carefully the needs and requirements for high-frequency broadcast stations using both conventional [AM] modulation and frequency modulation". The commission's studies soon found significant advantages to FM transmissions over the Apex AM signals, with sound quality, and especially resistance to interference from static, including from lightning, found to be far superior for FM. In May 1940, the FCC announced the creation of an FM broadcast band, effective January 1, 1941, operating on 40 channels spanning 42–50 MHz, with the first five channels reserved for educational stations. This new assignment also resulted in the elimination of the Apex band, and the Apex stations were informed that they needed to either go silent or convert to FM. The deadline for the switch to FM transmissions was extended for WBKY, and it continued to be authorized for amplitude modulation (AM) transmissions on 42.9 MHz until May 1, 1944.

=== Transfer to FM ===
In June 1944, WBKY was issued permission to move from Beattyville to the Lexington campus of the University of Kentucky. On February 14, 1945, the station was reactivated as an FM station, still transmitting at 42.9 MHz, from its current home at McVey Hall on the university campus.

In July 1945, the FCC announced that, due to interference concerns, it was reallocating the current FM "low band" frequencies to other services, and existing FM band stations would be relocated to 88-106 MHz (later expanded to 108 MHz). WBKY began testing the transmitter for its new assignment of 91.3 MHz in June 1947, although for a time it continued to also broadcast on its original 42.9 MHz frequency in order to ease the transition. In 1948 the station reported that due to the lack of listeners with FM radios, it was on the air for only 6 hours per week, from 7:00 to 9:00 p.m. on Monday, Wednesday and Friday evenings.

WBKY helped create NPR, and was one of the 90 stations that carried the inaugural broadcast of All Things Considered when it debuted in 1971. On October 1, 1989, the station changed its call letters to WUKY, to better reflect its affiliation with the University of Kentucky. Longtime All Things Considered host Noah Adams began his career at WBKY. The station celebrated its 75th anniversary in 2015.

WUKY is one of two full NPR members in the Lexington market, the other being Eastern Kentucky University's WEKU, a fellow NPR charter member based in Richmond. Lexington is one of the smallest markets with two separately owned and programmed NPR member stations.

== Notable staff ==
- O. Leonard Press (Station manager, 1952–1963)
