= Thinkabout (American TV series) =

- Genre: Educational television
- Countries of origin: United States; Canada
- No. of episodes: 60

Production
- Running time: 15 minutes

Original release
- Network: First-run syndication
- Release: 1979 – 1980

Thinkabout, "a cooperative project for acquiring skills essential to learning", is an instructional program for children, produced in 1979 by the Agency for Instructional Television, in association with various contributing television stations in the[United States and Canada. It was distributed to PBS and educational stations across the US and Canada as late as the mid-to-late 1980s. A sequel, Thinkabout II, followed.

The 60 programs produced were aimed for fifth and sixth grade students to understand their learning process in topics as varied as language arts, mathematics, study skills, as well as thinking skills.

Thinkabout was funded by various state and local agencies, including the Exxon Corporation, with additional support from the Corporation for Public Broadcasting, one of very few CPB-funded programs not distributed by PBS.

== Program listing ==
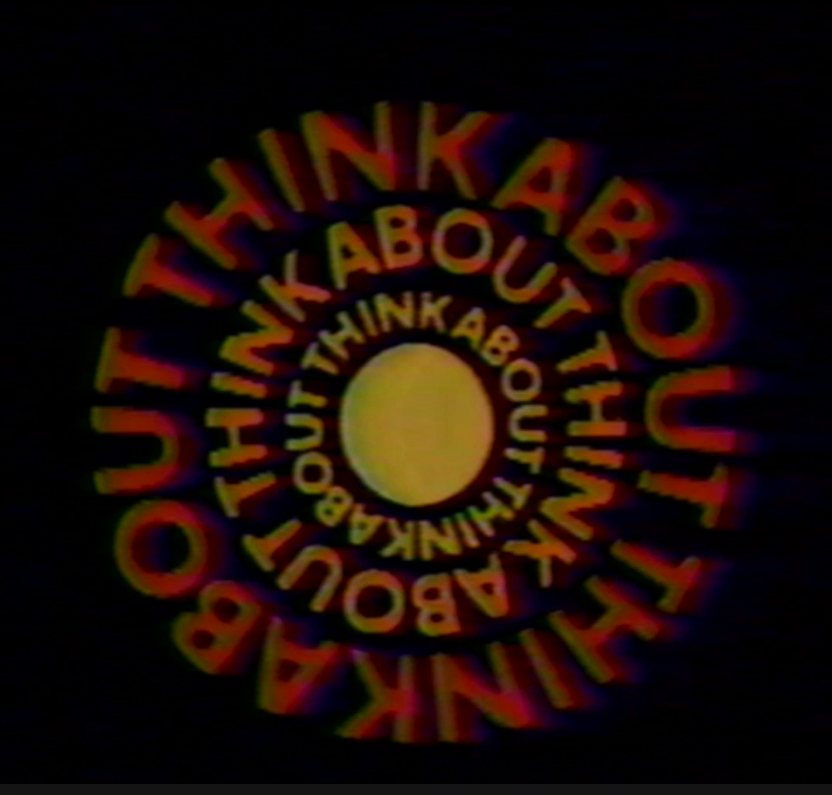
Show logo for Thinkabout which appeared in episode intros.

- 1. Why Bother?
- 2. Brainstorming
- 3. Blockbusting
- 4. You Can Remember
- 5. Estimating
- 6. Approximating
- 7. Using Estimating and Approximation
- 8. Find Your Guide
- 9. What's the Meaning?
- 10. Meaning is More Than Words
- 11. Remember the Audience!
- 12. But, What Does it Mean?
- 13. The Biggest Picture
- 14. Where are You Coming From?
- 15. Make a Present for the Future
- 16. What Do You Know?
- 17. Where Should I Go?
- 18. What Should I Know?
- 19. There are Ways to Remember
- 20. Classfying Objects
- 21. Classfying Information
- 22. People
- 23. There are Many Ways to Go
- 24. People Patterns
- 25. Communication Patterns
- 26. Cultural Patterns
- 27. Nature's Patterns
- 28. Search for the Unknown
- 29. Drawing Conclusions
- 30. Checking Conclusions
- 31. Practice for Success
- 32. One Step at a Time
- 33. Plan Ahead
- 34. Calm Your Jitters!
- 35. What are They?
- 36. Where Do You Get Them?
- 37. How Do You Change That?
- 38. Design a Language
- 39. Symbols
- 40. More Than You Think
- 41. Summarizing
- 42. Using Maps and Models
- 43. Get Ahead with Goals
- 44. Should I Believe?
- 45. What's Important?
- 46. What's Enough?
- 47. Point of View
- 48. Persuasive Techniques
- 49. Make a Deal with Yourself
- 50. Styles of Communication
- 51. Planning a Presentation
- 52. Making a Presentation
- 53. Making Your Point
- 54. Making it Come Alive
- 55. Making Something New
- 56. One Thing Leads to Another
- 57. A Matter of Time
- 58. There's Always a Risk
- 59. Hanging in There
- 60. Plan a City of the Future

== Trivia ==
- During the 1979-1980 school year, AIT partnered with Weekly Reader magazine, in which Weekly Reader included a special Thinkabout feature in their 4th and 5th grade editions.
- This series is unrelated to the 1980s BBC Two program of the same name, which was seen in the 1980s and 1990s; unlike the US series, the British series' focus was on science.
