= Educational Broadband Service =

Microwave TV channel band

The Educational Broadband Service (EBS) was formerly known as the Instructional Television Fixed Service (ITFS). As ITFS, it was a band of twenty microwave TV channels in the United States licensed by the Federal Communications Commission (FCC) to local credit granting educational institutions. It was designed to serve as a means for educational institutions to deliver live or pre-recorded Instructional television to multiple sites within school districts and to higher education branch campuses. In recognition of the variety and quantity of video materials required to support instruction at numerous grade levels and in a range of subjects, licensees were typically granted a group of four channels. Its low capital and operating costs as compared to broadcast television, technical quality that compared favorably with broadcast television, and its multi-channel per licensees feature made ITFS an extremely cost effective vehicle for the delivery of Educational television materials.

The FCC changed the name of this service to the Educational Broadband Service (EBS) and changed the allocation so each licensee would not have four 6 MHz wide channels but instead would have one 6 MHz channel and one 15 MHz wide "channel" (three contiguous 5 MHz channels). There are currently several hundred EBS systems in operation delivering schedules of live and pre-recorded instruction.

== History ==
=== Initial FCC authorization ===
The FCC initially authorized ITFS, in 1963, to operate using a one-way, analog, line-of-sight technology. Typical installations included up to four transmitters multiplexed through a single broadcast antenna with directional receive antennas at each receive site. Receive site installations included equipment to down convert the microwave channels for viewing on standard television receivers. In typical installations, the down converted ITFS signals were distributed to classrooms over multi-channel closed-circuit television systems.

=== FCC allows leasing ===
In the late 1970s the FCC recognized that many ITFS licensees lacked the technical expertise and/or the financial means to make more effective use of ITFS. Subsequently, the FCC authorized ITFS licensees to lease a portion of their spectrum, designated as “Excess Capacity," for commercial use, meaning ITFS licensees were required to retain forty hours per week per channel for daytime instruction with the excess nighttime hours available for commercial use in exchange for technical and financial support for their instructional service.

So, primarily in large markets, subscription premium television such as HBO, Showtime, The Movie Channel and others could be transmitted over these same microwave stations beginning at 4 PM when school was out, and continuing throughout the evening, sometimes until the wee hours. In those days, pay-TV did not broadcast during the day, so there was no interference between one type of television programming and the next.

Only after ITFS had migrated to other formats did the daytime hours of the service become available to subscription television providers which filled the hours with programming such as the five-hour-long children's show Pinwheel airing weekday mornings on Nickelodeon or long blocks of international cartoons for which the rights thereto remained in the pennies per subscriber throughout the run of the technology.

== Subsequent development ==
Using ITFS excess capacity and up to thirteen channels in the companion commercial service, the Multichannel Multipoint Distribution Service (MMDS), a number of telecommunications companies built wireless cable systems. The number of available channels, however, proved to be insufficient to compete effectively with the expanding channel capacity of cable TV.

ITFS and MMDS licensees then sought FCC authorization to employ digital compression technology, which would substantively increase the number of program streams that could be carried on the channels of the combined ITFS and MMDS spectrum.

=== Two-way operation added ===
In 1998, the FCC approved the use of digital compression in ITFS. At the time digital compression technology was expected to expand the number of program steams by a ratio of 4 to 1 or more. The FCC also authorized both cellular and two-way operations in the ITFS/MMDS services and the potential for ITFS to be used for the distribution of data, as well as video. In the same rule, the FCC reduced the capacity that educational licensees were required to retain for instruction from forty hours per week per channel to 5% of channel capacity. In permitting two-way operations the FCC created the first potential for a substantial use of instructional materials that rely on interaction between the instructional program and learners.

The expanded programming capacity provided by digital video compression encouraged a number of commercial entities to create wireless entertainment video systems. These systems found, however, that the additional programming capability was not sufficient to overcome the line-of-sight handicap and the associated higher cost for customer installations. It was clear that while video distribution was a viable educational service for ITFS, commercial video services could not be widely successful in the ITFS/Multichannel Multipoint Distribution Service (MMDS) spectrum.

=== Telecommunications interest in ITFS spectrum ===
In 1999, telecommunication interests associated with the cell phone industry sought to obtain FCC approval for the transfer of portions of the ITFS spectrum from educational use to support a proposed 3G (Third Generation) cell phone technology. In 2001, the FCC ruled to preserve the ITFS spectrum for education and further modified the rules to authorize the use of the spectrum in mobile operations and voice communications.

These changes in rule and the rising demand for broadband communications led to several commercial tests of combined ITFS/MMDS digital systems designed for two-way data distribution. It was believed that these wireless systems could provide a high-speed data connection that would compete effectively with DSL and cable modem services in providing access to the Internet. Such systems would also have the capacity to distribute video and voice in the form of data. These tests were, subsequently, halted as it became apparent that the existing technology and cost structures could not sustain commercial operations.

During the same period a new technology, Non-line-of-sight (NLOS), was in development and testing by a number of technology companies. NLOS showed promise of overcoming the obstacles of line-of-sight and high customer installation costs that had handicapped ITFS/MMDS operations. That improvement, however, was not judged to be sufficient to ensure that a combined ITFS/MMDS digital service could satisfy the needs of education, as well as providing technology sufficiently robust to be commercially viable.

=== FCC approves wireless networking uses ===
In 2003 the National ITFS Association, the CatholicTV Network, and the Wireless Communications Association filed a joint proposal with the FCC to reformat the ITFS/MMDS spectrum and to provide rules, which would support widespread development of a wireless broadband service in the ITFS/MMDS spectrum. Some school boards provide their students with internet access via this spectrum.

=== FCC publishes major revisions of the BRS/EBS band ===
In July 2019 the FCC published "Transforming the 2.5 GHz Band" substantially changing the BRS and EBS band licenses and use. Principal aspects addressed were a removal of the educational requirements for use and ownership of EBS licenses, new lease terms, changes in license coverage, new white space licenses, a future spectrum auction, and a priority window for Native American tribes to apply for new licenses that cover Indian lands.

== WISPs using EBS ==
Cellular phone pioneer Craig McCaw's Clearwire Wireless Internet Service Provider (WISP) leased EBS from the non-profit Broadcast license holder in many US cities.

WCO Spectrum, in 2023, has been approaching schools offering to purchase 2.5GHz spectrum in the EBS to create maximum value for license holders.

== See also ==
- Agency for Instructional Technology
- Cable in the Classroom
- Educational television
- Instructional television
- National Association of Educational Broadcasters
- Non-commercial educational
