= WKPC-TV =

Television station in Louisville, Kentucky

Satellite of WKLE, Lexington, Kentucky
- Louisville, Kentucky; United States
- Channels: Digital: 30 (UHF); Virtual: 15
- Branding: KET

Programming
- Network: Kentucky Educational Television
- Affiliations: 15.1: KET/PBS; for others, see § Subchannels

Ownership
- Owner: Kentucky Authority for Educational Television
- Sister stations: WKMJ-TV

History
- First air date: September 5, 1958
- Former call signs: WFPK-TV (1958–1969)
- Former channel numbers: Analog: 15 (UHF, 1958–2009); Digital: 17 (UHF, 1999–2019)
- Former affiliations: NET (1958–1970)
- Call sign meaning: Kentuckiana People's Choice

Technical information
- Licensing authority: FCC
- Facility ID: 21432
- ERP: 58 kW
- HAAT: 266.1 m (873 ft)
- Transmitter coordinates: 38°22′1″N 85°49′54″W

Links
- Public license information: Public file; LMS
- Website: www.ket.org

WKPC-TV (channel 15) is a PBS member television station in Louisville, Kentucky, United States. Owned by the Kentucky Authority for Educational Television, it is operated as part of the statewide Kentucky Educational Television (KET) network. WKPC-TV's transmitter (like those belonging to several other Louisville stations, including sister WKMJ-TV) is located at the Kentuckiana Tower Farm at Floyds Knobs, in Floyd County, Indiana. WKPC and WKMJ are the only KET-owned stations whose transmitters are outside Kentucky's borders.

Prior to 1997, WKPC-TV was a free-standing public television station, Kentucky's first.

== History ==
=== Early years ===
The Louisville Free Public Library, which had ventured into broadcasting in 1950 with the launch of FM radio station WFPL, followed by WFPK four years later, was granted a construction permit on January 3, 1958, for a noncommercial educational television station to operate on channel 15 in Louisville. WFPK-TV began broadcasts on September 5, 1958, with a test program, followed the next Monday by the commencement of classes for more than 7,000 students in high schools in Louisville, Jefferson County, and two counties in southern Indiana. That first year, programs originated from the facilities of commercial station WAVE-TV.

In 1967, the public library transferred the station, which by that time had joined National Educational Television, to the school system of Jefferson County. Two years later, in 1969, as a condition of the sale and to avoid confusion with the library's radio stations, WFPK-TV changed its call letters to WKPC-TV. That year also brought a major technical improvement for channel 15. In May, ground was broken on a new tower in Floyds Knobs, using land owned by WAVE-TV, as part of a power increase. That new tower would also bring another television station to Kentuckiana in 1970, as the Kentucky Authority for Educational Television leased space to side-mount an antenna for its new KET transmitter, WKMJ-TV; Louisville had received poorer-than-expected service from the original statewide transmitter configuration in the two years after KET signed on the air.

=== Community ownership ===
As the 1970s progressed, the Jefferson County school system cut back on its use of instructional television over WKPC-TV. In 1975, a regional chamber of commerce task force recommended that operation of the station be transferred to a nonprofit community group; the next year, the school board contemplated selling the station but opted instead to keep it. The board's decision not to sell prompted a competing applicant, Metropolitan Louisville Public Television, Inc. (MLPTV), to file for channel 15 as well, mutually exclusive with a renewal for WKPC-TV.

In late 1980, a new corporation, Fifteen Telecommunications, Inc., was formed among three factions that had sought control of the station and with the blessing of MLPTV, which promised to drop its license challenge if the school board transferred the license to Fifteen. The school board relinquished control of WKPC-TV in 1981.

The new licensee had a tall task ahead. The station had accrued enough problems that PBS, in an unusual occurrence, went so far as to convene a special task force in Louisville to sort them out; the task force recommended the station shed its "elitist and remote" image, increase its income to bolster its finances, and attract new viewers. A new general manager, John-Robert Curtin, was hired in late 1982 from KYVE-TV in Yakima, Washington, which had similarly split from a school board to become a community-organized station; he succeeded the station's original manager, Jerry Weaver, who had served under three different license-holders. Curtin cut more than half the staff and began to try and turn around the station, which had heavily borrowed funds to just stay in operation.

The new leadership also attempted to resolve a problem that had been present for nearly 15 years in the form of the duplication of certain PBS programs with KET. Despite an early deal, the two public television entities could not reach an arrangement, and the problem persisted.

By the late 1980s, WKPC had turned itself around enough that it had outgrown the studio built for it nearly 20 years prior by the Jefferson County school board. However, the mid-1990s saw a rapid reversal of fortunes, largely due to Fifteen Telecommunications' attempts to build on that momentum of success. The station moved into a former General Electric facility not far from its previous studios, borrowing $2.1 million to make the purchase; it also sprouted a string of for-profit subsidiaries, such as Team One, which provided production and teleconferencing services. However, the new ventures, designed to brace for potential cuts to federal support of public broadcasting, caused expenses to soar, and the station was unable to attract tenants to fill the rest of the 103,000-square-foot (9,600 m^{2}) building. By late 1996, WKPC-TV had accrued $4 million in debts. Tom Dorsey, television and radio writer for The Courier-Journal, noted that "it was always too busy paying the bills to do much local programming".

=== Merger with KET ===
The worsening financial situation prompted station leaders in April 1996 to begin pursuing a merger with KET, a consolidation that would end all duplication between WKPC and KET in Louisville by turning WKPC into the primary KET service for the metropolitan area. An agreement was reached in December 1996, by which KET acquired certain technical assets, including the land to the Floyds Knobs tower it still shared with WKPC-TV, and the license. The building was sold to WHAS radio and today houses that and iHeartMedia's other Louisville stations.

On July 1, 1997, KET's main programming moved to WKPC-TV. WKMJ-TV simultaneously suspended operations for a transmitter overhaul; it returned a month later at increased power, carrying a new service called KET2, which initially featured additional children's programs, adult education programming and local productions. Outside of Louisville, KET2 was seen on cable systems statewide. For viewers in the rest of Kentucky, the merger brought several schedule changes, as KET shuffled its lineup to accommodate some programs that it did not air but which channel 15 had broadcast before ceasing independent operations.

== Technical information ==
WKPC-TV's digital signal, WKPC-DT, was the first KET transmitter to broadcast in digital and Kentucky's first digital television station. On August 19, 1999, the station's digital signal was activated by then-governor Paul E. Patton during the opening ceremonies of that year's Kentucky State Fair.

=== Subchannels ===
The station's digital signal is multiplexed:

Subchannels of WKPC-TV
Subchannel	Res.	Short name	Programming
15.1	720p	KET	PBS
15.3	480i	KET KY	Kentucky Channel
15.4	480i	KETKIDS	PBS Kids
68.1	720p	KET2	KET2 (WKMJ-TV)

Broadcast on behalf of another station

=== Analog-to-digital conversion ===
On April 16, 2009, WKPC-TV turned off its analog signal over UHF channel 15 as part of the mandatory analog-to-digital television transition of 2009. The station's digital signal remained on its pre-transition UHF channel 17, using virtual channel 15.

WKPC-TV was repacked to channel 30 in phase 6 of the clearing of the 600 MHz band.

== See also ==
- Kentucky Educational Television
  - List of programs broadcast by Kentucky Educational Television
