= O. Leonard Press =

American radio and television executive (1921–2019)

- Born: November 10, 1921; Lowell, Massachusetts, United States
- Died: July 31, 2019; Lexington, Kentucky, United States
- Education: Boston University
- Occupations: Television broadcaster; Television producer; Radio broadcaster; College professor; Network executive
- Years active: 1952–1991
- Spouse: Lilian Henken Press (m. 1947)
- Children: Lowell Press

O. Leonard Press (November 10, 1921 – July 31, 2019), also known simply as Len Press, was a radio and television broadcaster, producer, and college professor. He is best known for envisioning a state network of educational television stations in the U.S. state of Kentucky. Born and raised in Boston, Massachusetts, Press is mainly known as the founder and creator of the Kentucky Educational Television (KET) network.

== Broadcasting and teaching careers ==
Before moving to Kentucky, Press had developed the National Press Club's weekly radio broadcast, which went on to run for about 50 years. He also produced radio and television advertising spots for his alma mater, Boston University, following his reception of his master's degree in communications in 1951.

Upon arriving as a professor at the University of Kentucky in 1952, Press also became the head of the university's radio broadcasting department, which has been operating WBKY radio (91.3 MHz, now WUKY), the oldest educational FM radio station in the United States, for much of its life on the air. In addition to managing WBKY until 1963, his first Kentucky-based production was a holiday-themed program called Christmas in the Mountains for Louisville's WHAS radio. Press also filmed Kentucky Wildcats men's basketball games for then-head coach Adolph Rupp during the mid- to late-1950s.

While teaching at the university, Press, along with two of his colleagues, went into consideration of founding and starting an educational television station that would originate at the university. The motivation came from the fact that his production of an anthropology telecourse, one of the nation's first-ever telecourses, that aired on Boston's then-NBC affiliate WBZ-TV (now a CBS Owned-and-operated station) in the mid-1950s had positive reviews. That, and another telecourse, had positive reviews across the nation, including one that appeared in Variety magazine.

=== Creating the network ===
The attempt to start a university-based television station failed for Press, but he and his colleagues decided to envision and create something bigger; a multi-station statewide educational television network to serve the entire Commonwealth of Kentucky, inspired by pre-existing statewide ETV networks in Alabama, Georgia and both Carolinas. His intention was for the network to air simultaneously through more than a dozen separate television stations throughout the state, including in areas that were not served over-the-air by any commercial television stations at the time. The inspiration of creating the network was realized by Press when he visited areas of eastern Kentucky; for example, during that trip, he learned of the fact that the Knott County-based Lott's Creek Community School, which has since been renamed Cordia School, had no accreditation, nor did they ever receive state funds, from that school's founder and then-director Alice Stone.

Press spent more than a decade traveling throughout the state of Kentucky to pitch his idea of a statewide network, starting with his address to the Rotary Club in Frankfort, which spawned a news story that was published in an early 1959 edition of The Courier-Journal in Louisville. Press then received support from officials from the University of Kentucky, and then a short meeting with then-Kentucky Governor Bert T. Combs turned into a proposal to start the ETV network in Kentucky, which led to a study on a feasibility for such a network. In 1962, Press was appointed as executive director of the Kentucky Authority for Educational Television when the proposal passed legislation by the Kentucky General Assembly. Three years later in 1965, Ashland Oil founder Paul G. Blazer personally acquired the first thirteen transmitter sites needed for the network, and donated them to the Authority. This resulted in including the state network being included in the state budget for the 1968 fiscal year. O. Leonard Press' dream of a statewide educational television network had become reality on September 23, 1968, when the Kentucky Educational Television network, initially broadcast over eight UHF stations, signed on the air for the first time. Louie B. Nunn, who had won the 1967 gubatorial election, pressed the button to put the network on the air, and then dedicated the network that same day. Within the next thirteen years, six more stations, including the mid-1970s acquisition of failed commercial independent station WDXR-TV (channel 29, now WKPD) in Paducah, plus the addition of at least six low-power translators signed on to become part of the network. The 1979 sign-on of WKOH (channel 31) in Owensboro made the network's programming available on 15 full-power stations across the state. Press served as the network's executive director for a total of 23 years, spanning from the network's 1968 inception until his retirement on June 30, 1991. His longtime colleague, Virginia Gaines Fox, took over as executive director for 12 years afterward.

=== After retirement ===
In 1992, KET's recently expanded network center and production facility in Lexington was dedicated to Press by being named the O. Leonard Press Telecommunications Center. That same year, Press was also interviewed and profiled in the series finale of KET's in-house produced occasional interview program, Distinguished Kentuckian. On the occasion of the network's 50th anniversary in 2018, he would attend the unveiling of an historical marker, which was placed in front of the network's studio facilities by the Kentucky Historical Society.

== Other interests ==
During the 1990s and the early 2000s, Press served as a member of the Shakertown Roundtable advisory board at the Shaker Village at Pleasant Hill.

== Awards and honors ==
On February 12, 2013, per Kentucky House of Representatives' House Resolution 79 and Kentucky Senate Resolution 92, Press was awarded the 2012 Vic Hellard Jr. Award for excellence in public Service from the Kentucky Legislative Research Commission.

In May 2015, Lenonard and Lillian Press received honorary doctorate degrees from the University of Kentucky as part of its graduation commencement ceremony.

== Personal life ==
In 1947, Press married his wife, Lilian, as a graduate student at the Boston University College of Communications. They had one son, Lowell Press.

Press died at the age of 97 on July 31, 2019, at Central Baptist Hospital in Lexington. His memorial service was held at the O. Leonard Press Telecommunications Center on September 20. The full memorial service can be viewed at KET's website. In April 2020, his wife, Lilian, died at age 95 due to complications from COVID-19.

== See also ==
- Kentucky Educational Television

== Bibliography ==
=== Books ===
- Press, O. Leonard (2008). The KET Story: A Personal Account. Lexington, Kentucky: The Clark Group. ISBN 978-1-883589-89-9.

Preceded by None	Executive director of Kentucky Educational Television; 1962–1991	Succeeded by Virginia Gaines Fox
