= WKPD =

Television station in Paducah, Kentucky

Satellite of WKLE, Lexington, Kentucky
- Paducah, Kentucky; United States
- Channels: Digital: 23 (UHF); Virtual: 29
- Branding: KET

Programming
- Network: Kentucky Educational Television
- Affiliations: 29.1: KET/PBS; for others, see § Subchannels

Ownership
- Owner: Kentucky Authority for Educational Television

History
- First air date: May 31, 1971
- Former call signs: WDXR-TV (1971–1978)
- Former channel numbers: Analog: 29 (UHF, 1971–2009); Digital: 41 (UHF, 2002–2019)
- Former affiliations: Independent (1971–1975)
- Call sign meaning: Kentucky Paducah

Technical information
- Licensing authority: FCC
- Facility ID: 65758
- ERP: 90 kW
- HAAT: 159 m (522 ft)
- Transmitter coordinates: 37°5′40″N 88°40′20″W

Links
- Public license information: Public file; LMS
- Website: www.ket.org

WKPD (channel 29) is a PBS member television station licensed to Paducah, Kentucky, United States. Owned by the Kentucky Authority for Educational Television, the station is operated as part of the statewide Kentucky Educational Television (KET) network. WKPD's transmitter is located on Coleman Road off of KY 305 on the west side of Paducah, near the McCracken County Soccer Complex.

== History ==
=== WDXR-TV ===
On May 27, 1966, E. Weaks McKinney-Smith and George T. Bailey, doing business as Channel 29, filed with the Federal Communications Commission (FCC) for a construction permit to build a new commercial television on channel 29 at Paducah, which was granted by the FCC on January 30, 1967. The station took the call letters WDXR-TV; Smith and Bailey were the owners of Paducah radio station WDXR.

In 1968, Smith and Bailey bought land at the corner of Kentucky Avenue and 4th Street in downtown Paducah for a new building to house WDXR radio and television. Construction on the facility began in the summer of 1969; while the building was finished early the next year, it was not until December 1970 that the station announced a planned launch date for April 1, 1971, and programming focused on the Paducah area.

Channel 29 began telecasting May 31, 1971, as an independent station. Programming offerings initially included two daily newscasts. It also aired syndicated programming and local sports telecasts, as well as a local church service.

Tragedy struck WDXR radio and television on February 21, 1974, when Weaks McKinney-Smith died in a New York City hospital at the age of 49, nearly a month after suffering a heart attack on a business trip to try to affiliate the station with ABC, which was already seen in parts of the market from Harrisburg, Illinois-licensed WSIL-TV (channel 3). With Weaks's death and Bailey selling his shares later that year, the station became 100 percent owned by Lady Sarah McKinney-Smith.

On October 22, 1975, at 12 midnight Central time, WDXR-TV suspended operations after going bankrupt. A week later, the station issued a two-sentence statement confirming that it had asked the FCC to remain silent. No reason was given, but a representative of the church, when he visited the station to ask about the suspension, saw men from RCA carting away equipment.

=== As a KET transmitter ===
In November 1975, Kentucky Educational Television (KET) commissioned a study that reported that the establishment of new transmitters to serve Paducah and Owensboro a high priority. Parts of the Jackson Purchase area received a signal from WKMU (channel 21), the network's transmitter that is licensed to Murray, but without specially designed antenna setups, as local schools had, the public could not receive a consistent clear signal. KET filed for the channel directly, only to discover that the WDXR-TV license was still active.

Lady Sarah sold the WDXR-TV building, though without any television production equipment (which had been removed), to J. Spencer Solomon, owner of a production firm in Benton, in September 1976. A lengthy courtship for facilities and the worse nature of the signal gap in the Owensboro area threatened to cost Paducah its shot at having a KET transmitter. However, in January 1977, a deal was reached to donate the WDXR-TV license to KET.

The FCC approved the license transfer on January 30, 1978. KET, however, opted not to use the former tower of WDXR-TV near Melber and instead pressed forward with plans to build at a site owned by the McCracken County government. The new tower, located on Coleman Road, would also provide facilities to the state early warning system, and would cost $1 a year instead of $26,000 to buy the WDXR-TV tower site. Construction on WKPD, as the transmitter was renamed, was delayed by a backlog of state projects; the station returned to the air on September 9, 1979, as the 14th KET transmitter.

== Coverage area ==
Although WKPD covers most of the same areas of the Purchase region as WKMU except for Fulton County, WKPD's signal can also be received in areas of the region where WKMU cannot. Examples include parts of Ballard County, as well as areas of southernmost Illinois and parts of Mississippi County in southeast Missouri. WKPD's signal coverage extends from Charleston, Missouri, to Cairo, Illinois. The WKPD signal is received as far east as Eddyville, as far south as Mayfield near WKMU's tower, and as far north as northern Johnson and Pope counties in Illinois.

=== Cable and satellite carriage ===
Since 2003, the main channel of WKPD is available on DirecTV and Dish Network satellite television in the entirety of the Paducah–Cape Girardeau market, including the customers who live on the Illinois or Missouri sides of the market, and the Paducah market's two other principal cities of Cape Girardeau, Missouri, and Harrisburg, Illinois. All cable television providers in the Kentucky segment of the media market provide at least the main channel of the network. WSIU-TV is mostly carried on cable in the Illinois and Missouri segments of the market.

== Technical information ==
=== Subchannels ===
The station's digital signal is multiplexed:

Subchannels of WKPD
Channel	Res.	Short name	Programming
29.1	720p	KET	PBS
29.2	720p	KET2	KET2
29.3	480i	KET KY	Kentucky Channel
29.4	480i	KETKIDS	PBS Kids

=== Analog-to-digital conversion ===
WKPD-TV shut down its analog signal over UHF channel 29 in compliance with the 2009 digital television transition. Although the mandatory deadline was June 12, 2009, after the DTV Delay Act pushed back the deadline from February 17, the analog signal was shut down on April 16. The station's digital signal remained on its pre-transition UHF channel 41, using virtual channel 29.

WKPD moved its digital signal to UHF channel 23 as part of the network's participation in the 2016–17 FCC spectrum incentive auction.

== See also ==
- Kentucky Educational Television
