= Instructional television =

Use of audiovisual broadcasts in distance education

Instructional television (ITV) is the use of television programs for distance education. Educational television programs on instructional television may be less than one half hour long (generally 15 minutes in length) to help their integration into the classroom setting. These shows are often accompanied by teachers' guides that include material to help use this program in lessons. Instructional television programs in the United States have historically been shown during the daytime on Public Broadcasting Service (PBS) stations. However, in the 21st century fewer public television stations devote their airtime to ITV than in the past, ITV programs are either seen on a digital subchannel of non-commercial educational public television station, or on a local educational-access television channel run by a public, educational, and government access (PEG) cable TV organization.

Instructional television in the United States has been granted 20 microwave channels, administered by local educational institutions, through a service known as ITFS, or Instructional Television Fixed Service. Instructional television may also be programmed on terrestrial television stations.

== See also ==
- Agency for Instructional Technology -- ITV program distributor
- Annenberg Foundation (Annenberg Channel)
- Washington County Closed-Circuit Educational Television Project
- William M. Brish, a leader of closed circuit instructional television in public school elementary classrooms.
- Educational films
- Educational television
