= NTN Buzztime =

Entertainment company

NTN Buzztime, Inc.
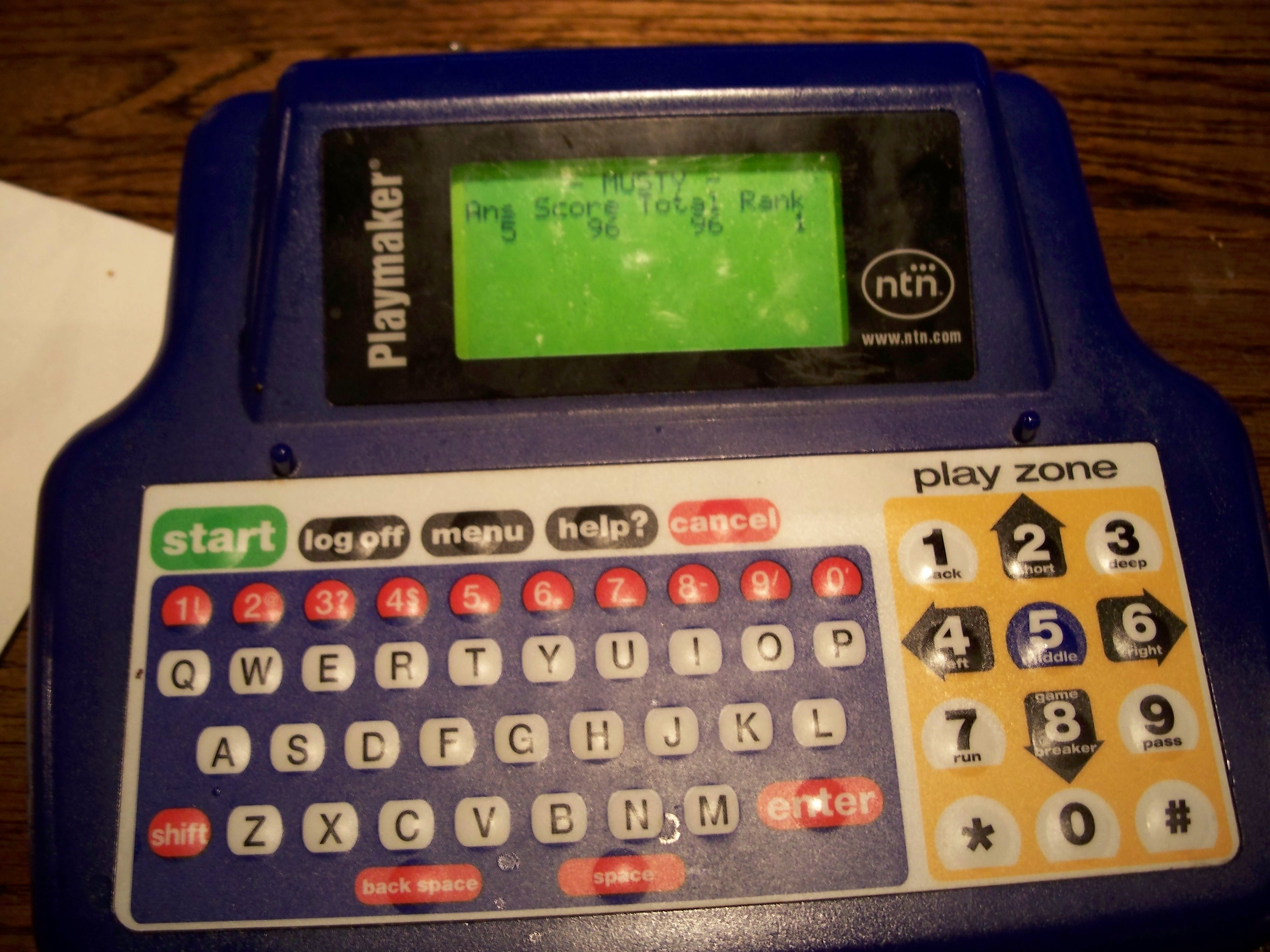
- Type: Private
- Industry: Interactive entertainment
- Founded: 1983
- Headquarters: Carlsbad, California
- Key people: Aram Fuchs, CEO and Owner
- Number of employees: 136
- Website: www.buzztime.com/business

NTN Buzztime is a company that produces interactive entertainment across many different platforms. Its most well-known product, simply called Buzztime, and formerly known as the NTN Network, since 1985, broadcasts trivia and other games via broadband over a national network to over 3,800 bars and restaurants in the United States, Canada and the Caribbean. Operations in the UK were discontinued in 2008. Typically, independently owned bars and restaurants offer Buzztime. It is, however, offered by each outlet of two major U.S. chains, Buffalo Wild Wings and Damon's Grill. As of August 2021, Buffalo Wild Wings only carries Buzztime in 7 U.S. locations in 5 different states. It is also carried at limited T.G.I. Friday's and Applebee's locations. Buzztime offers several different kinds of trivia games based on a variety of subjects, including pop culture, entertainment, world history, geography, sports and music, as well as general trivia games with questions in many categories.

NTN Buzztime, Inc. is based in Carlsbad, California. The company was founded as Alroy Industries and formerly went by the name NTN Communications, Inc. from 1985 to 2005.

== Other products ==
In 1988, NTN Buzztime began outfitting Kentucky school districts with interactive keypads, in cooperation with Kentucky Educational Television, as a part of a new satellite program delivery program, eventually taking form as the KET Star Channels. The use of the technology itself being inspired by Buzztime technology being used in a Lexington bar as part of a football play prediction game. The first Star Channels course, on statistics and probability, was taught in January 1989 to 24 Kentucky high schools and another 41 high schools in 16 states. The program was then rolled out statewide in the wake of the Kentucky Supreme Court finding the state's education system unconstitutional. Star Channels attracted international attention, including delegations from China and Kuwait.

NTN Buzztime also used to produce a variety of wireless paging products, the most common example being a device that vibrates when a food order is ready. The wireless product division was sold in 2006.

NTN Buzztime also once produced and distributed ProHost Seating and Reservations Software for managing door and floor operations in Restaurants, Casinos, Theme Parks, Hotels, in its Arlington, TX office- known as "Software Solutions". Signature customers include Harrah's Entertainment, MGM Mirage, Universal Studios and Hard Rock Cafe. The software solutions division was sold by NTN Buzztime, Inc. in 2007 to ESP Digital Media.

== Lawsuits ==
In 1997, a complaint was filed charging NTN for devising an "exit strategy" that would provide certain defendants with millions of dollars of compensation upon their resignation. In 2000, a settlement of $3,250,000 was approved.

In January 2008, the company filed a legal suit, in the Southern District of California against Sony Computer Entertainment, alleging that Sony had violated several of its trademarks. The suit accused Sony of a "malicious, fraudulent, knowing, wilful, and deliberate" violation of its trademarks. In the suit, Buzztime sought the recall and destruction of all infringing products and asked the court for actual damages, punitive damages, legal fees and an order to the US Patent and Trademark Office not to register Sony's then pending Buzz! trademarks. The case was eventually settled out of court in favor of Sony.
