= Agency for Instructional Technology =

Former US distributor of educational television programs

The Agency for Instructional Technology (AIT) was a non-profit organization in the United States that produced, sold and distributed educational and instructional television programs, and other multimedia materials, to schools in the United States and Canada.

Many of AIT's programs were produced in association with other producers and television stations, and were funded by various state, provincial and local educational-related agencies, with additional support from various corporate sponsors and philanthropical organisations.

AIT was based in Bloomington, Indiana and was founded by Edwin George Cohen.

== History ==
AIT was first founded in 1962 as the National Instructional Television Library (NIT), an agency funded by the U.S. Office of Education and operated by National Educational Television in New York City. NIT was founded as a way to distribute instructional television programming and associated materials to educational television stations throughout the US.

In 1965, NIT would part ways with NET and relocate to its present home in Bloomington, Indiana, where it became the National Center for School and College Television (NCSCT). The NCSCT was operated by the Indiana University Foundation.

In 1968, the service was renamed the National Instructional Television Center (NIT). NIT would become an independent, self-supporting non-profit organisation in 1970, and would begin distribution of children's educational programming to PBS, the successor to NIT's former operator, NET.

On April 11, 1973, NIT would be incorporated into the Agency for Instructional Television (AIT). It would slightly change its name to Agency for Instructional Technology on July 1, 1984, to reflect other uses to electronically distribute instructional material, such as via videocassette and computer.

AIT stopped producing new content in 2011, and officially ceased operations in 2015. The archives of the AIT are now part of the collection of the Indiana University Libraries Moving Image Archive; many of AIT's programs can be viewed online through the Indiana University website.
