= List of documentary programs formerly distributed by American Public Television =

The following is a list of documentary programs formerly distributed to public television stations (including PBS affiliates) through American Public Television. There is a separate list for current, upcoming and unreleased programming.

== Documentary series ==
Legend
| ^{APT WORLDWIDE} | Also on APT Worldwide |
| ^{CREATE} | Also on Create |
| ^{HDTV} | High-definition television |
| ^{ITVS} | Funded and distributed by Independent Television Service |
| ^{LPB} | Funded and distributed by Latino Public Broadcasting |
| ^{NHK} | Funded and distributed by NHK (Japan Broadcasting Corporation) |
| ^{VMM} | Funded and distributed by Vision Maker Media (formerly Native American Public Broadcasting Consortium and Native American Public Telecommunications) |
| ^{WORLD} | Also on WORLD |

=== Documentary ===
==== 1970s ====
| Title | Premiere date | End date | Note(s) | Legend(s) | Source(s) |
|---|---|---|---|---|---|
| The Watergate Hearings | May 17, 1973 | November 15, 1973 | | | |
| The Ascent of Man | January 7, 1975 | January 6, 1977 | | | |
| The Ascent of Man | January 7, 1978 | January 6, 1979 | | | |
| The Ascent of Man | September 1, 1979 | August 31, 1981 | | | |
| Great Parks of the World | December 26, 1976 | December 25, 1986 | | | |
| World War II: G.I. Diary | September 10, 1978 | September 9, 1989 | (Note: Also known as G.I. Diary.) | | |

==== 1980s ====
| Title | Premiere date | End date | Note(s) | Legend(s) | Source(s) |
|---|---|---|---|---|---|
| U.S. Chronicle | June 30, 1980 | June 29, 1984 | (Note: hosted by Jim Lehrer.) | | |
| Ireland: A Television History | April 9, 1982 | April 8, 1988 | | | |
| Horses | October 1, 1987 | September 30, 1989 | | | |

==== 1990s ====
| Title | Premiere date | End date | Note(s) | Legend(s) | Source(s) |
|---|---|---|---|---|---|
| Spaceship Earth: A Global Geography | October 27, 1991 | October 26, 1994 | (Note: Originally titled Spaceship Earth.) | | |
| Blood and Belonging | January 1, 1994 | December 31, 1995 | (Note: Two-part series.) | | |
| The New Workplace | April 1, 1994 | March 31, 1998 | | | |
| Victory at Sea | June 1, 1994 | December 31, 1995 | | | |
| Apollo 11: As It Happened | July 1, 1994 | July 31, 1995 | | | |
| The Hermitage: A Russian Odyssey | September 4, 1994 | September 3, 1997 | (Note: Three-part series.) | | |
| The Visionaries | September 1, 1995 | May 31, 2002 | (Note: Distributed by NETA (aka National Educational Telecommunications Association) in season 9-19.) | | |
| Flight to Freedom | September 1, 1995 | August 31, 2010 | | | |
| In Search of the Dead | December 1, 1995 | November 30, 1997 | | | |
| Fat Man in France: A Journey With Tom Vernon | December 21, 1995 | December 20, 1998 | | | |
| The 3,000 Mile Garden | December 21, 1995 | December 31, 1999 | | | |
| Scandinavia | January 12, 1996 | January 11, 2000 | (Note: hosted by Walter Cronkite.) | | |
| Rights & Wrongs: Human Rights Television | April 1, 1996 | November 30, 1997 | (Note: Distributed by PBS from 1993 to 1996.) | ^{ITVS} | |
| The Olympia | July 1, 1996 | December 31, 1997 | | | |
| One World | February 27, 1998 | November 30, 2000 | | ^{APT WORLDWIDE} | |
| Cinema Europe: The Other Hollywood | March 1, 1998 | February 29, 2000 | | | |
| Exploring Your Brain | March 29, 1998 | March 30, 2012 | (Note: Originally nature & science genre.) | | |
| TKUMA: Israel - The First Fifty Years | May 3, 1998 | August 31, 2000 | | | |
| Bagpipe: Instrument of War | December 1, 1998 | November 30, 2000 | | | |
| NYTV: By the People Who Made It | December 14, 1998 | December 13, 2002 | | | |
| Death: A Personal Understanding | March 6, 1999 | March 5, 2009 | (Note: Originally titled A Personal Understanding of Death.) | | |
| Timewatch | September 1, 1999 | August 31, 2001 | | | |
| Timewatch | May 1, 2009 | April 30, 2011 | | | |
| Survivors | September 1, 1999 | August 31, 2001 | | | |
| Country House | September 1, 1999 | August 31, 2003 | (Note: Originally culture & lifestyle genre.) | | |
| The Celestial Empire | October 2, 1999 | December 31, 2006 | (Note: Culture & lifestyle genre in season 2.) | | |
| Ghost Hunters | November 1, 1999 | October 31, 2001 | | | |
| Lords of the Animals | November 1, 1999 | October 31, 2001 | | | |

==== 2000s ====
| Title | Premiere date | End date | Note(s) | Legend(s) | Source(s) |
|---|---|---|---|---|---|
| Rhythm of Life | January 1, 2000 | December 31, 2001 | | | |
| Anne Frank Remembered | April 1, 2000 | April 30, 2001 | | | |
| The Great Detectives | May 1, 2000 | April 30, 2002 | | | |
| Farming from the Heart | June 4, 2000 | February 18, 2008 | | | |
| The Promise of Play | September 1, 2000 | August 31, 2009 | | ^{APT WORLDWIDE} | |
| The Fall and Rise of Germany | October 8, 2000 | October 7, 2003 | | | |
| Bargain Hunt | December 1, 2000 | September 30, 2004 | (Note: Culture & lifestyle genre in season 1.) (Note: Series 1-3 only.) | | |
| They Came for Good: A History of Jews in the U.S. | April 1, 2001 | March 31, 2007 | | | |
| The Face: Jesus in Art | April 1, 2001 | March 25, 2008 | | ^{HDTV} | |
| East of the Blue Ridge | April 1, 2001 | March 31, 2004 | | | |
| The Struggle for Moral Leadership | April 29, 2001 | April 28, 2013 | | | |
| Jews & Christians: A Journey of Faith | September 2, 2001 | September 1, 2010 | | | |
| New Americans | April 14, 2002 | April 13, 2006 | | | |
| They Lived in Great Houses | April 21, 2002 | April 20, 2014 | | | |
| Skeleton Coast | August 1, 2002 | July 31, 2004 | | | |
| Two Men in a Trench | September 1, 2002 | March 31, 2006 | | | |
| Waasa Inaabidaa: We Look in All Directions | November 1, 2002 | October 31, 2014 | | | |
| Conspiracies | November 1, 2002 | October 31, 2004 | | | |
| Queen & Country | February 1, 2003 | January 31, 2005 | (Note: Four-part series.) | | |
| Pioneer Quest: A Year in the Real West | April 1, 2003 | March 31, 2005 | | | |
| 9/11: A Tale of Two Towers | September 1, 2003 | September 30, 2005 | | | |
| DDE Prime | November 1, 2003 | October 31, 2006 | (Note: This package includes Divine Magic: The World of the Supernatural, First Breath: Cradle in the Sea, the one-offs are The Weavers, Reflections of Mr. Bean, Hero School: Mountain Rescue, The Search for Amelia Earhart, Apollo One: Tragedy to Triumph, Tales from the Tomb: Lost Sons of Pharaoh, The Making of Butch Cassidy and the Sundance Kid, and Python: The Sly Strangler.) | | |
| Great Scenic Railway Journeys: Celebrating 175 Years of the American Railroad | November 28, 2003 | December 31, 2005 | (Note: Travel genre in the 1st release.) | | |
| Great Scenic Railway Journeys: Celebrating 175 Years of the American Railroad | February 28, 2006 | February 27, 2008 | (Note: Travel genre in the 1st release.) | | |
| Television in America: An Autobiography | June 4, 2004 | June 3, 2008 | | | |
| Quest for the Sea | September 1, 2004 | August 31, 2006 | | | |
| The Life Laundry | September 1, 2004 | August 31, 2006 | | | |
| The College Track | September 3, 2004 | September 2, 2011 | | ^{HDTV} | |
| Panama Canal: The Eighth Wonder of the World | December 1, 2004 | November 30, 2007 | | | |
| Panama Canal: The Eighth Wonder of the World | July 1, 2014 | June 30, 2016 | | | |
| Violent Planet | December 1, 2004 | November 30, 2006 | | | |
| Icons | December 1, 2004 | December 31, 2007 | | | |
| True Lives | January 1, 2005 | December 31, 2006 | (Note: Distributed by NETA (aka National Educational Telecommunications Association) in season 3 and 4.) | | |
| A Crisis of Faith | January 9, 2005 | January 8, 2007 | | ^{APT WORLDWIDE} | |
| Soundtrack of the Century | March 1, 2005 | February 28, 2008 | | | |
| Spy | April 1, 2005 | March 31, 2007 | | | |
| The Appalachians | April 1, 2005 | March 31, 2018 | | | |
| Mystic Voices: The Story of the Pequot War | May 1, 2005 | April 30, 2016 | | | |
| The World's Greatest Fair | July 1, 2005 | June 30, 2007 | | | |
| Greatest Escapes | September 1, 2005 | August 31, 2007 | | | |
| Who Do You Think You Are? | September 1, 2005 | August 31, 2007 | (Note: Series 1 only.) | | |
| Three Faiths, One God: Judaism, Christianity, Islam | October 1, 2005 | September 30, 2017 | | | |
| A Royal Family | October 1, 2005 | September 30, 2007 | | | |
| Cathedral | November 1, 2005 | October 31, 2007 | | | |
| Horizon Package | November 1, 2005 | October 31, 2007 | (Note: Series 2 only.) (Note: This package includes Anatomy of an Avalanche, A Code in the Nose, The Death Star, From Here to Infinity, and The Mystery of the Miami Circle in series 2.) | | |
| Japanland | November 6, 2005 | November 5, 2009 | | | |
| The Great Romances of the Twentieth Century | January 1, 2006 | December 31, 2008 | | | |
| War of the Century | March 1, 2006 | February 29, 2008 | | | |
| Pioneers in Aviation: The Race to the Moon | March 17, 2006 | March 16, 2009 | | | |
| Pioneers in Aviation: The Race to the Moon | April 16, 2012 | April 15, 2016 | | | |
| Return of the Chef | April 1, 2006 | March 31, 2008 | | | |
| Yoga Unveiled | April 1, 2006 | March 31, 2009 | | | |
| The Greatest Good | April 1, 2006 | March 31, 2014 | | | |
| The Reclaimers | May 1, 2006 | April 30, 2008 | | | |
| Secrets of... | May 1, 2006 | April 30, 2008 | | | |
| Monarchy with David Starkey | June 1, 2006 | September 30, 2010 | | | |
| Philosophy: A Guide to Happiness | June 2, 2006 | June 1, 2012 | | | |
| Bomber Boys: The Fighting Lancaster | June 30, 2006 | June 29, 2008 | | | |
| Status Anxiety | July 14, 2006 | July 13, 2009 | | | |
| The Queen's Cavalry | August 1, 2006 | July 31, 2008 | | | |
| Young Black Farmers | September 1, 2006 | August 31, 2008 | | | |
| Voces | September 2, 2006 | August 31, 2011 | (Note: Seasons 1 and 2 only.) (Note: Art & culture genre in season 1.) | ^{ITVS}^{LPB} | |
| Expo: Magic of the White City | September 3, 2006 | September 2, 2010 | | | |
| The Great Peking to Paris Expedition | November 1, 2006 | October 31, 2008 | | | |
| Remember | December 15, 2006 | December 14, 2008 | | | |
| The Bible Unearthed | December 31, 2006 | February 28, 2009 | | | |
| The Human Face | March 1, 2007 | February 28, 2009 | | | |
| Weapons of World War II | August 1, 2007 | July 31, 2009 | | | |
| Crisis at the Castle | November 1, 2007 | October 31, 2009 | | | |
| Beyond Theology | November 2, 2007 | November 1, 2015 | | | |
| Planet Tales | March 31, 2008 | March 30, 2010 | | | |
| Sky Cops | April 1, 2008 | November 30, 2011 | (Note: Drama genre in season 1.) | | |
| Nanotechnology: The Power of Small | April 1, 2008 | March 31, 2010 | | | |
| Guarding the Queen | April 1, 2008 | March 31, 2010 | | | |
| Destination: World | May 1, 2008 | February 28, 2011 | | | |
| AfroPop: The Ultimate Cultural Exchange | June 1, 2008 | April 30, 2026 | (Note: Seasons 1-15 only.) (Note: Now distributed by PBS.) | ^{WORLD} | |
| Devil's Brigade | July 1, 2008 | June 30, 2010 | | | |
| Currier & Ives: Perspectives on America | September 7, 2008 | September 6, 2026 | | | |
| Black Coffee | November 2, 2008 | November 1, 2010 | | | |
| Hotspots | November 2, 2008 | November 1, 2011 | | | |
| Paving the Way: The National Park-to-Park Highway | May 1, 2009 | April 30, 2018 | | | |
| Giant Screen Films | August 1, 2009 | July 31, 2011 | | | |
| The New Metropolis | September 6, 2009 | September 5, 2017 | | | |
| Justice: What's the Right Thing To Do? | September 13, 2009 | September 12, 2015 | | | |
| Broadside | October 1, 2009 | September 30, 2013 | | ^{APT WORLDWIDE} | |
| Let Freedom Ring | November 1, 2009 | October 31, 2011 | | | |

==== 2010s ====
| Title | Premiere date | End date | Note(s) | Legend(s) | Source(s) |
|---|---|---|---|---|---|
| For Love of Liberty: The Story of America's Black Patriots | February 1, 2010 | February 28, 2014 | | ^{APT WORLDWIDE} | |
| The World's Greatest Musical Prodigies | April 1, 2010 | March 31, 2012 | | | |
| Survival: Lives in the Balance | April 1, 2010 | March 31, 2016 | (Note: Planned to be a three-part series.) (Note: Originally titled Survival.) | | |
| World War II in HD Colour | August 1, 2010 | July 31, 2012 | | | |
| Around the World in 80 Trades | August 1, 2010 | July 31, 2012 | | | |
| Car Bomb | January 1, 2011 | December 31, 2012 | | | |
| The Asian and Abrahamic Religions: A Divine Encounter in America | April 1, 2011 | March 31, 2017 | | | |
| The Map Makers | September 1, 2011 | August 31, 2013 | | | |
| At Home with the Georgians | September 1, 2011 | August 31, 2013 | | | |
| The Savoy | December 1, 2011 | November 30, 2013 | (Note: Two-part series in series 1.) | | |
| The Savoy | April 1, 2023 | March 31, 2025 | (Note: Two-part series in series 1.) | | |
| Arab American Stories | July 7, 2012 | July 6, 2018 | | | |
| Ottomans Versus Christians: Battle for the Mediterranean | October 1, 2012 | September 30, 2014 | | ^{APT WORLDWIDE} | |
| Ottomans Versus Christians: Battle for the Mediterranean | April 1, 2017 | March 31, 2019 | | ^{APT WORLDWIDE} | |
| Mystery Cars | November 1, 2012 | October 31, 2014 | | | |
| Captain Cook: Obsession and Discovery | November 1, 2012 | October 31, 2014 | | | |
| David Suchet in the Footsteps of St. Paul | November 1, 2012 | October 31, 2014 | | | |
| She-Wolves: England's Early Queens | November 1, 2012 | December 31, 2014 | | | |
| Chatsworth House | January 1, 2013 | December 31, 2014 | | | |
| Eisenhower's Secret War | May 5, 2013 | December 31, 2016 | | ^{APT WORLDWIDE} | |
| Bid America | June 30, 2013 | June 29, 2015 | | | |
| Vintage | January 4, 2014 | January 3, 2016 | | | |
| Alexander's Lost World | April 1, 2014 | March 31, 2016 | | | |
| Civil War: The Untold Story | April 1, 2014 | March 31, 2018 | | ^{APT WORLDWIDE} | |
| Medieval Lives: Birth, Marriage, Death | September 1, 2014 | August 31, 2016 | | | |
| The Channel Islands at War | October 1, 2014 | September 30, 2016 | | | |
| Ultimate Restorations | October 6, 2014 | October 5, 2017 | | | |
| David Suchet in the Footsteps of St. Peter | November 1, 2014 | October 31, 2016 | | | |
| David Suchet in the Footsteps of St. Peter | December 1, 2016 | November 30, 2018 | | | |
| Royalty Close Up: The Photography of Kent Gavin | January 1, 2015 | December 31, 2016 | | | |
| Mothers, Murderers and Mistresses: Empresses of Ancient Rome | January 1, 2015 | December 31, 2016 | | | |
| Empire | April 1, 2015 | March 31, 2017 | | | |
| Henry and Anne: The Lovers Who Changed History | April 1, 2015 | March 31, 2017 | | | |
| How to Get Ahead | May 1, 2015 | April 30, 2017 | | | |
| The Queen's Castle | June 30, 2015 | June 29, 2017 | | | |
| The Queen's Castle | July 1, 2020 | June 30, 2022 | | | |
| The Wonder of Britain | September 1, 2015 | August 31, 2017 | | | |
| Tales of Irish Castles | October 1, 2015 | September 30, 2017 | | | |
| The Raising of America: Early Childhood and the Future of Our Nation | November 6, 2015 | November 5, 2019 | | | |
| Global Health Frontiers | February 4, 2016 | February 3, 2018 | | | |
| 1916 The Irish Rebellion | March 21, 2016 | March 20, 2019 | | | |
| Heart of the World: Colorado's National Parks | April 3, 2016 | April 2, 2020 | | | |
| The Best of Majestic Nature | June 1, 2016 | March 31, 2018 | | | |
| NHK WWII Specials | August 1, 2016 | October 29, 2016 | (Note: This package includes Nurses on the Battlefield Hidden Tragedy of WWII and Beneath the Mushroom Cloud.) | ^{NHK} | |
| Hidden Killers | October 1, 2016 | September 30, 2018 | | | |
| Playing by the Rules: Ethics at Work | November 3, 2016 | October 1, 2022 | | | |
| The Reformation: This Changed Everything | December 1, 2016 | November 30, 2018 | | | |
| The Ascent of Woman: A 10,000 Year Story | December 1, 2016 | May 31, 2019 | | | |
| Precision: The Measure of All Things | January 1, 2017 | December 31, 2018 | | | |
| Predict My Future: The Science of Us | January 1, 2017 | December 31, 2018 | | | |
| NHK March Specials | March 3, 2017 | June 20, 2017 | (Note: This package includes The Gate: A Pacific Journey, Five Years, Five Stories, and The Phone of the Wind: Whispers to Lost Families.) | ^{NHK} | |
| Ottomans Versus Christians: The Battle for Europe | April 1, 2017 | March 31, 2019 | | ^{APT WORLDWIDE} | |
| World War II: The Price of Empire | May 1, 2017 | April 30, 2019 | | | |
| West of the West: Tales from California's Channel Islands | May 4, 2017 | May 3, 2019 | | ^{APT WORLDWIDE} | |
| Your Health: A Sacred Matter | May 7, 2017 | May 6, 2026 | | | |
| Nature's Treasure Islands: A Journey to the UK Overseas Territories | June 30, 2017 | June 29, 2019 | | | |
| Murder Maps | August 1, 2017 | June 29, 2021 | | | |
| F.S. Key: After the Song | September 7, 2017 | September 6, 2020 | | | |
| Body Hack | January 1, 2018 | December 31, 2019 | | | |
| Inside the Tube: Going Underground | February 1, 2018 | January 31, 2020 | | | |
| Spying on the Royals | April 1, 2018 | March 31, 2020 | | | |
| Spying on the Royals | April 1, 2020 | March 31, 2022 | | | |
| Myths & Monsters | May 1, 2018 | April 30, 2020 | | | |
| Great British Royal Ships | June 30, 2018 | June 29, 2020 | | | |
| Empire Builders | July 1, 2018 | March 31, 2021 | | ^{APT WORLDWIDE} | |
| Vintage Roads Great & Small | November 1, 2018 | April 30, 2022 | | | |
| Elizabeth I | January 1, 2019 | December 31, 2020 | | | |
| Inside Balmoral | January 1, 2019 | December 31, 2020 | | | |
| QE2: The World's Greatest Cruise Ship | March 1, 2019 | February 28, 2021 | | | |
| The Directors | May 1, 2019 | June 30, 2022 | | | |
| Great Lighthouses of Ireland | June 21, 2019 | October 31, 2025 | | | |
| Big Ben: Saving the World's Most Famous Clock | June 30, 2019 | June 29, 2023 | | | |
| Inside the Foreign Office | August 1, 2019 | July 31, 2021 | | | |
| London: 2,000 Years of History | November 1, 2019 | October 31, 2021 | | | |
| Magic Numbers: Hannah Fry's Mysterious World of Maths | November 1, 2019 | October 31, 2021 | | | |

==== 2020s ====
| Title | Premiere date | End date | Note(s) | Legend(s) | Source(s) |
|---|---|---|---|---|---|
| Inside the Ritz Hotel | April 1, 2020 | March 31, 2023 | | | |
| Stories of Survival | April 2, 2020 | April 1, 2026 | | ^{APT WORLDWIDE} | |
| Hayao Miyazaki: 10 Years with the Master | May 5, 2020 | May 4, 2023 | (Note: Originally titled 10 Years with Hayao Miyazaki.) | ^{NHK} | |
| Heavenly Gardens | December 1, 2020 | November 30, 2022 | | | |
| The Brigade | December 1, 2020 | November 30, 2022 | | | |
| 400 Years: Taking the Knee | February 1, 2021 | January 31, 2023 | | | |
| The Palace and the Press | March 1, 2021 | February 28, 2023 | | | |
| Railway Murders | August 1, 2021 | July 31, 2023 | | | |
| A Short History of the English Garden | August 1, 2021 | July 31, 2023 | | ^{APT WORLDWIDE} | |
| Lost Home Movies of Nazi Germany | August 1, 2021 | July 31, 2023 | | | |
| Dismantling Democracy | October 15, 2020 | October 14, 2026 | | ^{APT WORLDWIDE} | |
| The Great Escape: The True Story | November 1, 2021 | October 31, 2023 | | | |
| The Bone Detectives | November 1, 2021 | October 31, 2023 | | | |
| Aerial Egypt | December 1, 2021 | November 30, 2023 | | | |
| The Hunger: The Story of The Irish Famine | December 1, 2021 | November 30, 2023 | | | |
| Castles: Mysteries and Legends | December 1, 2021 | November 30, 2023 | | | |
| Living with Hitler | December 1, 2021 | November 30, 2023 | | | |
| Winston Churchill's War | December 1, 2021 | November 30, 2023 | | | |
| Roadtrip Nation: All Paths Arizona | April 1, 2022 | March 31, 2026 | | | |
| Berlin Wall: Countdown to 1961/1989 | July 1, 2022 | June 30, 2024 | | | |
| Roadtrip Nation: Serving Change | September 5, 2022 | September 4, 2026 | | | |
| Pioneers of Television | November 1, 2022 | October 31, 2026 | (Note: Distributed by PBS from 2008 to 2019.) | | |
| 48 Hours to Victory | November 1, 2022 | October 31, 2024 | | | |
| Walking Victorian England | November 1, 2022 | October 31, 2024 | | | |
| The Unknown Master of Restoration | January 1, 2023 | August 31, 2023 | | ^{NHK} | |
| Puppy School | April 1, 2023 | March 31, 2025 | | | |
| The 100 Days | April 1, 2023 | March 31, 2025 | | | |
| Empire Builders: Mexico | September 1, 2023 | August 31, 2025 | | ^{APT WORLDWIDE} | |
| Free to Speak | October 1, 2023 | September 30, 2026 | | | |
| Treasures with Bettany Hughes | December 1, 2023 | November 30, 2025 | | | |
| Ukraine Under Attack: 72 Hours in the Presidential Office | December 1, 2023 | July 31, 2024 | | ^{NHK} | |
| The Real Crown: Inside the House of Windsor | May 1, 2024 | April 30, 2026 | | | |
| Alan Carr's Adventures with Agatha Christie | July 1, 2024 | June 30, 2026 | | | |
| Highclere: Behind the Scenes | November 1, 2024 | October 31, 2026 | | | |

=== Nature & science ===
==== 1970s ====
| Title | Premiere date | End date | Note(s) | Legend(s) | Source(s) |
|---|---|---|---|---|---|
| Great Zoos of the World | January 1, 1974 | April 30, 1986 | | | |

==== 1980s ====
| Title | Premiere date | End date | Note(s) | Legend(s) | Source(s) |
|---|---|---|---|---|---|
| De Bono's Course in Thinking | October 1, 1983 | September 30, 1985 | (Note: Originally science & health genre.) | | |
| The Living Planet | September 1, 1984 | December 31, 1987 | (Note: Originally nature genre.) | | |
| The Nature of Things with David Suzuki | July 1, 1987 | August 31, 1999 | | | |
| NatureScene | October 2, 1988 | April 2, 1999 | (Note: Distributed by PBS from 1978 to 1988.) (Note: Season 15 was distributed by NETA (aka National Educational Telecommunications Association).) (Note: Originally travel genre.) | | |
| The Gentle Doctor: Veterinary Medicine | October 9, 1988 | April 14, 2011 | | | |

==== 1990s ====
| Title | Premiere date | End date | Note(s) | Legend(s) | Source(s) |
|---|---|---|---|---|---|
| Medicine 2000 | December 1, 1994 | November 30, 2000 | | | |
| The Miraculous Cosmos of the Brain | May 16, 1997 | May 15, 2000 | | | |
| Space Tech | January 1, 1998 | January 31, 2000 | | | |
| What's Your Poison | January 1, 1998 | November 30, 2000 | | | |
| 21st Century Ark | April 1, 1999 | March 31, 2001 | | | |

==== 2000s ====
| Title | Premiere date | End date | Note(s) | Legend(s) | Source(s) |
|---|---|---|---|---|---|
| Stokes Birds at Home | January 9, 2000 | January 5, 2003 | (Note: Originally nature genre in season 2.) | | |
| Secrets of the Sequence | April 5, 2002 | October 3, 2003 | | ^{APT WORLDWIDE} | |
| American Forests' Tree Stories | April 7, 2002 | April 6, 2004 | | | |
| When Nature Strikes Back | August 1, 2002 | July 31, 2004 | | | |
| When Nature Strikes Back | March 1, 2006 | June 29, 2008 | | | |
| Masters of Technology | September 12, 2002 | September 11, 2011 | | | |
| World of Wildlife | March 1, 2003 | February 28, 2005 | (Note: Season 3 only.) | | |
| Big Ideas | April 1, 2003 | March 31, 2007 | | | |
| Jungle | November 1, 2004 | October 31, 2006 | | | |
| Jungle | February 1, 2008 | January 31, 2010 | | | |
| David Attenborough Package | March 1, 2005 | February 28, 2007 | | | |
| David Attenborough Package | July 1, 2007 | June 30, 2009 | | | |
| Why Dogs Smile & Chimpanzees Cry | March 1, 2005 | February 28, 2007 | | | |
| The Eyes of Nye | April 3, 2005 | April 2, 2011 | | | |
| The Great African Wildlife Rescue | September 1, 2005 | August 31, 2007 | | | |
| In the Wild | November 1, 2005 | May 6, 2008 | (Note: Distributed by PBS from 1995 to 2002.) | | |
| Animals Like Us | March 1, 2006 | February 29, 2008 | | | |
| Planet H20 | April 9, 2006 | April 8, 2009 | | | |
| Little Killers | June 30, 2006 | June 29, 2008 | | | |
| Ocean Crystals | August 1, 2006 | July 31, 2008 | | | |
| Thinking Big | September 1, 2006 | August 31, 2009 | | | |
| Disaster Detectives | November 1, 2006 | October 31, 2008 | | | |
| Cousins | November 1, 2006 | October 31, 2010 | | | |
| Wild Florida | January 6, 2007 | October 31, 2010 | | ^{APT WORLDWIDE} | |
| Wanderers of the Deep | March 1, 2007 | February 28, 2009 | | | |
| Savage Seas | November 1, 2007 | January 30, 2009 | (Note: Distributed by PBS from 1999 to 2003.) | | |
| A Year at Kew | December 1, 2007 | November 30, 2009 | | | |
| Attack! In Pursuit of Africa's Maneaters | December 1, 2007 | November 30, 2009 | | | |
| Curious | January 1, 2008 | December 31, 2010 | | | |
| Savage Planet | April 1, 2008 | December 30, 2009 | (Note: Distributed by PBS from 2000 to 2004.) | | |
| Be a Predator | April 1, 2008 | March 31, 2010 | | | |
| Quest: Investigating Our World | May 2, 2008 | May 1, 2012 | | | |
| Of Sharks and Men | December 1, 2008 | November 30, 2010 | | | |
| The Blue Realm | March 1, 2009 | October 31, 2011 | | | |
| The Blue Realm | April 1, 2012 | March 31, 2014 | | | |
| A Walk in the Park with Nick Mollé: Real Rocky | April 5, 2009 | April 4, 2018 | | | |

==== 2010s ====
| Title | Premiere date | End date | Note(s) | Legend(s) | Source(s) |
|---|---|---|---|---|---|
| Wildlife Nannies | March 1, 2010 | February 29, 2012 | | | |
| Science & Islam | July 1, 2010 | June 30, 2012 | | | |
| Science & Islam | August 1, 2013 | July 31, 2015 | | | |
| Nature's Power Revealed | September 1, 2011 | August 31, 2013 | | | |
| Wildlife Safaris | September 1, 2011 | August 31, 2013 | | | |
| The Zoo | January 1, 2012 | December 31, 2013 | | | |
| Wild Britain with Ray Mears | January 1, 2012 | December 31, 2013 | | | |
| Deserts | December 1, 2013 | November 30, 2015 | | | |
| Islands on the Edge | March 1, 2014 | February 29, 2016 | | | |
| Shock & Awe: The Story of Electricity | April 1, 2015 | March 31, 2017 | | | |
| Everyday Miracles | May 1, 2015 | April 30, 2017 | | | |
| Man & Beast with Martin Clunes | November 1, 2015 | October 31, 2017 | | | |
| The Age of Robots | January 1, 2016 | December 31, 2017 | | | |
| The Crowd & the Cloud | April 1, 2017 | March 31, 2020 | | | |
| Battleground Everglades | April 7, 2018 | April 6, 2026 | | ^{WORLD} | |
| Meet the Hedgehogs | August 1, 2018 | July 31, 2020 | | | |
| NHK Special: Jared Diamond's Rise of the Third Chimpanzee | January 1, 2019 | December 31, 2021 | | ^{NHK} | |
| Wild Philippines with Nigel Marven | April 11, 2019 | April 10, 2021 | | | |
| Tide | December 1, 2019 | November 30, 2021 | | | |

==== 2020s ====
| Title | Premiere date | End date | Note(s) | Legend(s) | Source(s) |
|---|---|---|---|---|---|
| BrainWorks: The Theatre of Neuroscience | June 14, 2020 | June 13, 2022 | | | |
| How to Make... | December 1, 2020 | November 30, 2022 | | | |
| Sounds of Nature | April 1, 2021 | March 31, 2023 | | | |
| A World Without NASA | July 1, 2021 | June 30, 2023 | | | |
| The Secret Science of Sewage | July 1, 2021 | June 30, 2023 | | | |
| Wild and Wonderful Denmark | January 1, 2022 | December 31, 2023 | | | |
| Charlie Bee Company | March 1, 2022 | February 29, 2024 | (Note: Season 1 only.) (Note: Season 2 was distributed by NETA (aka National Educational Telecommunications Association).) | | |
| The Burren: Heart of Stone | March 1, 2022 | February 28, 2025 | | ^{APT WORLDWIDE} | |
| The Great Whale Rescue | August 1, 2022 | July 31, 2024 | | | |
| Science View | September 1, 2022 | July 31, 2025 | | ^{NHK} | |
| Life: First Steps | April 11, 2023 | April 10, 2025 | | | |
| Puppy Secrets: The First Six Months | May 1, 2024 | April 30, 2026 | | | |

=== Art & culture ===
==== 1990s ====
| Title | Premiere date | End date | Note(s) | Legend(s) | Source(s) |
|---|---|---|---|---|---|
| Sister Wendy's Odyssey and Grand Tour | February 1, 1995 | March 31, 1998 | (Note: This package includes Sister Wendy's Odyssey and Sister Wendy's Grand Tour.) | | |
| The Mind's Eye Package | August 1, 1995 | July 31, 1997 | (Note: This package includes The Mind's Eye, Beyond the Mind's Eye and The Gate to the Mind's Eye.) | | |
| Hermitage Masterpieces | November 1, 1996 | October 3, 2004 | (Note: Originally art genre.) | | |
| Cartooning with Blitz | July 3, 1999 | August 31, 2011 | (Note: Originally how-to genre.) | | |
| The Reading Club | September 5, 1999 | June 30, 2001 | | | |

==== 2000s ====
| Title | Premiere date | End date | Note(s) | Legend(s) | Source(s) |
|---|---|---|---|---|---|
| La Plaza | July 1, 2001 | August 31, 2010 | (Note: Alternatively titled La Plaza: Conversations with Ilan Stavans in season 5 and 6.) | ^{LPB} | |
| Speaking Freely | September 1, 2001 | February 28, 2006 | | | |
| The BookShow with Patt Morrison | October 21, 2001 | October 20, 2004 | | | |
| Be Heard! | November 4, 2001 | November 3, 2005 | | | |
| Great Museums | September 1, 2002 | February 6, 2012 | | ^{HDTV} | |
| The Language of Photography | May 4, 2003 | May 3, 2011 | | | |
| The British Empire in Colour | November 1, 2003 | October 31, 2005 | | | |
| Colorvision | January 2, 2004 | January 1, 2008 | (Note: Originally titled Color TV.) | ^{ITVS}^{LPB} | |
| House with a History | October 1, 2005 | September 30, 2017 | | | |
| Black Writers in America | November 4, 2005 | November 3, 2009 | | | |
| Between the Lines with Barry Kibrick | April 2, 2006 | April 1, 2007 | | | |
| Farmers' Almanac TV | April 15, 2006 | January 5, 2011 | | | |
| Latino Heritage Package | May 1, 2006 | April 30, 2008 | (Note: This package includes Countdown: Reflections on a Life in Dance and Pasajero, A Journey of Time and Memory.) | ^{LPB} | |
| Great Museums: Year of the Museum Specials | May 1, 2006 | November 15, 2008 | (Note: This package includes Riches, Rivals and Radicals: 100 Years of Museums in America and The Museum of Modern Art: In Our Time in season 1 and National Baseball Hall of Fame: Home Base, Walker Art Center: Creative Catalyst, and Boston Children’s Museum: Mind Over Matter in season 2.) | | |
| Great Museums Specials: The Smithsonian National Zoo and the Museums of Havana, Cuba | October 5, 2008 | December 31, 2010 | (Note: This package includes Great Museums of Havana: Curious About Cuba and Great Museums: The Smithsonian National Zoo: Wild Thing!.) | | |
| Mythos with Joseph Campbell | December 1, 2008 | November 30, 2010 | | | |

==== 2010s ====
| Title | Premiere date | End date | Note(s) | Legend(s) | Source(s) |
|---|---|---|---|---|---|
| The International DanceSport World Championships 2009 | April 1, 2010 | March 31, 2012 | | | |
| Theatreland | August 1, 2010 | July 31, 2012 | | | |
| Art Through Time: A Global View | September 26, 2010 | September 25, 2015 | | | |
| Invitation to World Literature | October 3, 2010 | October 2, 2017 | | | |
| The Artist Toolbox | January 7, 2011 | January 6, 2017 | | ^{APT WORLDWIDE} | |
| Ebert Presents: At the Movies | January 21, 2011 | January 6, 2012 | (Note: Originally titled Roger Ebert Presents At the Movies.) | | |
| Official Best of Fest | April 1, 2011 | March 31, 2014 | | | |
| The International DanceSport World Championships 2010 | April 1, 2011 | March 31, 2013 | | | |
| The World DanceSport Federation Championships 2011 | April 1, 2012 | March 31, 2014 | | | |
| Fake or Fortune? | May 1, 2012 | March 31, 2023 | (Note: Documentary genre in seasons 1-3.) (Note: Series 1-8 only.) | | |
| Well Read | May 1, 2013 | September 6, 2018 | | | |
| The World DanceSport Federation Championships 2012 | May 1, 2013 | April 30, 2015 | | | |
| The Story of Women and Art | November 1, 2014 | October 31, 2016 | | | |
| MN Original | May 4, 2016 | March 31, 2025 | | | |
| Articulate with Jim Cotter | April 4, 2017 | March 31, 2025 | | | |
| Road Trip to the Arts: The Florida Keys | June 19, 2017 | June 18, 2020 | | | |
| Poetry in America | April 1, 2018 | November 22, 2025 | (Note: Season 1 and 2 only.) (Note: Season 1 was planned to end on March 31, 2026.) (Note: Season 2 was planned to end on April 3, 2026.) (Note: The first two seasons switched to PBS on November 23, 2025.) | | |
| The Art Detectives | August 1, 2018 | June 30, 2022 | | | |
| Portraits in Architecture | October 8, 2018 | October 7, 2022 | | ^{APT WORLDWIDE} | |
| Secrets of Britain's Great Cathedrals | January 1, 2019 | December 31, 2020 | | | |
| Reconnecting Roots | July 9, 2019 | April 7, 2026 | (Note: Season 2 ended on April 7, 2026.) (Note: Season 1 was planned to end on July 8, 2027.) (Note: Season 3 was planned to end on April 2, 2027.) (Note: Season 4 was planned to end on August 31, 2026.) | | |
| Art & Design in Chicago | November 1, 2019 | October 31, 2023 | | | |

==== 2020s ====
| Title | Premiere date | End date | Note(s) | Legend(s) | Source(s) |
|---|---|---|---|---|---|
| Secrets of the Museum | April 1, 2022 | March 31, 2025 | | | |
| Easter in Art | April 1, 2023 | March 31, 2025 | | | |

=== Biography ===
==== 1990s ====
| Title | Premiere date | End date | Note(s) | Legend(s) | Source(s) |
|---|---|---|---|---|---|
| Diana and the Royal Family | January 1, 1995 | December 31, 1996 | | | |
| House of Windsor: The Firm* | March 1, 1999 | February 28, 2001 | | | |

==== 2000s ====
| Title | Premiere date | End date | Note(s) | Legend(s) | Source(s) |
|---|---|---|---|---|---|
| Janson Movie Star Package | April 1, 2000 | March 31, 2015 | | | |
| Thomas Jefferson: A View from the Mountain | April 1, 2000 | March 31, 2002 | | | |
| Young Elizabeth | November 1, 2000 | October 31, 2002 | | | |
| South Bank Package | November 1, 2000 | October 31, 2002 | | | |
| Great Leaders | October 17, 2001 | October 16, 2002 | (Note: Originally biography/documentary genre.) | | |
| Muhammad Ali: Through the Eyes of the World | May 1, 2002 | December 31, 2004 | | | |
| Graham/Shea Package | August 1, 2002 | July 31, 2004 | (Note: This package includes Ruth and Billy Graham: What Grace Provides and George Beverly Shea: The Wonder of it All.) (Note: Ruth and Billy Graham: What Grace Provides was later a stand-alone special from this package.) | | |
| Looking for Victoria | March 1, 2005 | February 28, 2007 | | | |
| The Windsors: A Royal Dynasty | February 1, 2008 | January 31, 2010 | | | |
| Britography | July 1, 2008 | June 30, 2010 | | | |
| Winslow Homer: Society and Solitude | September 7, 2008 | September 6, 2016 | (Note: Originally documentary genre.) | | |

==== 2010s ====
| Title | Premiere date | End date | Note(s) | Legend(s) | Source(s) |
|---|---|---|---|---|---|
| The Queen's Diamond Decades | September 1, 2013 | August 31, 2015 | | | |
| Hollywood Idols | September 1, 2015 | December 31, 2019 | | | |
| A Tale of Two Sisters | December 1, 2017 | April 30, 2021 | | | |
| The Stuarts: A Bloody Reign | January 1, 2019 | December 31, 2020 | | | |
| The Stuarts: A Bloody Reign | February 1, 2021 | January 31, 2023 | | | |
| Nicholas & Alexandra: The Letters | April 1, 2019 | March 31, 2022 | | | |
| Emperor Akihito | October 1, 2019 | March 31, 2020 | | ^{NHK} | |

==== 2020s ====
| Title | Premiere date | End date | Note(s) | Legend(s) | Source(s) |
|---|---|---|---|---|---|
| Titans of the 20th Century | April 1, 2020 | March 31, 2023 | | | |
| Anne Boleyn: Arrest, Trial, Execution | August 1, 2021 | July 31, 2023 | | | |
| Kennedy Package | May 1, 2023 | April 30, 2025 | (Note: This package includes JFK - The Making of a President, RFK - The Lost President, and Jackie - A Tale of Two Sisters.) | | |

=== Aviation/military ===
==== 1980s ====
| Title | Premiere date | End date | Note(s) | Legend(s) | Source(s) |
|---|---|---|---|---|---|
| War: A Commentary by Gwynne Dyer | October 1, 1985 | September 30, 1987 | | | |

==== 1990s ====
| Title | Premiere date | End date | Note(s) | Legend(s) | Source(s) |
|---|---|---|---|---|---|
| America Goes to War: The Homefront-WWII | October 1, 1990 | September 30, 1992 | | | |
| America Goes to War: The Homefront-WWII | December 1, 2001 | November 30, 2003 | | | |
| A Fighter Pilot's Story | June 1, 1994 | July 31, 2003 | | | |
| Tanks! | June 30, 1999 | June 29, 2001 | | | |
| Breaking the Codes | September 30, 1999 | September 29, 2001 | | | |

==== 2000s ====
| Title | Premiere date | End date | Note(s) | Legend(s) | Source(s) |
|---|---|---|---|---|---|
| Legends of Airpower | September 17, 2000 | December 31, 2005 | (Note: Distributed by NETA (aka National Educational Telecommunications Association) from 2018 to 2020.) | ^{APT WORLDWIDE} | |
| Futurewar | February 1, 2002 | January 31, 2004 | | | |
| The War Behind the Wire | June 1, 2002 | April 30, 2004 | | | |
| Warbirds of World War II | April 1, 2003 | July 31, 2008 | | | |
| The American Civil War | November 1, 2003 | October 31, 2005 | | | |
| Battlefield | April 1, 2004 | October 31, 2006 | (Note: Season 6 only.) | | |
| Japan's War in Colour | July 1, 2004 | June 30, 2006 | | | |
| World War II: The Complete History | November 1, 2004 | October 31, 2006 | | | |
| Battlefield Britain | February 1, 2005 | January 31, 2007 | | | |
| They Filmed the War in Color: France is Free! | July 1, 2005 | June 30, 2007 | | | |
| The Pacific War: They Filmed the War in Color | March 1, 2006 | February 29, 2008 | | | |
| Air Travel: Zeppelin to Concorde | August 1, 2006 | July 31, 2008 | | | |
| Canada's War in Colour | April 1, 2007 | March 31, 2009 | | | |
| Gladiators of World War II | June 30, 2008 | June 29, 2010 | | | |
| Colour of War: The British Story | March 1, 2009 | October 31, 2010 | | | |

==== 2010s ====
| Title | Premiere date | End date | Note(s) | Legend(s) | Source(s) |
|---|---|---|---|---|---|
| Korea: The Forgotten War in Colour | April 1, 2011 | March 31, 2013 | | | |
| Korea: The Forgotten War in Colour | June 1, 2013 | May 31, 2015 | | | |
| Korea: The Forgotten War in Colour | January 1, 2019 | December 31, 2020 | | | |
| Nazi Hunters | April 1, 2011 | March 31, 2013 | | | |
| World War Two: 1941 and the Man of Steel | April 1, 2015 | March 31, 2017 | | | |
| SAS: Rogue Warriors | January 1, 2018 | December 31, 2019 | | | |

==== 2020s ====
| Title | Premiere date | End date | Note(s) | Legend(s) | Source(s) |
|---|---|---|---|---|---|
| The Restorers | February 1, 2020 | January 31, 2022 | (Note: 2016 version.) | | |
| Citizen Soldier | May 1, 2020 | April 30, 2022 | (Note: Distributed by PBS from 2013 to 2020.) | | |
| Across the Pacific | May 18, 2020 | May 17, 2025 | | | |
| Nazi War Machines: Secrets Uncovered | December 1, 2020 | November 30, 2022 | | | |
| Australia in Colour | December 1, 2021 | November 30, 2023 | | | |
| The Dambusters Story: A Battle Against Time | March 1, 2022 | February 29, 2024 | | | |
| Battle Honours | April 1, 2022 | March 31, 2024 | | | |
| Deception: World War II | August 1, 2024 | July 31, 2026 | | | |

=== Non-fiction ===
==== 2010s ====
| Title | Premiere date | End date | Note(s) | Legend(s) | Source(s) |
|---|---|---|---|---|---|
| Coal House | October 1, 2014 | September 30, 2016 | | | |
| Coal House at War | October 1, 2014 | September 30, 2016 | | | |

== Documentary specials ==
=== Nature & science ===
==== 1980s ====
| Title | Premiere date | End date | Note(s) | Legend(s) | Source(s) |
|---|---|---|---|---|---|
| Drug Free Kids: A Parent's Guide | January 11, 1988 | January 10, 1991 | | | |

==== 1990s ====
| Title | Premiere date | End date | Note(s) | Legend(s) | Source(s) |
|---|---|---|---|---|---|
| Lord of the Lions: Adamson of Africa | August 1, 1991 | July 31, 1994 | | | |
| Blue Water Hunters | January 1, 1992 | December 31, 1993 | | | |
| Baby Gorillas: A Gorilla Family Portrait | March 1, 1992 | August 31, 1996 | | | |
| Dare the Wildest River | December 1, 1994 | November 30, 2003 | | | |
| Jungle Under Glass | January 1, 1995 | December 31, 2003 | | | |
| Colours of Infinity* | September 1, 1996 | August 31, 1998 | | | |
| Colours of Infinity* | September 1, 1998 | August 31, 2000 | | | |
| Colours of Infinity* | September 1, 2000 | August 31, 2002 | | | |
| Showcase of the Ages | November 1, 1996 | October 3, 2005 | | | |
| Mars: The Red Planet | February 1, 1997 | January 31, 1999 | | | |
| Beauty and the Beasts | May 1, 1997 | April 30, 1999 | | | |
| Cosmic Travellers: Comets and Asteroids | May 18, 1997 | May 31, 1999 | | | |
| Planetary Traveler | March 1, 1998 | February 29, 2000 | | | |
| Male Menopause with Jed Diamond | March 13, 1998 | March 12, 2002 | | | |
| Archie Carr: A Naturalist in Florida | September 13, 1998 | September 12, 2001 | | | |
| The Dolphin's Image | December 1, 1998 | November 30, 2000 | | | |
| What's Up in Technology? | January 1, 1999 | December 31, 2000 | | | |
| What's Up in Technology? | March 29, 2002 | March 28, 2005 | | | |
| Exploring Two Frontiers: The Neurolab Space Shuttle | March 7, 1999 | March 6, 2002 | | | |
| Exploring Your Brain II | April 4, 1999 | April 3, 2001 | | | |
| Autumn Journey: The Migration of Storks | May 1, 1999 | April 30, 2001 | | | |
| Lords of the Lake | May 1, 1999 | April 30, 2001 | | | |
| Polar Bear: Arctic Odyssey | June 30, 1999 | June 29, 2001 | | | |
| There's a Penguin in the House! | June 30, 1999 | June 29, 2001 | | | |
| Bird Brains | December 1, 1999 | November 30, 2001 | | | |

==== 2000s ====
| Title | Premiere date | End date | Note(s) | Legend(s) | Source(s) |
|---|---|---|---|---|---|
| Little Pandas: The New Breed | March 1, 2000 | February 28, 2002 | | | |
| Tough Ducks | April 1, 2000 | March 31, 2002 | | | |
| Gardens Great and Small | July 23, 2000 | July 22, 2006 | | | |
| Dive to Shark City with Neil Morrissey | August 1, 2000 | July 31, 2002 | | | |
| The Origin of Species — An Illustrated Guide | August 1, 2000 | July 31, 2002 | | | |
| The Perfect Puppy Guide | November 23, 2000 | December 31, 2002 | | ^{APT WORLDWIDE} | |
| Fairy Penguins* | April 1, 2001 | March 31, 2003 | | | |
| Sharks: The Silent Killers | November 1, 2001 | October 31, 2003 | | | |
| What's Up in the Environment? | March 29, 2002 | March 28, 2011 | | | |
| White Whales and Narwhals: The Chattering of Ghosts | April 1, 2002 | March 31, 2004 | | | |
| Into the Teeth of the Blizzard | April 1, 2002 | March 31, 2004 | | | |
| Sanctuary: A New Life for Research Chimps | September 1, 2002 | August 31, 2004 | | | |
| Yellowstone: America's Eden | March 1, 2003 | February 28, 2006 | | | |
| Out in Nature: Homosexual Behavior in the Animal Kingdom | April 1, 2003 | January 31, 2005 | | | |
| A Bridge to Mars | December 2, 2003 | December 1, 2005 | (Note: Planned to be documentary genre.) | ^{HDTV} | |
| Tree Stories: Leaving a Legacy | April 4, 2004 | April 3, 2006 | | | |
| Shark Gordon Most Dangerous Moments | June 30, 2004 | June 29, 2006 | | | |
| Predator Legends | September 5, 2004 | September 4, 2016 | | | |
| Menziwa's Children: Elephants of Zimbabwe | November 1, 2004 | October 31, 2006 | | | |
| Pandas: The Great Leap Forward | November 1, 2004 | October 31, 2006 | | | |
| Expedition Florida: Wild Alachua | April 17, 2005 | April 16, 2016 | | | |
| Pets: A Very Natural History | June 30, 2005 | June 29, 2007 | | | |
| Killer Whales Up Close and Personal | November 1, 2005 | November 30, 2007 | | | |
| Peace: The Handraised Polar Bear | January 1, 2006 | December 31, 2007 | (Note: Documentary genre in the 1st release.) | | |
| Peace: The Handraised Polar Bear | December 1, 2008 | November 30, 2010 | (Note: Documentary genre in the 1st release.) | | |
| Hollywood's Magical Island: Catalina | February 1, 2006 | January 31, 2009 | | | |
| Realm of the Lobster | March 1, 2006 | February 29, 2008 | | | |
| When Sharks Attack | June 30, 2006 | June 29, 2008 | | | |
| Kamuy: The Japanese Brown Bear | July 1, 2006 | June 30, 2008 | | | |
| Springtime for the Weddell Seals | July 1, 2006 | June 30, 2008 | | | |
| Earth Edition: Delicate Blooms: South Florida's Native Orchids | September 1, 2006 | August 31, 2018 | | | |
| Humpback Whale | November 1, 2006 | October 31, 2008 | | | |
| Gorillas: On the Trail of King Kong | November 1, 2006 | October 31, 2008 | | | |
| Sleeping Monsters, Sacred Fires: Volcanoes of New Mexico | November 1, 2006 | October 31, 2012 | | | |
| Dolphins: The Code Breaker | December 1, 2006 | November 30, 2008 | | | |
| Jewels of the Jungle | January 7, 2007 | January 6, 2015 | | | |
| The Song of the Earth | March 1, 2007 | February 28, 2009 | | | |
| Chimpanzees: Return to the Forest | April 1, 2007 | March 31, 2009 | | | |
| Expedition Florida: The Big Bend Coast | July 1, 2007 | June 30, 2017 | | | |
| Oceanos Deep Quest | August 1, 2007 | July 31, 2009 | | | |
| Addo's Elephants | November 1, 2007 | October 31, 2009 | | | |
| The Moon | November 1, 2007 | October 31, 2009 | | | |
| We Are the Aliens | March 31, 2008 | March 31, 2010 | | | |
| Whales of Atlantis | April 1, 2008 | March 31, 2010 | | | |
| Chimps Are People Too | June 30, 2008 | June 29, 2011 | | | |
| Long Live Grandma Hippo | October 1, 2008 | September 30, 2010 | | | |
| Panda Nursery | November 1, 2008 | October 31, 2010 | | | |
| Flight of the Elephants | November 1, 2008 | October 31, 2010 | | | |
| Reef Route 66 | November 1, 2008 | October 31, 2010 | | | |
| Wildside with Nick Mollé: Costa Rica | April 5, 2009 | April 4, 2018 | | | |

==== 2010s ====
| Title | Premiere date | End date | Note(s) | Legend(s) | Source(s) |
|---|---|---|---|---|---|
| Rare Bird | January 3, 2010 | January 2, 2013 | | | |
| Cheetah Man | March 1, 2010 | February 29, 2012 | | | |
| The Brain That Changes Itself | April 1, 2010 | March 31, 2012 | | | |
| Blast! | July 23, 2010 | December 31, 2011 | (Note: Alternative titled B.L.A.S.T.!..) | | |
| Edge of the Everglades: Big Cypress National Preserve | September 5, 2010 | September 4, 2016 | | | |
| The Cosmic Code Breakers | January 1, 2011 | December 31, 2012 | | | |
| A Walk in the Park with Nick Mollé: Rivers of the Rockies | March 2, 2011 | March 1, 2026 | | | |
| Ele Tele | September 1, 2011 | August 31, 2013 | | | |
| The Joy of Stats | November 1, 2011 | October 31, 2013 | | | |
| Outbreak: Anatomy of a Plague | April 1, 2012 | March 31, 2014 | | | |
| A Man Among Orcas | August 1, 2012 | July 31, 2014 | | | |
| Earth Songs | November 23, 2012 | December 31, 2013 | | | |
| Earth Songs | March 1, 2014 | June 30, 2015 | | | |
| The Joy of Chance | September 1, 2013 | August 31, 2015 | | | |
| Saving Elephants: The Eyes of Thailand | September 1, 2013 | August 31, 2015 | | | |
| Saving Luna | March 1, 2014 | February 29, 2016 | | | |
| Ocean Frontiers: The Dawn of a New Era in Ocean Stewardship | April 1, 2014 | March 31, 2017 | | | |
| Sharks: The Big Five | December 1, 2014 | November 30, 2016 | | | |
| Johnny Kingdom and the Bears of Alaska | December 1, 2014 | November 30, 2016 | | | |
| The Joy of Logic | December 31, 2014 | December 30, 2016 | | | |
| Sand Wars | January 1, 2015 | December 31, 2016 | | | |
| Carpe Diem: A Fishy Tale | February 1, 2015 | January 31, 2017 | (Note: A stand-alone special from The Nature of Things.) | | |
| A Volcano Odyssey | May 1, 2015 | April 30, 2017 | | | |
| Explosions: How We Shook the World | September 1, 2015 | August 31, 2017 | | | |
| Sea of Creepy Monsters | November 1, 2015 | October 31, 2017 | | | |
| Secret Life of Pigeons | November 1, 2015 | October 31, 2017 | | | |
| Mysteries of the Coral Canyon | November 1, 2015 | October 31, 2017 | | | |
| Lionsrock: Return of the King | April 1, 2016 | March 31, 2018 | | | |
| The Condor's Shadow | April 1, 2016 | March 31, 2018 | | | |
| Exotic Invaders: Pythons of the Everglades | April 1, 2016 | March 31, 2018 | | | |
| Great Scientists in Their Own Words | April 1, 2016 | March 31, 2018 | | | |
| Buddies: How Dogs Discovered Man | April 1, 2016 | March 31, 2018 | | | |
| Beak and Brain: Genius Birds from Down Under | September 1, 2016 | August 31, 2018 | | | |
| The Secret Rules of Modern Living: Algorithms | September 1, 2016 | August 31, 2018 | | | |
| Beary Tales | September 1, 2016 | August 31, 2018 | | | |
| My Family and Other Turkeys with Nigel Marven | November 1, 2016 | October 31, 2018 | | | |
| Wild Venice | April 1, 2017 | March 31, 2019 | | | |
| Doing The Reptile Rumba from the Rainforest of Ranomafana | April 2, 2017 | April 1, 2021 | | | |
| My Sheepdog and Me | June 30, 2017 | June 29, 2019 | | | |
| The Truth About Alcohol | June 30, 2017 | June 29, 2019 | | | |
| Garden Wild! | June 30, 2017 | July 31, 2018 | | | |
| Penguin Hospital | September 1, 2017 | August 31, 2019 | | | |
| National Parks: Troubled Edens | November 1, 2017 | October 31, 2021 | | | |
| The Brain's Way of Healing | November 1, 2017 | October 31, 2019 | | | |
| Sun Bears: Life Is One | April 1, 2018 | March 31, 2020 | | | |
| The AI Race | June 30, 2018 | June 29, 2020 | | | |
| The Joy of Data | August 1, 2018 | July 31, 2020 | | | |
| Can You Fix a Brain Like Mine? | December 1, 2018 | November 30, 2020 | | | |
| Punda the Zebra | January 1, 2019 | December 31, 2020 | | | |
| Wild Boar: The Comeback | June 30, 2019 | June 29, 2021 | | | |
| The Joy of AI | June 30, 2019 | June 29, 2021 | | | |
| A Walk in the Park with Nick Mollé: Nature of the Beasts | July 31, 2019 | July 30, 2025 | | | |

==== 2020s ====
| Title | Premiere date | End date | Note(s) | Legend(s) | Source(s) |
|---|---|---|---|---|---|
| AI vs The Human Brain: The Final Showdown | July 1, 2020 | June 30, 2022 | | | |
| Wild Shetland: Scotland's Viking Frontier | December 1, 2020 | November 30, 2022 | | | |
| Zoo Mum | February 1, 2021 | January 31, 2023 | | | |
| Animals Reunited | April 1, 2021 | March 31, 2023 | | | |
| Bears of Durango | July 2, 2021 | July 1, 2024 | | ^{APT WORLDWIDE} | |
| A Song for Love: An Ape with An App | August 1, 2021 | July 31, 2023 | | | |
| The Otter: Return of the Legend | November 1, 2021 | October 31, 2023 | | | |
| Africa's Wild Roommates: How Animals Share Bed and Board | November 1, 2021 | October 31, 2023 | | | |
| Birthplace of the Giants | January 1, 2022 | December 31, 2023 | | | |
| The Search for the Ocean's Super Predator | January 1, 2022 | December 31, 2023 | | | |
| Kids vs. Screens | November 1, 2022 | October 31, 2024 | | | |
| Wild Horses: A Tale from the Puszta | November 1, 2022 | October 31, 2024 | | | |
| T-Rex: An Evolutionary Journey | November 1, 2022 | October 31, 2024 | | | |
| Ocean Souls | April 1, 2023 | March 31, 2025 | | | |
| Nature's Cleanup Crew | July 1, 2023 | June 30, 2025 | | | |
| Cecil, the Real Lion King | January 1, 2024 | December 31, 2025 | (Note: Originally titled The Cecil.) | | |
| Attenborough and the Giant Elephant | April 1, 2024 | March 31, 2026 | | | |
| Bear: Koala Hero | August 1, 2024 | July 31, 2026 | | | |

=== Art & culture ===
==== 1990s ====
| Title | Premiere date | End date | Note(s) | Legend(s) | Source(s) |
|---|---|---|---|---|---|
| Architecture and Children's Museums: Through the Looking Glass | April 15, 1995 | April 14, 1999 | | | |
| La Festa | June 30, 1996 | June 29, 1998 | | | |
| The Chemo Paintings | December 1, 1996 | November 30, 1999 | | | |
| Paul Stankard: Inventing Illusions | August 3, 1997 | August 2, 2000 | | | |
| The Body of Christ: In the Art of Europe and New Spain 1150-1800 | March 19, 1999 | March 17, 2014 | | | |
| The Mystery of the Van Gogh Fakes | July 15, 1999 | July 14, 2001 | | | |

==== 2000s ====
| Title | Premiere date | End date | Note(s) | Legend(s) | Source(s) |
|---|---|---|---|---|---|
| Soul of Africa | February 1, 2000 | April 30, 2002 | | | |
| Conserving a Legacy | September 1, 2000 | August 31, 2002 | | | |
| Geisha | November 1, 2000 | October 31, 2002 | | | |
| Ginevra's Story | November 5, 2000 | November 4, 2003 | | | |
| Albert Paley: Man of Steel | January 12, 2001 | January 11, 2004 | (Note: Originally biography genre.) | | |
| One Stroke Painting with Donna Dewberry | November 20, 2001 | November 17, 2004 | (Note: One-hour Special.) | | |
| One Stroke Painting with Donna Dewberry: A Year of Flowers | February 24, 2002 | February 23, 2003 | | | |
| Renoir to Rothko: The Eye of Duncan Phillips | September 1, 2002 | August 31, 2008 | | ^{APT WORLDWIDE}^{HDTV} | |
| Kristen's Fairy House | June 1, 2003 | December 31, 2004 | | | |
| Simply Painting Around the World with Frank Clarke | August 1, 2003 | July 31, 2007 | (Note: Virtual Pledge Event.) | | |
| Hermitage Masterpieces | November 21, 2003 | December 31, 2004 | | | |
| Sugarplum Dreams: Staging the Nutcracker Ballet | November 23, 2003 | November 22, 2019 | | | |
| Crafting an American Style: The East | February 27, 2004 | February 26, 2006 | | | |
| Carmina Burana: The Ballet | April 4, 2004 | April 3, 2012 | | | |
| Raiders of the Lost Art | January 1, 2005 | December 31, 2006 | | | |
| Through the Eyes of the Sculptor | April 1, 2005 | March 31, 2014 | | | |
| Confluence: A Duet of Words and Music | April 10, 2005 | April 9, 2009 | (Note: Planned to be music & entertainment genre.) | | |
| Where Words Prevail | January 1, 2006 | December 31, 2009 | | ^{APT WORLDWIDE} | |
| Recalling Orange County | October 28, 2006 | September 1, 2009 | (Note: As part of Voces.) | ^{ITVS} | |
| New York City Ballet: Bringing Balanchine Back | November 1, 2006 | October 31, 2010 | | ^{APT WORLDWIDE} | |
| Picturing Mary | December 1, 2006 | November 30, 2010 | | | |
| Artist's Table: Jacques Pépin and Itzhak Perlman | April 1, 2008 | March 31, 2014 | | ^{APT WORLDWIDE} | |
| Great Museums: China: West Meets East at the Metropolitan Museum of Art | July 1, 2008 | December 31, 2010 | | | |
| All About Prints | May 1, 2009 | April 30, 2017 | | | |
| Words on the Wind | November 1, 2009 | October 31, 2017 | (Note: Volume 1.) | | |

==== 2010s ====
| Title | Premiere date | End date | Note(s) | Legend(s) | Source(s) |
|---|---|---|---|---|---|
| New Glass at Wheaton | January 3, 2011 | January 2, 2016 | | | |
| Highgrove: Alan Meets Prince Charles | September 1, 2011 | August 31, 2013 | | | |
| Discovering Hamlet | November 1, 2011 | October 31, 2013 | | | |
| A Conversation with America's Poet Laureate: W.S. Merwin | November 3, 2011 | November 2, 2017 | | | |
| The Secret of Beethoven's Fifth Symphony | June 30, 2017 | June 29, 2019 | | | |
| The World of Ice Dance International | April 3, 2018 | April 2, 2020 | (Note: Originally titled Ice Dance International and Friends.) | | |
| Shakespeare: The Legacy | June 30, 2018 | June 29, 2020 | | | |

==== 2020s ====
| Title | Premiere date | End date | Note(s) | Legend(s) | Source(s) |
|---|---|---|---|---|---|
| The Anisfield-Wolf Book Awards 2020 | February 1, 2021 | January 31, 2022 | | | |
| The Work of Art: Reno Phil | March 1, 2021 | February 28, 2025 | | | |
| Hippocrates Café: Reflections on the Pandemic | April 1, 2021 | March 31, 2024 | | | |
| United We Dance | July 4, 2021 | July 3, 2024 | | | |
| Renaissance Woman Restored | January 1, 2022 | December 31, 2024 | | | |
| The 86th Annual Anisfield-Wolf Book Awards | January 1, 2022 | December 31, 2022 | | | |
| How to Paint the Mona Lisa | November 1, 2022 | October 31, 2024 | | | |
| The 87th Annual Anisfield-Wolf Book Awards | January 1, 2023 | December 31, 2023 | | | |
| 7 Lives of Music: The Kanneh-Mason Family | November 1, 2023 | October 31, 2025 | | | |
| The 88th Annual Anisfield-Wolf Book Awards | January 1, 2024 | December 31, 2024 | | | |
| Flamenco: Spirit of Seville | February 22, 2024 | April 30, 2025 | | | |
| Schama on Rembrandt: Masterpieces of the Late Years | November 1, 2024 | October 31, 2026 | | | |
| The 89th Annual Anisfield-Wolf Book Awards | January 1, 2025 | December 31, 2025 | | | |

=== Biography ===
==== 1990s ====
| Title | Premiere date | End date | Note(s) | Legend(s) | Source(s) |
|---|---|---|---|---|---|
| The Unforgettable Nat "King" Cole | March 1, 1990 | December 31, 1997 | | | |
| The Reindeer Queen | July 31, 1992 | July 30, 1995 | (Note: Originally documentary genre in the 2nd release.) | | |
| The Reindeer Queen | November 1, 2007 | October 31, 2015 | (Note: Originally documentary genre in the 2nd release.) | | |
| Jack Benny: Comedy in Bloom | March 3, 1993 | March 31, 1995 | (Note: Comedy genre in the 1st and 2nd releases.) | | |
| Jack Benny: Comedy in Bloom | November 1, 2007 | October 31, 2010 | (Note: Comedy genre in the 1st and 2nd releases.) | | |
| Jack Benny: Comedy in Bloom | November 1, 2010 | October 31, 2012 | (Note: Comedy genre in the 1st and 2nd releases.) | | |
| Garrison Keillor — The Wide Open Page | March 2, 1994 | May 31, 1997 | | | |
| Jackie Onassis: An Intimate Portrait | June 1, 1994 | July 31, 1999 | | | |
| Jackie Onassis: An Intimate Portrait | June 30, 2006 | June 29, 2009 | | | |
| The Story of Lassie | August 14, 1994 | August 13, 2004 | | | |
| The Story of Lassie | October 31, 2009 | October 30, 2011 | | | |
| J. R. R. Tolkien | February 1, 1995 | January 31, 1997 | | | |
| J. R. R. Tolkien | November 1, 2001 | October 31, 2003 | | | |
| Pope John Paul II | October 1, 1995 | September 30, 1997 | | | |
| Elizabeth Taylor | October 27, 1995 | November 1, 2000 | | | |
| La Stupenda: Portrait of Dame Joan Sutherland | December 1, 1995 | November 30, 1997 | | | |
| Crusade: The Billy Graham Story | January 1, 1996 | December 31, 1997 | | | |
| The Divorce | August 1, 1996 | July 31, 1998 | | | |
| Grace Metalious and Peyton Place | September 1, 1996 | August 31, 2002 | | | |
| Morrie: Lessons on Living | November 1, 1996 | October 31, 1998 | | | |
| The King and Queen: The War Years | November 1, 1996 | October 31, 1998 | | | |
| The Teddy Kollek Story: To Live A Dream | April 1, 1997 | March 31, 1999 | | | |
| Monty Roberts: The Real Horse Whisperer | December 1, 1997 | November 30, 1999 | | | |
| Monty Roberts: The Real Horse Whisperer | April 1, 2000 | March 31, 2002 | | | |
| The Queen Mother: A Woman of Her Century | March 1, 1998 | February 29, 2000 | | | |
| The Queen Mother: A Woman of Her Century | August 1, 2000 | July 31, 2002 | | | |
| Bernardin | July 2, 1998 | July 1, 2001 | | | |
| Althea Gibson* | August 1, 1998 | July 31, 2001 | | | |
| John Kenneth Galbraith: An American Life* | October 1, 1998 | September 30, 2001 | | | |
| James Cagney: City Boy, Country Gentleman | December 1, 1998 | November 30, 2000 | | | |
| The Man Who Saw the Future | January 1, 1999 | January 31, 2001 | | | |
| The Odyssey of Captain Healy | April 1, 1999 | August 31, 2001 | | | |
| The Odyssey of Captain Healy | February 1, 2002 | January 31, 2018 | | | |
| Hendrix: Band of Gypsys | May 1, 1999 | February 28, 2001 | | | |
| Author of Reform: The Cardinal Suenens Story | November 2, 1999 | November 1, 2002 | | ^{APT WORLDWIDE} | |
| Guy Lombardo: When We Danced | November 28, 1999 | January 2, 2001 | | | |

==== 2000s ====
| Title | Premiere date | End date | Note(s) | Legend(s) | Source(s) |
|---|---|---|---|---|---|
| Claude Monet Painter of Light | December 1, 2000 | November 30, 2002 | | | |
| Isa: The People's Diva | March 1, 2001 | March 31, 2004 | | | |
| Sonja Henie: Queen of the Ice | June 30, 2001 | June 29, 2003 | (Note: Sports genre in the 1st release.) | | |
| Sonja Henie: Queen of the Ice | June 30, 2009 | June 29, 2011 | (Note: Sports genre in the 1st release.) | | |
| Willie the Lion | February 3, 2002 | February 2, 2008 | | | |
| Dino De Laurentiis | March 1, 2002 | February 28, 2004 | | | |
| Jackie: Power and Style | February 1, 2003 | January 31, 2005 | | | |
| Alois Brunner: The Last Nazi | March 1, 2003 | February 28, 2006 | | | |
| Reagan: The Hollywood Years | June 30, 2003 | June 29, 2006 | | | |
| Gregory Peck: His Own Man | November 1, 2003 | October 31, 2005 | | | |
| Montgomery: An English Soldier | November 1, 2003 | October 31, 2005 | | | |
| Dorothy Dandridge: An American Beauty | February 1, 2004 | January 31, 2006 | | | |
| Frontier Visionary: George Catlin and the Plains Indians | February 1, 2004 | January 31, 2012 | | | |
| Yul Brynner: The Man Who Was King | March 1, 2004 | February 28, 2006 | | | |
| The Storied Life of Millie Benson | March 7, 2004 | March 6, 2019 | | | |
| Young Charles | April 1, 2004 | March 31, 2006 | | | |
| Inside the Marx Brothers | April 1, 2004 | March 31, 2006 | | | |
| King George & Queen Mary: The First Windsors | April 1, 2004 | March 31, 2006 | | | |
| Barbara Stanwyck: Straight Down the Line | November 1, 2004 | October 31, 2006 | | | |
| The Passions of Prince Charles: A King in Waiting | March 1, 2005 | February 28, 2007 | | | |
| Walter Matthau: Diamond in the Rough | April 1, 2005 | March 31, 2007 | | | |
| Mary Shelley: The Birth of Frankenstein | October 15, 2005 | November 14, 2007 | | | |
| Ruth and Billy Graham: What Grace Provides | November 1, 2005 | October 31, 2007 | (Note: As part of Graham/Shea Package in the 1st release.) | | |
| Ruth and Billy Graham: What Grace Provides | April 1, 2013 | March 31, 2015 | (Note: As part of Graham/Shea Package in the 1st release.) | | |
| Edward VIII: From King to Duke | November 1, 2005 | October 31, 2007 | | | |
| Billie Jean King: Rogue Champion | January 1, 2006 | December 31, 2007 | | | |
| Wilder: An American First | February 1, 2006 | January 31, 2018 | | | |
| Jackie Gleason: Genius at Work | March 1, 2006 | March 31, 2009 | (Note: Comedy genre in the 1st release.) | | |
| Jackie Gleason: Genius at Work | November 1, 2009 | December 18, 2011 | (Note: Comedy genre in the 1st release.) | | |
| Sweet Tornado: Margo Jones and the American Theater | March 1, 2006 | February 28, 2016 | | | |
| Erma Bombeck: Legacy of Laughter | May 1, 2006 | April 30, 2018 | | | |
| About Benjamin | September 1, 2006 | August 31, 2015 | | | |
| Rock Hudson: Tall, Dark and Handsome | November 1, 2006 | October 31, 2009 | | | |
| Norwegian Masters: The Lion - Henrik Ibsen | December 1, 2006 | November 30, 2012 | | | |
| Joe Louis: The Boxer Who Beat Hitler | March 1, 2007 | February 28, 2009 | | | |
| Olga: The Last Grand Duchess | March 1, 2007 | February 28, 2009 | | | |
| Journey of the Heart: The Life of Henri Nouwen | April 1, 2007 | March 31, 2011 | | | |
| Seneca Ray Stoddard: An American Original | April 8, 2007 | April 7, 2019 | | | |
| A Castle in Every Heart: The Arto Monaco Story | May 1, 2007 | April 30, 2016 | (Note: Originally titled A Castle in Every Heart: The Life of Arto Marco, Designer of America’s First Theme Park.) | | |
| From Curandera to Chupacabra: The Stories of Rudolfo Anaya | September 1, 2007 | October 15, 2010 | | | |
| Louis Brandeis: The People's Attorney | September 1, 2007 | August 31, 2013 | | | |
| Bertie and Elizabeth | December 31, 2007 | March 31, 2010 | | | |
| Albert Alcalay: Self Portraits | April 1, 2008 | March 31, 2012 | | | |
| Virginia Lee Burton: A Sense of Place | May 1, 2009 | April 30, 2018 | | | |
| Jim Thorpe: World's Greatest Athlete | October 4, 2009 | October 3, 2017 | | | |
| Stokes: An American Dream | November 1, 2009 | October 31, 2017 | | | |

==== 2010s ====
| Title | Premiere date | End date | Note(s) | Legend(s) | Source(s) |
|---|---|---|---|---|---|
| Victor Borge: The Funniest Man in the World | March 1, 2010 | February 29, 2012 | | | |
| Bela Lugosi: The Fallen Vampire | April 1, 2010 | March 31, 2012 | | | |
| The Legend of Pancho Barnes and the Happy Bottom Riding Club | April 14, 2010 | April 13, 2016 | | | |
| A Summer of Birds | September 5, 2010 | September 4, 2016 | | | |
| Mechanic to Millionaire: The Peter Cooper Story | October 3, 2010 | October 2, 2016 | | | |
| John Wooden: The Indiana Story | November 1, 2010 | October 31, 2016 | | | |
| The World of Nat King Cole | August 1, 2011 | July 31, 2013 | | | |
| Karsh is History: Yousuf Karsh and Portrait Photography | September 1, 2011 | August 31, 2013 | | | |
| Cruz Reynoso: Sowing the Seeds of Justice | September 1, 2011 | August 31, 2015 | | ^{LPB} | |
| The Reconstruction of Asa Carter | April 3, 2012 | April 2, 2016 | | ^{ITVS} | |
| Produced by George Martin | August 1, 2013 | July 31, 2015 | (Note: Music & entertainment genre in the 1st release.) | | |
| Produced by George Martin | August 1, 2016 | July 31, 2018 | (Note: Music & entertainment genre in the 1st release.) | | |
| In from the Cold? A Portrait of Richard Burton | September 1, 2013 | August 31, 2015 | | | |
| Christopher Columbus' Maps | October 1, 2013 | March 31, 2015 | | | |
| Wallis Simpson: The Secret Letters | November 1, 2013 | October 31, 2015 | | | |
| Wallis Simpson: The Secret Letters | December 1, 2015 | November 30, 2017 | | | |
| Diana vs the Queen | March 1, 2014 | August 31, 2015 | (Note: The 1st release was planned to end on February 28, 2016.) | | |
| Diana vs the Queen | April 1, 2016 | March 31, 2018 | (Note: The 1st release was planned to end on February 28, 2016.) | | |
| A Year with the Prince of Monaco: Power and Intimacy | August 1, 2014 | July 31, 2016 | | | |
| Göring's Secret: The Story of Hitler's Marshall | September 1, 2015 | August 31, 2017 | | | |
| Göring's Secret: The Story of Hitler's Marshall | October 1, 2017 | September 30, 2018 | | | |
| Stan Lee: With Great Power | November 1, 2015 | October 31, 2017 | | | |
| The Magic of the Diary of Anne Frank | April 1, 2016 | March 31, 2018 | | | |
| Jens Jensen the Living Green | April 1, 2016 | March 31, 2018 | | | |
| Beatrix Potter with Patricia Routledge | October 1, 2016 | September 30, 2018 | | | |
| Mozart in London | January 1, 2017 | December 31, 2018 | | | |
| William Shatner Presents: Chaos on the Bridge | November 1, 2017 | October 31, 2019 | | | |
| Jayhawkers | April 1, 2018 | March 31, 2020 | | ^{APT WORLDWIDE} | |
| Operation Foxley - Mission: Liquidate Hitler | June 30, 2018 | June 29, 2020 | | | |
| A Tale of Two Sisters: The Diary of Anne Frank | August 1, 2018 | July 31, 2020 | | | |
| King George VI: The Man Behind the King's Speech | January 1, 2019 | December 31, 2020 | | | |
| Secrets of the Masons | April 1, 2019 | March 31, 2021 | | | |
| Count Basie: Through His Own Eyes | November 1, 2019 | October 31, 2021 | | | |

==== 2020s ====
| Title | Premiere date | End date | Note(s) | Legend(s) | Source(s) |
|---|---|---|---|---|---|
| Josephine Baker: The Story of an Awakening | December 1, 2020 | November 30, 2022 | | | |
| Josephine Baker: The Story of an Awakening | February 1, 2023 | January 31, 2025 | | | |
| Ganz: How I Lost My Beetle | December 1, 2020 | November 30, 2022 | | | |
| Prince Philip: For Queen and Country | April 9, 2021 | April 8, 2023 | | | |
| The Tale of Granny Mochi: Kuwata Misao | September 1, 2021 | December 31, 2021 | | ^{NHK} | |
| What She Said: The Art of Pauline Kael | January 1, 2022 | December 31, 2023 | | | |
| The Story of Queen Victoria | March 1, 2022 | February 29, 2024 | | | |
| The Queen: Anthology - A Life on Film | April 28, 2022 | April 27, 2024 | | | |
| The Story of Tom Hanks: Hollywood's Mr. Nice Guy | November 1, 2022 | October 31, 2024 | | | |
| Peter Falk Versus Columbo | August 1, 2023 | July 31, 2025 | | | |
| Denzal Washington: American Paradox | April 1, 2024 | March 31, 2026 | | | |
| Restless - Being Paul Newman | April 1, 2024 | March 31, 2026 | | | |
| To Be Takei | May 1, 2024 | April 30, 2026 | | | |
| My King Charles | July 1, 2024 | June 30, 2026 | | | |
| Clint Eastwood: The Last Legend | July 1, 2024 | June 30, 2026 | | | |
| Keanu Reeves: Pop Messiah | November 1, 2024 | October 31, 2026 | | | |
| Sigourney Weaver, The Most Iconic Action Heroine | November 1, 2024 | October 31, 2026 | | | |

=== Aviation/military ===
==== 1980s ====
| Title | Premiere date | End date | Note(s) | Legend(s) | Source(s) |
|---|---|---|---|---|---|
| The Flying Wing: What Happened to It? | November 30, 1980 | February 29, 1984 | | | |
| B-17 Flying Fortress: A Tribute | June 30, 1986 | June 29, 1989 | | | |
| Korea: The Forgotten War | November 1, 1987 | October 31, 1989 | | | |

==== 1990s ====
| Title | Premiere date | End date | Note(s) | Legend(s) | Source(s) |
|---|---|---|---|---|---|
| Honor Squadrons | March 1, 1995 | February 28, 1999 | | | |
| Rain of Ruin: The Bombing of Nagasaki | August 8, 1995 | December 31, 1999 | | | |
| VJ Day: War in the Pacific | August 9, 1995 | August 8, 1998 | | | |
| Heroines of the Sky | December 1, 1996 | March 31, 2000 | | | |
| The Men Who Brought the Dawn | August 1, 1997 | July 31, 1999 | | | |
| The Men Who Brought the Dawn | August 1, 1999 | August 31, 2001 | | | |
| WWII: The Ernie Pyle Story | November 1, 1999 | October 31, 2001 | | | |

==== 2000s ====
| Title | Premiere date | End date | Note(s) | Legend(s) | Source(s) |
|---|---|---|---|---|---|
| The Lucky Ones: Allied Airmen and Buchenwald | April 1, 2000 | March 31, 2002 | | | |
| Wasps and Witches | June 30, 2000 | June 29, 2002 | | | |
| Spies in the Sky | August 1, 2000 | July 31, 2002 | | | |
| Pearl Harbor: A Day of Infamy | November 1, 2001 | October 31, 2003 | | | |
| Pearl Harbor: Two Hours That Changed the World | November 1, 2001 | October 31, 2003 | | | |
| Nickles from Heaven | February 1, 2002 | January 31, 2018 | | | |
| Navy SEALs: The Silent Option | February 1, 2002 | January 31, 2004 | | | |
| Hitler's Atlantic Wall | February 1, 2002 | January 31, 2004 | | | |
| The Raising of the U-534 | June 30, 2002 | June 29, 2004 | | | |
| Through My Sights: A Gunner's View of WWII | June 30, 2002 | June 29, 2005 | | | |
| George Stevens: D-Day to Berlin | November 1, 2002 | October 31, 2004 | | | |
| Pioneers in Aviation | November 10, 2002 | November 9, 2005 | | | |
| America Takes Flight: National Air Tour 1925-1931 | September 1, 2003 | August 31, 2005 | | | |
| The Forgotten Battlefield | November 1, 2003 | October 31, 2005 | | | |
| 21st Century X Planes | February 1, 2004 | January 31, 2006 | | | |
| Tales of the Bow | March 1, 2004 | February 28, 2006 | | | |
| Proud to Serve: The Men and Women of the U.S. Army | March 1, 2004 | March 31, 2007 | (Note: Originally titled Proud to Serve (as a full series).) | | |
| Warship: At War | December 1, 2004 | November 30, 2006 | | | |
| B-17: Flying Legend | April 1, 2005 | March 31, 2007 | | | |
| Running the Gauntlet: Sink the Manchester! | October 1, 2005 | September 30, 2007 | | | |
| War in the Air: The Unseen Enemy | August 1, 2006 | July 31, 2008 | | | |
| The Restorers | November 1, 2006 | October 31, 2009 | (Note: 2003 version.) | | |
| Lancaster at War | April 1, 2007 | March 31, 2009 | | | |
| Spitfire: Birth of a Legend | July 1, 2008 | June 30, 2010 | | | |
| Iwo Jima: 50 Years of Memories | November 1, 2008 | October 31, 2010 | | | |

==== 2010s ====
| Title | Premiere date | End date | Note(s) | Legend(s) | Source(s) |
|---|---|---|---|---|---|
| The Lancaster at War | January 1, 2011 | December 31, 2012 | | | |
| Secrets of the Kursk | April 1, 2012 | March 31, 2014 | | | |
| Lost Nuke | April 1, 2013 | March 31, 2015 | | | |
| Remote Control War | September 1, 2013 | August 31, 2015 | | | |
| Shot Down: Escaping Nazi Europe | October 1, 2014 | September 30, 2016 | | | |
| The Raf Red Arrows: Inside the Bubble | January 1, 2016 | December 31, 2017 | | | |
| Battle of Jutland: The Navy's Bloodiest Day | June 30, 2017 | June 29, 2019 | | | |
| Hitler's England | April 1, 2018 | March 31, 2020 | | | |
| A City at War: Chicago | May 24, 2018 | May 23, 2020 | | | |
| Blackbird: Legacy of Innovation | November 1, 2018 | October 31, 2020 | | | |
| A Bad Deal: My Vietnam War Story | May 14, 2019 | May 13, 2023 | | | |

==== 2020s ====
| Title | Premiere date | End date | Note(s) | Legend(s) | Source(s) |
|---|---|---|---|---|---|
| The Good Nazi | April 1, 2020 | March 31, 2023 | | | |
| Swamp Ghost | November 1, 2020 | October 31, 2022 | | | |
| Hitler's Jurassic Monsters | March 1, 2021 | February 28, 2023 | | | |
| WWII & Cinema | April 1, 2021 | March 31, 2023 | | | |
| Cold War & Cinema | March 1, 2022 | February 29, 2024 | | | |
| The Story of the D-Day Forecast: Three Days in June | March 13, 2023 | March 12, 2025 | | | |

=== Non-fiction ===
==== 2010s ====
| Title | Premiere date | End date | Note(s) | Legend(s) | Source(s) |
|---|---|---|---|---|---|
| Britain's Poshest Nannies | September 1, 2015 | August 31, 2017 | | | |

==== 2020s ====
| Title | Premiere date | End date | Note(s) | Legend(s) | Source(s) |
|---|---|---|---|---|---|
| The Children's Crusade Revisited: Slaughterhouse-Five at 50 | August 12, 2020 | August 11, 2024 | | | |

== See also ==
- List of programs formerly distributed by American Public Television
- List of PBS member stations
- List of programs broadcast by PBS
- List of programs broadcast by PBS Kids
- List of programs broadcast by Create
- List of worldwide programs distributed by American Public Television
