= List of worldwide programs distributed by American Public Television =

The following is a list of worldwide programs currently distributed to public television stations (including PBS affiliates) through American Public Television. There is a separate list for former programming. APT Worldwide is a division of American Public Television, a leading distributor of national television programming to public television stations in the United States.

Legend:
^{APT} American Public Television
^{NETA} NETA (aka National Educational Telecommunications Association)
^{PBS} PBS

== APT Worldwide programming ==
There are currently 210 programs on the list so far.

Title	Episode(s) & Length	Genre(s)	Production Year	Format	Note(s)	Legend(s)	Source(s)
~~1968: The Year that Shaped a Generation~~	1/60	General Documentaries; History	N/A				
1st to Fight: Pacific War Marines	1/60	History; Military	2020	HD		^{APT}	
~~10 Buildings That Changed America~~	1/60	Art & Culture; General Documentaries; History	2013	HD		^{PBS}	
10 That Changed America	7/60	General Documentaries; History; IFE	2013-18	HD		^{PBS}	
4 Wheel Bob	1/60	Biography; General Documentaries	2016	HD		^{APT}	
~~Accordion Dreams~~	1/60	General Documentaries; Performance	2000			^{PBS}	
~~Adventures in the Field~~	13/30	Science Health & Nature	N/A			^{PBS}	
~~Africa's Children~~	1/60	General Documentaries	2000			^{APT}	
After Auschwitz	1/60	History; War Up Close	2018	HD		^{APT}	
~~Alef...Bet...Blast-Off!~~	8/30	Lifestyle	1996-97			^{APT}	
~~Alive From PopTech~~	1/60	Business & Technology; General Documentaries; Science Health & Nature	2006			^{APT}	
America the Bountiful	26/30	Lifestyle	2023-25	HD		^{APT}	
America's Heartland	215/30	Lifestyle; Science Health & Nature	2008-17	HD		^{APT}	
America's Secret War	1/60	History; Military	2017	HD		^{APT}	
America's Socialist Experiment	1/60	History	2020	HD		^{APT}	
~~American Gypsy: A Stranger in Everybody's Land~~	1/56; 1/80	General Documentaries	N/A				
Anahita: A Mother's Journey	1/60	General Documentaries	2022	HD		^{APT}	
Angle of Attack	2/60	General Documentaries; History; Military	2011	HD		^{APT}	
~~Ani DiFranco: Live at Babeville~~	1/60	High Definition; Performance	2008				
~~The Armenians: A Story of Survival~~	1/60	General Documentaries	2001			^{NETA}	
Art Basel: A Portrait	1/30	Art & Culture	2014	HD		^{APT}	
Art Wolfe's Travels to the Edge	26/30	Science Health & Nature	2007-08	HD		^{APT}	
Art Wolfe's Travels to the Edge: Amazing Encounters	1/60	Science Health & Nature	2010	HD		^{APT}	
~~The Artist Toolbox~~	13/30	Art & Culture; Biography	2010	HD		^{APT}	
~~Artist's Table: Jacques Pepin and Itzhak Perlman~~	1/56	Art & Culture; High Definition; Lifestyle	2008			^{APT}	
~~The Artists Workshop~~	13/30	N/A	2000			^{APT}	
~~As We Forgive~~	1/60	Current Affairs; General Documentaries; History	2008				
~~Author of Reform: The Cardinal Suenens Story~~	1/60	N/A	1999			^{APT}	
~~Bag It~~	1/60	Current Affairs; General Documentaries; Science Health & Nature	2010	HD		^{NETA}	
~~Barack Obama Interview Footage~~	N/A	Biography; Current Affairs	2004				
~~Barbecue University with Steven Raichlen~~	39/30	Lifestyle	2002-04			^{APT}	
~~The Battle of Durban II: Israel, Palestine & the United Nations~~	1/60; 1/80	Feature Length; History	2009	HD			
~~The Bay of Pigs~~	1/60	General Documentaries; History	N/A			^{PBS}	
~~Beyond Geek~~	14/30	IFE; Science Health & Nature; Youth	2014-16	HD		^{PBS}	
Bears of Durango	1/60	IFE; Science Health & Nature	2021	HD		^{APT}	
Beauty on the Wing: Life Story of the Monarch Butterfly	1/60	IFE; Science Health & Nature	2012-20	HD		^{APT}	
Behind the Wings	28/30	History; IFE; Science Health & Nature	2019-25	HD		^{NETA}	
Behind the Wings (shorts)	26/Various	History; Science Health & Nature	2017-24	HD		^{NETA}	
~~Ben Shahn: Passion For Justice~~	1/60	Art & Culture; Biography	2001			^{PBS}	
Beneath the Polar Sun	1/60	Science Health & Nature	2023	HD		^{NETA}	
~~The Best Recipes in the World with Mark Bittman of the New York Times~~	13/30	High Definition; Lifestyle	2006			^{APT}	
Betrayed: Surviving An American Concentration Camp	1/60	History; War Up Close	2022	HD		^{APT}	
~~Between the Folds~~	1/60	Art & Culture; General Documentaries; Science Health & Nature	2008	16:9	As part of Independent Lens	^{PBS}	
~~Bill Gottlieb: Riffs~~	1/60	Art & Culture; Biography; General Documentaries; High Definition	2006				
Black Ballerina	1/60	Art & Culture; IFE	2016	HD		^{APT}	
Bob Hope and World War II	1/60	History	2025	HD		^{APT}	
The Bob Ross Experience	1/60	Art & Culture; General Documentaries; IFE	2021	HD		^{APT}	
Bob Ross: The Happy Painter	1/60	Art & Culture; Biography; General Documentaries; IFE	2011	HD		^{APT}	
~~Bonsai People: The Vision of Muhammad Yunus~~	1/60	Business; General Documentaries	2011	HD		^{APT}	
~~Brazelton on Parenting~~	26/30	Lifestyle	1999-2000		Aired on Fox Family from October 16, 2000 to October 27, 2000.		
Breaking Enigma: A World War II Game Changer	1/60	History	2025	HD		^{APT}	
Bridging Divides: Sharing Heartbeats	1/60	General Documentaries	2023	HD		^{APT}	
Broadside	2/60	History; Military	2009	HD		^{APT}	
~~Broken Earth: Humanitarian Demining in Post-Conflict Countries~~	1/60	General Documentaries	2001				
~~Buffett & Gates Go Back to School~~	1/60	General Documentaries; Youth	2006	HD			
The Burren: Heart of Stone	2/60	IFE; Science Health & Nature	2021	HD		^{APT}	
~~Bye-Bye Babushka~~	1/60	General Documentaries	1997			^{APT}	
~~A Celebration of Leonard Bernstein~~	1/90	Performance	2008			^{PBS}	
~~CEO Exchange~~	20/60	Business & Technology	2006-07			^{PBS}	
The Chavis Chronicles	52/30	Current Affairs	2021-22	HD		^{APT}	
~~Change Up~~	1/46	General Documentaries; Sports	2002-03				
~~Changing Nature: Population and Environment at a Crossroads~~	1/60	N/A	2002			^{APT}	
Changing Seas	64/30	IFE; Science Health & Nature	2010-25	HD		^{APT}	
~~A Chef's Life~~	13/30	Lifestyle	2013-14			^{PBS}	
~~Children's Hospital~~	6/60	General Documentaries; Science Health & Nature	N/A				
~~China 21~~	1/60	General Documentaries	2002			^{APT}	
China: Frame by Frame	1/60	History	2023	HD		^{NETA}	
~~A Christmas Carol: The Concert~~	1/90	Art & Culture; Performance	2013	HD			
~~Christmas in Norway with the St. Olaf Choir~~	1/60	Performance	2013	HD			
~~Christina Cooks~~	130/30	Lifestyle	1992; 1998; 1999; 2000 more			^{APT}	
Christina Cooks: Back to the Cutting Board	39/30	Lifestyle	2022-24	HD		^{APT}	
~~Circus Dreams~~	1/60; 1/80	Art & Culture; Feature Length; General Documentaries; Youth	2011	HD		^{APT}	
~~Citizen Hong Kong~~	1/60; 1/90	General Documentaries	1999				
Civil War: The Untold Story	5/60	History; Military	2013	HD		^{APT}	
~~Class C: The Only Game in Town~~	1/88	Feature Length; General Documentaries; Sports; Youth	2008			^{NETA}	
Code Name: Ayalon	1/60	History	2023	HD		^{APT}	
~~Coexist~~	1/60	Current Affairs; General Documentaries	2014			^{APT}	
Coffee: The Drink that Changed America	1/60	History; Lifestyle	2016	HD			
~~Con Artist~~	1/84	Art & Culture; Biography; General Documentaries	2009	HD		^{PBS}	
Confluence	3/60	Art & Culture; Biography; General Documentaries; IFE; Science Health & Nature	2024	HD		^{APT}	
Conscious Living	23/30	IFE; Lifestyle; Science Health & Nature	2021-22	HD	A second season of this program was originally going to be distributed by American Public Television (APT) in 2022. However, it was distributed by NETA (aka National Educational Telecommunications Association) for any reasons.	^{NETA}	
~~The Cooking Odyssey~~	26/30	Lifestyle	2010-14	HD		^{NETA}	
Coronation Girls	1/90	History	2024	HD		^{APT}	
Corpsman! Pearl Harbor	1/60	History	2025	HD		^{APT}	
~~Cosmic Journey: The Voyager Interstellar Mission and Message~~	1/120; 1/92 or 2/45	Science Health & Nature	2003			^{PBS}	
A Craftsman's Legacy	52/30	Art & Culture; IFE; Lifestyle	2014-17	HD		^{APT}	
~~A Crisis of Faith~~	1/60	General Documentaries	2004			^{APT}	
The Crossing	1/40	General Documentaries	2021	HD			
~~Crossing Arizona~~	1/60; 1/75	Current Affairs; General Documentaries	2005			^{PBS}	
Cuba: The Forgotten Revolution	1/60; 1/90	History	2014	HD		^{APT}	
~~The Cure~~	1/60	General Documentaries; Science Health & Nature	2004			^{APT}	
The Cure for Hate: Bearing Witness to Auschwitz	1/60	Current Affairs; History	2024	HD		^{APT}	
Curious Traveler	73/30	History; IFE; Lifestyle	2014-24	HD		^{APT}	
CyberWork and the American Dream	1/60	Business; General Documentaries; Science Health & Nature	2018	HD		^{NETA}	
D-Day At Pointe-du-Hoc	1/60	History; Military	2019	HD		^{APT}	
D-Day: Over Normandy	1/60	History; Military	2017	HD		^{APT}	
~~The Dabbawallas~~	1/60	General Documentaries	2002			^{APT}	
Dad's Secret War: France 1944	1/60	History; Military	2024	HD		^{APT}	
~~David Broza at Masada: The Sunrise Concert~~	1/60	Performance	2007	HD			
Day of Days: June 6, 1944	1/60	History; Military	2014	HD	Originally titled Day of Days: June 6, 1944 - American Soldiers Remember D-Day	^{APT}	
~~The Day It Snowed in Miami~~	1/90	General Documentaries; History	2014	HD		^{APT}	
Dear Albania	1/60	General Documentaries; Lifestyle	2015	HD		^{APT}	
~~Death: The Trip of a Lifetime~~	4/60	Science Health & Nature	N/A			^{PBS}	
~~Democracy on Deadline: The Global Struggle for an Independent Press~~	1/120; 2/60	Current Affairs; General Documentaries	2006		As part of Independent Lens	^{PBS}	
~~Desperate Hours~~	1/65	N/A	1998			^{APT}	
Desert Dreams: Celebrating Five Seasons in the Sonoran Desert	1/60 or 2/30	IFE; Science Health & Nature	2018	HD		^{NETA}	
~~The Desert Speaks~~	98/30	Science Health & Nature	2002-10	HD		^{APT}^{NETA}^{PBS}	
~~Digital Media: New Learners of the 21st Century~~	1/60	General Documentaries; Science Health & Nature; Youth	2010	HD			
~~Disconnected~~	1/60	Business & Technology; General Documentaries	2008			^{PBS}	
Discover Beethoven's Fifth	1/60	Art & Culture	2010	HD		^{APT}	
Discover the Firebird	1/60	Art & Culture; IFE	2019	HD		^{APT}	
Discover Vivaldi's Four Seasons	2/60	Art & Culture; IFE	N/A	HD		^{APT}	
~~Discovery Concert: Bach to the Future~~	1/60	Art & Culture; Performance	2002			^{APT}	
Dismantling Democracy	3/60	Current Affairs	2020	HD		^{APT}	
~~Dissonance & Harmony: Arabic Music Goes West~~	1/60	General Documentaries; Performance	2007			^{PBS}	
~~Donna's Day~~	65/30	Lifestyle	1996-98; 2006			^{APT}	
Doug's Geology Journal	5/30	Science Health & Nature	2021	HD		^{APT}	
Dream of Europe	7/30	Lifestyle	2024	HD		^{APT}	
Dream of Italy	19/30	IFE; Lifestyle	2015-23	HD		^{APT}	
Dream of Italy: Travel, Transform and Thrive	1/60	IFE; Lifestyle	2020	HD		^{APT}	
~~Dreamland~~	1/60	Business & Technology; General Documentaries	2011			^{APT}	
~~Earth: The Operators' Manual~~	1/60	Current Affairs; Science Health & Nature	2011	HD		^{PBS}	
Earthrise: The First Lunar Voyage	1/60; 1/75	History; Science Health & Nature	2014	16:9		^{APT}	
~~Easy Like Water~~	1/60	Business; Current Affairs; General Documentaries; Science Health & Nature	2012	HD		^{APT}	
~~Eisenhower's Secret War~~	2/60	Biography; History	2012			^{APT}	
~~Electric Money~~	3/60	Business & Technology	N/A				
~~Electrum: Science as Art~~	1/30	Art & Culture; General Documentaries; Science Health & Nature	2000			^{APT}	
Eliades Ochoa: From Cuba to the World	1/60	Art & Culture; Biography; IFE	2020	HD		^{APT}	
Eliades Ochoa: Live at La Casa de la Trova	1/60	IFE; Performance	2021	HD		^{APT}	
Ellie's Real Good Food	26/30	Lifestyle	2016-17	HD		^{APT}	
Elmore Leonard: But Don't Try to Write	1/60	Art & Culture; Biography; General Documentaries; IFE	2022	HD		^{APT}	
Elvis and the USS Arizona	1/60	History; IFE	2021	HD		^{APT}	
Empire Builders	26/60	History	2018-22	HD	Also includes Empire Builders: Mexico.	^{APT}	
~~Energy Quest USA~~	1/60	General Documentaries; Science Health & Nature	2012	HD		^{PBS}	
~~Equitrekking~~	35/30	Lifestyle	2006-12	HD		^{APT}	
EVA: A-7063	1/60; 1/90	Biography; History; War Up Close	2017	HD		^{APT}	
~~Everest: A Climb for Peace~~	1/60	General Documentaries; Science Health & Nature	2008			^{APT}	
~~Évocateur: The Morton Downey Jr. Movie~~	1/90	Art & Culture; Biography; Feature Length; General Documentaries	2012	HD			
Expeditions with Patrick McMillan	49/30	Science Health & Nature	2012-19	HD		^{APT}	
~~Eye of the Beholder: The Artistry of James Hubbell~~	1/46	Art & Culture	2002			^{APT}	
Fall in Love With Music	8/30	Art & Culture	2015	HD		^{APT}	
Family Travel with Colleen Kelly	23/30	Lifestyle	2013-15	HD		^{APT}	
Fannie's Last Supper	1/60	History; Lifestyle	2010	HD		^{APT}	
A Final Landing on Iwo Jima	1/60	History; Military	2024	HD		^{APT}	
Finding Traction	1/60	General Documentaries	2014	HD		^{NETA}	
~~Finding Your Element with Sir Ken Robinson~~	1/60	Science Health & Nature	N/A	HD		^{APT}	
Fixed: The Science/Fiction of Human Enhancement	1/60	Science Health & Nature	2013	HD		^{APT}	
~~The Flute Player~~	1/60	Art & Culture; General Documentaries	2003			^{PBS}	
Flying the Feathered Edge: The Bob Hoover Project	1/60; 1/86	Biography; History; IFE	2021	HD			
~~Follow My Voice: With the Music of Hedwig~~	1/100	Art & Culture; General Documentaries; Performance	2006				
For Love of Liberty: The Story of America's Black Patriots	2/120	History; Military	2001-09	HD		^{APT}	
~~Four Seasons Lodge~~	1/60	History	2008	HD		^{APT}	
Frank Ferrante's Groucho	1/90	IFE; Performance	2022	HD		^{APT}	
~~Fresco~~	1/60	Art & Culture; General Documentaries	1993-99			^{PBS}	
~~Frontiers of Medicine~~	39/30	N/A	1999			^{PBS}	
~~Frontrunners~~	1/60; 1/83	General Documentaries	2008				
Frozen Obsession	1/60	Current Affairs; General Documentaries; IFE; Science Health & Nature	2020	4K; HD		^{NETA}	
~~Gandhi's Awakening~~	1/60	Biography; General Documentaries; History	2017	HD		^{APT}	
~~Gandhi's Gift~~	1/60	Biography; General Documentaries; History	2017	HD		^{APT}	
~~Get Off Your Knees: The John Robinson Story~~	1/60	Biography; General Documentaries; Science Health & Nature	2009			^{PBS}	
~~The Gettysburg Story~~	1/60	History	2013	HD		^{APT}	
Glacier Park's Night of the Grizzlies	1/90	General Documentaries; Science Health & Nature	2010	HD		^{APT}	
~~Global Health Frontiers: Dark Forest, Black Fly~~	1/60	Current Affairs; Science Health & Nature	2012	HD		^{APT}	
~~Global Health Frontiers: Foul Water, Fiery Serpent~~	1/60	Current Affairs; Science Health & Nature	2012	HD		^{APT}	
~~Global Health Frontiers: Trachoma, Defeating a Blinding Curse~~	1/60	Current Affairs; Science Health & Nature	2014	HD		^{APT}	
Global Reef Expedition	6/30	IFE; Science Health & Nature	2017	HD			
~~Global Tribe~~	3/30	Art & Culture; Lifestyle	2002			^{PBS}	
Golden Eagles: Witnesses to a Changing West	1/60	Science Health & Nature	2021	4K; HD		^{NETA}	
Grandpa's War Story Goes Viral	1/60	History; IFE; Military	2020	HD		^{APT}	
~~Grannies on Safari~~	6/30	Lifestyle	2006-11	HD		^{APT}	
~~Great Lodges of the National Parks~~	2/60	Lifestyle; Science Health & Nature	2008	HD		^{PBS}	
~~Great Plains: America's Lingering Wild~~	2/60	Science Health & Nature	2013	HD			
Great White Shark: New Perspectives on an Ancient Predator	1/60	IFE; Science Health & Nature	2019	4K; HD		^{NETA}	
~~A Great Wonder: Lost Children of Sudan~~	1/61	General Documentaries	May 2003			^{PBS}	
~~Green Builders~~	1/60	General Documentaries; Lifestyle; Science Health & Nature	2008-09			^{PBS}	
Growing a Greener World	118/30	IFE; Lifestyle; Science Health & Nature	2010-20	HD		^{APT}	
~~Growing Cities~~	1/60	Lifestyle; Science Health & Nature	2013	HD		^{APT}	
~~A Guitarscape Planet~~	1/75	High Definition; Performance	N/A			^{APT}	
~~A Gullwing at Twilight: The Bonneville Ride of John Fitch~~	1/60	Biography; General Documentaries; Sports	2005			^{APT}	
Hacking Your Mind	4/60	IFE; Science Health & Nature	2020	HD		^{PBS}	
~~Hanford~~	1/60	History	2014	HD		^{NETA}	
Happy Holidays with the Boston Pops	1/60	IFE; Performance	2016	HD		^{APT}	
~~Head Games: The Global Concussion Crisis~~	1/75	Current Affairs; Feature Length; General Documentaries; Science Health & Nature; Sports	2014	HD			
Her War, Her Story: World War II	1/60	History; War Up Close	2022	HD		^{APT}	
The Highpointers with the Bargo Brothers	5/30	IFE; Lifestyle	2023	HD		^{NETA}	
The Himalaya Connection	1/60	Science Health & Nature	2017	HD		^{APT}	
Hitler's Mein Kampf: Prelude to the Holocaust	1/60	History; Military	2022	HD			
Higgins Ridge	1/60	General Documentaries; History	2023	HD		^{PBS}	
~~The Hobart Shakespeareans~~	1/60	Art & Culture; General Documentaries	2005		As part of POV	^{PBS}	
~~Hollywood's Magic Night~~	1/60	Art & Culture; General Documentaries	2005			^{APT}	
~~HomeStyles~~	8/30	Lifestyle	2000		This program was originally going to be distributed by American Public Television (APT) in 2001. However, it was distributed by PBS member stations for any reasons.		
~~How to Cook Everything~~	13/30	High Definition; Lifestyle	2005			^{APT}	
~~How Wall Street Works~~	1/40	N/A	1990				
~~The Hydrogen Age~~	1/60	General Documentaries; Science Health & Nature	2004				
~~Ideal World~~	1/60; 1/85	Feature Length; Science Health & Nature	2008			^{APT}	
~~The Illness & the Odyssey~~	1/60	Science Health & Nature	2013	HD			
~~Imelda: Steel Butterfly~~	1/60	N/A					
The Inn at Little Washington: A Delicious Documentary	1/60	Art & Culture; General Documentaries; IFE; Lifestyle	2019	HD			
~~Innovators: Lessons from the Social Sector~~	1/60	Business & Technology; General Documentaries; High Definition	N/A				
~~Is America in Retreat?~~	1/60	General Documentaries	2017	HD		^{NETA}	
Inside High Noon	1/60	Art & Culture; General Documentaries; IFE	2022	HD		^{APT}	
Invisible Threads: From Wireless to War	1/90; 2/60	History	2022	HD		^{APT}	
~~Islands Without Cars~~	12/30	IFE; Lifestyle	2014-22	HD		^{APT}	
J Schwanke's Life in Bloom	54/30	IFE; Lifestyle	2020-23	HD		^{APT}	
Jack Taylor: The Enterprise	1/60	Biography; History; Military	2021	HD		^{APT}	
~~Jackie Robinson: A Life Story~~	1/60	General Documentaries; Sports	2004			^{APT}	
Jayhawkers	1/106	Biography; History; IFE	2014	HD		^{APT}	
Jazzy Vegetarian	108/30	Lifestyle	2011-21	HD		^{NETA}	
~~Jeff Tweedy: Sunken Treasure - Live in the Pacific Northwest~~	1/90	Performance	2006				
~~Joshua Bell Presents Musical Gifts~~	1/60	Performance	2013			^{APT}	
Journey Home to the USS Arizona	1/60	History; War Up Close	2017	HD		^{APT}	
~~The Journey of the Butterfly: The Legacy~~	1/60	N/A				^{APT}	
The Joy of Painting with Bob Ross	389/30	IFE; Lifestyle	1982-94	16:9		^{APT}	
~~Kansas to Kandahar: Citizen Soldiers at War~~	1/90	Current Affairs; General Documentaries	2007		As part of America at a Crossroads	^{PBS}	
Kasturba Gandhi: Accidental Activist	1/60	Biography; General Documentaries; History	2022	HD		^{APT}	
~~Katie Brown Workshop~~	113/30	Lifestyle	2006-11	HD		^{APT}	
Keeping Score	9/60 docs, 8/Various concert	Art & Culture; Performance	2006-11	HD			
The Kennedy Half-Century	1/60	History	2013	HD		^{APT}	
~~The Kitchen Sessions with Charlie Trotter~~	39/30	N/A	1999-2002			^{APT}	
Landslide: The Presidency of Herbert Hoover	1/62	Biography; General Documentaries; History	2009/2022	HD		^{PBS}	
The Last Artifact	1/60	History; Science Health & Nature	2019-20	HD		^{APT}	
Laura Flanders & Friends	52/30	Current Affairs	2024	HD		^{APT}	
~~The Laura Flanders Show~~	75/30	Current Affairs	2020-22	HD		^{APT}	
~~Legends of Airpower~~	52/30	General Documentaries; History	2000-03			^{APT}^{NETA}	
~~Leif Eriksson - The Man Who Almost Changed the World~~	1/60	General Documentaries; High Definition	2000			^{APT}	
Let There Be Light	1/60	Art & Culture	2015	HD		^{APT}	
~~Lidia's Family Table~~	26/30	Lifestyle	2005			^{APT}	
~~Lidia's Italy~~	26/30	Lifestyle	2007			^{APT}	
Lifeline: Pearl Harbor's Unknown Hero	1/90	History; Military	2018	HD		^{APT}	
~~Lime Rock Park: The Secret Valley of Racing~~	1/60	General Documentaries; Sports	2001			^{PBS}	
~~The Linguists~~	1/60	Art & Culture; General Documentaries; History	2008	HD			
~~Linus Pauling~~	1/60	Biography; General Documentaries; Science Health & Nature	N/A	HD			
~~Lives Together, Worlds Apart~~	1/60	General Documentaries	2000			^{APT}	
~~Living in Emergency: Stories of Doctors Without Borders~~	1/60; 1/90	Current Affairs; Feature Length; General Documentaries; Science Health & Nature	2009	HD			
~~Loreena McKennitt: A Moveable Musical Feast~~	1/30	Art & Culture; Performance	2008	HD		^{APT}	
~~Loreena McKennitt: Nights from the Alhambra~~	1/35; 1/45; 1/52; 1/99	Performance	2007	HD		^{APT}	
~~Loreena McKennitt: No Journey's End~~	1/27	Performance	1996			^{APT}	
~~Los Romeros: The Royal Family of the Guitar~~	1/60	Art & Culture; Performance	N/A			^{PBS}	
~~The Lost Bird Project~~	1/60	Art & Culture; General Documentaries; Science Health & Nature	2013	HD		^{APT}	
~~Lost Treasures of Christianity: The Ancient Monuments of Armenia~~	1/30	Art & Culture	1999			^{APT}	
Love Wins Over Hate	1/60	General Documentaries	2020	HD		^{APT}	
Lucky Chow	36/30	IFE; Lifestyle	2015-24	HD		^{APT}	
~~Make:~~	10/30	Business & Technology; High Definition; Lifestyle; Science Health & Nature	2008			^{APT}	
~~Make48~~	38/30	Business; IFE; Science Health & Nature	2017-20	HD		^{APT}	
~~Manhood & Violence: Fatal Peril~~	1/60	General Documentaries; Science Health & Nature	2003			^{APT}	
~~Manifest Destiny~~	Three episodes - 2/60 and 1/90	History	2011	HD		^{NETA}	
~~Mariachi High~~	1/60	Art & Culture; General Documentaries; Youth	2012	HD		^{PBS}	
~~Maverick's: A Documentary Film~~	1/60	General Documentaries; Sports	1998			^{APT}	
~~May Earth Live: A Journey through the Hawaiian Forest~~	1/60	General Documentaries; Science Health & Nature	2000				
Me, Dorothy...and This Road to Oz	1/60	Art & Culture; IFE	2018	HD		^{NETA}	
Merrill's Marauders: They Volunteered for This	1/60	History; Military	2022	HD		^{APT}	
~~Mexico: One Plate at a Time with Rick Bayless~~	143/30 SD; 52/30 HD	Lifestyle	2000-15	HD; SD	Originally titled Frontera Cooking in Spring 2000	^{APT}	
~~MHz Presents~~	51/30	Performance	2000-03 13/30 are in post production for season 400			^{APT}	
~~Mineral Explorers~~	6/30	Science Health & Nature	2014	HD		^{NETA}	
The Misty Experiment: The Secret Battle for the Ho Chi Minh Trail	1/60	History; Military	2022	HD		^{APT}	
~~Modern Ninja: The Last Grandmaster~~	1/60	General Documentaries; IFE	2023	HD			
Modern Pioneering with Georgia Pellegrini	16/30	Lifestyle	2020-24	HD		^{APT}	
~~Mollie Katzen's Cooking Show~~	65/30	N/A	1994-2000			^{APT}	
Most Valuable Players	1/96	Art & Culture; General Documentaries	2011	HD			
~~Murder House~~	1/60	General Documentaries; High Definition; Science Health & Nature	N/A			^{APT}	
~~Musical Landscape Specials~~	3/Various	High Definition	N/A				
~~My Future Baby: Breakthroughs in Modern Fertility~~	1/60	General Documentaries; Science Health & Nature	2012	HD			
My Greek Table with Diane Kochilas	52/30	IFE; Lifestyle	2017-22	HD		^{APT}	
~~Nat Turner: A Troublesome Property~~	1/60	Biography; General Documentaries; History	2005			^{PBS}	
~~Natural America~~	13/30	Science Health & Nature	N/A	HD			
Nazi Law: Legally Blind	1/60	History; Military	2015-16	HD			
The New Fire	1/60	Science Health & Nature	2017-18	HD			
~~The New Heroes~~	4/60	Business & Technology; General Documentaries	2005			^{PBS}	
~~New Jewish Cuisine~~	66/30; 78/30	Lifestyle	1998-2000; 2002			^{APT}	
~~The New Orleans Concert: The Music of America's Soul~~	1/60; 1/75	High Definition; Performance	N/A			^{PBS}	
~~The New Recruits~~	1/60	Business & Technology; Current Affairs; General Documentaries	2010	HD		^{PBS}	
New Scandinavian Cooking	33/30	Lifestyle	2015-24	HD		^{APT}	
~~New Scandinavian Cooking with Andreas Viestad~~	39/30	Lifestyle	2003-06	SD		^{APT}	
~~New Scandinavian Cooking with Claus Meyer~~	13/30	Lifestyle	2006	SD		^{APT}	
~~New Scandinavian Cooking with Tina Nordström~~	13/30	Lifestyle	2005	SD		^{APT}	
~~New York City Ballet: Bringing Balanchine Back~~	1/52; 1/56; 1/80	Art & Culture; General Documentaries; High Definition; Performance	N/A			^{APT}	
~~Niagara Falls~~	1/60	General Documentaries; High Definition; History; Science Health & Nature	2006			^{APT}	
~~Nightly Business Report~~	N/A					^{APT}^{PBS}	
~~No Evidence of Disease~~	1/60	Science Health & Nature	2012-13	HD		^{APT}	
~~Nourish: Food + Community~~	1/30	General Documentaries; Lifestyle; Science Health & Nature	2009				
Ocean Invaders	1/60	Science Health & Nature	2022	HD	As part of NOVΛ	^{PBS}	
An Ocean Mystery: The Missing Catch	1/46 plus three extra segments to lengthen if needed	Science Health & Nature	2015-17	4K; HD			
Olympic Pride, American Prejudice	1/60	History	2016	HD		^{APT}	
Omaha Beach: Honor and Sacrifice	1/60	History; Military	2014	HD		^{APT}	
~~On Meditation~~	1/35; 1/70	Lifestyle; Science Health & Nature	2014	HD		^{APT}	
~~One Bite of the Apple: A Portrait of the Artist Edwina Sandys~~	1/60	Art & Culture; General Documentaries	2003			^{APT}	
~~One World~~	6/60; 6/90	Lifestyle	1997-2000		Also includes One World: Finland in the International Marketplace and One World: Japan.	^{APT}	
Orchestrating Change	1/60; 1/85	Art & Culture; IFE; Science Health & Nature	2020	HD		^{APT}	
Osiris REx: Countdown to Launch	1/30	Science Health & Nature	2017	HD		^{APT}	
Ottomans vs Christians: Battle for Europe	3/60	History	2010	HD		^{APT}	
Ottomans vs Christians: Battle for the Mediterranean	3/60	History	2010	HD		^{APT}	
~~Out of the Ashes: Recovering the Lost Library of Herculaneum~~	1/60	History; Science Health & Nature	2003	HD		^{APT}	
~~Out on a Limb~~	1/60	Current Affairs; General Documentaries; Science Health & Nature	2012	HD		^{NETA}	
Outside: Beyond the Lens	36/30	IFE; Lifestyle; Science Health & Nature	2019-25	4K; HD		^{APT}	
~~Over Alaska~~	1/60	General Documentaries	2001				
~~Over...~~	7/60; 1/80; 1/45; 1/40; 1/30; 1/8	General Documentaries; High Definition; Science Health & Nature	1991-2002		This program includes Over New England, Over Florida, Over California, Washington, D.C., Over America, Over Arizona, Over Philadelphia, Over St. Louis, Over Beautiful British Columbia, Over Chicago, Washington the Beautiful, and Over Alaska.	^{PBS}	
~~Painting the Town with Eric Dowdle~~	13/30	Lifestyle	2014	HD		^{APT}	
Paleo Sleuths	1/60	History; Science Health & Nature	2016	N/A		^{APT}	
Parkland: Healing a Community and a Nation	1/60	Current Affairs; General Documentaries	2018-19	HD		^{APT}	
Pathways to Invention	1/60	General Documentaries; IFE; Science Health & Nature	2022	HD		^{APT}	
Peleliu: WWII's Most Well-Preserved Battlefield	1/60	History	2024	HD		^{APT}	
~~People in Motion~~	3/60	Science Health & Nature	1995				
People of the North	10/30	Lifestyle	2022	HD		^{APT}	
Perfect 36: When Women Won the Vote	1/30	History	2016	HD		^{APT}	
~~Perfect Day~~	13/30	Lifestyle	2007			^{APT}	
~~Perfect Illusions: Eating Disorders and The Family~~	1/60	Current Affairs; General Documentaries; Science Health & Nature	2002-03			^{PBS}	
~~The Perfect Puppy Guide~~	1/60	N/A	2000			^{APT}	
~~Peter Drucker: An Intellectual Journey~~	1/60	Business & Technology; General Documentaries	2002			^{APT}	
~~Pets: Part of the Family~~	13/30	N/A	1999-2000			^{APT}	
~~Phoenix Mars Mission: Ashes to Ice~~	1/60	General Documentaries; History; Science Health & Nature	2007	HD		^{PBS}	
~~Phoenix Mars Mission: Onto the Ice~~	1/60	General Documentaries; History; Science Health & Nature	2010	HD		^{APT}	
The Piping Plovers of Moonlight Bay	1/60	General Documentaries; Science Health & Nature	2024	HD		^{APT}	
~~The Pit~~	1/60	Business & Technology	2009	HD		^{APT}	
~~Playing for Real~~	1/30; 1/60	Art & Culture; General Documentaries; Performance	N/A			^{APT}	
Playing Frisbee in North Korea	1/60	General Documentaries; History; IFE	2020	HD		^{APT}	
The Portillo Expedition: Mystery On Bougainville Island	1/90	History; Military	2016	HD		^{APT}	
~~Portrait of a Radical: The Jesus Movement~~	1/50	General Documentaries	2000				
Portraits in Architecture	6/30	Art & Culture; IFE	2018	HD		^{APT}	
~~The Power of Choice: The Life and Ideas of Milton Friedman~~	1/60; 1/90	Biography; Business & Technology	2006				
~~The Power of Forgiveness~~	1/60	General Documentaries; Science Health & Nature	2007				
~~Power Shift: Energy + Sustainability~~	1/30	Business & Technology; Current Affairs; General Documentaries; Lifestyle; Science Health & Nature	N/A				
~~Powering the Planet~~	1/60	Current Affairs; General Documentaries; Science Health & Nature	2011	HD		^{PBS}	
~~Primal Grill with Steven Raichlen~~	39/30	Lifestyle	2008-10	Seasons I and II: SD widescreen (can be unpconverted to HD); Season III: HD		^{APT}	
Project Asteroid: Mapping Bennu	1/30	Science Health & Nature	2017	HD		^{APT}	
~~The Promise of Play~~	3/60	N/A	2000			^{APT}	
~~Quest for the Grail: The Western Path~~	1/60	General Documentaries	2002				
~~Racing to Zero~~	1/60	Science Health & Nature	2014	HD		^{NETA}	
The Reagan Presidency	3/60	Biography; History	2012	HD		^{APT}	
Real Road Adventures with Jeff Wilson	6/30	IFE; Lifestyle	2022	HD		^{APT}	
~~Remaking American Medicine: Health Care for the 21st Century~~	4/60	Current Affairs; General Documentaries; Science Health & Nature	2006			^{PBS}	
Remembering Leonard Nimoy	1/60	Biography; IFE	2016	HD		^{APT}	
~~Renoir to Rothko: The Eye of Duncan Phillips~~	1/60	Art & Culture; Biography; High Definition	1999			^{APT}	
~~Reportero~~	1/60	Current Affairs; General Documentaries	2012	HD	As part of POV	^{PBS}	
~~Rescue in the Philippines: Refuge from the Holocaust~~	1/60	History	2013	HD		^{APT}	
~~Return to the USS Atlanta: Defender of Guadalcanal~~	1/60	History	2012	HD			
~~Richard Garriott: Man on a Mission~~	1/60; 1/90	Biography; General Documentaries; Science Health & Nature	2008-09	HD			
Rick Steves Art Bites	96/various short lengths (one to six minutes)	Art & Culture; History	2024	HD		^{APT}	
Rick Steves Art of Europe	6/60 series or six one hour specials	Art & Culture; History; IFE	2022	HD		^{APT}	
Rick Steves Best of the Alps	1/60	IFE; Lifestyle	2021	HD		^{APT}	
Rick Steves Egypt: Yesterday & Today	1/60	History; IFE; Lifestyle	2020	HD		^{APT}	
Rick Steves Experiencing Europe	1/60	Lifestyle	2024	HD		^{APT}	
Rick Steves Hunger and Hope	1/60	Current Affairs; General Documentaries	2019	HD		^{APT}	
Rick Steves Iceland	1/60	Lifestyle	2024	HD		^{APT}	
Rick Steves: Luther and the Reformation	1/60	History	2016	HD		^{APT}	
Rick Steves Poland	1/60	Lifestyle	2024	HD		^{APT}	
Rick Steves Rome: Eternally Engaging	1/60	Lifestyle	2012	HD		^{APT}	
Rick Steves' Europe	135/30	IFE; Lifestyle	2002-25	HD		^{APT}	
~~Rick Steves' Europe: A Symphonic Journey~~	1/60	Art & Culture	2013	HD	2013 version	^{APT}	
Rick Steves' Europe: A Symphonic Journey	1/60	Art & Culture	2025	HD	2025 version	^{APT}	
~~Rick Steves' Iran~~	1/60	High Definition; Lifestyle	2009			^{APT}	
Rick Steves' Special: Andalucía: The Best of Southern Spain	1/60	IFE; Lifestyle	2017	HD		^{APT}	
Rick Steves' Special: Cruising the Mediterranean	1/60	IFE; Lifestyle	2018	HD		^{APT}	
Rick Steves' Special: European Christmas	1/60	Lifestyle	2005	N/A		^{APT}	
Rick Steves' Special: European Easter	1/60	IFE; Lifestyle	2015	HD		^{APT}	
Rick Steves' Special: European Festivals	1/60	IFE; Lifestyle	2017	HD		^{APT}	
Rick Steves' Special: The Story of Fascism in Europe	1/60	History	2017-18	HD		^{APT}	
Right Footed	1/60; 1/82	Biography; General Documentaries; IFE; Science Health & Nature	2011-14; 2015	HD			
~~Right to Risk: A 15 Day Journey through Arizona's Grand Canyon~~	1/60	General Documentaries; Science Health & Nature	2006			^{APT}	
A Ripple of Hope	1/60	History	2009	HD		^{APT}	
Rise of the Freemen	1/110	General Documentaries; History	2022	HD		^{APT}	
~~The Road to Reconciliation~~	1/60	General Documentaries	1998-2001			^{APT}	
Road to the Globe: Troilus & Cressida	1/60	Art & Culture	2015	HD			
~~Road to Victory~~	2/60; 1/90	History	N/A	HD			
Rommel: The Soldier, the Son and Hitler	1/60	History; Military	2021	HD			
Saving Sea Turtles: Preventing Extinction	1/60	Science Health & Nature	2014-16	HD		^{NETA}	
~~The Science of Healing with Dr. Esther Sternberg~~	1/60	General Documentaries; High Definition; Science Health & Nature	2009			^{PBS}	
The Seabees on Iwo Jima	1/60	History; Military	2023	HD		^{APT}	
Searching: Our Quest for Meaning in the Age of Science	1/100 or 3/60	IFE; Science Health & Nature	2022	HD		^{APT}	
~~Secrets from the Love Doctor with Dr Terri Orbuch~~	1/60	Lifestyle; Science Health & Nature	2013	HD		^{APT}	
Secrets of Sacred Architecture	1/60	Art & Culture; General Documentaries; IFE	2015	HD		^{APT}	
~~Secrets of the Sequence~~	26/30	Science Health & Nature	2001-02			^{APT}	
~~Seeing in the Dark~~	1/60	General Documentaries; Science Health & Nature	2007	HD		^{PBS}	
~~Seize The Day~~	1/60	General Documentaries; Sports	N/A			^{APT}	
~~Senator Obama Goes to Africa~~	1/60	Biography; Current Affairs; General Documentaries	2006-07				
~~September's Children~~	1/60	General Documentaries; Science Health & Nature	2004			^{APT}	
Sex, Lies and the Priesthood	1/56	Biography; Current Affairs; History	2021	HD			
Shanghai 1937: Where World War II Began	1/60	History; Military	2018	HD		^{APT}	
~~Sharon Isbin: Troubadour~~	1/60	Art & Culture; Biography; Performance	2013	HD		^{APT}	
A Short History of the English Garden	2/60	History	2021	HD		^{APT}	
A Short History of the Moors	1/60	History	2015	HD			
~~Showbiz is My Life~~	1/52	Art & Culture	2001				
Silent Sacrifice: Stories of Japanese American Incarceration	2/60; 1/120	History; War Up Close	2018	HD		^{APT}	
Since: The Bombing of Pan Am Flight 103	1/90	General Documentaries; History	2015	HD			
~~The Sixties: The Years that Shaped a Generation~~	1/120	General Documentaries; History	N/A			^{PBS}	
~~SkyWeek interstitials~~	52x5; 52x3; 52x1	Science Health & Nature	2011-14			^{APT}^{PBS}	
~~Small Fortunes: Microcredit and the Future of Poverty~~	1/60	Business & Technology; General Documentaries; High Definition	2005			^{PBS}	
Smart Travels - Pacific Rim with Rudy Maxa	13/30	Lifestyle	2012	HD		^{APT}	
Smart Travels: Europe with Rudy Maxa	52/30	Lifestyle	2000-04	HD		^{APT}	
~~Sold: Fighting the New Global Slave Trade~~	1/52	Current Affairs; General Documentaries	2009	HD			
~~Songs of the Homeland~~	1/60	General Documentaries; Performance	N/A			^{PBS}	
~~Southern Belle~~	1/60	General Documentaries; History; Youth	2010	HD		^{APT}	
Stand Together as One	1/60	Art & Culture; General Documentaries; History; IFE	2025	HD		^{APT}	
~~Stand Up: Muslim-American Comics Come of Age~~	1/60	Current Affairs; General Documentaries	2007				
Start Up	156/30	Business; IFE	2013-24	HD		^{NETA}	
Start Up: Food and Beverage	29/30	Lifestyle	2013-24	HD		^{NETA}	
Stories of Survival	2/30	History; War Up Close	2019	HD		^{APT}	
~~The Story of Golf~~	1/120 and 2/60	General Documentaries; Sports	1998			^{APT}	
~~The Story of Robert~~	1/30	General Documentaries	revised 1991				
The Story of... Food	9/60	History	2016	HD			
~~Stranger than Fiction: The Saga of Rajneeshpuram~~	1/60	General Documentaries; History	2013	HD			
The Summer Help	1/66	General Documentaries	2016	HD			
Surrender on the USS Missouri	1/60	History; Military	2019	HD		^{APT}	
~~Surviving September 11th: The Story of One New York Family~~	1/30	N/A	2002			^{APT}	
Survivors of Malmedy: December 1944	1/60	History; Military	2018	HD		^{APT}	
Swimming in Auschwitz	1/60	History; War Up Close	2007	HD		^{APT}	
~~Tales of Masked Men~~	1/60	General Documentaries; Sports	2013	HD	As part of Voces		
TasteMAKERS	38/30	Business; IFE; Lifestyle	2018-23	HD		^{APT}	
~~Teddy Tucker: Adventure is My Life~~	1/60	Biography; General Documentaries; High Definition; History	2004			^{PBS}	
~~Teenage Witness: The Fanya Gottesfeld Heller Story~~	1/60	History	2009	HD		^{APT}	
~~The Ten Tenors: Larger Than Life~~	1/60	Performance	2004		Originally titled The Ten Tenors: Live at the Lyrics	^{APT}	
~~These Streets Belong to Us~~	1/60	Current Affairs; General Documentaries	2011	HD			
~~Thin Ice: The Inside Story of Climate Science~~	1/60	Science Health & Nature	2013	HD		^{APT}	
~~Thirst~~	1/62	General Documentaries; Science Health & Nature	2004		As part of POV	^{PBS}	
~~Through a Dog's Eyes~~	1/60	General Documentaries; Science Health & Nature	2009-10	HD		^{PBS}	
~~Tight on The Spiral~~	1/56	General Documentaries; Sports	2000			^{APT}	
~~Tim Gray's World War II Collection~~	14/60; 2/90	History; Military	2014-23	HD	This program includes Day of Days: June 6, 1944, Journey Home to the USS Arizona, D-Day: Over Normandy, Lifeline: Pearl Harbor's Unknown Hero, Survivors of Malmedy: December 1944, The Portillo Expedition: Mystery on Bougainville Island, D-Day At Pointe-du-Hoc, 1st to Fight: Pacific War Marines, Grandpa's War Story Goes Viral, Surrender on the USS Missouri, Rommel: The Soldier, The Son and Hitler, Jack Taylor: The Enterprise, Her War, Her Story: World War II, Merrill's Marauders: They Volunteered for This, The Tuskegee Airmen: Return to Ramitelli, and The Seabees on Iwo Jima.	^{APT}	
Timeless Patriotism: Guam and WWII	1/60	History	2025	HD		^{APT}	
~~To Be First: The Quest for Yangmolong~~	1/60; 1/90	General Documentaries; Science Health & Nature; Sports	2013-14	HD			
To the Ends of the Earth	5/60	General Documentaries; IFE; Science Health & Nature	2018-24	HD		^{APT}	
~~Tonic Sol-fa Christmas~~	1/60	Performance	2005			^{APT}	
~~Trading Women~~	1/60	General Documentaries	2002			^{APT}	
~~The Transformation Age: How to Survive a Technology Revolution with Robert X. Cringely~~	1/60	Business & Technology; General Documentaries	2008			^{APT}	
Trauma Healers	1/60	Current Affairs; General Documentaries; Science Health & Nature	2021	HD		^{APT}	
~~Travels to the Edge with Art Wolfe~~	26/30	High Definition; Lifestyle; Science Health & Nature	2007-08			^{APT}	
~~Travels with Darley~~	30/30	IFE; Lifestyle	2015-18	HD		^{NETA}	
Treblinka's Last Witness	1/88	History; War Up Close	2012-15	HD		^{APT}	
~~The Trial of Saddam Hussein~~	1/60	Current Affairs; General Documentaries; History	2007-08				
Triumph of the Nerds	3/60	Business; General Documentaries; History; IFE	1996	16:9		^{PBS}	
True North: The Sean Swarner Story	1/60	Biography; General Documentaries; Science Health & Nature	2017	HD		^{APT}	
The Tuskegee Airmen: Return to Ramitelli	1/60	History; Military	2023	HD		^{APT}	
The U-Boat and the Rocket	1/60	History; Military	2023	HD			
~~Ultimate Battles: Alexander the Great~~	1/60	High Definition; History	2004				
~~Ultimate Battles: Battle of the Bulge~~	1/60	General Documentaries; High Definition; History	2005				
~~Ultimate Battles: Waterloo~~	1/60	General Documentaries; High Definition; History	2005				
Ultimate Blitzkrieg: WWII Battle of Crete	3/60	History	2020	HD			
~~The Ultimate Resource~~	1/60	Business & Technology; Current Affairs; General Documentaries	2006			^{APT}	
~~Ultimate Thrill Rides~~	6/60	General Documentaries	2008				
Unsettled History	1/60	History; Military	2022	HD		^{APT}	
~~Unspoiled Planet~~	13/30	Science Health & Nature	2004-05				
Unsung Heroes: The Story of America's Female Patriots	2/60	History; War Up Close	2013	HD	This program was originally going to be distributed by American Public Television (APT) in 2014. However, it was distributed by NETA (aka National Educational Telecommunications Association) for any reasons.	^{NETA}	
Urban Conversion	22/30; 1/60 (special)	Lifestyle; Science Health & Nature	2015-19	HD		^{APT}	
~~Vermeer: Master of Light~~	1/60	Art & Culture	2001			^{APT}	
Versailles '73: American Runway Revolution	1/90	Art & Culture; General Documentaries; History	2012	HD			
Village of Death: Oradour-Sur-Glane 1944	1/60	History	2022	HD		^{APT}	
~~Vintage: The Winemaker's Year~~	1/60	Art & Culture; Business; General Documentaries; Lifestyle; Science Health & Nature	2010	HD		^{APT}	
~~Volcanic Sprint~~	1/60	General Documentaries; Science Health & Nature	N/A				
~~The War that Made America~~	4/60	History	2005	HD		^{PBS}	
~~We are Wizards~~	1/60; 1/80	Art & Culture; General Documentaries	2008				
We Hold These Truths: The Global Quest for Liberty	1/60	Current Affairs; General Documentaries; History	2023	HD		^{APT}	
~~Weekend Explorer~~	63/30	Lifestyle	1998-2011	HD		^{PBS}	
Welcome to My Farm	16/30	IFE; Lifestyle	2021-23	HD		^{APT}	
Wellington v Napoleon: Aftermath of Waterloo	1/60	History	2015	HD			
West of the West: Tales from California's Channel Islands	3/60	History; Science Health & Nature	2013-16	HD		^{APT}	
~~What Every Baby Knows~~	26/30	Lifestyle	1985-97		Aired on Lifetime from 1984 to 1998 and on Fox Family in 1999.		
~~Where Words Prevail~~	1/60	Art & Culture; Biography; General Documentaries	2004			^{APT}	
~~Who's Afraid of Happy Endings?~~	1/60	General Documentaries	2007				
~~Wild Florida~~	30/30	Lifestyle; Science Health & Nature	2006-08			^{APT}	
The Wild Ponies of Chincoteague	1/60	General Documentaries; IFE; Science Health & Nature	2018	HD		^{APT}	
~~Window to the Sea~~	1/60	General Documentaries; Science Health & Nature	N/A	HD		^{PBS}	
~~Wine 101~~	6/30	Lifestyle	1997			^{APT}	
Wine First	14/30	Lifestyle	2019-22	HD		^{APT}	
~~Wine, Food & Friends with Karen MacNeil~~	13/30	Lifestyle	2004			^{APT}	
~~Witness to Hope~~	1/120; 2/60	Biography; General Documentaries; History	2002			^{APT}	
~~Wolves in Paradise~~	1/60	General Documentaries; Science Health & Nature	N/A	HD		^{PBS}	
Women Outward Bound	1/60	History	2017	HD		^{APT}	
World Peace and Other 4th Grade Achievements	1/60	General Documentaries	2006-09	HD		^{APT}	
The World War II Foundation Collection	38/60; 3/90	History	2006-25	HD	This program includes D-Day: The Price of Freedom, Navy Heroes of Normandy, World War II: Saving the Reality, Dick Winters: Hang Tough, A Company of Heroes, Maggie's War, A Promise to My Father, Eagles of Mercy, War Journal: The Incredible World War II Escape of Major Damon "Rocky" Gause, Day of Days: June 6, 1944, Omaha Beach: Honor and Sacrifice, Above and Beyond, Doolittle's Raiders: A Final Toast, The American St. Nick, Uncle Jack: The Manhattan Project and Beyond, Remember Pearl Harbor, Journey Home to the USS Arizona, D-Day: Over Normandy, Lifeline: Pearl Harbor's Unknown Hero, Survivors of Malmedy: December 1944, The Portillo Expedition: Mystery on Bougainville Island, D-Day At Pointe-du-Hoc, 1st to Fight: Pacific War Marines, Grandpa's War Story Goes Viral, Surrender on the USS Missouri, Rommel: The Soldier, The Son and Hitler, Elvis and the USS Arizona, Jack Taylor: The Enterprise, Her War, Her Story: World War II, Merrill's Marauders: They Volunteered for This, The Tuskegee Airmen: Return to Ramitelli, The Seabees on Iwo Jima, Bob Dole, Italy and World War II, A Final Landing on Iwo Jima, Village of Death: Oradour-Sur-Glane 1944, Dad's Secret War: France 1944, Peleliu: WWII's Most Well-Preserved Battlefield, Bob Hope and World War II, Timeless Patriotism: Guam and WWII, Breaking Enigma: A World War II Game Changer, and Corpsman! Pearl Harbor.	^{APT}	
~~The World's Greatest Fair~~	1/118; 2/58	Art & Culture; General Documentaries; High Definition; History	2004			^{APT}	
Yoga in Practice	52/30	Lifestyle	2018-23	HD		^{APT}	

== See also ==
- List of programs broadcast by PBS
- List of programs broadcast by PBS Kids
- List of programs broadcast by Create
