= Bag It =

Bag It may refer to:

- Bag It: Is Your Life Too Plastic?, a 2010 documentary film
- "Bag It", a song by Canadian musician Peaches on her album Fatherfucker
