= Why Am I? =

- Genre: Documentary
- Directed by: Paul Casserly; Mark McNeill; Irena Dol
- Narrated by: Susie Ferguson
- Country of origin: New Zealand
- No. of episodes: 4

Production
- Producer: Mark McNeill
- Editor: Irena Dol
- Production company: Razor Films

Original release
- Network: Television New Zealand
- Release: 31 May – 21 June 2016

Why Am I?: The Science of Us (also known as Predict My Future: The Science of Us) is a 2016 New Zealand documentary series about the Dunedin Multidisciplinary Health and Development Study (also known as 'The Dunedin Study'), a long-running cohort study following 1037 people born in Dunedin, New Zealand during 1972 and 1973. The study revealed the result of the combined effects of hereditary (genes) and environment (upbringing) on how people turn out.

The series of four sixty minute episodes was made by Razor Films of Auckland, New Zealand, and screened on TV One from 31 May to 21 June 2016, with all four episodes available online on TVNZ On Demand.

The series follows the study and information it has provided in almost every field of medical and social development including respiratory and cardiovascular health, addictions, obesity, sexual health, cognitive neuroscience, psychiatry, genetics and criminology and the effects of nature and nurture on health and behaviour.

== Episodes ==
No.	Title	Original release date
1	"The Early Years"	31 May 2016
2	"When Teens Go Off the Rails"	7 June 2016
3	"When Genes Mix with the Wrong Environment"	14 June 2016
4	"Dirt is Good, Dirt Poor is Bad"	21 June 2016
