= Farmers' Almanac TV =

Farmers' Almanac TV is a television show that was originally broadcast throughout the USA on public television, based on the periodical of the same name. The magazine-style show covers interesting personalities, unique events and admirable endeavors from both the familiar and remote corners of the North American landscape. Peppered throughout are hints and tips that span a dozen varied lifestyle categories—gardening, cooking, natural cures, weather and others—taken straight from years of actual Almanac pages. The show is hosted by Jim Wann, the Tony-nominated writer of the musical Pump Boys and Dinettes.

The studio Farmers' Almanac TV filed for Chapter 7 bankruptcy in May 2009. The filing was in Chatham County, Georgia, with documents revealing that the company made no revenue in any of its years of operation. Over 50 investors have been cut out of any profits as the judge allowed the dissolving company's officers to value the assets at under $150,000, which would go to Turner Investments, an insider who loaned the company money one year earlier.

== Background ==
The Farmers' Almanac TV studio had the exclusive license to use the Farmers' Almanac trademarks and copyrights for video and electronic media production. Founded in 2003 by Savannah, GA-based Buy The Farm, LLC, the studio produced Farmers' Almanac TV. The flagship series debuted on public television in 2006, and once aired in almost 90% of the nation. The weekly 30-minute magazine-format series covered fascinating personalities, unique events and admirable endeavors from both the familiar and remote corners of the North American landscape. Peppered throughout are hints and tips that span a dozen varied lifestyle categories—gardening, cooking, natural cures, weather and others—taken straight from years of actual Almanac pages.

There are plans for Farmers' Almanac TV to relaunch on RFD, according to Ogden Media which sells advertising for Farmers' Almanac and its TV offering.
