= The Artist Toolbox =

PBS interview program

The Artist Toolbox is an interview program on PBS, hosted by Emmy Award winning writer/director John Jacobsen. The program focuses on the creative process of a selection of master-level artists in disciplines such as music, architecture, comedy, fashion, acting, ballet, writing, design, etc. The Artist Toolbox premiered nationwide in the United States on January 7, 2011 and subsequently played on Alaska Airlines and in many international countries. The first season includes guests violinist David Garrett, writer Isabel Allende, musician John Legend, designers Ruben and Isabel Toledo, actor Tom Skerritt, fashion designer Zang Toi, abstract artist Sam Gilliam, graphic design team Massimo Vignelli and his wife Lella, architect Hugh Newell Jacobsen, American Ballet Theatre principles Irina Dvorovenko and Maxim Beloserkovsky, chef Daniel Boulud, musician Ramsey Lewis and comedic actor Jason Alexander. Subsequent seasons aired shows on the architect Tom Kundig, and standards jazz singer Steve Tyrell. Host John Jacobsen is also a founder and faculty member of the Seattle screenwriting and directing program TheFilmSchool and is co-founder of MogaJacobsen Productions.
