= List of programs formerly distributed by American Public Television =

The following is a list of lists of programs formerly distributed to public television stations (including PBS affiliates) through American Public Television. There is a separate list for current, upcoming and unreleased programming.

== See also ==
- List of programs broadcast by PBS
- List of programs broadcast by PBS Kids
- List of programs broadcast by Create
