= List of documentary specials formerly distributed by American Public Television =

The following is a list of documentary specials formerly distributed to public television stations (including PBS affiliates) through American Public Television. There is a separate list for current, upcoming and unreleased programming.

Legend
^{APT WORLDWIDE}	Also on APT Worldwide
^{CREATE}	Also on Create
^{HDTV}	High-definition television
^{ITVS}	Funded and distributed by Independent Television Service
^{LPB}	Funded and distributed by Latino Public Broadcasting
^{NHK}	Funded and distributed by NHK (Japan Broadcasting Corporation)
^{VMM}	Funded and distributed by Vision Maker Media (formerly Native American Public Broadcasting Consortium and Native American Public Telecommunications)
^{WORLD}	Also on WORLD

== 1980s ==
Title	Premiere date	End date	Note(s)	Legend(s)	Source(s)
Xi'an	June 1, 1980	May 31, 1982			
The Making of Gandhi: Mr. Attenborough and Mr. Gandhi	February 1, 1983	March 31, 1983			
Titanic: A Question of Murder	January 1, 1984	April 30, 1987	(Note: Distributed by PBS in 1983.)		
Death by Misadventure: The Sinking of the Lusitania	January 1, 1984	July 31, 1986			
The Eleanor Roosevelt Story	October 1, 1984	September 30, 1985			
Monsters, Madmen and Machines	August 18, 1985	August 17, 1989	(Note: Also known as Monsters, Madmen & Machines: 80 Years of Science Fiction.)		
Drive-in Blues	October 1, 1987	September 30, 1989			

== 1990s ==
Title	Premiere date	End date	Note(s)	Legend(s)	Source(s)
USS Nautilus	September 1, 1991	August 31, 1994			
The Making of a Legend: Gone with the Wind	March 1, 1992	December 31, 1994			
You Don't Have to Die	June 30, 1992	June 29, 1994			
Within These Walls: A Visit to the White House	October 4, 1992	October 3, 1996			
Within These Walls: A Visit to the White House	June 30, 1997	June 29, 2003			
When the Fire Whistle Blows	October 14, 1992	October 13, 1996			
The Wonderful Wizard of Oz: The Making of a Movie Classic	June 1, 1993	August 31, 1996			
Titanic	March 1, 1994	April 30, 2000			
Surviving the Odds: To Be a Young Black Male in America	April 19, 1994	April 18, 1996			
Apollo 13: To the Edge and Back	July 20, 1994	July 19, 1997			
Missions to the Moon	July 20, 1994	July 19, 1997			
Passin' It On	August 1, 1994	July 31, 1997	(Note: As part of POV.)	^{ITVS}	
Names... From Home	October 1, 1994	October 31, 1996			
Kansai: Japan's Ancient Capital Emerges Again	October 2, 1994	April 30, 1996			
Coming Out: It Takes a Lifetime	October 9, 1994	October 8, 1997			
Mommy, Who'll Take Care of Me?	January 31, 1995	January 30, 1998			
You Don't Have to Ride Jim Crow!	February 19, 1995	February 18, 1998			
You Can't Do That! The Making of "A Hard Day's Night"	March 1, 1995	March 31, 1996			
The Last Minority	March 4, 1995	March 3, 1997			
Route 66: The Road That Built America	June 1, 1995	June 30, 1997			
Cedar Point Memories	June 3, 1995	August 31, 2001			
Homophobia in the Workplace	June 7, 1995	August 31, 1999			
They Served with Honor	August 14, 1995	August 13, 1998			
Curves, Contours & Body Horns	September 1, 1995	August 31, 1997			
Streetcar Stories	September 23, 1995	September 22, 2002			
The Germans: Portrait of a New Nation	September 29, 1995	September 28, 1998			
Doctor Zhivago: The Making of a Russian Epic	November 1, 1995	March 31, 1997			
Honor Bound: A Personal Journey	November 4, 1995	May 31, 2000			
Camp Forgotten	December 1, 1995	November 30, 1998			
Rocky Mountain Legacy: Elitch Gardens	March 2, 1996	August 31, 1999			
Cape May: Victorians by the Sea	March 15, 1996	April 14, 1998			
The Journey of the Butterfly	April 1, 1996	March 31, 2000			
The Journey of the Butterfly	April 1, 2003	March 31, 2007			
For Women's Lives: Dialogues on Breast Cancer	April 2, 1996	April 1, 1999			
ER: Life on the Edge	April 7, 1996	April 6, 1999			
Moonwalkers: The Men of Apollo	May 1, 1996	April 30, 1998			
Moonwalkers: The Men of Apollo	June 30, 1999	June 29, 2001			
The History of the Harley Davidson Motorcycle	May 1, 1996	April 30, 1998			
Left to Die: The Tragedy of the USS Juneau	May 5, 1996	May 4, 2000			
Inner Journeys, Public Stands	June 1, 1996	May 31, 1998			
Gift of the Gods	June 30, 1996	June 29, 1998			
The Lemon Grove Incident	August 1, 1996	July 31, 1998			
Are You Black, White or What?	September 9, 1996	September 8, 1999			
Gargoyles: Guardians of the Gate	October 1, 1996	September 30, 1999			
Vampires of New England	October 15, 1996	October 31, 1999			
Deadly Fuze: The Story of WWII's Best Kept Secret	November 1, 1996	October 31, 2008	(Note: Originally aviation/military genre.)		
A Fair to Remember	November 21, 1996	December 31, 1998			
Gospel According to Jesus	November 24, 1996	December 31, 1999			
Heart Disease: A Woman's Story	December 1, 1996	November 30, 1998			
Positive Voices	December 1, 1996	November 30, 1998			
Apollo 12: Uncensored	February 1, 1997	January 31, 1999			
The Making of Lord of the Dance	March 1, 1997	February 1, 2000			
Fading in the Mist	April 1, 1997	March 31, 2003			
Children with a Dream	April 2, 1997	April 1, 2000			
Upon These Grounds: Exploring the White House Garden	April 9, 1997	April 8, 2004			
Harlan County, USA	August 1, 1997	July 31, 1999			
Bandstand Days	August 5, 1997	August 4, 1999			
Saga of the Steamship Atlantic	September 1, 1997	August 31, 2006			
The Bean File	September 1, 1997	August 31, 1999			
100 Years of Horror	October 31, 1997	October 31, 1999			
China Now	November 1, 1997	October 31, 1999			
Steamin' Demon: A Rebirth	December 1, 1997	November 30, 2000			
Face: A Portrait	December 1, 1997	November 30, 2000			
Tread: The Movie	December 1, 1997	December 31, 1998			
Concert of Wills: Making the Getty Center	December 17, 1997	February 28, 2001			
Hersheypark: Sweet Memories	December 23, 1997	December 22, 2011			
Apollo 16: The Men, Moon, and Memories	January 1, 1998	December 31, 1999			
Remembering Bonnie & Clyde	February 1, 1998	January 31, 2000			
Seize the Day	April 1, 1998	March 31, 2001		^{APT WORLDWIDE}	
Mumia Abu-Jamal: A Case For Reasonable Doubt?	July 1, 1998	June 30, 2000			
The Amish and Us	July 31, 1998	July 30, 2010		^{ITVS}	
The Best Is Yet to Be: The Art of Aging in America	August 1, 1998	July 31, 2004			
Diana, Princess of Wales: The Shrine	August 1, 1998	July 31, 2000			
Making a Killing: A Legacy Stolen by the Nazis	August 1, 1998	July 31, 2000			
¿Adios Patria? The Cuban Exodus	August 1, 1998	February 28, 2001			
A Song for Sisters	September 1, 1998	August 31, 2007			
Final Target: Planet Earth	September 1, 1998	August 31, 2000			
We Made It Through the Rain	September 3, 1998	September 2, 2000			
Depression: Beating the Blues	September 6, 1998	September 5, 2006			
Surviving Ovarian Cancer	September 6, 1998	September 5, 2001			
Courageous Portraits, Living with Cancer	September 20, 1998	September 19, 2004	(Note: This contract originally was scheduled to expire on September 19, 2000 and has been extended with a revised end date of September 19, 2003. Broadcast rights during extended period are an additional "4 releases including non-commercial cable and school re-record rights".)		
Chiapas	October 1, 1998	October 31, 2000			
Photographer Flip Schulke	October 2, 1998	November 1, 2000			
The Wall That Heals	November 1, 1998	October 31, 2001			
The Healers of 400 Parnassus	November 1, 1998	October 31, 2000			
Sixty Seconds That Will Shake the World	December 1, 1998	November 30, 2000			
Divine Food	December 1, 1998	November 30, 2000			
Everest: Mountain of Dreams, Mountain of Doom - Tempting Fate	December 1, 1998	November 30, 2000			
The Making of Feet of Flames	December 1, 1998	January 1, 2001			
The Abbey Road Story	January 1, 1999	December 31, 2000			
Land for Learning: Justin Morrill and America's Land Grant Colleges & Universities	January 3, 1999	January 2, 2001			
Remember the Maine	January 8, 1999	January 7, 2005			
Escape from Antarctica: On the Trail of Shackleton	February 1, 1999	January 31, 2001			
The Bells of Chernobyl: 10 Years After	February 1, 1999	January 31, 2001			
Black as Ink	February 1, 1999	January 31, 2001			
Hollywood Animal Stars	February 1, 1999	January 31, 2001			
Cut in Antwerp	February 1, 1999	April 1, 2001			
A Sculpture of Love and Anguish: The Miami Holocaust Memorial	February 14, 1999	April 30, 2003	(Note: This contract was originally scheduled to expire on February 13, 2002 and has been extended.)		
The Story of Golf	March 1, 1999	February 28, 2011		^{APT WORLDWIDE}	
Bob Hope: Memories of World War II	March 1, 1999	March 31, 2002			
Michael and Robert	April 1, 1999	March 31, 2001			
In Search of the Amber Room	April 1, 1999	March 31, 2001			
Franco's Jews	April 1, 1999	April 1, 2001			
Searching for the Great Hopewell Road	April 16, 1999	April 15, 2005			
The Frontier Photographers	April 18, 1999	April 17, 2008			
Atomic Filmmakers: Behind the Scenes	April 18, 1999	April 17, 2001			
In the Bag	April 25, 1999	April 24, 2002			
Out of the Darkness: Women and Depression	May 9, 1999	May 8, 2005			
Osteoporosis: Breaking the Fall	May 9, 1999	May 8, 2005	(Note: Originally nature & science genre.)		
When a Child Pretends	May 14, 1999	May 13, 2012			
Wiley Post of Oklahoma	May 15, 1999	May 14, 2016			
A Story of Healing	June 1, 1999	May 31, 2008			
One World: Finland in the International Marketplace	June 1, 1999	May 31, 2002		^{APT WORLDWIDE}	
Voices	June 1, 1999	May 31, 2001			
Rockin' Warriors	June 6, 1999	June 5, 2001			
Smokescreen	June 13, 1999	November 30, 2002			
Dreams on Fire	June 27, 1999	June 26, 2002		^{ITVS}	
Antiques Roadshow Unwrapped	June 30, 1999	June 29, 2001			
The Face	June 30, 1999	June 29, 2001			
Apollo 11: First Steps on the Moon	June 30, 1999	June 29, 2001			
Apollo 11: First Steps on the Moon	March 1, 2009	February 28, 2011			
Child Safety: It's No Accident	July 18, 1999	July 17, 2011			
Café con Leche	August 1, 1999	July 31, 2002			
Nation Within	August 8, 1999	August 7, 2004			
Come Back Jack	August 22, 1999	August 21, 2002			
Bye-Bye Babushka	August 31, 1999	December 31, 2001		^{APT WORLDWIDE}	
Lost Treasures of Christianity: The Ancient Monuments of Armenia	September 5, 1999	September 4, 2008	(Note: Originally art genre.)	^{APT WORLDWIDE}	
Climb Against the Odds	September 12, 1999	September 11, 2002			
From the Far East to the Old West: Chinese & Japanese Settlers in Montana	September 12, 1999	September 11, 2007			
Lyme Disease: A Guide to Prevention	September 26, 1999	September 25, 2005			
Schemitzun: A Celebration of Native American Song and Dance	October 3, 1999	October 2, 2005			
The Visionaries Special Report — Heroes of Hope: The Crisis in Kosovo	October 24, 1999	October 23, 2001			
Yes, In My Backyard	November 1, 1999	October 31, 2002		^{ITVS}	
Cat People	November 1, 1999	October 31, 2001			
Qigong: Ancient Chinese Healing for the 21st Century	November 1, 1999	October 31, 2001			
Add It Up	November 7, 1999	November 6, 2002			
No Missing Link with Dr. Ruth Westheimer	November 14, 1999	November 13, 2007			
After Lockerbie	December 1, 1999	November 30, 2001			
How to Beat the Clock	December 1, 1999	November 30, 2001			
Drancy	December 1, 1999	November 30, 2001			
A Race of Survival	December 1, 1999	November 30, 2001			
Road Predators	December 15, 1999	December 14, 2002			

== 2000s ==
Title	Premiere date	End date	Note(s)	Legend(s)	Source(s)
Remembering Anne Frank	January 1, 2000	December 31, 2001			
Indian Motorcycle Memories	February 15, 2000	February 14, 2018			
New York the Way It Was “Greenwich Village”	February 19, 2000	February 18, 2006			
Uncommon Friends of the 20th Century	March 1, 2000	February 28, 2002			
Exploring Your Brain III: The Brain-Body Connection	March 31, 2000	March 30, 2007			
The Final Hours: Amelia Earhart's Last Flight	March 31, 2000	March 30, 2015			
Silent Witnesses: America's Historic Trees	April 1, 2000	March 31, 2006			
Caregivers: The Heart of Home Care	April 1, 2000	September 30, 2004			
Fabulous Trolleys: The History of Trolleys in America	April 1, 2000	March 31, 2002			
The Cosmonaut Cover-Up	April 1, 2000	March 31, 2002			
Tak for Alt: Survival of a Human Spirit	April 1, 2000	March 31, 2002			
Fat Chance	April 1, 2000	March 31, 2002			
Leif Eriksson: The Man Who Almost Changed the World	April 1, 2000	May 31, 2003		^{HDTV}	
A Century of London	May 1, 2000	April 30, 2002			
The Launching of the Kalmar Nyckel	June 2, 2000	June 1, 2006			
Homeless in My Hometown	June 4, 2000	June 3, 2006			
When Ends Don't Meet	June 11, 2000	June 10, 2006			
Atomic Journeys*	July 15, 2000	July 14, 2002	(Note: Also known as Atomic Journeys: Welcome to Ground Zero.)		
Mosquitoes and the West Nile Virus	August 1, 2000	July 31, 2001			
Mosquitoes and the West Nile Virus	September 20, 2002	September 19, 2004			
Final Choice: America Struggles with the Right to Die	August 6, 2000	August 5, 2003			
A Damned Dirty Business: The Story of the Lusitania	August 31, 2000	August 30, 2002			
Death: A Love Story	September 1, 2000	August 31, 2002			
Nukes in Space	September 1, 2000	August 31, 2002			
Maverick's: A Documentary Film	September 1, 2000	August 31, 2002		^{APT WORLDWIDE}	
Slapstick	September 1, 2000	August 31, 2002			
Glidepath to Recovery	September 3, 2000	September 2, 2012			
Tight on the Spiral	September 6, 2000	September 5, 2007		^{APT WORLDWIDE}	
Asleep at the Wheel: The Making of Ride with Bob	September 8, 2000	September 7, 2006	(Note: Originally music & entertainment genre.)		
Pulse	September 8, 2000	July 7, 2005			
Ida Tarbell: All in the Day's Work	September 14, 2000	September 13, 2006			
Renee's Story	October 1, 2000	September 30, 2009			
Blazes of Light: Women Living with HIV/AIDS	October 1, 2000	September 30, 2004			
Rocking the Barriers: Women Working 2000 and Beyond	October 1, 2000	October 2, 2004			
The Coke Bottle Story: The Bottle, the Collection, the Family	October 6, 2000	October 5, 2010			
American Byzantine	November 1, 2000	October 31, 2002			
Pius XII: The Pope, the Jews and the Nazis	November 1, 2000	October 31, 2002	(Note: Originally titled The Pope and the Nazis: Silence of the Shepherd.)		
Lives Together, Worlds Apart	November 5, 2000	November 4, 2004		^{APT WORLDWIDE}	
Summer, Autumn, War, Spring	December 1, 2000	November 30, 2002			
The McCourts of Limerick	January 1, 2001	December 31, 2002			
Pain & Parking in Los Angeles	January 2, 2001	January 1, 2003	(Note: Originally culture & lifestyle genre.)		
Out of the Fire: The Art & Science of Ceramics	January 19, 2001	January 18, 2013			
Enduring Faith	February 1, 2001	January 31, 2010			
Is God a Number?	March 1, 2001	February 28, 2003			
New England and the Civil War	April 1, 2001	March 31, 2007			
Africa's Children	April 1, 2001	March 31, 2016		^{APT WORLDWIDE}	
Liberation of the Spirit: The Journey of Magda Watts	April 1, 2001	March 31, 2005			
Time Flies	April 1, 2001	March 31, 2003			
Surfing for Life	April 14, 2001	April 13, 2003			
The Old Spaghetti Factory	April 15, 2001	April 14, 2010			
William Henry Seward: Lincoln's Right Hand	April 22, 2001	April 21, 2007			
One World: Japan	May 1, 2001	April 30, 2004		^{APT WORLDWIDE}^{HDTV}	
Forsaken Fields	May 6, 2001	August 4, 2017			
Brick City Lessons	May 13, 2001	May 12, 2007			
No Place to Be Smart	May 13, 2001	May 12, 2007			
How to Spend an Hour	June 3, 2001	June 2, 2013			
Gladiators: Bloodsport of the Colosseum	June 30, 2001	June 29, 2003			
The Turtle Hunter	June 30, 2001	June 29, 2003			
The New Klezmorim	August 1, 2001	July 31, 2004	(Note: Also known as The New Klezmorim: Voices Inside the Revival of Yiddish Music.)		
Sleeping with the Enemy	August 1, 2001	July 31, 2003			
Janos Starker: A 75th Birthday Celebration	September 9, 2001	September 8, 2005			
The Flight of Pedro Pan	September 16, 2001	October 15, 2008			
Our Food, Our Future	September 16, 2001	September 15, 2009			
Superbugs: The Killer Viruses	September 30, 2001	September 29, 2005			
Aeroplane Dance	October 1, 2001	December 31, 2003			
Beyond the Moon	October 14, 2001	October 13, 2004			
Four Hands, One Heart: Ed and Mary Scheier	October 14, 2001	February 13, 2015			
2001 and Beyond	November 1, 2001	October 31, 2003			
Vermeer: Master of Light	November 11, 2001	November 10, 2005		^{APT WORLDWIDE}	
Where the Earth Meets the Sky: The Glassworks of Josh Simpson	November 11, 2001	November 10, 2011			
Discovering the Real World of Harry Potter	November 20, 2001	December 19, 2004			
Spirit Quest	November 25, 2001	November 24, 2005	(Note: Pledge version.)		
Angels	December 1, 2001	December 31, 2003	(Note: 1994 version.)		
Keep on Walking	February 1, 2002	January 31, 2004			
Whispers of Angels: A Story of the Underground Railroad	February 3, 2002	February 2, 2017	(Note: Originally titled Whispers of Angels (as a full series).)		
HAPA: One Step at a Time	February 3, 2002	February 2, 2014			
Witness to Hope	February 3, 2002	February 2, 2011		^{APT WORLDWIDE}	
The Road to Reconciliation	February 8, 2002	February 7, 2005		^{APT WORLDWIDE}	
El Salvador: Crisis and Challenge	February 15, 2002	February 14, 2010			
A Race for the Soul	February 22, 2002	February 21, 2008			
Horowitz: A Reminiscence	February 24, 2002	February 23, 2006			
Under the Covers	March 1, 2002	February 28, 2004			
Changing Nature: Population and Environment At a Crossroads	March 17, 2002	March 16, 2005		^{APT WORLDWIDE}	
The Fifth Gospel: The Land and Sea of Galilee	March 17, 2002	March 16, 2011			
Come Back Jack 2002	March 22, 2002	March 21, 2006			
Reclaiming Hope...In a Changed World	March 29, 2002	March 28, 2006			
Child Protective Services	April 12, 2002	April 11, 2006			
Minds Behind the Station	April 14, 2002	April 13, 2014			
South of Brooklyn	April 14, 2002	April 13, 2005			
The Journey Home: Stories From Hospice	April 19, 2002	April 18, 2018			
The Flying Days of Riddle Field	May 1, 2002	May 31, 2005			
Okie Noodling	May 5, 2002	May 4, 2006		^{ITVS}	
Okie Noodling	April 1, 2007	March 31, 2015		^{ITVS}	
Elizabeth Winthrop: All the Days of Her Life	May 5, 2002	May 4, 2014			
When the Forest Ran Red	May 10, 2002	May 9, 2006			
Homecoming: A Vietnam Vet's Journey	May 24, 2002	May 23, 2005			
The Ocean's Eleven Story	June 30, 2002	June 29, 2004			
Three Presidents, East of the Blue Ridge	July 1, 2002	June 30, 2010			
Palestine	August 1, 2002	July 31, 2004			
Walking at the Edge: A Journey into Dying and Living	August 30, 2002	August 29, 2007			
Surviving September 11th: The Story of One New York Family	September 1, 2002	December 12, 2007		^{APT WORLDWIDE}	
Make It Happen: Mentors, Dreams, Success	September 1, 2002	August 31, 2008			
Twin Towers: A History	September 1, 2002	September 30, 2004			
A Woman's Heart	September 6, 2002	September 5, 2006			
N Is a Number: A Portrait of Paul Erdös	September 15, 2002	October 14, 2011			
Isabella d'Este: First Lady of the Renaissance	September 15, 2002	September 14, 2014			
Killing Time	October 1, 2002	September 30, 2004			
Out of the Fire	October 1, 2002	September 30, 2004			
Crossing Time: The Wheeling Suspension Bridge	October 4, 2002	October 3, 2006			
The Call of Story: An American Renaissance	October 6, 2002	October 5, 2018			
Sylvia's Path	October 9, 2002	April 30, 2006			
Rock Jocks: The FM Revolution	November 1, 2002	October 31, 2004			
Lindbergh's Great Race	November 1, 2002	October 31, 2004			
Lost in Everest's Death Zone	November 1, 2002	October 31, 2004			
Cael Sanderson: Portrait of the Champion	November 3, 2002	November 2, 2006			
Trailer Park Blues	November 8, 2002	November 7, 2014		^{ITVS}	
Frankl's Choice	November 8, 2002	November 7, 2010			
Under Another Sun: Japanese in Singapore	November 11, 2002	November 10, 2014			
The Mystery of the Three Kings	November 15, 2002	December 31, 2005			
The Mystery of the Three Kings	December 1, 2007	December 31, 2009			
Prange & Pearl Harbor: A Magnificent Obsession	November 22, 2002	November 21, 2018			
Show Girls	December 1, 2002	July 31, 2003			
Gridiron & Steel	December 15, 2002	December 14, 2005			
Umbrellas	January 1, 2003	December 31, 2004			
We Shall Not Be Moved	February 1, 2003	February 28, 2005			
Playing for Real	February 2, 2003	February 1, 2007		^{APT WORLDWIDE}	
Seizing Power: The Steel Seizure Case Revisited	February 13, 2003	February 12, 2007			
Mobile America	February 20, 2003	February 19, 2006			
Quiltfest: For the Love of Fabric	February 21, 2003	February 20, 2007			
Sacred Stone: Temple on the Mississippi	February 22, 2003	February 21, 2006			
Hispanic Hollywood	March 1, 2003	February 28, 2006			
Hope on the Street	April 1, 2003	March 31, 2006			
Proud to Be a Girl	April 1, 2003	March 31, 2007			
The Journey of the Butterfly: The Legacy	April 1, 2003	March 31, 2007		^{APT WORLDWIDE}	
Antiques Roadshow: 25 Years	April 1, 2003	March 31, 2005			
Mengele: The Final Account	April 1, 2003	March 31, 2005			
See How They Run	April 1, 2003	March 31, 2005			
The Math Life	April 6, 2003	April 5, 2007			
Electrum: Science as Art	April 6, 2003	April 5, 2007		^{APT WORLDWIDE}	
The Rural Studio	April 6, 2003	April 5, 2007		^{ITVS}	
The Roots of California Photography: The Monterey Legacy	April 6, 2003	April 5, 2007			
Trading Women	April 11, 2003	April 10, 2011		^{APT WORLDWIDE}	
Bittersweet Roots: The Chinese in California's Heartland	April 13, 2003	April 12, 2015			
Paniolo Ó Hawai'i: Cowboys of the Far West	April 13, 2003	April 12, 2007			
Poetic Dream Space	April 13, 2003	September 30, 2005			
China 21	May 1, 2003	April 30, 2007		^{APT WORLDWIDE}^{ITVS}	
Desi: South Asians in New York	May 1, 2003	April 30, 2007			
Life Could Be a Dream: The Doo Wop Sound	May 1, 2003	April 30, 2005			
Patsy Cline: The Lady Behind the Legend	May 4, 2003	May 3, 2007			
Mount Kailash: Return to Tibet	May 4, 2003	May 3, 2007			
Different by Design: Columbus, Indiana	May 11, 2003	May 10, 2007			
Message in the Bubble	May 11, 2003	July 31, 2006			
The Last Reunion: A Gathering of Heroes	May 16, 2003	May 15, 2004			
Prince William the Reluctant Royal	June 16, 2003	June 15, 2005			
The Short Life of Anne Frank	June 30, 2003	June 29, 2006			
Choices Over a Lifetime	July 1, 2003	June 30, 2007			
Seizing Power: The Steel Seizure Case Revisited	July 6, 2003	July 5, 2007			
Main Street America	July 6, 2003	July 5, 2009			
Safe Harbor	July 6, 2003	July 5, 2018			
José Martí: Legacy of Freedom	August 1, 2003	July 31, 2006			
Tempting Faith	August 29, 2003	August 28, 2005			
Growing Up Hispanic	August 31, 2003	July 31, 2005			
Peter Drucker: An Intellectual Journey	September 5, 2003	September 4, 2007		^{APT WORLDWIDE}	
From Pictures to Words	September 5, 2003	September 4, 2010			
9/11: Clear the Skies	September 5, 2003	September 30, 2005			
Beyond Borders: John Sayles in Mexico	September 18, 2003	August 31, 2005			
Creative Hearts	October 1, 2003	September 30, 2017			
Who Killed the Federal Theatre?	October 3, 2003	October 2, 2007			
Forever Friends	October 5, 2003	October 4, 2011			
30 Years of "Last of the Summer Wine"	November 1, 2003	October 31, 2005			
30 Years of "Last of the Summer Wine"	November 1, 2006	October 31, 2008			
Classic Love Matches	November 1, 2003	October 31, 2005			
Secrets of the Royal Kitchen	November 1, 2003	October 31, 2005			
Five Miles High	November 1, 2003	October 31, 2005	(Note: Nature & science genre in the 1st release.)		
Five Miles High	June 30, 2006	June 29, 2008	(Note: Nature & science genre in the 1st release.)		
Berlin Metamorphoses	November 2, 2003	November 1, 2007			
Johnstown Flood	November 7, 2003	November 6, 2011			
Mothers in Prison. Children in Crisis.	November 14, 2003	November 13, 2007			
Eye of the Beholder: The Artistry of James Hubbell	November 15, 2003	November 14, 2011		^{APT WORLDWIDE}	
JFK: Breaking the News	November 16, 2003	December 16, 2006		^{HDTV}	
JFK: Breaking the News	June 30, 2007	December 31, 2009		^{HDTV}	
JFK: Breaking the News	October 1, 2013	September 30, 2015		^{HDTV}	
JFK: Breaking the News	November 1, 2023	October 31, 2025		^{HDTV}	
Quilt City USA: For the Love of Fabric	November 16, 2003	November 15, 2013			
The Joel Files	December 1, 2003	November 30, 2005			
Imagining Robert: My Brothers, Madness and Survival	January 2, 2004	January 1, 2016			
Out of the Ashes: Recovering the Lost Library of Herculaneum	January 4, 2004	January 3, 2008		^{APT WORLDWIDE}^{HDTV}	
What Color is the News?: The Coverage of Race in America	February 1, 2004	January 31, 2016	(Note: Originally News & public affairs genre.)		
The Hines Farm Blues Club	February 1, 2004	January 31, 2020			
One Shot: The Life and Work of Teenie Harris	February 1, 2004	January 31, 2008			
Phenomenal Voyage: Women Engineering the Future	February 1, 2004	January 31, 2008			
May the Road Rise to Meet You	February 22, 2004	February 21, 2007			
A Laugh, a Tear, a Mitzvah	February 22, 2004	February 21, 2007			
Another Mitzvah	February 22, 2004	February 21, 2007			
Herb Cohen: Negotiating, Care, But Not That Much!	February 23, 2004	February 22, 2007			
The Illuminated Bible	March 1, 2004	March 31, 2007			
A Survivor's Journey	March 28, 2004	March 27, 2006			
Hidden Heroes	March 28, 2004	March 27, 2010			
D-Day: The Shortest Day	April 1, 2004	April 30, 2006			
The Boys of Buchenwald	April 1, 2004	April 30, 2006			
The Queer Case of the Irish Crown Jewels	April 1, 2004	March 31, 2006			
The Race for Open Space	April 4, 2004	April 3, 2012			
Fiji Firewalkers	April 4, 2004	April 3, 2012			
Buffalo's Houses of Worship	April 4, 2004	April 3, 2008		^{HDTV}	
Long Journey Home	April 4, 2004	April 3, 2008			
American Roots Special: A Portrait of Marc and Ann Savoy	April 4, 2004	April 3, 2016			
The Greening of Eritrea: Seawater Brings Hope to Africa's Coast	April 4, 2004	April 3, 2016			
Addiction in the Workplace: The Price We All Pay	April 9, 2004	April 8, 2012	(Note: Planned to be news & public affairs genre.)		
Women in the Winner's Circle	April 11, 2004	April 10, 2008			
Students Turn for a Change	April 11, 2004	April 10, 2008			
Splendid Splinters: The Armand Lamontagne Story	April 11, 2004	April 10, 2008			
Passion & Discipline: Don Quixote's Lessons for Leadership	April 11, 2004	April 10, 2012			
The Summer of a Lifetime	April 18, 2004	April 17, 2012			
Return to the Valley	May 1, 2004	April 30, 2007			
A Cloud Over Bhopal	May 1, 2004	April 30, 2006			
Desegregation: A Dream Delayed	May 1, 2004	April 30, 2016			
Thank You, Eddie Hart	May 2, 2004	May 31, 2012	(Note: Planned to end on May 1, 2016.)		
Smokestack Lightning: A Day in the Life of Barbecue	May 2, 2004	May 1, 2010			
Pure Magic: The Mother-Daughter Bond	May 2, 2004	May 1, 2013			
Manhood & Violence: Fatal Peril	May 2, 2004	May 1, 2016		^{APT WORLDWIDE}	
I Can't Marry You	June 1, 2004	May 31, 2007			
One Bite of the Apple: A Portrait of the Artist Edwina Sandys	June 4, 2004	June 3, 2012		^{APT WORLDWIDE}	
Trust Me	June 15, 2004	March 15, 2007			
Queen Victoria: Secrets of a Queen	June 30, 2004	June 29, 2006			
The Royals & Their Pets	June 30, 2004	June 29, 2006			
Tulip: Light of the East	June 30, 2004	June 29, 2006			
Great Scenic Railway Journeys: Australia	June 30, 2004	June 29, 2006			
She-Pope	June 30, 2004	June 29, 2006			
A Pug's Life: The Dog-umentary	June 30, 2004	June 29, 2006			
Through Hell for Hitler	June 30, 2004	June 29, 2006	(Note: A stand-alone special from Timewatch.)		
It's Greece to Me! A Kid's-Eye View	July 1, 2004	June 30, 2007			
From the Ashes: The Life and Times of Tick Hall	July 1, 2004	June 30, 2007			
Gettysburg: The Boys in Blue & Grey	July 1, 2004	June 30, 2008			
Spirit of the Bay: Tuckerton Seaport	July 1, 2004	June 30, 2012			
The Diana Conspiracy	August 1, 2004	July 31, 2006			
Success by 6: A Bright Start for a Bright Future	September 1, 2004	August 31, 2012			
September's Children	September 1, 2004	August 31, 2016		^{APT WORLDWIDE}	
House of Freedom, Tower of Dreams	September 1, 2004	August 31, 2018			
Correction	September 3, 2004	September 2, 2008		^{ITVS}	
The Cure	September 5, 2004	September 4, 2014		^{APT WORLDWIDE}	
An Unlikely Friendship	October 1, 2004	September 30, 2020			
With All Deliberate Speed: The Legacy of Brown V. Board	October 1, 2004	September 30, 2016			
Unless a Death Occurs: Hazing Examined	October 3, 2004	October 2, 2007			
No Compromise: Lessons in Feminist Art with Judy Chicago	October 3, 2004	October 2, 2012			
AIDS at 21	November 1, 2004	December 31, 2006			
Re-Imagining Ireland	November 1, 2004	October 31, 2008			
Wildwood Days	November 1, 2004	October 31, 2006			
King of Stonehenge	November 1, 2004	October 31, 2006			
Plague Hunters	November 1, 2004	October 31, 2006			
Shalom Y'all	November 1, 2004	October 31, 2006			
The Homes of FDR	November 1, 2004	January 31, 2008			
Years of Darkness	November 5, 2004	November 4, 2008			
Gettysburg and Stories of Valor	November 5, 2004	November 4, 2012		^{HDTV}	
Lewis and Clark: Crossing the Centuries	November 7, 2004	November 6, 2016			
Hudson River Journeys	November 7, 2004	November 6, 2016			
Everett Raymond Kinstler: An Artist's Journey	November 7, 2004	November 6, 2008			
Orphan Orca: Saving Springer	November 7, 2004	November 6, 2012			
Behind the Scenes at Monarch of the Glen	December 1, 2004	November 30, 2006			
Reluctant Saint: Francis of Assisi	December 1, 2004	December 31, 2006			
Storm Warriors: Heroes of the Shipwreck Coast	December 1, 2004	November 30, 2006			
The Four Freedoms	January 1, 2005	December 31, 2007			
The Power of Integrity	January 1, 2005	December 31, 2006			
Cuba Mía: Portrait of an All-Woman Orchestra	January 2, 2005	January 1, 2017			
Alma's Jazzy Marriage	January 2, 2005	January 1, 2013			
Young Lincoln	February 1, 2005	January 31, 2017			
Ernest J. Gaines: Louisiana Stories	February 1, 2005	January 31, 2017			
Welcome to North Korea	February 1, 2005	January 31, 2007			
Scandalize My Name: Stories from the Blacklist	February 1, 2005	January 31, 2007			
Stonehenge	February 1, 2005	January 31, 2007			
Solomon Butcher: Frontier Photographer	February 28, 2005	February 27, 2008		^{HDTV}	
Belfast Taxi	March 1, 2005	February 28, 2007			
1914: The War Revolution	March 1, 2005	February 28, 2007			
Railroad Empire	March 6, 2005	March 5, 2013			
Drive-In Movie Memories	April 1, 2005	March 31, 2007			
Drive-In Movie Memories	October 31, 2009	October 30, 2011			
Drive-In Movie Memories	June 30, 2012	June 29, 2014			
Exodus & Freedom with Dick Cavett	April 1, 2005	June 30, 2013	(Note: Originally titled Exodus & Freedom.)		
Desperate Hours	April 1, 2005	March 31, 2017		^{APT WORLDWIDE}	
Children and Autism: Time Is Brain	April 1, 2005	March 31, 2017			
Pure Gold: The 2002 International Violin Competition of Indianapolis	April 1, 2005	March 31, 2009			
Terezin: Resistance and Revival	April 1, 2005	March 31, 2008			
Undying Love	April 1, 2005	March 31, 2007			
Marion's Triumph: Surviving History's Nightmare	April 1, 2005	March 31, 2007	(Note: The 2nd release was planned to end on September 16, 2014.)		
Marion's Triumph: Surviving History's Nightmare	September 17, 2012	November 30, 2012	(Note: The 2nd release was planned to end on September 16, 2014.)		
Marion's Triumph: Surviving History's Nightmare	April 1, 2014	March 31, 2018	(Note: The 2nd release was planned to end on September 16, 2014.)		
Wounded in Action	April 2, 2005	April 1, 2008			
Valley of Tears	April 2, 2005	April 1, 2007		^{LPB}	
Billfish: A Challenge for Survival	April 3, 2005	December 31, 2007			
Thunderbolts of Millville	April 3, 2005	April 2, 2013		^{HDTV}	
Never Too Old for Gold	April 3, 2005	April 2, 2013	(Note: Planned to be a 13-part series.)		
Indus River: Journey of a Lifetime	April 3, 2005	April 2, 2017			
Livable Landscapes: By Chance or by Choice?	April 3, 2005	April 2, 2009		^{ITVS}	
Limón: A Life Beyond Words	April 10, 2005	April 9, 2007		^{LPB}	
Re-Connections	April 10, 2005	April 9, 2013			
A Beautiful Blend: Mixed Race in America	May 1, 2005	April 30, 2007			
A Most Unlikely Hero	May 1, 2005	April 30, 2011			
No Ordinary Joe: Erasing the Stigma of Mental Illness	May 1, 2005	April 30, 2009			
Spanning Time: America's Covered Bridges	May 8, 2005	May 7, 2017			
Vatican City & the Papacy with Burt Wolf	May 21, 2005	May 20, 2017			
Fathers & Daughters: Journeys of the Heart	May 27, 2005	May 26, 2013			
Adrift	June 5, 2005	June 4, 2009			
Ketchup: King of Condiments	July 1, 2005	June 30, 2017			
Women of K2	July 1, 2005	June 30, 2007			
Pennsylvania Breweries	July 3, 2005	July 2, 2013			
Escape from Iran: The Hollywood Option	August 1, 2005	January 31, 2008			
Escape from Iran: The Hollywood Option	February 15, 2013	February 14, 2015			
Galileo's Sons	August 1, 2005	July 31, 2007			
Displaced! Miracle at St. Ottilien	August 1, 2005	July 31, 2007			
In the Key of G	September 1, 2005	August 31, 2016			
This Obedience	September 1, 2005	August 31, 2007			
Vertical Ascent	September 1, 2005	August 31, 2007			
Weathered Secrets: Barns of the American Midwest	September 1, 2005	August 31, 2007			
Here's Looking at You!	September 1, 2005	August 31, 2007			
For the Love of Their Brother	September 1, 2005	August 31, 2012	(Note: 2005 version.)		
The Highlands Rediscovered	September 4, 2005	September 3, 2013			
13 Seconds: The Kent State Shootings	October 1, 2005	March 31, 2008			
A Show of Courage	October 1, 2005	September 30, 2009			
A Doula Story	October 1, 2005	September 30, 2009			
Faces of a Children's Hospital	October 1, 2005	September 30, 2010			
Killing Silence: Taking on the Mafia in Sicily	November 1, 2005	October 31, 2007			
Gladiators: The Brutal Truth	November 1, 2005	October 31, 2007			
Joseph Cardinal Ratzinger: My Vatican	November 1, 2005	October 31, 2007			
Laugh at Us: The Merry Pranksters Theatrical Troupe...For the Exceptionally Talented	November 1, 2005	October 31, 2017			
Untold Stories: Mina Miller Edison, The Wizard's Wife	November 1, 2005	October 31, 2017			
Gallery: The National Museum of the American Indian	November 1, 2005	October 31, 2017			
Aleut Story	November 1, 2005	October 31, 2017		^{VMM}	
American Values: American Wilderness	November 1, 2005	October 31, 2017			
O Christmas Tree	November 27, 2005	December 31, 2006	(Note: Planned to end on November 26, 2009.)		
On Detour with Manny Farber	January 1, 2006	December 31, 2017			
The Long Way Home	January 1, 2006	December 31, 2007			
The London Underground Map	January 1, 2006	December 31, 2007			
The Danish Solution	January 1, 2006	August 31, 2007			
The Other Side of Suez	January 1, 2006	June 30, 2008			
Simon Wiesenthal: The Man Who Hunted Nazis	January 27, 2006	January 26, 2008			
Hit by Lightning	February 1, 2006	January 31, 2008			
Ice Pilots	February 1, 2006	January 31, 2008			
Summer Hill	February 1, 2006	January 31, 2018			
Ballycastle	March 1, 2006	February 28, 2018			
Shipping Out: The Story of America's Seafaring Women	March 1, 2006	February 28, 2018			
Best Friends: The Power of Sisterhood	March 1, 2006	February 28, 2015			
The Brighton Bomb	March 1, 2006	February 29, 2008			
Damrell's Fire	April 1, 2006	March 31, 2010			
The Week They Elected the Pope	April 1, 2006	April 30, 2008			
A Gullwing at Twilight: The Bonneville Ride of John Fitch	April 2, 2006	April 1, 2010		^{APT WORLDWIDE}	
Dayton Codebreakers	April 2, 2006	April 1, 2018			
Alive from PopTech	May 1, 2006	April 30, 2018		^{APT WORLDWIDE}	
Women of Tibet: Gyalyum Chemo - The Great Mother	May 1, 2006	April 30, 2009			
Out of the Shadow	May 1, 2006	April 30, 2016			
Monkey Dance	May 1, 2006	April 30, 2010		^{ITVS}	
The Hawaiians: Reflecting Spirit	May 1, 2006	April 30, 2010			
Mothers and Sons: Raising Compassionate	May 1, 2006	April 30, 2013			
Horizon: Lost Civilization of Peru	June 30, 2006	June 29, 2008			
The Four Chaplains: Sacrifice at Sea	June 30, 2006	June 29, 2008			
Untold Stories: The First Pitch	September 1, 2006	August 31, 2009			
Values Go to School	September 1, 2006	August 31, 2010			
Transformation: Building the Rubin Museum of Art	September 3, 2006	September 2, 2010			
Carhenge: Genius or Junk?	September 3, 2006	September 2, 2014			
A Legacy of Achievement: The Italian Americans	October 1, 2006	September 30, 2014			
Olympic Dreams	October 1, 2006	March 31, 2010			
Today's Families: The Wonder of Toddlers	October 1, 2006	September 30, 2011			
A Gathering of Heroes	November 1, 2006	October 31, 2016			
Josef and Anni Albers: Art Is Everywhere	November 1, 2006	October 31, 2014			
Normandie: A Legendary Liner	November 1, 2006	October 31, 2008			
The 49th Star: Creating Alaska	November 3, 2006	November 2, 2014			
The Hope Givers	December 1, 2006	November 30, 2016			
In Endless Song: 20 Years of the Indianapolis Children's Choir	December 1, 2006	November 30, 2016			
Revisiting Brideshead	December 1, 2006	November 30, 2008			
Life Before Life	December 31, 2006	February 28, 2009			
Good to Great	January 1, 2007	December 31, 2008			
Living Courageously: The Spirit of Woman	January 1, 2007	December 31, 2014			
Tobacco Money Feeds My Money	January 5, 2007	January 4, 2009			
Dance Party: The Teenarama Story	February 1, 2007	January 31, 2011			
Winged Migration	March 1, 2007	August 31, 2007	(Note: Feature film genre in the 1st release.)		
Winged Migration	August 4, 2010	August 3, 2011	(Note: Feature film genre in the 1st release.)		
Rat Pack: A Conference of Cool	March 1, 2007	February 28, 2009			
Hold Your Breath	April 1, 2007	March 31, 2010			
Secrets of Mary Magdalene	April 1, 2007	March 31, 2009			
The SuperFight: Marciano vs. Ali	April 1, 2007	March 31, 2009			
Knee Deep	April 1, 2007	July 31, 2017	(Note: A stand-alone special from Independent Lens.)		
You're Not Alone	April 1, 2007	September 30, 2009	(Note: Originally titled You Are Not Alone.)		
Albert Paley: In Search of the Sentinel	April 1, 2007	March 31, 2015			
Racing to Bermuda: A Century on the Ocean	April 1, 2007	March 31, 2013	(Note: Originally titled The Newport to Bermuda Centennial Ocean Race.)		
Swim for the River	April 1, 2007	March 31, 2011			
The Olive and the Tree: The Secret Strength of the Druze	April 1, 2007	March 31, 2011			
Villa De Alburquerque	April 1, 2007	October 16, 2010			
Beyond Theology: What Would Jesus Do?	April 1, 2007	March 31, 2019	(Note: Originally titled WWJD: What Would Jesus Do?.)		
A Blackfeet Encounter	April 6, 2007	April 5, 2017		^{VMM}	
People's Palace	April 8, 2007	April 7, 2011			
The Remarkable Red Hat Society	April 22, 2007	April 21, 2010			
Sketching the Silk Road	April 29, 2007	April 28, 2010			
Do Not Go Gently	May 1, 2007	April 30, 2019			
Visioning Tibet	May 1, 2007	April 30, 2011			
The Last Ridge	May 4, 2007	May 3, 2019			
Front Wards, Back Wards	May 13, 2007	May 12, 2011		^{ITVS}	
A Sidewalk Astronomer	June 1, 2007	May 31, 2009			
Accidents in Space	June 30, 2007	June 29, 2009			
Crown Princess Märtha: The American Story	June 30, 2007	June 29, 2011			
Liberty or Death	July 1, 2007	June 30, 2019			
Acting Through Life	July 1, 2007	June 30, 2009			
Liquid Stage: The Lure of Surfing	July 29, 2007	July 28, 2019			
God on the Brain	August 1, 2007	July 31, 2009			
The Day We Learned to Think	August 1, 2007	July 31, 2009	(Note: A stand-alone special from Horizon.)		
Tutankhamun and the Golden Age of the Pharaohs	September 1, 2007	August 31, 2019			
There Is a Bridge	September 1, 2007	November 30, 2009			
Looking for an Icon	September 1, 2007	August 31, 2009			
Stories from the Heart	September 1, 2007	August 31, 2009			
Turning the Tide	September 1, 2007	August 31, 2011	(Note: 2007 version.)		
Down in the Old Belt: Voices from the Tobacco South	September 7, 2007	September 6, 2011			
The Pain of Depression: A Journey Through the Darkness	October 1, 2007	September 30, 2016			
Geocache	November 1, 2007	October 31, 2015			
Ghosts of the Baltic Sea	November 1, 2007	October 31, 2009			
Heritage or Hate?	November 1, 2007	October 31, 2009			
The Ultimate Resource	November 2, 2007	November 1, 2011		^{APT WORLDWIDE}	
Crank: Darkness on the Edge of Town	November 16, 2007	November 15, 2010		^{ITVS}	
Arctic Bound	December 1, 2007	November 30, 2010			
Colorblind	January 1, 2008	December 31, 2011			
Say Amen, Somebody	January 1, 2008	December 31, 2009			
Rolling	January 6, 2008	January 5, 2012			
Third Ward TX	February 1, 2008	January 31, 2012		^{ITVS}	
Come Walk in My Shoes	February 1, 2008	January 31, 2012			
The Better Hour: The Legacy of William Wilberforce	February 1, 2008	January 31, 2011			
The Clinton 12	February 1, 2008	February 28, 2014			
The Jimi Hendrix Experience: American Landing	March 1, 2008	February 28, 2010			
Beyond Wiseguys: Italian Americans & the Movies	March 1, 2008	February 28, 2010			
Arabian Horse: The Ancient Breed	March 16, 2008	March 15, 2012			
The World Was Ours	March 30, 2008	March 29, 2011			
Demystifying Dyslexia	April 1, 2008	March 31, 2012			
The Gefilte Fish Chronicles	April 1, 2008	March 31, 2010			
Targets: Reporters in Iraq	April 1, 2008	March 31, 2010			
The Head	April 1, 2008	March 31, 2010			
The Transformation Age: Surviving a Technology Revolution with Robert X. Cringely	April 18, 2008	April 17, 2013		^{APT WORLDWIDE}	
Jail Talk	May 1, 2008	April 30, 2016			
Gates of the Arctic: Alaska’s Brooks Range	May 1, 2008	April 30, 2012			
Kung Fu Journey to the East	May 1, 2008	April 30, 2011			
Placing Out: The Orphan Trains	May 1, 2008	April 30, 2017			
Citizen Tanouye	May 1, 2008	April 30, 2010			
The Pact	May 4, 2008	May 3, 2014			
Faces of Change	June 1, 2008	May 31, 2012			
10 Questions for the Dalai Lama	June 1, 2008	May 31, 2010			
Leisurama	June 1, 2008	May 31, 2014			
CCTV: You Are Being Watched	June 30, 2008	June 29, 2010			
3, 2, 1, Fireworks	July 1, 2008	July 31, 2017			
Apollo 8: Christmas at the Moon	July 1, 2008	June 30, 2010			
The Games for the Gods	July 1, 2008	June 30, 2010			
White Elephant	September 1, 2008	August 31, 2010			
Rumi Returning	September 1, 2008	August 31, 2011			
Murder House	September 5, 2008	September 4, 2011		^{APT WORLDWIDE}	
War Bonds: The Songs and Letters of World War II	September 7, 2008	September 6, 2017			
Ghosts on the Underground	October 1, 2008	September 30, 2010			
Ghosts on the Underground	October 1, 2013	September 30, 2015			
Waterbuster	November 1, 2008	October 31, 2016		^{VMM}	
Weaving Worlds	November 1, 2008	October 31, 2016		^{ITVS}^{VMM}	
Sanibel to Siberia: The Story of a World War II Memorial	November 1, 2008	October 31, 2017			
Last Ghost of War	November 1, 2008	October 31, 2011			
A Ripple in the Water: Healing Through Art	November 1, 2008	October 31, 2016			
It All Adds Up	February 1, 2009	January 31, 2018			
Lincoln: Prelude to the Presidency	February 1, 2009	January 31, 2014			
Interpreting Ancient Chinese Fashion	March 1, 2009	February 29, 2012	(Note: Originally titled Interpreting Ancient Fashion.)		
Remember 1929: Year of the Great Crash	March 1, 2009	February 28, 2011			
Dickens' Secret Lover	March 1, 2009	February 28, 2011	(Note: Biography genre in the 1st release.)		
Dickens' Secret Lover	February 1, 2012	January 31, 2014	(Note: Biography genre in the 1st release.)		
Bhutan: Taking the Middle Path to Happiness	April 1, 2009	March 31, 2017			
Living On: Remembering the Holocaust	April 1, 2009	March 31, 2019			
Sgt. Fitch: The Legacy of Sarg Records	April 5, 2009	April 4, 2013		^{ITVS}	
Following Dreams	May 1, 2009	April 30, 2017			
Okie Noodling II	May 3, 2009	May 2, 2015			
The Call of the Wild	May 3, 2009	May 2, 2015			
Reno Historic Races	May 3, 2009	May 2, 2019			
Apollo 17: Final Footprints on the Moon	June 30, 2009	June 29, 2011			
Colour of War: Adolf Hitler	June 30, 2009	June 29, 2011			
The Moving Earth	August 1, 2009	July 31, 2011			
Living in the Big Empty	August 2, 2009	August 1, 2019			
Going on 13	September 1, 2009	August 30, 2013		^{ITVS}^{LPB}	
Gearing Up	September 6, 2009	September 5, 2011			
Pidgin: The Voice of Hawaii	September 6, 2009	September 5, 2017			
Hard Problems: The Road to the World's Toughest Math Contest	October 4, 2009	October 3, 2025			
Journey into Buddhism: Vajra Sky Over Tibet	October 4, 2009	October 3, 2017			
Princesses of the World	October 31, 2009	October 30, 2011			
Unconquered Seminoles	November 1, 2009	October 31, 2018			
For the Rights of All: Ending Jim Crow in Alaska	November 1, 2009	October 31, 2017		^{VMM}	
Mr. Alaska: Bob Bartlett Goes to Washington	November 1, 2009	October 31, 2013			
Vizcaya	November 1, 2009	October 31, 2011			
Legends of the Lake	November 8, 2009	November 7, 2019			
Hats Off	December 1, 2009	November 30, 2011			

== 2010s ==
Title	Premiere date	End date	Note(s)	Legend(s)	Source(s)
A Ripple of Hope	January 15, 2010	January 14, 2012		^{APT WORLDWIDE}	
A Ripple of Hope	January 6, 2013	January 5, 2016		^{APT WORLDWIDE}	
Scarred Justice: The Orangeburg Massacre 1968	February 1, 2010	January 31, 2013		^{ITVS}	
Passing Poston: An American Story	February 1, 2010	January 31, 2016			
Flappers, Speakeasies, and the Birth of Modern Culture	March 1, 2010	February 29, 2012			
Hide and Seek	April 1, 2010	March 31, 2012			
Stop the Presses	April 1, 2010	March 31, 2012			
Battle of Wills	April 1, 2010	March 31, 2012			
Agatha Christie's Garden	April 1, 2010	March 31, 2012			
The Adventists	April 1, 2010	March 31, 2016			
Roots of Health	April 1, 2010	March 31, 2016			
Seeking Art in Shanghai	April 1, 2010	March 31, 2013			
A Necessary Journey	April 1, 2010	March 31, 2013			
Death of the Old West	April 4, 2010	April 3, 2018			
Naturally Obsessed: The Making of a Scientist	April 4, 2010	April 3, 2017			
Three Big Ideas: Principles for Post-Recession Success	May 2, 2010	May 1, 2016			
A Time for Champions	June 7, 2010	June 6, 2012			
Apollo	July 1, 2010	June 30, 2012			
8: Ivy League Football and America	August 1, 2010	July 31, 2012			
2501 Migrants: A Journey	August 22, 2010	August 21, 2014		^{LPB}	
As Long as I Remember: American Veteranos	August 22, 2010	August 21, 2014		^{LPB}	
Boyfriends	September 2, 2010	December 31, 2011	(Note: Planned to end on September 1, 2012.)		
Rock Prophecies	September 5, 2010	September 4, 2013			
The Music's Gonna Get You Through	October 1, 2010	September 30, 2017		^{ITVS}	
Unlisted: A Story of Schizophrenia	October 1, 2010	September 30, 2016			
Vintage: The Winemaker's Year	October 1, 2010	September 30, 2012		^{APT WORLDWIDE}	
Walking into the Unknown	October 23, 2010	October 22, 2018		^{VMM}	
Yanks Fight the Kaiser: A National Guard Division in WWI	October 25, 2010	October 24, 2016			
Top Secret Rosies: The Female Computers of WWII	November 1, 2010	October 31, 2012			
Ubaldo	November 7, 2010	November 6, 2018			
Everest: A Climb for Peace	November 7, 2010	November 6, 2016		^{APT WORLDWIDE}	
Terra Antarctica: Rediscovering the Seventh Continent	December 1, 2010	November 30, 2012			
Charlotte: A Royal at War	January 1, 2011	December 31, 2012			
Get the Math	February 15, 2011	February 14, 2026			
Airplay: The Rise and Fall of Rock Radio	February 25, 2011	February 24, 2025			
Jews and Baseball	March 1, 2011	March 31, 2013			
Who Does She Think She Is?	March 8, 2011	March 7, 2013			
Augusta's Master Plan: From Sherman's March to Arnie's Army	March 27, 2011	March 26, 2014			
Over 90 and Loving It	March 29, 2011	March 28, 2019			
Google World	April 1, 2011	March 31, 2013			
Funny Business	April 1, 2011	March 31, 2013			
Four Seasons Lodge	April 1, 2011	March 31, 2013		^{APT WORLDWIDE}	
Autism: Coming of Age	April 1, 2011	March 31, 2017			
Visa Dream	April 3, 2011	April 2, 2021			
Our Summer in Tehran	April 3, 2011	April 2, 2015		^{ITVS}	
Typeface	April 3, 2011	April 2, 2017			
Dreamers Theater	April 3, 2011	April 2, 2017			
Teenage Witness: The Fanya Gottesfeld Heller Story	April 3, 2011	April 2, 2013		^{APT WORLDWIDE}	
Decoding Autism	April 3, 2011	April 2, 2013			
Four Days at Dragon*Con	April 5, 2011	April 4, 2013			
Olmsted and America's Urban Parks	April 17, 2011	April 16, 2016			
Reverence: Life in the Ballet	May 2, 2011	May 1, 2015			
Journey into Buddhism: Prajna Earth	May 22, 2011	May 21, 2017			
Journey into Buddhism: Dharma River	May 22, 2011	May 21, 2017			
Above Yellowstone	June 1, 2011	June 30, 2013			
Southern Belle	July 1, 2011	June 30, 2017		^{APT WORLDWIDE}^{ITVS}	
Praying with Lior	September 1, 2011	August 31, 2013			
Long Distance Warrior	September 4, 2011	September 3, 2014			
Grab	November 1, 2011	October 31, 2016		^{VMM}	
The Pit	November 1, 2011	October 31, 2013		^{APT WORLDWIDE}	
Marching Once More: 60 Years After the Battle of the Bulge	November 1, 2011	October 31, 2015			
Take 2	November 7, 2011	November 6, 2017			
Colored Frames	November 7, 2011	November 6, 2015			
Angels	December 1, 2011	December 31, 2014	(Note: 2010 version.)		
All the Queen's Men	December 1, 2011	November 30, 2013			
The Game Changers	January 1, 2012	December 31, 2016			
The Horsemen Cometh	January 2, 2012	January 1, 2014			
You'll Always Be with Me	January 4, 2012	January 3, 2016			
Globalization at the Crossroads with Hernando de Soto	January 4, 2012	January 3, 2014			
Jews and Baseball: An American Love Story	January 4, 2012	March 31, 2013			
Hockey: More Than a Game	February 6, 2012	November 26, 2016			
Bonsai People: The Vision of Muhammad Yunus	March 7, 2012	March 6, 2014		^{APT WORLDWIDE}	
Apollo 17: The Untold Story of the Last Men on the Moon	April 1, 2012	March 31, 2014			
Jewish Soldiers in Blue & Gray	April 1, 2012	March 31, 2014			
JFK: A Homecoming	April 1, 2012	March 31, 2014			
Hitler's Lost Soldier	April 1, 2012	March 31, 2014			
Circus Dreams	April 1, 2012	March 31, 2016		^{APT WORLDWIDE}	
Global Health Frontiers: Foul Water, Fiery Serpent	April 1, 2012	March 31, 2016		^{APT WORLDWIDE}	
Words of the Titanic	April 15, 2012	April 14, 2014			
Yoo-Hoo, Mrs. Goldberg	May 1, 2012	April 30, 2014			
When the Mountain Calls: Nepal, Tibet, Bhutan	May 1, 2012	April 30, 2016			
The Last Chapter	May 2, 2012	May 1, 2018			
World Peace and Other 4th Grade Achievements	May 6, 2012	May 5, 2014		^{APT WORLDWIDE}	
Joann Sfar Draws from Memory	May 6, 2012	May 5, 2015			
Different Is the New Normal: Living a Life with Tourette's	May 15, 2012	May 14, 2013			
Stagestruck: Confessions from Summer Stock	July 1, 2012	June 30, 2026			
Dreamland	September 2, 2012	September 1, 2017		^{APT WORLDWIDE}	
The Sierra #3 Locomotive: A Star Is Reborn	September 2, 2012	September 1, 2014			
By Royal Appointment	November 1, 2012	October 31, 2014			
Only a Number	November 1, 2012	October 31, 2015			
Restaging Shelter	November 4, 2012	November 3, 2018			
Tony Robinson's London Games Unearthed	January 1, 2013	December 31, 2014			
Schools That Change Communities	January 1, 2013	December 31, 2016			
Humble Beauty: Skid Row Artists	January 6, 2013	January 5, 2019			
The Black Kungfu Experience	February 1, 2013	January 31, 2017		^{ITVS}	
Out of Order	February 1, 2013	January 31, 2016			
Water Pressures	March 20, 2013	March 19, 2016			
Echoes of the Holocaust	April 1, 2013	March 31, 2017			
Crisis of Faith	April 1, 2013	March 31, 2016			
Rescue in the Philippines: Refuge from the Holocaust	April 1, 2013	March 31, 2015	(Note: Originally titled Rescue in the Philippines.)	^{APT WORLDWIDE}	
The Bull Runners of Pamplona	April 1, 2013	March 31, 2015			
Birdmen: The Original Dream of Flight	April 1, 2013	March 31, 2015			
Return	April 1, 2013	March 31, 2015	(Note: 2012 version.)		
War Zone/Comfort Zone	April 2, 2013	April 1, 2016			
Silver King: The Birth of Big Game Fishing	April 3, 2013	April 2, 2016			
The 1962 World's Fair: When Seattle Invented the Future	April 7, 2013	April 6, 2019			
The Lost Bird Project	April 7, 2013	April 6, 2019		^{APT WORLDWIDE}	
Words of Captain Scott	May 1, 2013	April 30, 2015			
Frozen North: Sir Hubert's Forgotten Submarine Expedition	May 1, 2013	April 30, 2015			
The Lost Years of Zora Neale Hurston	May 5, 2013	May 4, 2016			
Undaunted: The Forgotten Giants of the Allegheny Observatory	May 19, 2013	May 18, 2016			
Anthem	June 21, 2013	June 20, 2017			
Magic Skies: A History of Fireworks	July 1, 2013	July 5, 2015			
Hitler's Favourite Royal	August 1, 2013	July 31, 2015			
Dick Winters: "Hang Tough"	September 1, 2013	August 31, 2025			
Global Health Frontiers: Dark Forest, Black Fly	September 1, 2013	August 31, 2015		^{APT WORLDWIDE}	
Balto: A Hero from Alaska	September 1, 2013	August 31, 2015			
Monty Python Conquers America	September 1, 2013	August 31, 2015			
The Adventists 2	September 1, 2013	August 31, 2015			
The Adventists 2	January 1, 2016	December 31, 2017			
Outside the Box	September 1, 2013	August 31, 2017			
Young Stars of Ballet	September 3, 2013	September 2, 2017			
Invisible Women: Forgotten Artists of Florence	September 3, 2013	September 2, 2017			
Buen Provecho! Florida's Spanish Flavor	September 8, 2013	September 7, 2025		^{CREATE}	
The Real McCoy	September 8, 2013	September 7, 2018			
The Real McCoy	February 4, 2020	February 3, 2026			
The Android Prophesy	October 1, 2013	October 31, 2015			
The Devil We Know	October 1, 2013	October 31, 2016			
The Kennedy Half-Century	October 21, 2013	October 20, 2016		^{APT WORLDWIDE}	
Urban Rez	November 1, 2013	October 31, 2019		^{VMM}	
Climbed Every Mountain with Nicholas Hammond	November 1, 2013	October 31, 2015			
Refuge: Stories of the Selfhelp Home	November 1, 2013	October 31, 2016			
Pride and Prejudice: Having a Ball	November 1, 2013	October 31, 2015			
Easy Like Water	November 3, 2013	November 2, 2016		^{APT WORLDWIDE}	
Shakespeare Lost, Shakespeare Found	November 3, 2013	November 2, 2015			
Set for Life	November 4, 2013	November 3, 2017			
Lyndon B. Johnson: Succeeding Kennedy	November 15, 2013	November 14, 2015			
Doc Martin: Revealed	November 28, 2013	December 31, 2016			
Doc Martin: Revealed	January 1, 2017	December 31, 2018			
Blenko Glass: Behind the Scenes	November 29, 2013	December 28, 2015			
Blenko Glass: Behind the Scenes	March 1, 2016	March 31, 2018			
Blenko Glass: Behind the Scenes	November 23, 2018	December 22, 2020			
Earthrise: Apollo 8 and the First Lunar Voyage	December 1, 2013	December 31, 2015		^{APT WORLDWIDE}	
One Night in March	February 1, 2014	January 31, 2026			
Looking Over Jordan: African Americans and the War	February 1, 2014	January 31, 2018			
Midsomer Murders: Super Sleuths	March 1, 2014	February 29, 2016			
Remembering the Sirens	March 2, 2014	March 1, 2017			
Jerzy Popieluszko: Messenger of the Truth	April 1, 2014	March 31, 2016			
The American Invasion	April 1, 2014	March 31, 2016			
The Blueprint: The Story of Adventist Education	April 1, 2014	March 31, 2016			
Spies Beneath Berlin	April 1, 2014	March 31, 2016			
Sosúa: Make a Better World	April 1, 2014	March 31, 2016			
Breaking & Entering	April 1, 2014	March 31, 2016			
The Queen's Mother in Law	April 1, 2014	March 31, 2016			
Skokie: Invaded But Not Conquered	April 1, 2014	March 31, 2017			
Escape in the Pacific: 1943	April 2, 2014	April 1, 2017	(Note: On-screen title 4-4-43: Lt. Col. William Edwin Dyess and the Greatest Story of the War in the Pacific.)		
Aging Matters: End of Life	April 6, 2014	April 5, 2018			
Cosplay! Crafting a Secret Identity	April 7, 2014	April 6, 2016			
Running of the Bulls	May 4, 2014	May 3, 2015			
Great Museums: "Elevated Thinking" The High Line in New York City	May 5, 2014	May 4, 2026			
Paley on Park Avenue: New York City	May 5, 2014	May 4, 2016			
The Charles W. Morgan	May 6, 2014	May 5, 2017			
The Space Shuttle: Flying for Me	June 1, 2014	June 30, 2016			
The Day It Snowed in Miami	June 1, 2014	June 30, 2016		^{APT WORLDWIDE}	
Give It All Away: Newman's Own Recipe for Success	June 3, 2014	June 2, 2017			
Little League: A History	July 1, 2014	June 30, 2016			
Project: Shattered Silence	August 1, 2014	July 31, 2026			
Doc Martin: Behind the Scenes	August 1, 2014	July 31, 2016			
Drying for Freedom	August 1, 2014	July 31, 2016			
Children of 9/11	September 1, 2014	September 30, 2016			
Fleeced: Speaking Out Against Senior Financial Abuse	September 7, 2014	September 6, 2016			
The Silent Majority	September 7, 2014	September 6, 2016			
A Fire in the Forest: The Life and Legacy of the Ba'al Shem Tov	September 25, 2014	September 24, 2019			
Trial by Fire: Lives Re-Forged	October 1, 2014	September 30, 2017			
Living with Parkinson's	October 1, 2014	September 30, 2017			
Race to Nowhere	October 1, 2014	September 30, 2017			
Thinking Money: The Psychology Behind Our Best and Worst Financial Decisions	October 16, 2014	October 15, 2016			
Growing Cities	October 24, 2014	October 23, 2017		^{APT WORLDWIDE}	
Queen Victoria and the Crippled Kaiser	November 1, 2014	October 31, 2016			
Queen Victoria and the Crippled Kaiser	March 1, 2017	February 28, 2019			
Inside Asprey: Luxury by Royal Appointment	November 1, 2014	October 31, 2016			
Wagonmasters	November 1, 2014	October 31, 2016			
The Editor and the Dragon: Horace Carter Fights the Klan	November 2, 2014	November 1, 2017			
David Bromberg Unsung Treasure	November 2, 2014	November 1, 2016			
Compadre Huashayo	November 3, 2014	November 2, 2017			
Divine Discontent: Charles Proteus Steinmetz	November 4, 2014	November 3, 2017			
Royals at War: 1939-1945	December 1, 2014	November 30, 2016			
Out of Print	December 1, 2014	November 30, 2016			
@HOME	February 1, 2015	January 31, 2018			
Doc Martin's Portwenn	February 27, 2015	February 28, 2017			
Doc Martin's Portwenn	March 1, 2017	February 28, 2019			
Doc Martin's Portwenn	March 1, 2019	February 28, 2021			
No Evidence of Disease	March 4, 2015	March 26, 2025		^{APT WORLDWIDE}	
Kids Rock Cancer	March 25, 2015	March 24, 2017			
Window in the Waves: The Flower Garden Banks	April 1, 2015	March 31, 2019			
Mary Lou Williams: The Lady Who Swings the Band	April 1, 2015	March 31, 2019		^{ITVS}	
Hidden Killers of the Tudor Home	April 1, 2015	March 31, 2017			
Compassion for Those We Love: A Town Meeting on Caregiving for Alzheimer's in the Hispanic Community	April 1, 2015	March 31, 2017			
Dressing America: Tales from the Garment Center	April 1, 2015	March 31, 2017			
Lost Child: Sayon's Journey	April 23, 2015	April 22, 2020			
The Salinas Project	May 3, 2015	May 2, 2020			
Art Basel: A Portrait	June 1, 2015	June 30, 2025		^{APT WORLDWIDE}	
Thin Ice: The Inside Story of Climate Science	July 1, 2015	June 30, 2018		^{APT WORLDWIDE}	
Fixed: The Science/Fiction of Human Enhancement	July 17, 2015	July 16, 2018		^{APT WORLDWIDE}	
1964: The Fight for a Right	August 1, 2015	July 31, 2025			
Starboard Light	August 30, 2015	August 29, 2017			
Pope Francis: The Sinner	September 1, 2015	August 31, 2017			
The Dambusters' Great Escape	September 1, 2015	August 31, 2017			
The 25,000 Mile Love Story	September 9, 2015	September 8, 2016	(Note: Planned to end on September 8, 2018.)		
Great Museums - Sound Tracks: The Rock & Roll Hall of Fame & Museum	September 13, 2015	September 12, 2017			
Salsa! The Dance Sensation	October 1, 2015	September 30, 2025			
Dear Albania	October 1, 2015	September 30, 2017		^{APT WORLDWIDE}	
Global Health Frontiers: Trachoma - Defeating a Blinding Curse	October 1, 2015	September 30, 2017		^{APT WORLDWIDE}	
Everyone Has a Place	October 4, 2015	October 3, 2017			
Igliqtiqsiuġvigruaq [Swift Water Place]	November 1, 2015	October 31, 2019			
Doolittle's Raiders: A Final Toast	November 1, 2015	October 31, 2025			
The Galilei Files: Science and Faith	November 1, 2015	October 31, 2017			
Elizabeth I: War on Terror	November 1, 2015	October 31, 2017			
Ball of Confusion: The 1968 Election	November 1, 2015	October 31, 2018			
Chaplin: The Legend of the Century	December 1, 2015	November 30, 2017			
The English Gentleman: An Illustrated Guide	January 1, 2016	December 31, 2017			
Butterfly Town, USA	January 1, 2016	December 31, 2017			
Butterfly Town, USA	January 1, 2019	December 31, 2024			
The Verdigris: In Search of Will Rogers	January 1, 2016	December 31, 2021			
Roadtrip Nation: Ready to Rise	February 1, 2016	January 31, 2026			
The Girls in the Band	February 1, 2016	January 31, 2018			
Oyler: One School, One Year	February 1, 2016	January 31, 2020			
Joan of Arc: God's Warrior	March 1, 2016	February 28, 2018			
Secrets in the Bones: The Hunt for the Black Death Killer	March 1, 2016	February 28, 2018	(Note: A stand-alone special from The Nature of Things.)		
Secrets in the Bones: The Hunt for the Black Death Killer	October 1, 2020	September 30, 2022	(Note: A stand-alone special from The Nature of Things.)		
Raising Ms. President	March 14, 2016	March 13, 2018			
Far Afield: A Conservation Love Story	April 1, 2016	March 31, 2023			
Prince Philip: The Plot to Make a King	April 1, 2016	March 31, 2018			
When I'm 65	April 3, 2016	April 2, 2020			
Red Dot on the Ocean: The Matthew Rutherford Story	April 15, 2016	April 14, 2018			
Roadtrip Nation: Being You	May 1, 2016	April 30, 2026			
Bard in the Backcountry	May 1, 2016	April 30, 2022			
Fireworks: The 2014 International Violin Competition of Indianapolis	May 1, 2016	April 30, 2020			
War Journal: The Incredible World War II Escape of Major Damon "Rocky" Gause	May 1, 2016	April 30, 2018			
Soar	May 2, 2016	May 1, 2020			
Heroes on Deck: World War II On Lake Michigan	May 19, 2016	May 18, 2018	(Note: Distributed by NETA (aka National Educational Telecommunications Association) from 2023 to 2026.)		
The Test	July 5, 2016	July 4, 2018			
Shifting Sands: On the Path to Sustainability	August 7, 2016	August 6, 2019			
For the Love of Their Brother	August 26, 2016	August 25, 2017	(Note: 2016 version.)		
Secrets of the Longleaf Pine	September 1, 2016	August 31, 2018			
The World's Most Expensive Food	September 1, 2016	August 31, 2018			
The Last Dukes	September 1, 2016	August 31, 2018			
A Writer's Roots: Kurt Vonnegut's Indianapolis	September 3, 2016	September 2, 2024			
A Daring Journey: From Immigration to Education	September 5, 2016	September 4, 2018			
When the World Answered	September 5, 2016	September 4, 2018			
Leaves of Change	September 5, 2016	September 4, 2018			
American Umpire	September 15, 2016	September 14, 2019			
American Reds	September 29, 2016	September 28, 2019			
Ivy League Rumba	October 1, 2016	September 30, 2018			
Monks of Vina	October 1, 2016	September 30, 2019			
Reaching West: Dreams of China's New Generation	October 2, 2016	October 1, 2020			
Beyond the Mirage: The Future of Water in the West	October 2, 2016	October 1, 2025			
Roadtrip Nation: Beyond the Dream	October 12, 2016	October 11, 2018			
Beyond the Divide	November 1, 2016	October 31, 2019			
Sol	November 1, 2016	October 31, 2019			
Roadtrip Nation: The Next Mission	November 1, 2016	October 31, 2025			
The Sturgeon Queens	December 1, 2016	December 31, 2018			
The Queen at 90	December 1, 2016	November 30, 2018			
Projections of America: Movies in Wartime	December 1, 2016	November 30, 2018			
Princes of the Palace	January 1, 2017	December 31, 2018			
Calculating Ada: The Countess of Computing	January 1, 2017	December 31, 2018			
The Majestic Life of Queen Elizabeth II	January 1, 2017	December 31, 2018			
Kaneko's Monumental Risk	February 1, 2017	January 31, 2020			
Tolkien & Lewis: Myth, Imagination, and The Quest for Meaning	March 13, 2017	March 12, 2020			
Streets of Wynwood	March 31, 2017	March 30, 2025			
Ottomans Versus Venetians: Battle for Crete	April 1, 2017	March 31, 2019	(Note: Free program with purchase of Ottomans vs. Christians: The Battle for Europe.)		
The Nuclear Requiem	April 2, 2017	April 1, 2019			
Oceans of Pink	May 1, 2017	April 30, 2025			
Boom Bust Boom	May 1, 2017	April 30, 2019			
The Genius of George Boole	May 1, 2017	April 30, 2019			
Prison Dogs	May 1, 2017	April 30, 2019			
Free to Rock	May 1, 2017	April 30, 2019			
Death on the Matterhorn	May 1, 2017	April 30, 2019			
Engadin: Switzerland's Wilderness	May 1, 2017	April 30, 2019			
Let There Be Light	May 1, 2017	April 30, 2020		^{APT WORLDWIDE}	
Requiem for My Mother	May 14, 2017	May 13, 2019			
Nasser's Republic: The Making of Modern Egypt	June 1, 2017	May 31, 2019			
The Real Sherlock Holmes	June 30, 2017	June 29, 2019			
The Not So Secret Life of the Manic Depressive: 10 Years On	June 30, 2017	June 29, 2019			
Mont Saint-Michel: Resistance Through the Ages	June 30, 2017	June 29, 2019			
Birth of the Living Dead	June 30, 2017	October 31, 2018	(Note: Planned to end on June 29, 2019.)		
Balancing the Scales	July 1, 2017	June 30, 2019			
Gordon Getty: There Will Be Music	July 16, 2017	July 15, 2026			
Before I Kick the Bucket	September 1, 2017	August 31, 2019			
OSIRIS REx: Countdown to Launch	September 3, 2017	September 2, 2026		^{APT WORLDWIDE}	
Remembering Vietnam: The Telling Project	September 6, 2017	September 5, 2021			
It's All in the Game: The Leta Andrews Story	September 23, 2017	September 22, 2021			
Major League Cuban Baseball	October 1, 2017	September 30, 2025			
Kosciuszko: A Man Before His Time	October 1, 2017	September 30, 2019			
Mark Twain's Journey to Jerusalem: Dreamland	October 2, 2017	October 1, 2021			
Fighting on Both Fronts: The Story of the 370th	November 9, 2017	November 8, 2021			
True North: The Sean Swarner Story	January 1, 2018	December 31, 2019		^{APT WORLDWIDE}	
The Mystery of the Roman Skulls	January 1, 2018	December 31, 2019			
Rising from the Rails: The Story of the Pullman Porter	February 1, 2018	January 31, 2020			
Rising from the Rails: The Story of the Pullman Porter	February 1, 2020	January 31, 2022			
Battle on the Booming Grounds: Last Dance of the Prairie Chicken	February 1, 2018	January 31, 2020	(Note: Originally titled Battle on the Booming Grounds.)		
Defeating Cancer: Precision Medicine and Personalized Care	February 1, 2018	January 31, 2021			
Vermeer: Beyond Time	February 1, 2018	January 31, 2022			
Karamu: 100 Years in the House	February 2, 2018	February 1, 2021			
Jesus: Countdown to Calvary	March 15, 2018	April 14, 2020			
Jesus: Countdown to Calvary	March 15, 2021	April 14, 2023			
Jesus: Countdown to Calvary	March 15, 2024	April 14, 2026			
Project Asteroid: Mapping Bennu	April 1, 2018	March 31, 2023		^{APT WORLDWIDE}	
Mystery of the Mountain: Hidden in Plain View	April 1, 2018	March 31, 2020			
Trezoros: The Lost Jews of Kastoria	April 2, 2018	April 1, 2026			
Roadtrip Nation: One Step Closer	April 6, 2018	April 5, 2026			
Still Dreaming	April 14, 2018	April 13, 2022			
Lew Wallace: Shiloh Soldier, Ben-Hur Bard	April 15, 2018	April 14, 2026			
Power To Heal: Medicare And The Civil Rights Revolution	April 26, 2018	April 25, 2021			
The Homeless Chorus Speaks	May 1, 2018	April 30, 2023			
Roadtrip Nation: Future West	May 6, 2018	May 5, 2026			
Too Soon to Forget: The Journey of Younger Onset Alzheimer's Disease	May 6, 2018	May 5, 2024			
The Wrecking Crew	June 1, 2018	May 31, 2020			
JFK: The Last Speech	June 1, 2018	May 31, 2020			
Roadtrip Nation: Beating the Odds	June 3, 2018	June 2, 2026			
The Queen's Favourite Animals	June 30, 2018	June 29, 2020			
The Great Escape	August 1, 2018	July 31, 2020			
Antarctica: Tales from the End of the World	August 1, 2018	July 31, 2020			
NHK Special: Rescuing the Lost Battalion - The Story Behind the Heroes	August 1, 2018	October 31, 2018		^{NHK}	
Dream Land: Little Rock's West 9th Street	September 2, 2018	September 1, 2026			
Bright Lights Little City	September 2, 2018	September 1, 2026			
3 Seconds Behind the Wheels	October 3, 2018	October 2, 2022			
A Place to Stand	October 8, 2018	October 7, 2021			
Roadtrip Nation: Small Town Tech	November 7, 2018	November 6, 2025			
I Hate Jane Austen	December 1, 2018	November 30, 2020			
Looking for Fred Astaire with Darcey Bussell	December 1, 2018	November 30, 2020			
Queen Elizabeth's Battle for Church Music	December 1, 2018	December 31, 2020			
Queen Elizabeth's Battle for Church Music	January 1, 2021	December 31, 2022			
Dreaming of a Jewish Christmas	December 1, 2018	December 31, 2021			
Dreaming of a Jewish Christmas	December 1, 2022	December 31, 2024			
The Fantasy Makers	January 1, 2019	December 31, 2020			
Judi Dench: My Passion for Trees	January 1, 2019	December 31, 2020			
Lady You Shot Me: Life and Death of Sam Cooke	February 1, 2019	January 31, 2021			
Redeeming Uncle Tom: The Josiah Henson Story	February 4, 2019	February 3, 2025			
Anne Morgan's War	February 28, 2019	February 27, 2025			
Riding the Ocean Dragon	April 1, 2019	March 31, 2021			
Homo Spatius	April 1, 2019	March 31, 2021			
A Call to Remember	April 1, 2019	March 31, 2023			
Henry IX: The Lost King	April 1, 2019	March 31, 2021			
Data Mining the Deceased	April 1, 2019	March 31, 2021			
Sherlock Holmes Against Conan Doyle	April 1, 2019	March 31, 2021			
Streit's: Matzo and the American Dream	April 1, 2019	March 31, 2023			
Streit's: Matzo and the American Dream	April 1, 2022	March 31, 2024			
The Secret Weapon That Won WWII	April 21, 2019	September 30, 2022			
Inside Harrods	April 30, 2019	April 29, 2021			
Kimono Revolution	May 1, 2019	April 30, 2021			
Tsuruko's Tea Journey	May 1, 2019	August 31, 2019		^{NHK}	
Crazy	May 2, 2019	May 1, 2025			
D-Day at Pointe-du-Hoc	May 5, 2019	May 4, 2021		^{APT WORLDWIDE}	
Rise of the Superheroes	June 30, 2019	June 29, 2021			
Moonwalk One	June 30, 2019	June 29, 2021			
Outback Rabbis	June 30, 2019	June 29, 2021			
Grenfell: First 24 Hours	June 30, 2019	June 29, 2021			
Arctic Quest	July 1, 2019	June 30, 2021			
Symphony in D	July 1, 2019	June 30, 2021			
Generation Zapped	August 1, 2019	July 31, 2021			
Farther and Sun: A Dyslexic Road Trip	September 1, 2019	August 31, 2021			
Re-Evolution: The Cuban Dream	September 6, 2019	September 5, 2025			
Ultra-Trail Mt. Fuji 2018	October 1, 2019	March 31, 2020		^{NHK}	
Skeletons of the Mary Rose: The New Evidence	November 1, 2019	October 31, 2021			
Jane Austen: Behind Closed Doors	November 1, 2019	October 31, 2021			
Dancing to Happiness with Darcey Bussell	November 1, 2019	October 31, 2021			
Marian Anderson: Once in a Hundred Years	November 1, 2019	October 31, 2022			
Marian Anderson: Once in a Hundred Years	February 1, 2023	January 31, 2025			
Secrets of the Royal Servants	November 1, 2019	October 31, 2021			
Secrets from the Ice	November 1, 2019	October 31, 2021			
The Portillo Expedition: Mystery on Bougainville Island	November 11, 2019	November 10, 2022		^{APT WORLDWIDE}	

== 2020s ==
Title	Premiere date	End date	Note(s)	Legend(s)	Source(s)
The Groveland Four	February 1, 2020	January 31, 2024			
The Music Makers of Gennett Records	February 11, 2020	February 10, 2024			
Singular	March 3, 2020	March 2, 2026			
Troubled Waters: A Turtle's Tale	April 1, 2020	March 31, 2025			
Meet the Mennonites	April 1, 2020	March 31, 2023			
Leni Riefenstahl: Between Hitler and Hollywood	April 1, 2020	March 31, 2023			
The Queen's Grocer: Inside Fortnum & Mason	April 1, 2020	March 31, 2023			
The Cold War Story	April 1, 2020	March 31, 2023			
Risking Light	April 1, 2020	March 31, 2022			
Rowan LeCompte: A Life in Light	April 7, 2020	April 6, 2026			
Inside Jaguar: A Supercar Is Reborn	May 1, 2020	April 30, 2022			
Day One	May 1, 2020	April 30, 2023			
Divided We Fall: Unity Without Tragedy	May 1, 2020	April 30, 2024			
Quakers: The Quiet Revolutionaries	May 1, 2020	September 30, 2024			
Send Me	May 4, 2020	May 3, 2024			
Keepers of the Light	May 19, 2020	May 18, 2022			
An Accidental Studio: The Story of Handmade Films	May 27, 2020	May 26, 2022			
Seats at the Table	June 1, 2020	May 31, 2026			
Roadtrip Nation: Making It Balance	June 5, 2020	June 5, 2026			
America's Socialist Experiment	June 8, 2020	June 7, 2021		^{APT WORLDWIDE}	
We're in This Together: Life With the Pandemic	June 30, 2020	October 31, 2020		^{NHK}	
Inside the Savoy	July 1, 2020	June 30, 2022			
Storm Over the Atlantic	July 1, 2020	June 30, 2022			
Solidarnosc: How Solidarity Changed Europe	July 1, 2020	June 30, 2022			
Thank You for the Challenge: The 10th Quadrennial International Violin Competition of Indianapolis	July 1, 2020	July 31, 2023			
Hearts of Glass	July 14, 2020	July 13, 2023			
Samurai Wall	August 1, 2020	December 31, 2020		^{NHK}	
Barakan Discovers Tokyo	August 1, 2020	December 31, 2020		^{NHK}	
Helping Hands: The Lives of Atomic Bomb Orphans	August 1, 2020	December 31, 2020		^{NHK}	
Sea of Light: A Blind Yachtsman's Voyage Across the Pacific	August 1, 2020	December 31, 2020		^{NHK}	
Second Wind: The Tale of a Sailor	August 1, 2020	July 31, 2023			
Love Me as I Am	August 1, 2020	July 31, 2022			
The Hook	August 12, 2020	August 11, 2026		^{CREATE}	
The Revolutionist: Eugene V. Debs	August 14, 2020	August 13, 2024			
In Frame: The Man Behind the Museum Hotels	September 1, 2020	August 31, 2024			
My Survivor	September 2, 2020	September 1, 2026			
The Last Artifact	September 7, 2020	September 6, 2026		^{APT WORLDWIDE}	
Re-Evolution: The Embargo	September 7, 2020	September 6, 2023			
Orchestrating Change	September 8, 2020	September 7, 2025		^{APT WORLDWIDE}	
Extraordinary: The Bill Atkinson Story	October 1, 2020	September 30, 2022			
Roadtrip Nation: At Your Fingertips	October 2, 2020	October 1, 2026			
Re-Evolution: Salud	October 3, 2020	October 2, 2023			
Re-Evolution: Suenos	October 12, 2020	October 11, 2023			
The Book Makers	October 12, 2020	October 11, 2022			
Hawaiiana	October 15, 2020	October 14, 2023			
Florida Keys: Protecting Paradise	November 1, 2020	October 31, 2022			
World's Greatest Ships - The Mayflower	November 1, 2020	October 31, 2023			
Seeing Is Believing: Women Direct	December 1, 2020	November 30, 2022			
The Real Prince Philip: A Royal Officer	December 1, 2020	November 30, 2022			
Fat Boy: The Billy Stewart Story	February 3, 2021	February 2, 2026			
3/11: The Tsunami	March 1, 2021	June 30, 2021		^{NHK}	
In The Name of Peace: John Hume in America	March 1, 2021	February 28, 2023			
Optimizing Life	March 1, 2021	February 28, 2024			
Fauci: The Virus Hunter	March 8, 2021	March 7, 2022			
The Fallen Astronaut	April 1, 2021	March 31, 2023			
Warwick Davis and the Seven Dwarfs of Auschwitz	April 1, 2021	March 31, 2023			
I Danced for the Angel of Death - The Dr. Edith Eva Eger Story	April 8, 2021	April 7, 2025			
Roadtrip Nation: Do It Differently	May 10, 2021	May 9, 2025			
Chasing Greatness	May 30, 2021	May 29, 2023			
Searching for the Standing Boy of Nagasaki	June 1, 2021	December 31, 2021	(Note: Originally titled Searching for the Boy Standing by the Crematory.)	^{NHK}	
Roadtrip Nation: Caring Forward	June 1, 2021	May 31, 2026			
Surviving Disasters with Les Stroud	June 6, 2021	June 5, 2024			
Fatal Shot	July 1, 2021	June 30, 2023			
The Queen in Her Own Words	July 1, 2021	June 30, 2023			
Miracle Body: Breaking Limits	July 1, 2021	October 31, 2021		^{NHK}	
9/11 Kids	August 1, 2021	September 30, 2023			
The Lesson	August 1, 2021	July 31, 2023			
Dreadnought Destruction: Sinking the German Battle Fleet	August 1, 2021	July 31, 2023			
Pioneers in Skirts	August 8, 2021	August 7, 2023			
A Dream in Doubt	September 1, 2021	August 31, 2025			
Mosque Attack: A Survivor's Story	September 1, 2021	August 31, 2023			
Art Is Trash Without Social Impact	September 1, 2021	March 31, 2022		^{NHK}	
A Place to Breathe	October 1, 2021	September 30, 2024			
Big Dreams in Umatilla	October 3, 2021	October 2, 2024			
Hearing the Voice of Nakamura Tetsu	November 1, 2021	March 31, 2022		^{NHK}	
When Patsy Cline Was Crazy	November 1, 2021	October 31, 2023			
Tuning the Brain with Music	December 1, 2021	November 30, 2023			
The Fabulous History of Skiing	December 1, 2021	November 30, 2023			
Born to Riverdance	December 1, 2021	November 30, 2023			
Fukushima Monologue	January 1, 2022	March 31, 2022		^{NHK}	
The Stand: How One Gesture Shook the World	January 1, 2022	December 31, 2023			
Beyond the Baton: A Conductor's Journey	February 1, 2022	January 31, 2025			
Irish Dance: Steps of Freedom	February 1, 2022	January 31, 2024			
Irma: My Life in Music	February 2, 2022	February 1, 2026			
Titanic: Band of Courage	March 1, 2022	February 29, 2024			
Princess Diana: Who Do You Think She Was?	March 1, 2022	February 29, 2024			
Rip Current Rescue	April 1, 2022	March 31, 2024			
The Man Who Destroyed Oscar Wilde	April 1, 2022	March 31, 2024			
When Comedy Went to School	April 1, 2022	March 31, 2024			
They Survived Together	April 1, 2022	March 31, 2024			
The Queen and Her Prime Ministers	April 1, 2022	March 31, 2024			
The Shot Felt 'Round the World: How the Polio Vaccine Saved the World	April 1, 2022	March 31, 2025			
Secrets of Sacred Architecture	April 2, 2022	April 1, 2026		^{APT WORLDWIDE}	
The Real Bedford Falls: It's a Wonderful Life	April 3, 2022	December 31, 2024			
Myanmar Coup: Digital Resistance	May 1, 2022	August 31, 2022		^{NHK}	
Myanmar in Turmoil: The Inside Story on the Military Crackdown	May 1, 2022	August 31, 2022		^{NHK}	
Roadtrip Nation: Skill Shift	May 2, 2022	May 1, 2026			
The Misty Experiment: The Secret Battle for the Ho Chi Minh Trail	May 2, 2022	May 1, 2026	(Note: Originally titled The Misty Experiment.)	^{APT WORLDWIDE}	
Mending Walls: The Documentary	May 5, 2022	May 4, 2025			
Roadtrip Nation: Native Way Forward	July 1, 2022	June 30, 2026			
Elmore Leonard: "But don't try to write"	July 1, 2022	June 30, 2025		^{APT WORLDWIDE}	
20 Years of Glory: Yokozuna HAKUHO	July 1, 2022	December 31, 2022		^{NHK}	
Shohei Ohtani: A Baseball Virtuoso	September 1, 2022	June 30, 2023		^{NHK}	
Finding Tyler	October 1, 2022	September 30, 2024			
Groundworks	October 1, 2022	September 30, 2026		^{VMM}	
Myanmar Conflict: No End in Sight	October 1, 2022	June 30, 2023		^{NHK}	
Inside High Noon	November 1, 2022	October 31, 2025		^{APT WORLDWIDE}	
The Queen Mother Blitz	November 1, 2022	October 31, 2024			
Digging Deep: What Makes Shiba Inu Dogs So Special?	November 1, 2022	March 31, 2023		^{NHK}	
Dear Mr. Collins: 80 Years Since the Japanese-American Internment	November 1, 2022	March 31, 2023		^{NHK}	
Fukushima Monologue II	December 1, 2022	March 31, 2023		^{NHK}	
A Monk Who Wears Heels	January 1, 2023	June 30, 2023		^{NHK}	
Conveying the Horrors of War: Ukraine's Frontline Journalists	February 1, 2023	May 31, 2023		^{NHK}	
Tracking China's Mystery Ships: The Race for Seabed Supremacy	February 1, 2023	May 31, 2023		^{NHK}	
Ruth Stone's Vest Library of the Female Mind	March 1, 2023	February 28, 2026			
Prelude: The Legacy of Garth Fagan Dance	March 1, 2023	February 28, 2026			
Chiliheads	April 1, 2023	March 31, 2025			
The Twinning Reaction	April 1, 2023	March 31, 2025			
Jews of the Wild West	April 1, 2023	March 31, 2025			
Crossing Overtown	April 10, 2023	April 9, 2026			
Breath of Freedom	May 1, 2023	April 30, 2025			
Barakan Discovers: Ainu - A New Generation	May 1, 2023	October 31, 2023		^{NHK}	
Meet and Eat at Lee's Garden	May 2, 2023	May 1, 2025			
When Wire Was King: The Transformation of Communications	July 1, 2023	June 30, 2025			
Curse of the Spencers	July 1, 2023	June 30, 2025			
The Amish Dilemma	August 1, 2023	July 31, 2025			
Her Name Was Grace Kelly	August 1, 2023	July 31, 2025			
Flavors of the Dominican Republic	September 1, 2023	August 31, 2025			
Birthright	October 1, 2023	September 30, 2025			
Steve Jobs and Japan	October 1, 2023	March 31, 2024		^{NHK}	
Reciprocity Project	November 1, 2023	October 31, 2025			
Paris: The Mystery of the Lost Palace	November 1, 2023	October 31, 2025			
Jodie Foster, Hollywood Under the Skin	November 1, 2023	October 31, 2025			
Hitchcock Confidential	November 1, 2023	October 31, 2025			
Legends of the Canyon	December 1, 2023	November 30, 2025			
The Savoy at Christmas	December 1, 2023	November 30, 2025			
The Kim Yo-Jong: Red Princess	January 1, 2024	December 31, 2025			
Inspired Lives	February 1, 2024	January 31, 2026			
Television Event	April 1, 2024	March 31, 2026			
El Mole	April 1, 2024	March 31, 2026			
Eva's Promise	April 15, 2024	April 14, 2026			
Return to Belsen	April 15, 2024	April 14, 2025			
Edward VIII: Britain's Traitor King	May 1, 2024	April 30, 2026			
Big Ben Restored: The Grand Unveiling	May 1, 2024	April 30, 2026			
Art + Medicine: Disability, Culture and Creativity	May 1, 2024	April 30, 2026			
Art and Pep	June 1, 2024	May 31, 2026			
Olympic Pride, American Prejudice	July 1, 2024	June 30, 2026		^{APT WORLDWIDE}	
Mel Brooks: The Genius Entertainer	July 1, 2024	June 30, 2026			
Fighting for Lincoln: The Wide Awakes	July 1, 2024	June 30, 2026			
Hitler's Olympics	July 1, 2024	June 30, 2026			
The King Who Fooled Hitler	August 1, 2024	July 31, 2026			
The Man Who Stole Einstein's Brain	August 1, 2024	July 31, 2026			
Barakan Discovers Amami Oshima: Isson's Treasure Island	September 1, 2024	August 31, 2025		^{NHK}	
Underdogs	October 1, 2024	September 30, 2026			
Chopin Saved My Life	October 1, 2024	June 9, 2026			
Profe	October 1, 2024	September 30, 2026			
Women of the Watershed	October 1, 2024	September 30, 2026	(Note: Originally titled Everglades, Women of the Watershed.)		
North Korea: A Filmmaker Walks the Tightrope	October 1, 2024	October 31, 2025		^{NHK}	
Dreams of Glory: The World of Women's Sumo	October 1, 2024	October 31, 2025		^{NHK}	
Ready for London 2025	December 1, 2024	November 30, 2025			
Kimono Truth	August 1, 2025	March 31, 2026		^{NHK}	
Kyoto's Gion Matsuri: Core Kyoto Special	August 1, 2025	March 31, 2026		^{NHK}	
Who Will Protect the "Last Traditional Village"?: Yunnan, China	August 1, 2025	March 31, 2026		^{NHK}	
History Uncovered - Kimono Dress: Japan's Clothing Revolution	August 1, 2025	March 31, 2026		^{NHK}	

== See also ==
- List of programs formerly distributed by American Public Television
- List of PBS member stations
- List of programs broadcast by PBS
- List of programs broadcast by PBS Kids
- List of programs broadcast by Create
- List of worldwide programs distributed by American Public Television
