= Roadmap =

A roadmap may refer to:

- A road map, a form of map that details roads and transport links
- A plan, e.g.
  - Road map for peace, to resolve the Israeli-Palestinian conflict
  - Technology roadmap, a management forecasting tool
- Roadmap (book), a 2015 nonfiction book by Roadtrip Nation
