= Jonas Friddle =

American musician

- Born: North Carolina
- Origin: Chicago, Illinois
- Genres: Americana, Folk rock, Old Time, Folk, Progressive bluegrass, Country music, Orchestral Folk
- Instruments: guitar, banjo, fiddle
- Years active: – present
- Label: Independent
- Website: www.jonasfriddle.com

Jonas Friddle and The Majority
- Origin: Chicago, Illinois
- Genres: Americana, Folk rock, Old Time, Folk, Progressive bluegrass, Orchestral Folk
- Years active: 2012 to present
- Label: Independent
- Members: Jonas Friddle; Anna Jacobson; Evan Jacobson; Andrew Green; Bailey Doyle; Andrew Wilkins; Geoff Dolce
- Past members: Jarod Facknitz; Arielle Luckmann; Maria McCullough
- Website: www.jonasfriddle.com

Jonas Friddle is a Chicago-based singer, songwriter, arranger, and banjo player; he also plays guitar, fiddle, mandolin, and several other instruments. His compositions have won awards, including "Belle De Louisville," which won the John Lennon Songwriting Contest award for Song of the Year for 2012. Friddle says he composed the song on the banjo which helps give it its rolling feel, appropriate for a song about a steamboat. Then in 2014, his song "Man Was Made To Fly" from the 2013 album, Use Your Voice, won the "Folk" category in the Great American Song Contest. That album was also nominated as Album of the Year for the Independent Music Awards. His original songs have been described as "a mixture of rock and old-time, New Orleans trad and bluegrass, country and blues."

His music is included in three episodes of Roadtrip Nation. The songs used are: "Tired Chicken Blues," "Black-Eyed Suzie," "Shake It Down," and "Rabbit."

Friddle's interest in songwriting and music has been lifelong. Originally from Black Mountain, North Carolina, he is a graduate of Berea College with degrees in English and theater. While there he played bass in the college bluegrass ensemble. After graduating he received a Thomas J. Watson Fellowship to travel to several countries to study community-building through music.

He moved to Chicago in 2007, and in 2008 became an instructor at the Old Town School of Folk Music. There he teaches guitar, fiddle, and banjo and specializes in Old Time music, Americana, jug band blues, modern folk, and songwriting. Shortly after moving to Chicago he formed a banjo and fiddle duo, "Sleepy Lou," with Maria McCullogh. They specialized in traditional music from the United States and Mexico.

He also formed "The Barehand Jugband," focused on jug band blues. The Barehand Jugband gained a following around Chicago and was the winner of the Minneapolis Battle of the Jug Bands in February 2010 (Pancake League, the first year that contest took place) and in February 2011 (Waffle League).

In late 2011 to early 2012, Friddle changed his performing and recording focus to his original compositions. He recruited musicians from other projects he was involved in, primarily colleagues at the Old Town School of Folk Music, to play on two albums of his original songs, Synco Pony and Belle De Louisville which were released at the same time in 2012.

In 2012, Friddle and the musicians from Belle De Louisville began to perform as Jonas Friddle and the Majority. Their instrumentation includes a string section, horns, organ, banjo and drums. Jonas Friddle notes that their combination of instruments is unusual: "old-time banjo is seldom found in the company of a French horn or full string section," and others have observed that they take a "non-traditional approach to the traditional string band layout and repertoire." Their sound has been described as "at once huge and intimate, in the way only old-timey, bluegrassy folk music can be."

Friddle recorded two more albums with "The Majority": Use Your Voice in 2013 and Jonas Friddle & The Majority in 2016. He continues to perform his original compositions with that band, but also performs jug band music, blues, swing and old-time as a trio with Majority members Anna and Evan Jacobson, as well as performing traditional old-time music solo or with others. He also performs his original songs solo or with a four-piece band.

In 2019, Friddle released The Last Place to Go, an album entirely of his original songs, recorded with a smaller group of musicians. Friddle felt that a smaller band than he had used for the previous recordings fit the songs better. The album was described as a "dazzlingly rich lode of tonal and especially textual delights," and as having a "widely textured sound that remains intimate with the words in focus." The recording, also described as having a more intimate sound focused on storytelling, was recorded live directly to analog tape. Instrumentation includes guitar, fiddle, trumpet, dobro, electric guitar, upright and electric bass, piano, and drums. However, there is no banjo, a lack the liner notes apologize for. Some of the songs have been described as having a stripped-down modern folk/country feel, and Friddle himself says that the album is more "country" than some of his earlier work.

== Discography ==
=== Barehand Jugband ===
- Always A Bridesmaid (2009)
- Wipe 'Em Off (2010)
- EP - 2011 (2011)

=== Sleepy Lou ===
- Sleepy Lou (2010)

=== Jonas Friddle ===
- Drilling For Oil (2010)
- SyncoPony (2012)
- Belle De Louisville (2012)
- The Last Place To Go (2019)
- "Under The Weather" (single) (2020)
- Jug Band Happy Hour (2023)
- When the Water was the Sky (2024)
- "June Bug" (single) (2025)

=== Jonas Friddle & The Majority ===
- Use Your Voice (2013)
- "First Corn of the Season" (single) (2014)
- Jonas Friddle & The Majority (2016)
