= Joe O'Donnell (photojournalist) =

American journalist

- Born: May 7, 1922; Johnstown, Pennsylvania
- Died: August 9, 2007 (aged 85); Nashville, Tennessee
- Occupation: Photojournalist

Joseph Roger O'Donnell (May 7, 1922 – August 9, 2007) was an American documentarian, photojournalist and a photographer for the United States Information Agency.

== Early life and education ==
Joseph Roger O’Donnell was born on May 7, 1922, in Johnstown, Pennsylvania. After graduating from high school, he enlisted in the Marines, who sent him to photography school.

== Photojournalism ==
At 23, as a Marine sergeant, O'Donnell documented the aftermath of bombing in Japan for seven months, starting with Nagasaki, devastated by an atomic bomb on August 9, 1945. On August 28, 1945, his unit became among the first to enter Japan. The photos included the iconic "The boy standing by the crematory" as well as a photo of a classroom of burned children, and one of faces torn away. The Army never approved O'Donnell's trips to Nagasaki, and it was unclear whether they would destroy photographs of dead bodies or wounded survivors. To be safe, O'Donnell concealed his trips from his unit and secretly carried the undeveloped negatives back to the United States.

Following the war, O’Donnell moved to Washington and briefly operated his own photography studio, before returning to public work. As a presidential photographer, O'Donnell captured iconic moments such as the handshake between Harry S. Truman and Gen. Douglas MacArthur on Wake Island during the Korean War and President John F. Kennedy deliberating the Bay of Pigs invasion. Because he was on the government payroll, O'Donnell did not receive personal credit for those photographs, although he autographed and sold copies of them after his retirement from government service in 1968.

For fifty years, O'Donnell's secret Nagasaki photos were locked in a trunk in his home. By his own recollection, he was attempting to forget about what he witnessed. In 1989, O'Donnell stayed with the Sisters of Loretto in Nerinx, Kentucky due to recurring mental health struggles. There, he saw a sculpture of an atomic bomb survivor made by one of the sisters, which caused him to remember his trunk and reopen it. He was so disturbed that he became an advocate against nuclear arms, publishing books and lecturing in Japan and the United States. Distributing the photos caused O'Donnell's depression to worsen, and he purposefully suppressed some of the most gruesome photos from publication.

In 1995, controversy surrounded O'Donnell's work as the National Air and Space Museum prepared to exhibit the Enola Gay, the B-29 that bombed Hiroshima. His images intended to depict the devastating effects of the bombs faced objections from veterans who argued that the photos and accompanying text presented an unbalanced view, overlooking Japan's aggression and the bombs' role in ending the war and saving American lives. Consequently, the photographs were removed from curatorial plans, along with other features deemed offensive to veterans. In an interview with National Public Radio that year, O'Donnell asserted that, based on his post-war observations, Japan could have been defeated with conventional arms, avoiding the anticipated high casualties from an invasion of Japan.

== Controversy ==
A controversy followed the printing of his obituary in the press. Some of the photographs that had been attributed to O'Donnell were actually shot by other photographers. A photograph of a saluting John F. Kennedy Jr. during the funeral for his father in 1963 was taken by Stan Stearns for United Press International, not by O'Donnell. O'Donnell also claimed credit for a photograph showing Stalin, Roosevelt and Churchill during a wartime meeting in Tehran, Iran, in 1943, but O'Donnell is not known to have been in Tehran at the time.

Tyge O'Donnell, the son of O'Donnell, attributes his father's instances of wrongly claiming credit for others' work, such as Stearn's photo, to his dementia, suggesting that he mistakenly asserted authorship of several photographs due to difficulties in remembering which ones were genuinely his own.

== Personal life ==
O'Donnell married Kimiko Sakai (b. 1960) in 1997. He had three sons and a daughter.

== Death ==
O'Donnell died in Nashville, Tennessee on August 9, 2007, due to complications arising from a stroke, according to his wife. She mentioned that he underwent over 50 operations, including procedures on his colon and heart, and attributed his declining health to radiation exposure from his visits to Nagasaki and Hiroshima.
