= Mimi Weddell =

American actress (1915–2009)

- Born: Marion Rogers; February 15, 1915; Williston, North Dakota
- Died: September 24, 2009 (aged 94); Manhattan, New York
- Occupation: Actress
- Years active: 1978–2007
- Television: Sex and the City

Marion Rogers "Mimi' Weddell (February 15, 1915 – September 24, 2009) was an American actress. She is best known for portraying Stanford's grandmother on Sex and the City and for being featured in a documentary film, Hats Off, about her life and her collection of some 150 hats.

== Early life ==
She was born as Marion Rogers in Williston, North Dakota on February 15, 1915, and grew up in Massachusetts. Following the divorce that ended her first marriage, she moved to New York City. There she was hired by The New York Times, working as an assistant to the paper's fashion editor. Her second marriage was to Richard Weddell in 1946, who had been working at the time as an executive with the classical recordings division of RCA Victor and later became an art dealer.

== Acting career ==
According to the film Hats Off, Weddell only began her acting career in earnest once she was 65, following the death of her husband in 1981, which had left her with a stack of unpaid bills.

She first appeared in the 1980 low-budget horror film Dracula's Last Rites in the role of Mrs. Bradley and followed that in the subsequent year as Miss Mumsley in 1981's Student Bodies, a parody of the horror genre. In 1985, she appeared in Woody Allen's The Purple Rose of Cairo, where she stood in line with Mia Farrow to purchase a ticket to the film within the film. She appeared in two episodes of the police procedural / legal drama Law & Order, in the 1990 episode Subterranean Homeboy Blues and in 1997's Past Imperfect. Weddell played the role of a snoring woman in the wedding scene in the 1986 movie Heartburn by Nora Ephron, and in the 2005 film Hitch, starring Will Smith and Eva Mendes, Weddell played the role of Grandma Wellington, who pretended to choke on an olive at dinner. She was in a single episode of Sex and the City, appearing in the 1998 episode The Turtle and the Hare as Stanford Blatch's grandmother. She also appeared in print and television advertisements for Burberry, Juicy Couture, Louis Vuitton and Nike.

She was voted one of "The Most Beautiful New Yorkers" by New York Magazine in 2005, with casting director Jennifer Venditti calling her "a whole package", noting that Weddell "has such elegant style and willowy posture, but she doesn't try to conceal her wrinkles and signs of aging".

Weddell had been featured in ads for numerous top fashion brands, including Louis Vuitton. She is also known for her extensive and expensive hat collection.

== Hats Off ==
The 2008 documentary film Hats Off tells Weddell's life story, following her around as she visits beauty salons, strolls around the city and her litany of auditions, exercise sessions and dance lessons. The film was produced by Michael Arlen Davis together with Directors Guild of America Award-nominated director Jyll Johnstone, a friend of Weddell's daughter, who followed Weddell for most of a decade and interviewed other actors, casting directors and family members to shine a light on her life. The film was screened at the Telluride Film Festival and the Palm Springs International Film Festival, as well as on Sveriges Television in Sweden.

Reviewer Jeanette Catsoulis of The New York Times said the film showed Weddell as a unique "individual", an actress in her 90s who still demonstrated a "willingness to work 14-hour days and fight for roles", building a substantial resume despite the "industry's rampant ageism".

== Death ==
Mimi Weddell died at age 94 in her Manhattan home after a short illness on September 24, 2009.

== Filmography ==
Film
Year	Title	Role	Notes
1980	Last Rites	Mrs. Bradley	
1981	Student Bodies	Miss Mumsley	
1985	The Purple Rose of Cairo	Ticket Buyer	
1987	Anna	Agent's Secretary	
1994	Go Fish	Mimi	
1999	The Thomas Crown Affair	National Art Club Guest	
2003	Marci X	Woman at Auction	
2004	Messengers	Ruth White	
2005	Hitch	Grandma Wellington	
2005	A Perfect Fit	Mrs. Kinsley	(final film role)
2007	Across the Universe		
Television
Year	Title	Role	Notes
1990-1997	Law & Order	Mrs. Sandinsky / Baglady	2 episodes
1998	Sex and the City	Stanford's Grandmother	1 episode
