= The Boy Standing by the Crematory =

1945 photograph taken by Joe O'Donnell

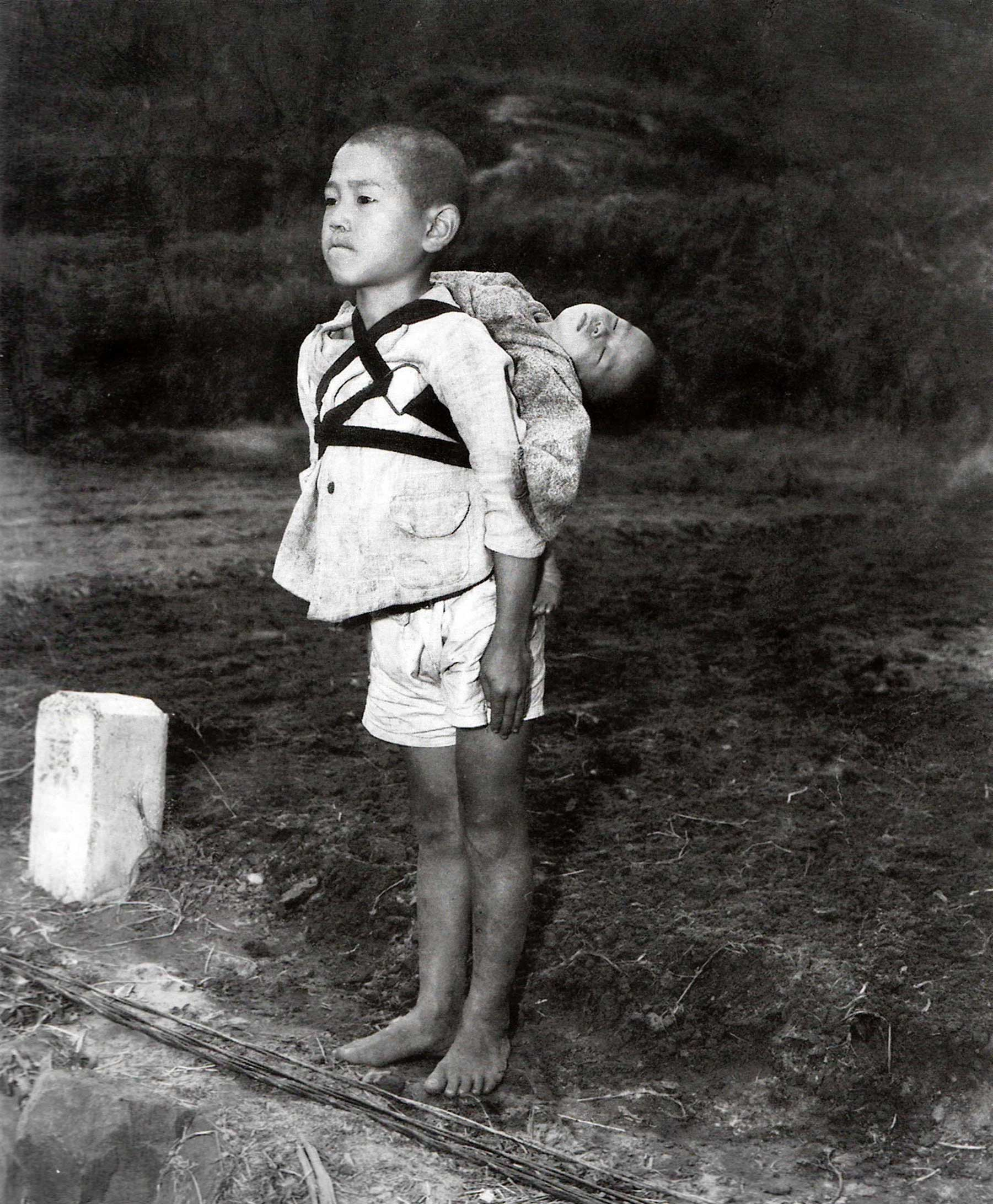
The boy standing by the crematory (1945). This is the original version of the photo, which was flipped horizontally in O'Donnell's reproduction.

The Boy Standing by the Crematory (alternatively The Standing Boy of Nagasaki) is a historic photograph taken in Nagasaki, Japan, in October of 1945, shortly after the atomic bombing of that city on August 9, 1945. The photograph is of a barefoot boy of about 10 years old with his dead baby brother strapped to his back, waiting for his turn at the crematorium.

The photograph was taken by Joe O'Donnell, then working for the United States Marine Corps.

I saw a boy about ten years old walking by. He was carrying a baby on his back. In those days in Japan, we often saw children playing with their little brothers or sisters on their backs, but this boy was clearly different. I could see that he had come to this place for a serious reason. He was wearing no shoes. His face was hard. The little head was tipped back as if the baby were fast asleep. The boy stood there for five or ten minutes.

The men in white masks walked over to him and quietly began to take off the rope that was holding the baby. That is when I saw that the baby was already dead. The men held the body by the hands and feet and placed it on the fire. The boy stood there straight without moving, watching the flames. He was biting his lower lip so hard that it shone with blood. The flame burned low like the sun going down. The boy turned around and walked silently away.

— Joe O'Donnell

O'Donnell made personal copies of his Nagasaki photographs and kept them hidden in a trunk until 1989, when he put together a traveling exhibit and a book. O'Donnell's Japan 1945, Images From the Trunk was published in Japan in 1995 and read widely.

== Efforts to determine the boy's identity ==
In 1979, Yoshitoshi Fukahori, who had been near the bombing and was still haunted by trauma from the events, began a lifelong effort of collecting photographs of the immediate aftermath. When he saw the photograph of the boy, Fukahori began an effort to determine the boy's identity. He ultimately failed, but the photograph was also seen by Masanori Muraoka.

Muraoka believed that he recognized the boy as a childhood playmate, although he had forgotten or never knew the boy's name. He also believed that he had met the boy after the bombing, carrying his dead brother on his back, and explaining "My mother isn't here." Muraoka undertook his own investigation to determine the boy's identity. Muraoka found a few minor possible clues, but he also failed, although he kept an extensive notebook of his efforts.

A 50-minute documentary film, Searching for the Standing Boy of Nagasaki ('焼き場に立つ少年'をさがして), was produced by NHK and released on August 8, 2020. Medical experts quoted in the documentary suggested that the boy showed signs of bleeding from his nose and eyes, suggesting he was suffering from radiation sickness, possibly from exposure induced by searching for his family near the blast zone. The film contextualized the photo with the experiences of "surviving atomic bomb orphans". In 2021, the film was distributed in America by American Public Television.
