= Urban Rez =

2013 documentary film

- Genre: Documentary
- Written by: Lisa D. Olken
- Directed by: Larry T. Pourier
- Country of origin: United States
- Original language: English

Production
- Producer: Lisa D. Olken
- Running time: 57 minutes
- Production company: Vision Maker Media

Original release
- Network: PBS
- Release: October 27, 2013

Urban Rez is a 2013 American documentary film about the repercussions of the Urban Relocation Program (1952–1973), the greatest voluntary upheaval of Native Americans during the 20th century. It was directed by Larry T. Pourier and written by Lisa D. Olken.

The film examines policies that encouraged Native Americans to relocate. The documentary focuses on Native Americans in rural areas. The film uses personal stories and modern-day analysis to reflect on the Voluntary Relocation Program.

The documentary was released on PBS.

== Reception ==
The film won the 2013 Heartland Emmy Award for Best Cultural Documentary, was an Official Selection to the 2013 Native American Indian & Video Festival of the Southeast, and was the Best Documentary Short Winner at the 2013 American Indian Festival.

In addition, the film screened at the 2014 First Nations Film and Video Festival.

== See also ==
Indian Relocation Act of 1956
