= Hats Off (2008 film) =

- Directed by: Jyll Johnstone
- Produced by: Canobie Films
- Starring: Mimi Weddell
- Release date: March 28, 2008
- Running time: 84 minutes
- Country: United States
- Language: English

Hats Off is a 2008 documentary film directed by Jyll Johnstone. It screened at the Telluride Film Festival and the Palm Springs International Film Festival, as well as on Sveriges Television in Sweden.

Hats Off tells the story of actress and model Mimi Weddell who, at the age of 93, still enjoys a successful career in New York City. The film centers on Mimi's day-to-day life, focusing on her exuberant personality and relationship with her children. It follows Mimi from her apartment to dance lessons, auditions, Elizabeth Arden appointments, and fashionable strolls around New York City.

The film was shot over a period of ten years by Directors Guild of America Award-nominated director Jyll Johnstone, a childhood friend of Mimi's daughter Sarah Dillon. It features interviews with family members, casting agents, and fellow actors, all of whom shed light on what they see as Mimi's apparently unending energy and devotion to her craft. From her debut role in cult classic film Dracula's Last Rites to a recent print ad for Juicy Couture, Mimi's work is described in anecdote and often presented onscreen.

The film is the second in a series of three films by Johnstone that "explores the lives of three 85-plus women still actively engaged in creative lives."
