= Roadmap (book) =

2015 book by Roadtrip Nation

- First edition
- Author: Roadtrip Nation
- Language: English
- Genre: Non-fiction
- Publication date: 2015

Roadmap: The Get-It-Together Guide for Figuring Out What to Do With Your Life is a 2015 book written by Roadtrip Nation, an independent organization that provides career and life resources such as documentary TV series, books, online multimedia resources, and educational resources. The book was written by Roadtrip Nation's trio of founders (Nathan Gebhard, Brian McAllister, and Mike Marriner) as well as by other members of the series and organization. It made The New York Times Best Seller list under the "Education" section in May 2015.

== Overview ==
Roadmap is a non-fiction book that covers career forging. Full-color charts and graph illustrations are drawn by artist Jay Sacher. The book is centered around over 130 interviews, including those from figures such as Ahmir "Questlove" Thompson, Jad Abumrad, and Soledad O'Brien, all of whom offer advice to a younger generation. The book is divided into three sections: Let Go, Define, and Become.

== Reception ==
The book received mostly favorable reviews and made The New York Times Best Seller list under the "Education" section in May 2015.
