= Roadtrip Nation =

American educational production company

- Genre: Travel
- Country of origin: United States
- Original language: English
- No. of seasons: 27

Original release
- Release: 2004 – present

Roadtrip Nation is an educational production company based out of Costa Mesa, California that produces the eponymous public television documentary series Roadtrip Nation.

== Movement ==
The hub for the Roadtrip Nation movement is an informational and community-building website where students who have hit the road can create their own web pages within the Roadtrip Nation community; there, they can upload their daily blogs, interview transcriptions, travel photos and trip coordinates.

== RoadtripNation.org ==
In the spring of 2008 Roadtrip Nation started a non-profit educational organization, RoadtripNation.org, to bring resources, insights, and inspiration from the road to middle school, high school and college students across the country. RoadtripNation.org develops curriculum and resources for students.

Their curriculum, The Roadtrip Nation Experience, is a 12-lesson plan based on both the theoretical and practical components of learning.

With multimedia resources, students are connected to the vast Roadtrip Nation Interview Archive, which has been continually built since 2001 by Roadtrippers and includes interviews from all types of Leaders from all over the world. Roadtrip Scholars are also engaged with an interactive workbook, online exercises and activities.

== Public television ==
In 2004, the first season of Roadtrip Nation aired on PBS. Destination Unknown followed three students from New Jersey driving along the West Coast. Among the interviews featured are Aspen Skiing Company CEO Pat O'Donnell, and Levi Strauss & Co. CEO Phil Marineau. By the end of 2005, more than 200 PBS stations had picked up the series.

== Feature-length documentaries ==
- The Open Road
- Why Not Us?

== Bibliography ==
Roadtrip Nation has also released four companion books, including Roadmap: The Get-it-Together Guide for Figuring Out What to Do With Your Life, which made The New York Times' Best Sellers List in May 2015.

- Destination Unknown: Define Your Own Road in Life (Roadtrip Productions, 2004)
